= History of radiation protection =

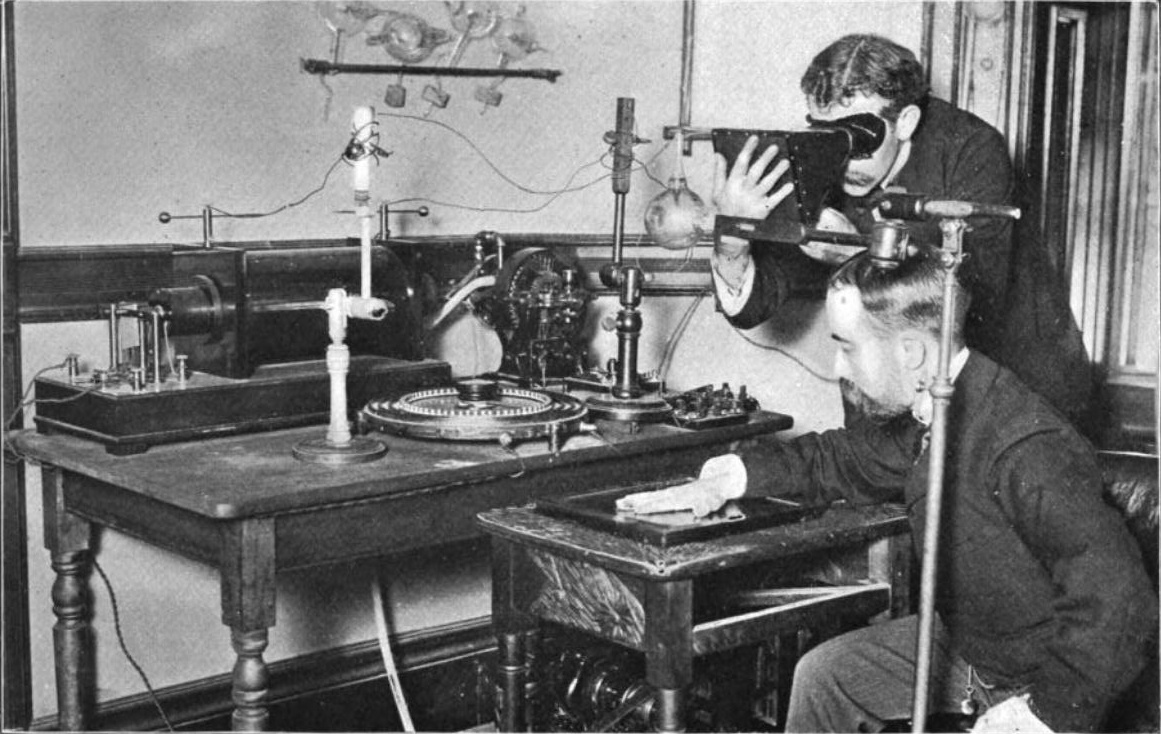
Unprotected experiments in the U.S. in 1896 with an early X-ray tube (Crookes tube), when the dangers of radiation were largely unknown.

The history of radiation protection begins at the turn of the 19th and 20th centuries with the realization that ionizing radiation from natural and artificial sources can have harmful effects on living organisms. As a result, the study of radiation damage also became a part of this history.

While radioactive materials and X-rays were once handled carelessly, increasing awareness of the dangers of radiation in the 20th century led to the implementation of various preventive measures worldwide, resulting in the establishment of radiation protection regulations. Although radiologists were the first victims, they also played a crucial role in advancing radiological progress and their sacrifices will always be remembered. Radiation damage caused many people to suffer amputations or die of cancer. The use of radioactive substances in everyday life was once fashionable, but over time, the health effects became known. Investigations into the causes of these effects have led to increased awareness of protective measures. The dropping of atomic bombs during World War II brought about a drastic change in attitudes towards radiation. The effects of natural cosmic radiation, radioactive substances such as radon and radium found in the environment, and the potential health hazards of non-ionizing radiation are well-recognized. Protective measures have been developed and implemented worldwide, monitoring devices have been created, and radiation protection laws and regulations have been enacted.

In the 21st century, regulations are becoming even stricter. The permissible limits for ionizing radiation intensity are consistently being revised downward. The concept of radiation protection now includes regulations for the handling of non-ionizing radiation.

In the Federal Republic of Germany, radiation protection regulations are developed and issued by the Federal Ministry for the Environment, Nature Conservation, Nuclear Safety and Consumer Protection (BMUV). The Federal Office for Radiation Protection is involved in the technical work. In Switzerland, the Radiation Protection Division of the Federal Office of Public Health is responsible, and in Austria, the Ministry of Climate Action and Energy.

== X-rays ==
=== Early radiation consequences ===
The discovery of X-rays by Wilhelm Conrad Röntgen (1845-1923) in 1895 led to extensive experimentation by scientists, physicians, and inventors. The first X-ray machines produced extremely unfavorable radiation spectra for imaging with extremely high skin doses. In February 1896, John Daniel and William Lofland Dudley (1859–1914) of Vanderbilt University conducted an experiment in which Dudley's head was X-rayed, resulting in hair loss. Herbert D. Hawks, a graduate of Columbia University, suffered severe burns on his hands and chest during demonstration experiments with X-rays. Burns and hair loss were reported in scientific journals. Nikola Tesla (1856–1943) was one of the first researchers to explicitly warn of the potential dangers of X-rays in the Electrical Review on May 5, 1897 - after initially claiming them to be completely harmless. He suffered massive radiation damage after his experiments. Nevertheless, some doctors at the time still claimed that X-rays had no effect on humans. Until the 1940s, X-ray machines were operated without any protective safeguards.

Röntgen himself was spared the fate of the other X-ray users by habit. He always carried the unexposed photographic plates in his pockets and found that they were exposed if he remained in the same room during the exposure. So he regularly left the room when he took X-rays.

Otto Walkhoff: Invisible rays with photographic effect, Photographic Review, Vol. 14, Publisher Knapp, 1900, pp. 189–191

The use of X-rays for diagnostic purposes in dentistry was made possible by the pioneering work of C. Edmund Kells (1856-1928), a New Orleans dentist who demonstrated them to dentists in Asheville, North Carolina, in July 1896. Kells committed suicide after suffering from radiation-induced cancer for many years. He had been amputated one finger at a time, later his entire hand, followed by his forearm and then his entire arm.

Otto Walkhoff (1860-1934), one of the most important German dentists in history, took X-rays of himself in 1896 and is considered a pioneer in dental radiology. He described the required exposure time of 25 minutes as an "ordeal". Braunschweig's medical community later commissioned him to set up and supervise a central X-ray facility. In 1898, the year radium was discovered, he also tested the use of radium in medicine in a self-experiment using an amount of 0.2 grams of radium bromide. Walkhoff observed that cancerous mice exposed to radium radiation died significantly later than a control group of untreated mice. He thus initiated the development of radiation research for the treatment of tumors.

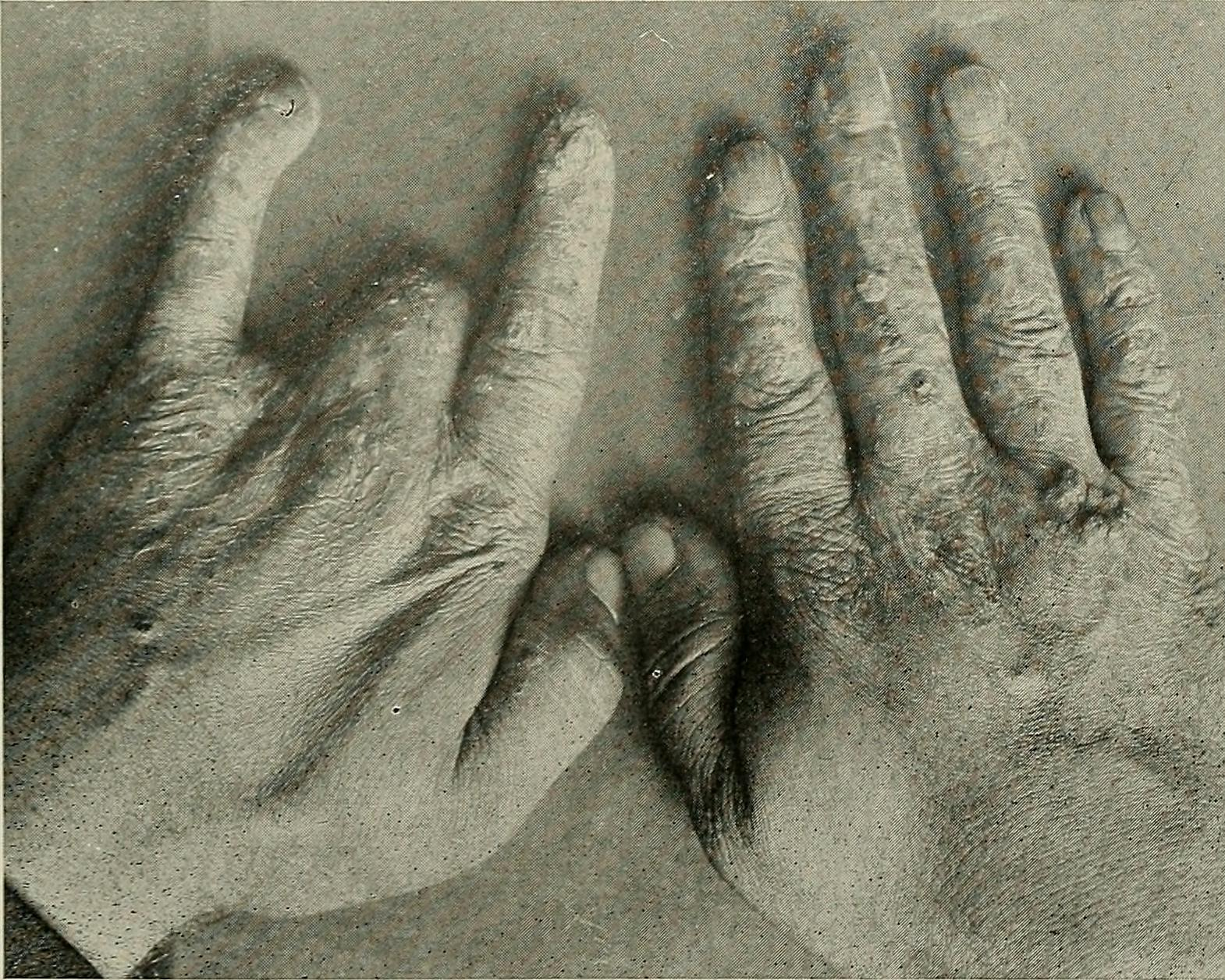
Auto-photographic documentation of the radiation damage to the hands of Kassabian

The Armenian-American radiologist Mihran Krikor Kassabian (1870-1910), vice president of the American Roentgen Ray Society (ARRS), was concerned about the irritating effects of X-rays. In a publication, he mentioned his increasing problems with his hands. Although Kassabian recognized X-rays as the cause, he avoided making this reference so as not to hinder the progress of radiology. In 1902, he suffered a severe radiation burn on his hand. Six years later, the hand became necrotic and two fingers of his left hand were amputated. Kassabian kept a diary and photographed his hands as the tissue damage progressed. He died of cancer in 1910.

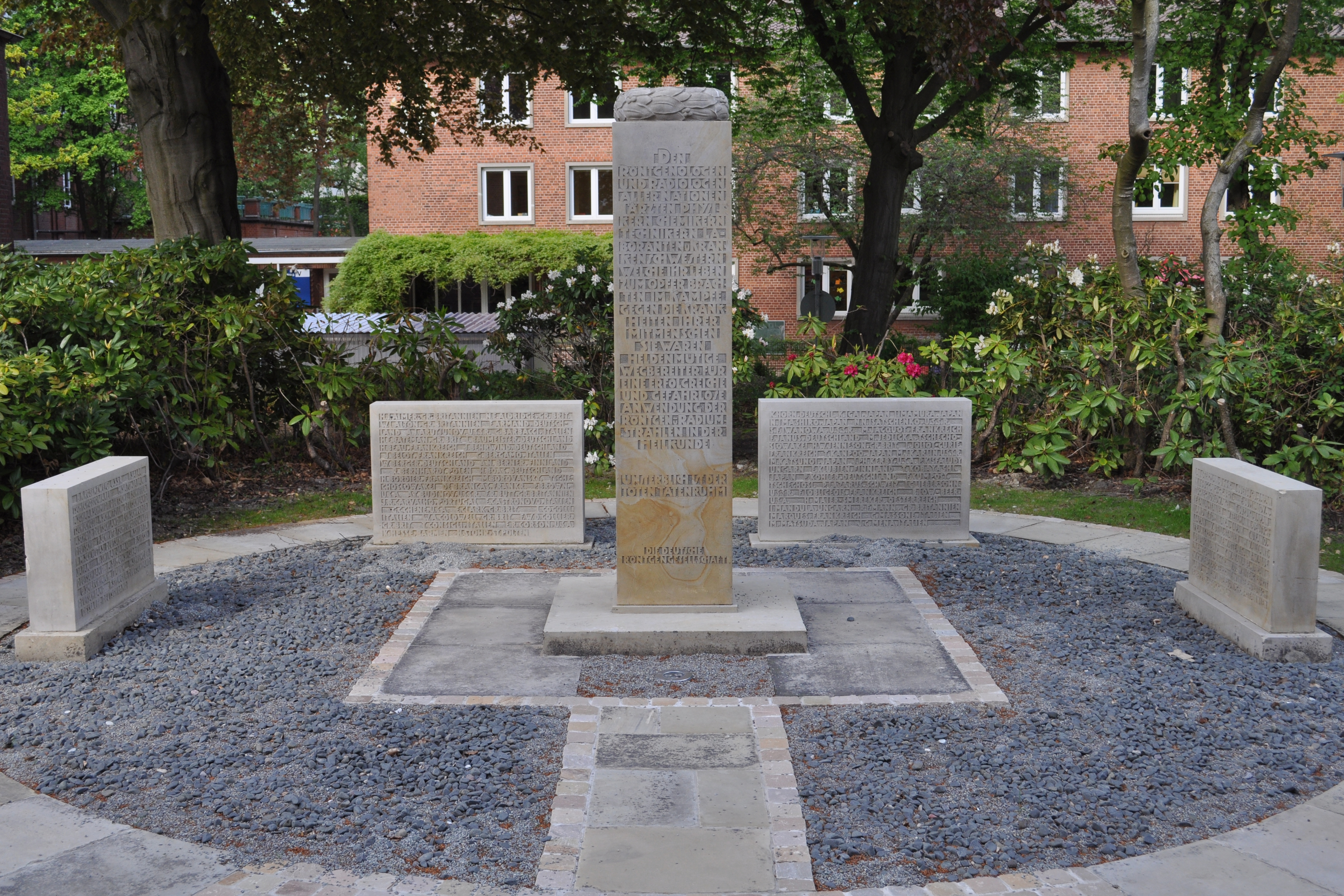
Radiology memorial (Hamburg-St. Georg)

Many of the early X-ray and radioactivity researchers went down in history as "martyrs for science." In her article, The Miracle and the Martyrs, Sarah Zobel of the University of Vermont tells of a 1920 banquet held to honor many of the pioneers of X-rays. Chicken was served for dinner: "Shortly after the meal was served, it could be seen that some of the participants were unable to enjoy the meal. After years of working with X-rays, many of the participants had lost fingers or hands due to radiation exposure and were unable to cut the meat themselves". The first American to die from radiation exposure was Clarence Madison Dally (1845-1904), an assistant to Thomas Alva Edison (1847-1931). Edison began studying X-rays almost immediately after Röntgen's discovery and delegated the task to Dally. Over time, Dally underwent more than 100 skin operations due to radiation damage. Eventually, both of his arms had to be amputated. His death led Edison to abandon all further X-ray research in 1904.

One of the pioneers was the Austrian Gustav Kaiser (1871-1954), who in 1896 succeeded in photographing a double toe with an exposure time of 1½-2 hours. Due to the limited knowledge at the time, he also suffered severe radiation damage to his hands, losing several fingers and his right metacarpal. His work was the basis for, among other things, the construction of lead rubber aprons. Heinrich Albers-Schönberg (1865-1921), the world's first professor of radiology, recommended gonadal protection for testicles and ovaries in 1903. He was one of the first to protect germ cells not only from acute radiation damage but also from small doses of radiation that could accumulate over time and cause late damage. Albers-Schönberg died at the age of 56 from radiation damage, as did Guido Holzknecht and Elizabeth Fleischman.

Since April 4, 1936, a radiology memorial in the garden of Hamburg's St. Georg Hospital has commemorated the 359 victims from 23 countries who were among the first medical users of X-rays.

=== Initial warnings ===
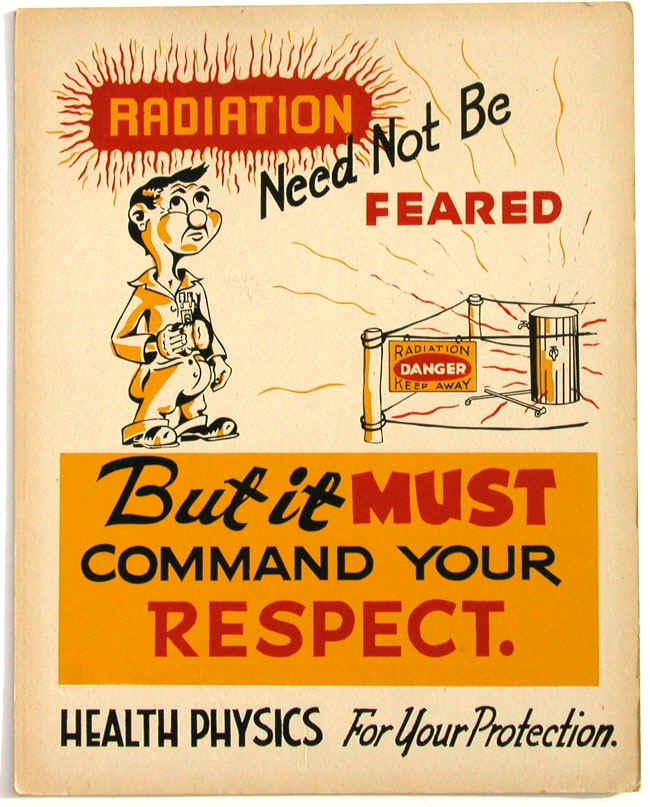
In 1947, posters were put up in the United States to draw attention to radiation protection. At the same time, the four-year-old term health physics was to be popularized.

In 1896, the engineer Wolfram Fuchs, based on his experience with numerous X-ray examinations, recommended keeping the exposure time as short as possible, staying away from the tube, and covering the skin with Vaseline. In 1897, Chicago doctors William Fuchs and Otto Schmidt became the first users to have to pay compensation to a patient for radiation damage.

In 1901, dentist William Herbert Rollins (1852-1929) called for using lead-glass goggles when working with X-rays, for the X-ray tube to be encased in lead, and for all areas of the body to be covered with lead aprons. He published over 200 articles on the potential dangers of X-rays, but his suggestions were long ignored. A year later, Rollins wrote in despair that his warnings about the dangers of X-rays were not being heeded by either the industry or his colleagues. By this time, Rollins had demonstrated that X-rays could kill laboratory animals and induce miscarriages in guinea pigs. Rollins' achievements were not recognized until later. Since then, he has gone down in the history of radiology as the "father of radiation protection". He became a member of the Radiological Society of North America and its first treasurer.

Radiation protection continued to develop with the invention of new measuring devices such as the chromoradiometer by Guido Holzknecht (1872-1931) in 1902, the radiometer by Raymond Sabouraud (1864-1938) and Henri Noiré (1878–1937) in 1904/05, and the quantimeter by Robert Kienböck (1873-1951) in 1905, which made it possible to determine maximum doses at which there was a high probability that no skin changes would occur. Radium was also included by the British Roentgen Society, which published its first memorandum on radium protection in 1921.

=== Unnecessary applications ===
==== Pedoscope ====
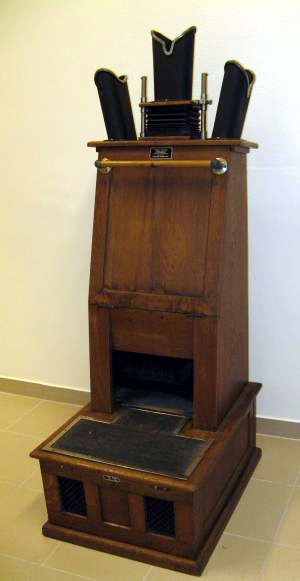
Pedoscope from the 1930s by Ernst Gross X-ray equipment, Berlin, Physikmuseum Salzburg. Later, an additional viewing slit for small children was added at a suitable height so that the child could also see the fluoroscopy.

Since the 1920s, pedoscopes have been installed in many shoe stores in North America and Europe, more than 10,000 in the U.S. alone, following the invention of Jacob Lowe, a Boston physicist. They were X-ray machines used to check the fit of shoes and to promote sales, especially to children. Children were particularly fascinated by the sight of their footbones. X-rays were often taken several times daily to evaluate the fit of different shoes. Most were available in shoe stores until the early 1970s. The energy dose absorbed by the customer was up to 116 rads, or 1.16 grays. In the 1950s, when medical knowledge of the health risks was already available, pedoscopes came with warnings that shoe-buyers should not be scanned more than three times a day and twelve times a year.

By the early 1950s, several professional organizations issued warnings against the continued use of shoe-mounted fluoroscopes, including the American Conference of Governmental Industrial Hygienists, the American College of Surgeons, the New York Academy of Medicine, and the American College of Radiology. At the same time, the District of Columbia enacted regulations requiring that shoe-mounted fluoroscopes be operated only by a licensed physical therapist. A few years later, the state of Massachusetts passed regulations stating that these machines could only be operated by a licensed physician. In 1957, the use of shoe-mounted fluoroscopes was banned by court order in Pennsylvania. By 1960, these measures and pressure from insurance companies led to the disappearance of the shoe-mounted fluoroscope, at least in the United States.

In Switzerland, there were 1,500 shoe-mounted fluoroscopes in use, 850 were required to be inspected by the Swiss Electrotechnical Association by a decree of the Federal Department of Home Affairs on October 7, 1963. The last one was decommissioned in 1990.

In Germany, the machines were not banned until 1976. The fluoroscopy machine emitted uncontrolled X-rays, which continuously exposed children, parents, and sales staff. The all-wood cabinet of the machine did not prevent the X-rays from passing through, resulting in particularly high cumulative radiation levels for the cashier when the pedoscope was placed near the cash register. It is clear that the machine was not designed with proper safety measures in place, leading to dangerous levels of radiation exposure. The well-established long-term effects of X-rays, including genetic damage and carcinogenicity, suggest that the use of pedoscopes worldwide over several decades may have contributed to health effects. However, it cannot be definitively proven that they were the sole cause. For example, a direct link has been discussed in the case of basal cell carcinoma of the foot. In 1950, a case was published in which a shoe model had to have a leg amputated as a result.

==== Radiotherapy ====
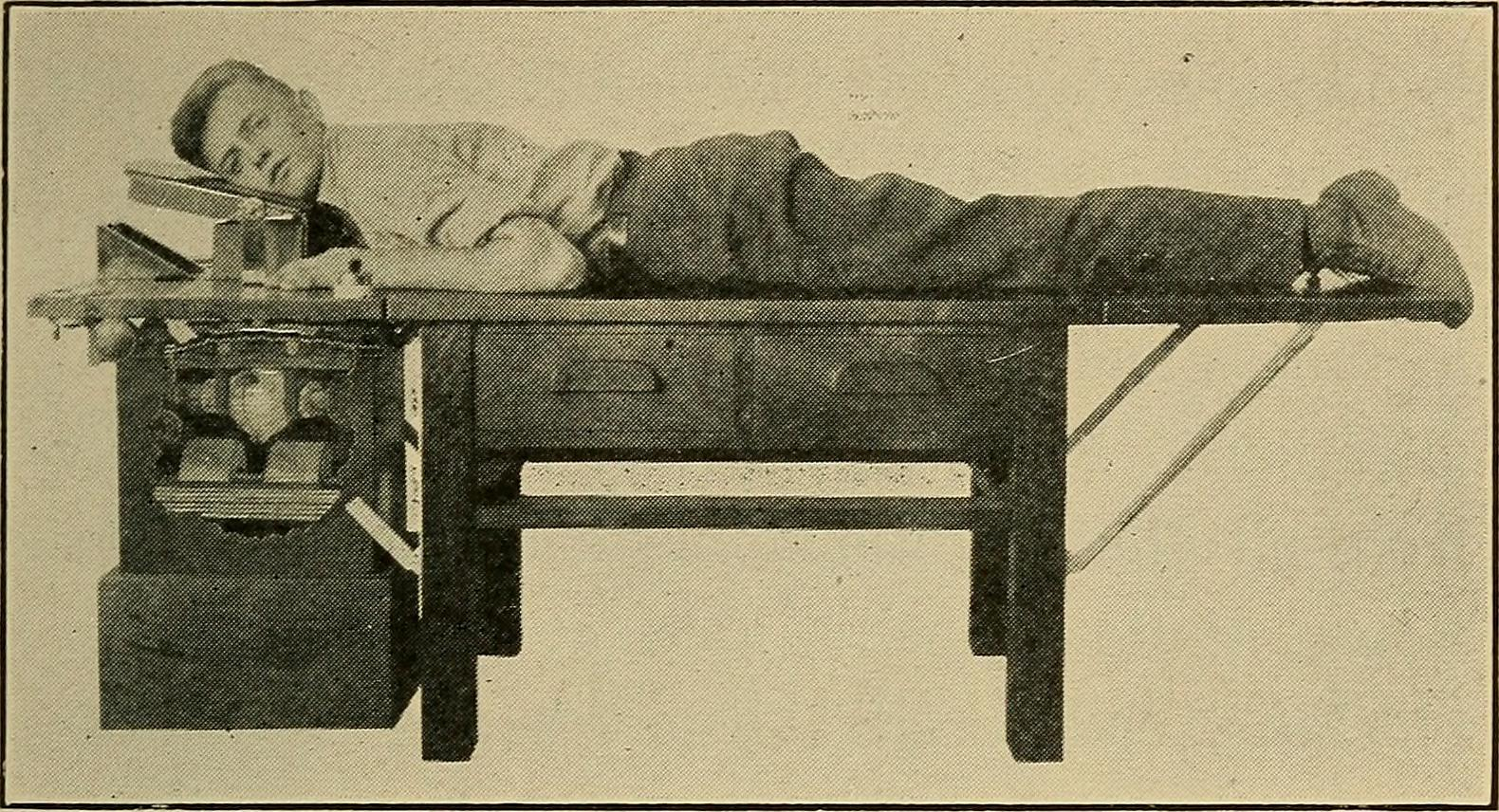
X-ray therapy for diphtheria, 1922. The X-ray table was designed specifically for the treatment of children to eliminate the dangers of high voltage wires.

In 1896, Viennese dermatologist Leopold Freund (1868-1943) used X-rays to treat patients for the first time. He successfully irradiated the hairy nevus of a young girl. In 1897, Hermann Gocht (1869–1931) published the treatment of trigeminal neuralgia with X-rays, and Alexei Petrovich Sokolov (1854-1928) wrote about radiotherapy for arthritis in the oldest radiology journal, Advances in the field of X-rays (RöFo). In 1922, X-rays were recommended as safe for many diseases and for diagnostic purposes. Radiation protection was limited to recommending doses that would not cause erythema (reddening of the skin). For example, X-rays were promoted as an alternative to tonsillectomy. It was also boasted that in 80% of cases of diphtheria carriers, Corynebacterium diphtheriae was no longer detectable within two to four days. In the 1930s, Günther von Pannewitz (1900–1966), a radiologist from Freiburg, Germany, perfected what he called X-ray stimulation radiation for degenerative diseases. Low-dose radiation reduces the inflammatory response of tissues. Until about 1960, children with diseases such as ankylosing spondylitis or favus (head fungus) were irradiated, which was effective but led to increased cancer rates among patients decades later. In 1926, the American pathologist James Ewing (1866-1943) was the first to observe bone changes as a result of radiotherapy, which he described as radiation osteitis (now Osteoradionecrosis). In 1983, Robert E. Marx stated that osteoradionecrosis is radiation-induced aseptic bone necrosis. The acute and chronic inflammatory processes of osteoradionecrosis are prevented by the administration of steroidal anti-inflammatory drugs. In addition, the administration of pentoxifylline and antioxidant treatments, such as superoxide dismutase and tocopherol (vitamin E) are recommended.

== Radiation protection during X-ray examinations ==
=== Preliminary observation ===
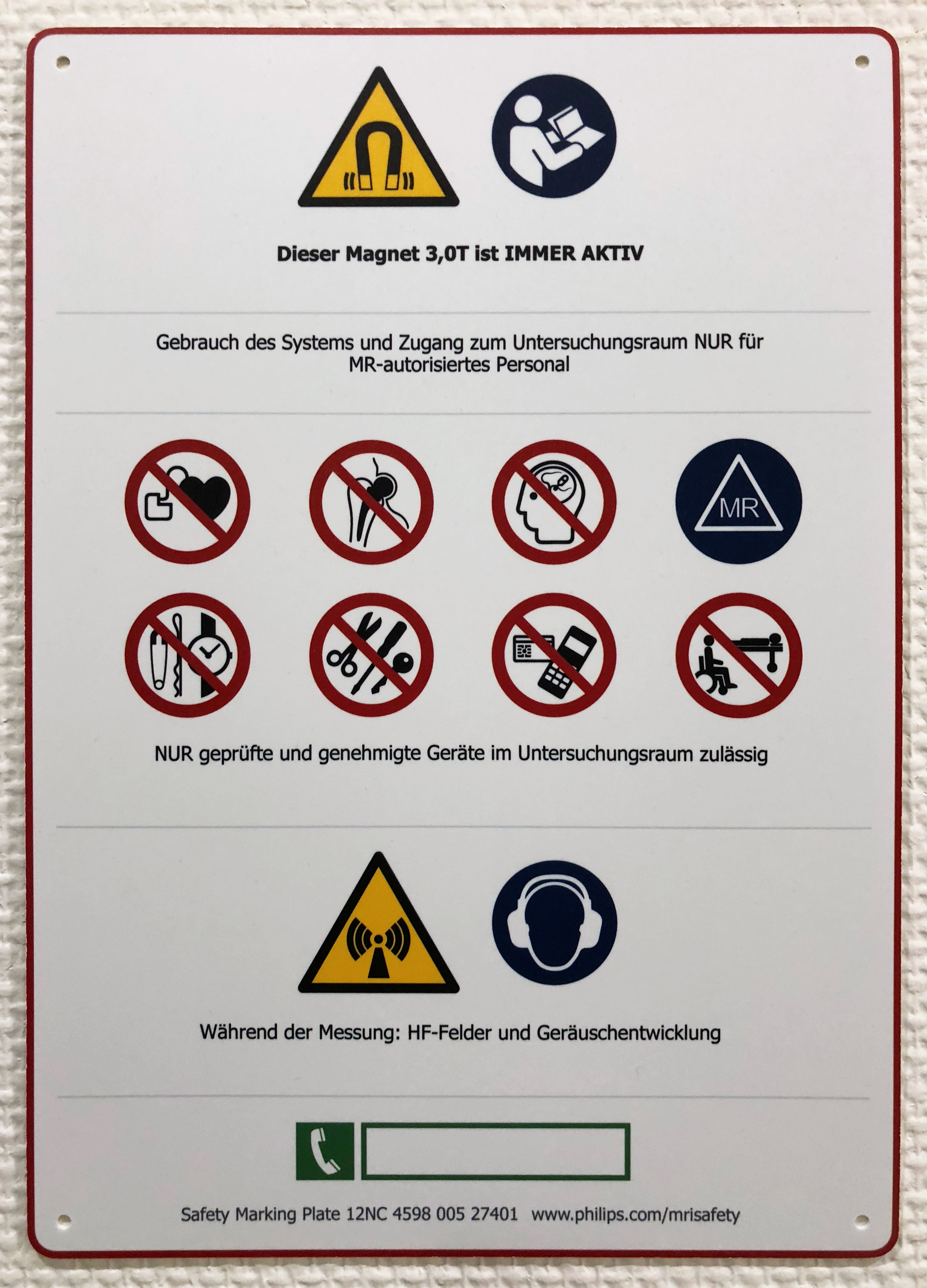
Warning sign for MRI scans

Sonography (ultrasound diagnostics) is a versatile and widely used imaging modality in medical diagnostics. Ultrasound is also used in therapy. However, it uses mechanical waves and no ionizing or non-ionizing radiation. Patient safety is ensured if the recommended limits for avoiding cavitation and overheating are observed, see also Safety Aspects of Sonography.

Even devices that use alternating magnetic fields in the radiofrequency range, such as magnetic resonance imaging (MRI), do not use ionizing radiation. MRI was developed as an imaging technique in 1973 by Paul Christian Lauterbur (1929-2007) with significant contributions from Sir Peter Mansfield (1933-2017). Jewelry or piercings can become very hot; on the other hand, a high tensile force is exerted on the jewelry, which in the worst case can cause it to be torn out. To avoid pain and injury, jewelry containing ferromagnetic metals should be removed beforehand. Pacemakers, defibrillator systems, and large tattoos in the examination area that contain metallic color pigments may heat up or cause second-degree burns or malfunction of the implants.

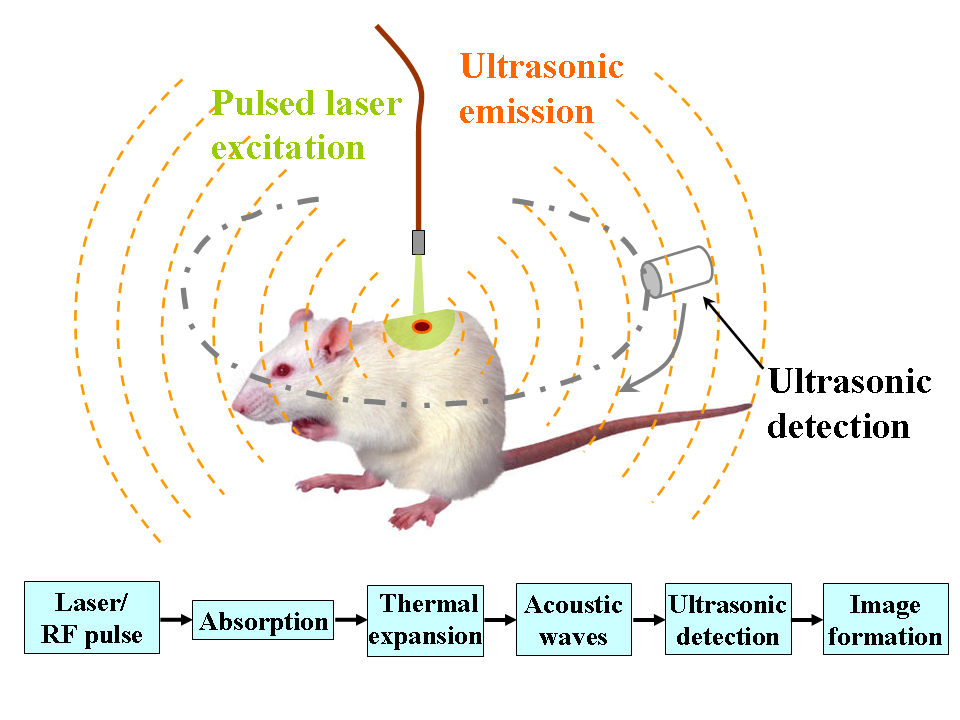
Schematic representation of Photoacoustic Tomography

Photoacoustic Tomography (PAT) is a hybrid imaging modality that utilizes the photoacoustic effect without the use of ionizing radiation. It works without contact with very fast laser pulses that generate ultrasound in the tissue under examination. The local absorption of the light leads to sudden local heating and the resulting thermal expansion. The result is broadband acoustic waves. The original distribution of absorbed energy can be reconstructed by measuring the outgoing ultrasound waves with appropriate ultrasound transducers.

=== Radiation exposure detection ===
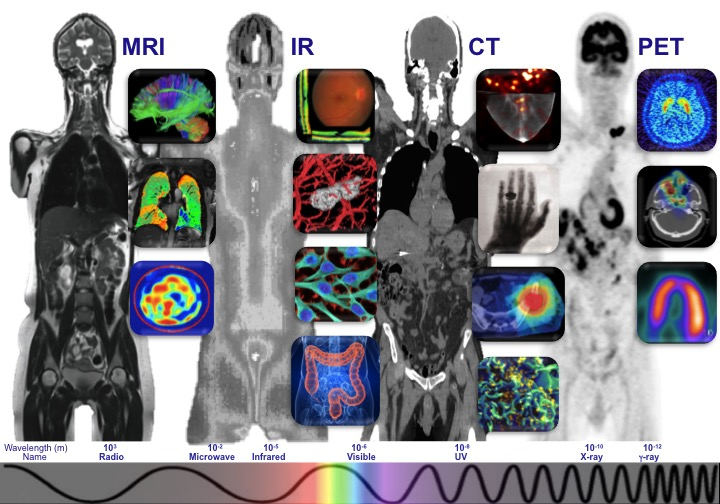
Types of radiation for various examination procedures in radiology: MRI, IR, CT, PET

In order to better assess radiation protection, the number of X-ray examinations, including the dose, has been recorded annually in Germany since 2007. However, the Federal Statistical Office does not have complete data for conventional X-ray examinations. In 2014, the total number of X-ray examinations in Germany was estimated to be about 135 million, of which about 55 million were dental X-ray examinations. The average effective dose from x-ray examinations per inhabitant in Germany in 2014 was about 1.55 mSv (about 1.7 x-ray examinations per inhabitant per year). The proportion of dental X-rays is 41%, but accounts for only 0.4% of the collective effective dose.

In Germany, Section 28 of the X-ray Ordinance (RöV) has required since 2002 that the attending physician must have an X-ray pass available for X-ray examinations and offer it to the patient. The pass contains information about the patient's X-rays to avoid unnecessary examinations and to allow comparison with previous images. With the entry into force of the new Radiation Protection Ordinance on December 31, 2018, this obligation no longer applies. In Austria and Switzerland, x-ray passports have so far been available voluntarily. In principle, there must always be both a justifiable indication for the use of X-rays and the informed consent of the patient. In the context of medical treatment, informed consent refers to the patient's agreement to all types of interventions and other medical measures. § 630d Act of (in German)

=== Radiation reduction ===
Over the years, there have been increasing efforts to reduce radiation exposure to therapists and patients.

==== Radiation protective clothing ====
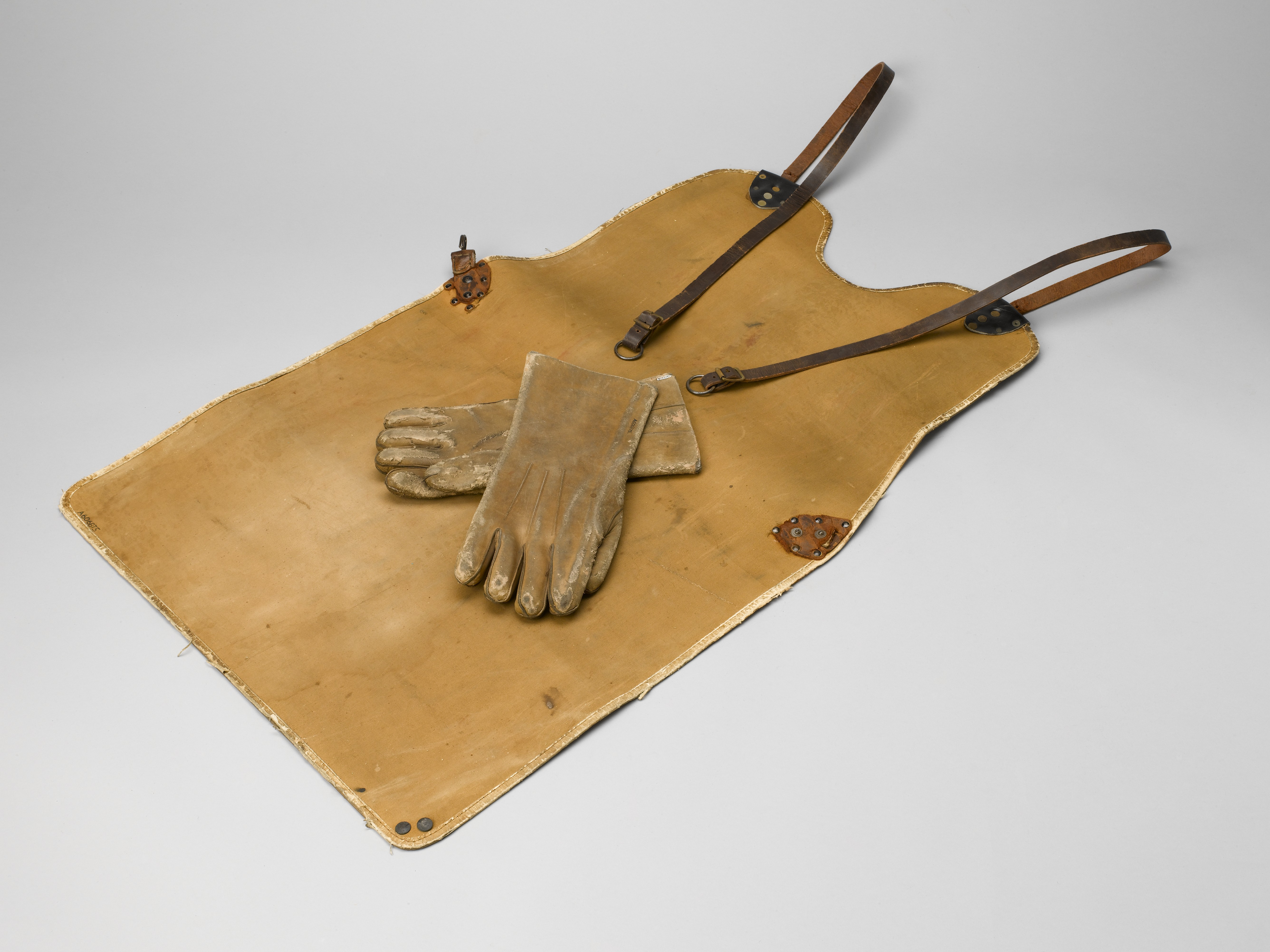
First lead aprons and lead gloves to protect against X-rays, around 1920

Following Rollins' discovery in 1920 that lead aprons protected against X-rays, lead aprons with a lead thickness of 0.5 mm were introduced. Due to their weight, lead-free and lead-reduced aprons were subsequently developed. In 2005, it was recognized that in some cases the protection was significantly less than wearing lead aprons. The lead-free aprons contain tin, antimony and barium, which have the property of producing intense radiation (X-ray fluorescence radiation) when irradiated. In Germany, the Radiology Standards Committee has taken up the issue and introduced a German standard (DIN 6857-1) in 2009. The international standard IEC 61331-3:2014 was finally published in 2014. Protective aprons that do not comply with DIN 6857-1 of 2009 or the new IEC 61331-1 of 2014 may result in higher exposures. There are two classes of lead equivalency classes: 0.25 mm and 0.35 mm. The manufacturer must specify the area weight in kg/m^{2} at which the protective effect of a pure lead apron of 0.25 or 0.35 mm Pb is achieved. The protective effect of an apron shall be appropriate to the energy range used, up to 110 kV for low energy aprons and up to 150 kV for high energy aprons.

If necessary, lead glass panels must also be used, with the front panels having a lead equivalent of 0.5-1.0 mm, depending on the application, and the side shields having a lead equivalent of 0.5-0.75 mm.

Outside the useful beam, radiation exposure is primarily caused by scattered radiation from the tissue being scanned. During examinations of the head and torso, this scattered radiation can spread throughout the body and is difficult to shield with radiation protective clothing. Fears that a lead apron will prevent radiation from leaving the body are unfounded, however, because lead absorbs radiation rather than scattering it.

When preparing an orthopantomogram (OPG) for a dental overview radiograph, it is sometimes recommended not to wear a lead apron, as it does little to shield scattered radiation from the jaw area, but may hinder the rotation of the imaging device. However, according to the 2018 X-ray regulation, it is still mandatory to wear a lead apron when taking an OPG.

==== X-ray intensifier foils ====
In the same year as the discovery of X-rays, Mihajlo Idvorski Pupin (1858-1935) invented the method of placing a sheet of paper coated with fluorescent substances on the photographic plate, drastically reducing the exposure time and thus the radiation exposure. 95% of the film was blackened by the intensifying film and only the remaining 5% was directly blackened by the X-rays. Thomas Alva Edison identified the blue-emitting calcium tungstate (CaWO4) as a suitable phosphor, which quickly became the standard for X-ray intensifying film. In the 1970s, calcium tungstate was replaced by even better and finer intensifying films with rare earth-based phosphors (terbium-activated lanthanum oxybromide, gadolinium oxysulfide). The use of intensifying films in dental film production did not become widespread because of the loss of image quality. The combination with high-sensitivity films further reduced radiation exposure.

==== Anti-scatter grid ====
An anti-scatter grid is a device in X-ray technology that is placed in front of the image receiver (screen, detector, or film) and reduces the incidence of diffuse radiation on it. The first diffusion radiation grid was developed in 1913 by Gustav Peter Bucky (1880-1963). The US radiologist Hollis Elmer Potter (1880-1964) improved it in 1917 by adding a moving device. The radiation dose must be increased when using scattered radiation grids. For this reason, the use of scattered radiation equipment should not be used on children. In digital radiography, a grid may be omitted under certain conditions to reduce radiation exposure to the patient.

==== Radiation protection splint ====
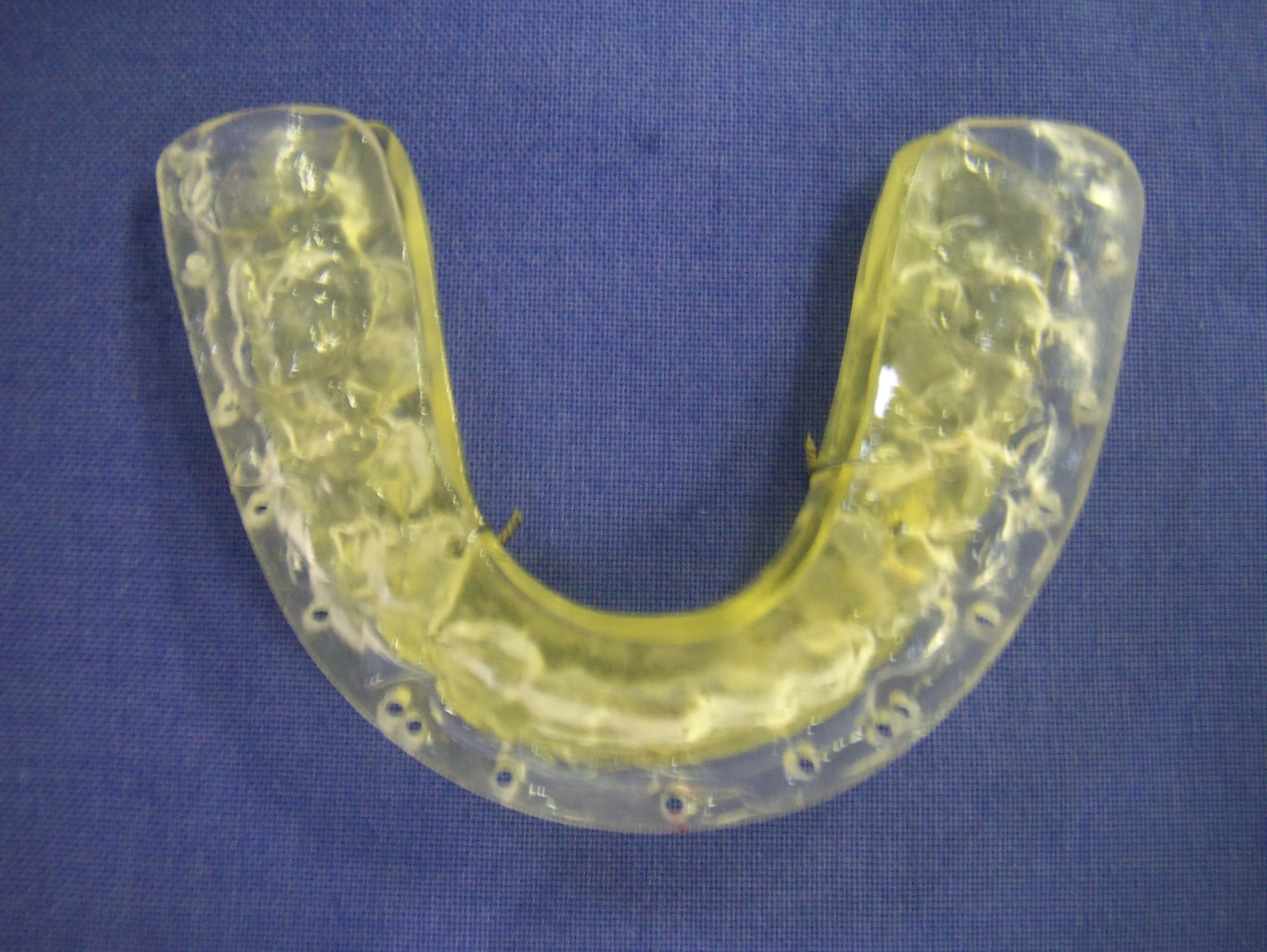
Radiation protection splint

Radiation protection measures may also be necessary against scattered radiation, which occurs during tumor irradiation of the head and neck on metal parts of the dentition (dental fillings, bridges, etc.). Since the 1990s, soft tissue retractors known as radiation protection splints have been used to prevent or reduce mucositis, an inflammation of the mucous membranes. It is the most significant adverse acute side effect of radiation. The radiation protection splint is a spacer that keeps the mucosa away from the teeth and reduces the amount of scattered radiation that hits the mucosa according to the square law of distance. Mucositis, which is extremely painful, is one of the most significant detriments to a patient's quality of life and often limits radiation therapy, thereby reducing the chances of tumor cure. The splint reduces oral mucosal reactions that typically occur in the second and third third of a radiation series and are irreversible.

==== Panoramic X-ray machine ====
Dental panoramic X-ray (orthopantomography, OPG) using DXIS (Direct X-ray Imaging System) in real-time display

The Japanese Hisatugu Numata developed the first panoramic radiograph in 1933/34. This was followed by the development of intraoral panoramic X-ray units, in which the X-ray tube is placed intraorally (inside the mouth) and the X-ray film extraorally (outside the mouth). At the same time, Horst Beger from Dresden in 1943 and the Swiss dentist Walter Ott in 1946 worked on the Panoramix (Koch & Sterzel), Status X (Siemens) and Oralix (Philips). Intraoral panoramic devices were discontinued at the end of the 1980s because the radiation exposure was too high in direct contact with the tongue and oral mucosa due to the intraoral tube.

==== Digital X-ray ====
Eastman Kodak filed the first patent for digital radiography in 1973. The first commercial CR (Computed Radiology) solution was offered by Fujifilm in Japan in 1983 under the device name CR-101. X-ray imaging plates are used in X-ray diagnostics to record the shadow image of X-rays. The first commercial digital X-ray system for use in dentistry was introduced in 1986 by Trophy Radiology (France) under the name Radiovisiography. Digital x-ray systems help reduce radiation exposure. Instead of film, the machines contain a scintillator that converts the incident X-ray photons either into visible light or directly into electrical impulses.

==== Computer tomography ====
In 1972, the first commercial CT scanner for clinical use went into operation at Atkinsons Morley Hospital in London. Its inventor was the English engineer Godfrey Newbold Hounsfield (1919-2004), who shared the 1979 Nobel Prize in Medicine with Allan McLeod Cormack (1924-1998) for his pioneering work in the field of computed tomography. The first steps toward dose reduction were taken in 1989 in the era of single-slice spiral CT. The introduction of multi-slice spiral computed tomography in 1998 and its continuous development made it possible to reduce the dose by means of dose modulation. The tube current is adjusted, for example by reducing the power for images of the lungs compared to the abdomen. The tube current is modulated during rotation. Because the human body has an approximately oval cross-section, radiation intensity is reduced when radiation is delivered from the front or back, and is increased when radiation is delivered from the side. This dose control also depends on the body mass index. For example, the use of dose modulation in the head and neck region reduces total exposure and organ doses to the thyroid and eye lens by up to 50% without significantly compromising diagnostic image quality. The Computed Tomography Dose Index (CTDI) is used to measure radiation exposure during a CT scan. The CTDI was first defined by the Food and Drug Administration (FDA) in 1981. The unit of measurement for the CTDI is the mGy (milli-Gray). Multiplying the CTDI by the length of the examination volume yields the dose-length product (DLP), which quantifies the total radiation exposure to the patient during a CT scan.

==== Structural protective measures ====
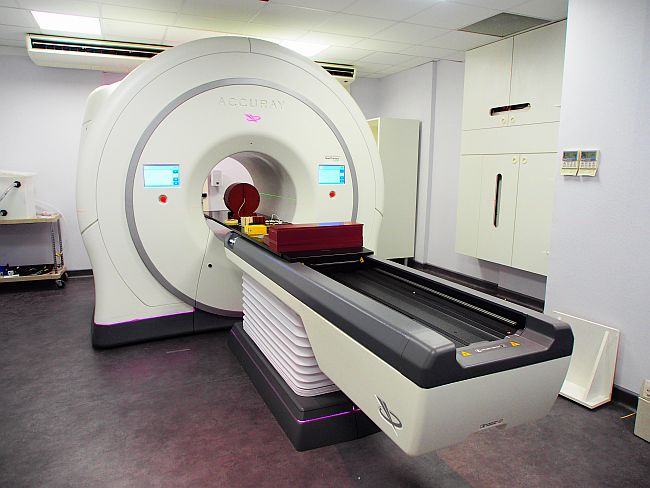
Tomotherapy

An X-ray room must be shielded on all sides with 1 mm lead equivalent shielding. Calcium silicate or solid brick masonry is recommended. A steel jamb should be used, not only because of the weight of the heavy shielding door but also because of the shielding; wooden frames must be shielded separately. The shielding door must be covered with a 1 mm thick lead foil and a lead glass window must be installed as a visual connection. A keyhole shall be avoided. All installations (sanitary or electrical), that interrupt the radiation protection, must be leaded ( § 20 § 20 Röntgenverordnung (röv_1987) [§ 20 X-ray Ordinance] (in German) and § Annex+2 Annex 2 (to § 8 para. 1 sentence 1 RöV) (röv_1987) (in German) Depending on the application, nuclear medicine requires even more extensive protective measures, up to and including concrete walls several meters thick. In addition, from December 31, 2018, when the latest amendments to Section 14 (1) No. 2b of the Radiation Protection Act § 14 Strahlenschutzgesetz – StrlSchG [Radiation Protection Act (StrlSchG)] (in German)

come into force, an expert in medical physics for X-ray diagnostics and therapy must be consulted for the optimization and quality assurance of the application and for advice on radiation protection issues.

=== Certificate of competence ===
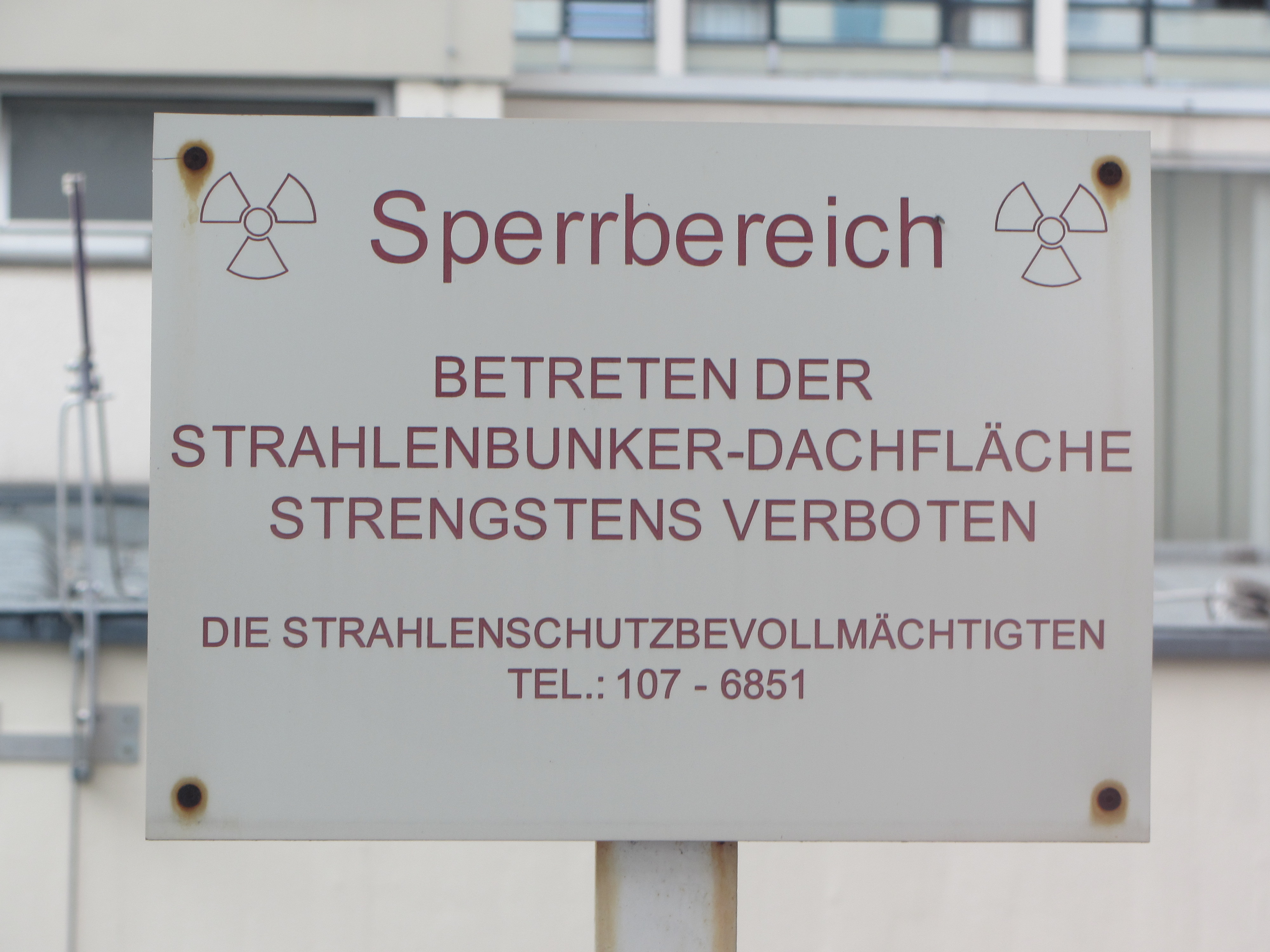
Prohibition sign in the restricted area of Darmstadt Hospital

Each facility operating an x-ray unit shall have sufficient personnel with appropriate expertise. The person responsible for radiation protection or one or more Radiation Safety Officers shall have appropriate qualifications, which shall be regularly updated. X-ray examinations may be technically performed by any other staff member of a medical or dental practice if they are under the direct supervision and responsibility of the person responsible and if they have knowledge of radiation protection.

This knowledge of radiation protection has been required since the amendment of the X-ray Ordinance in 1987; medical and dental assistants (then called medical assistants or dental assistants) received this additional training in 1990. The regulations for the specialty of radiology were tightened by the Radiation Protection Act, which came into force on October 1, 2017.

The handling of radioactive substances and ionizing radiation (if not covered by the X-ray Ordinance) is regulated by the Radiation Protection Ordinance (StrlSchV). Section 30 StrlSchV § 30 StrlSchV (in German) defines the "Required expertise and knowledge in radiation protection".

=== Radiation protection associations ===
The Association of German Radiation Protection Physicians (VDSÄ) was formed in the late 1950s from a working group of radiation protection physicians of the German Red Cross and was founded in 1964. It was dedicated to the promotion of radiation protection and the representation of medical, dental, and veterinary radiation protection concerns to the public and the health care system. In 2017, it was merged into the Professional Association for Radiation Protection. The Austrian Association for Radiation Protection (ÖVS), founded in 1966, pursues the same goals as the Association for Medical Radiation Protection in Austria. The Professional Association for Radiation Protection for Germany and Switzerland is networked worldwide.

== Radiation protection in radiotherapy ==
In radiotherapy, radiation protection is often overlooked in favor of structural safeguards and therapist protection. The benefit/risk assessment should prioritize both the therapeutic goal of treating the patient's cancer and the safety of all involved. However, it is crucial to ensure that radiation is delivered only where it is needed through appropriate treatment planning. By employing strong radiation protection measures, we can confidently provide effective treatment while minimizing potential risks. Linear accelerators replaced cobalt and caesium emitters in routine therapy due to their superior technical characteristics and risk profile. They have been available since about 1970. The presence of a medical physicist responsible for technical quality control is required for linear accelerators, unlike X-rays and telecurie systems. Radiation necrosis is the necrosis of cells in an organism caused by the effects of ionizing radiation. Radionecrosis is a serious complication of radiosurgical treatment that becomes clinically apparent months or years after irradiation. Radiation therapy has significantly reduced the incidence of radionecrosis since its early days. Modern radiation techniques prioritize the sparing of healthy tissue while irradiating as much of the area around the tumor as possible to prevent recurrence. Patients undergoing radiotherapy face a certain level of radiation risk.

== Radiation protection and radiation damage in veterinary medicine ==
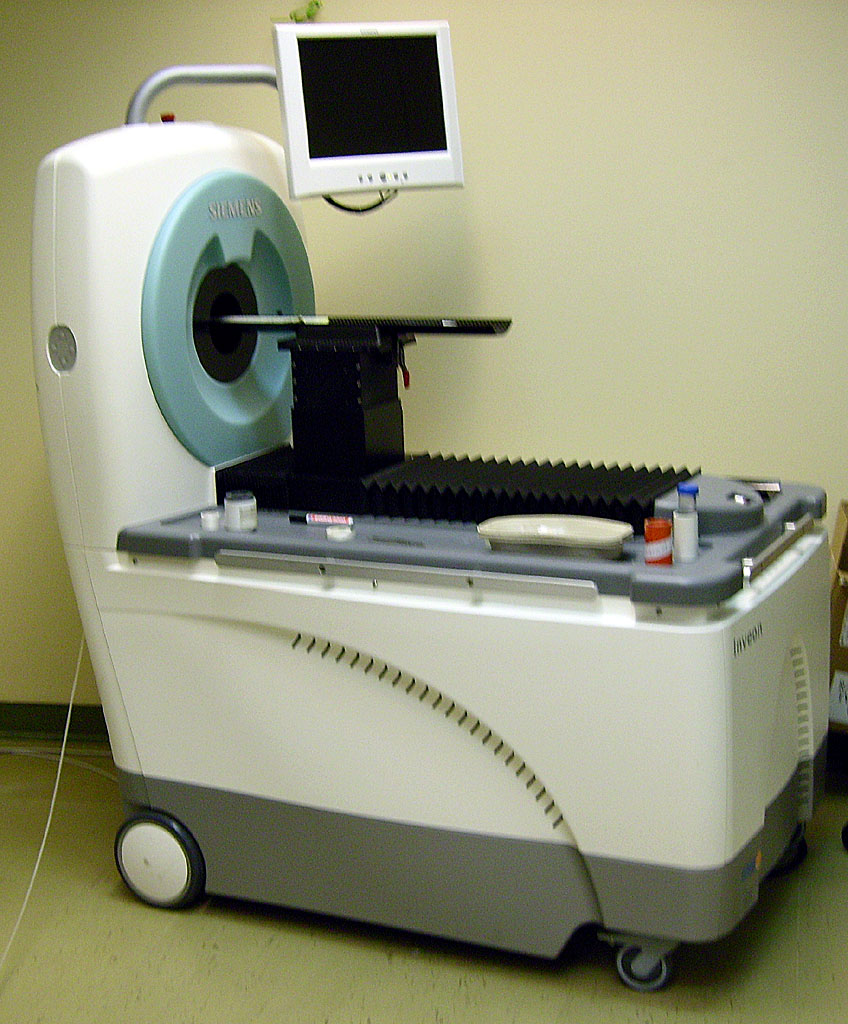
A small animal PET

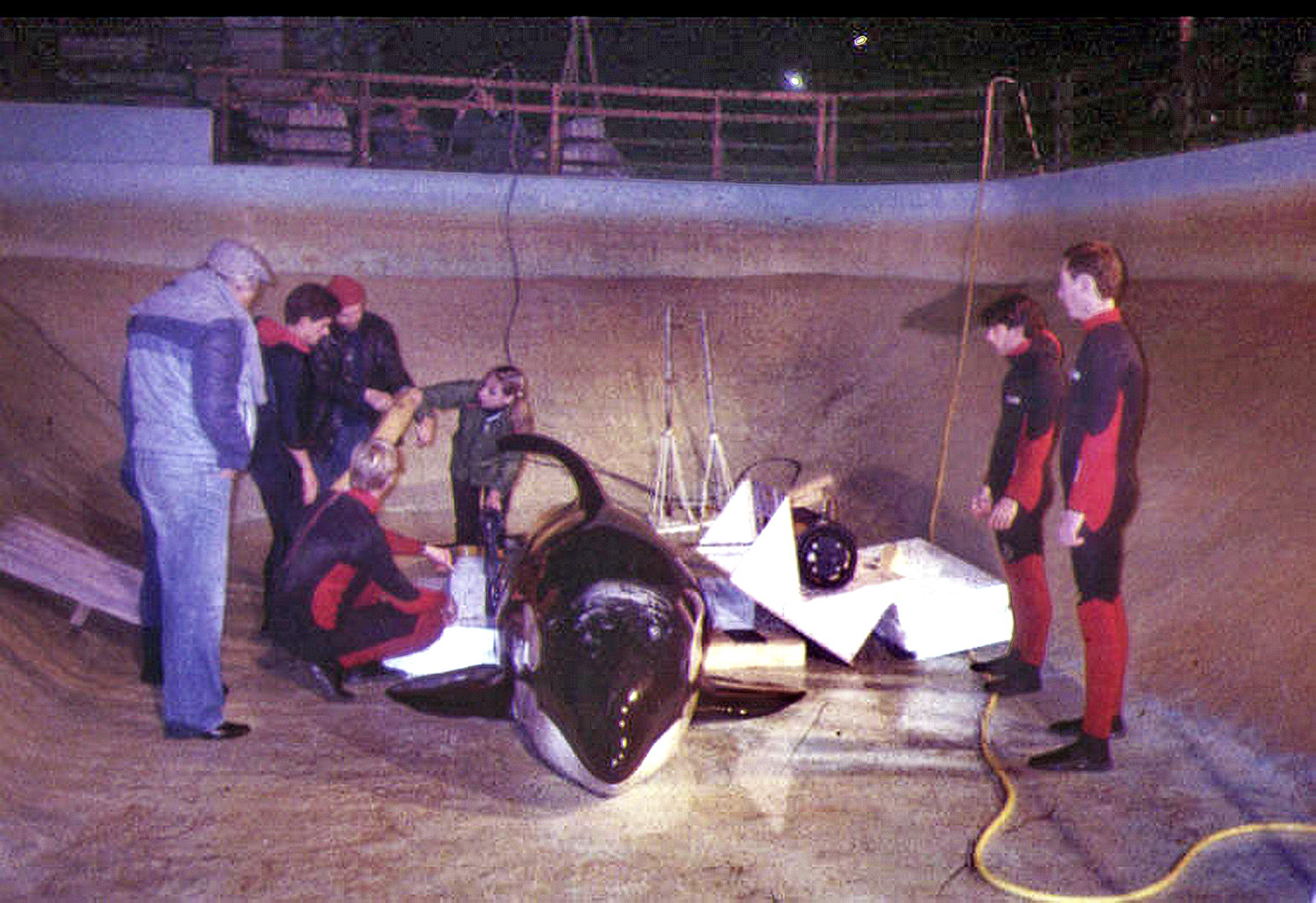
World's first X-ray and ultrasound examination of a killer whale (orca), 1980s

While there is limited literature on radiation injury to animals, there is no evidence of other types of radiation injury. Diagnostic radiation has been shown to cause local burns in animals, typically resulting from prolonged exposure of body parts or sparks from old x-ray tubes. The frequency of injury to veterinary staff and veterinarians is significantly lower than that in human medicine, highlighting the safety of diagnostic radiation in veterinary practice. In veterinary medicine, fewer images are taken compared to human medicine, particularly fewer CT scans. However, due to the manual restraint of animals to avoid anesthesia, at least one person is present in the control area, resulting in significantly higher radiation exposure than that of human medical staff. Since the 1970s, dosimeters have been used to measure the radiation exposure of veterinary personnel, ensuring their safety.

Feline hyperthyroidism (overactive thyroid) is a common disease in older cats. Radioiodine therapy is considered by many authors to be the treatment of choice. Following the administration of radioactive iodine, cats are kept in an isolation pen. The cat's radioactivity is measured to determine the time of discharge, which is typically 14 days after the start of therapy. The therapy requires significant radiation protection measures and is currently only offered at two veterinary facilities in Germany (as of 2010). After the start of treatment, cats must be kept indoors for four weeks, and contact with pregnant women and children under the age of 16 must be avoided due to residual radioactivity.

Just like a medical practice, any veterinary practice operating an X-ray machine must have sufficient staff with the appropriate expertise, as required by Section 18 of the X-Ray Ordinance 2002. The corresponding training for paraveterinary workers (then called veterinary nurses) took place in 1990.

In 2017, Linsengericht (Hesse) opened Europe's first clinic for horses with cancer. Radiation therapy is administered in a treatment room that is eight meters wide, on a specially designed table that can withstand heavyweight. The surrounding area is protected from radiation by three-meter thick walls. Mobile equipment is used to irradiate tumors in small animals at various locations.

== Radioactive substances ==
=== Radon ===
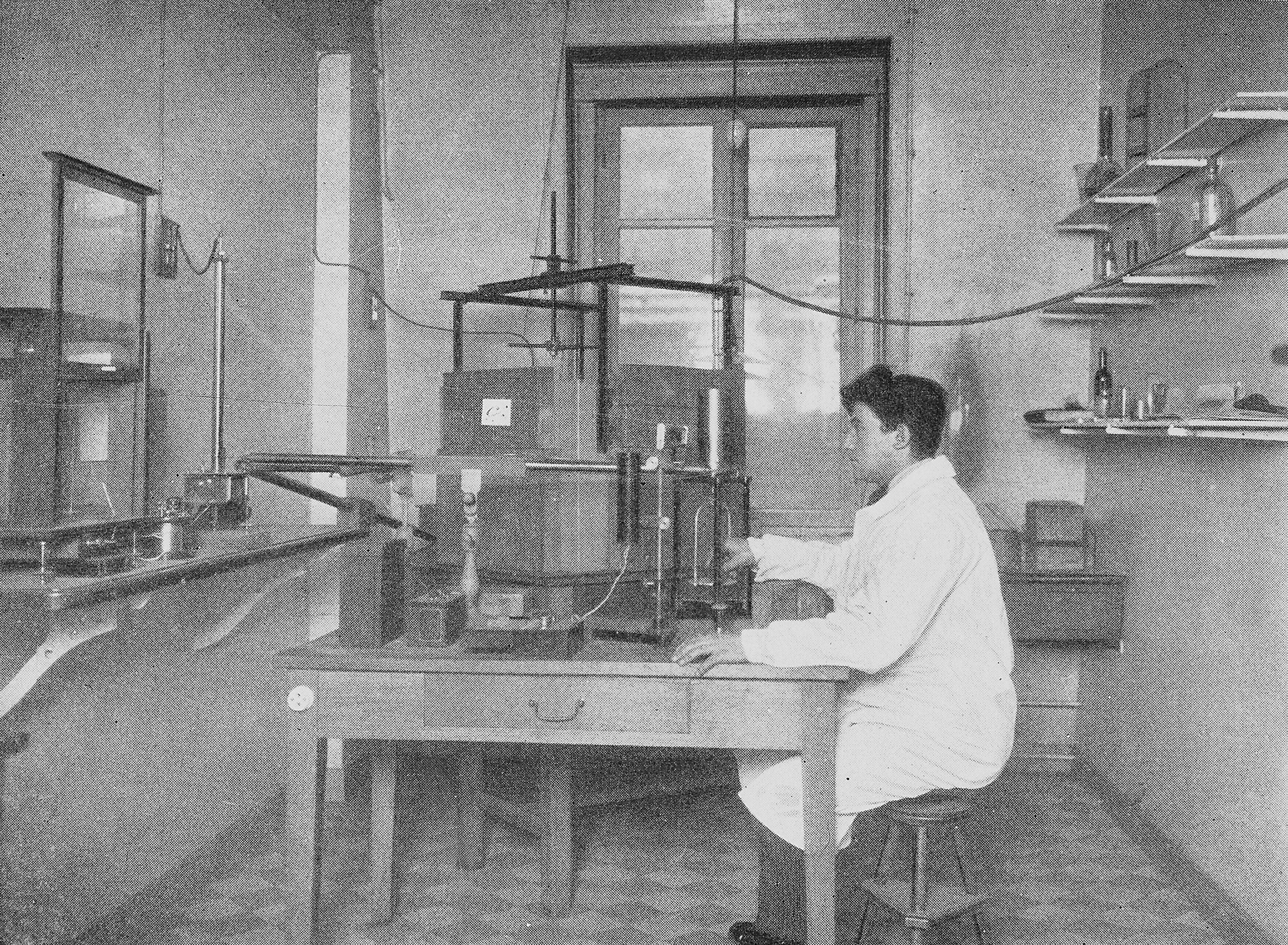
Radon experiments at the Radium Institute in Paris, 1924

Radon is a naturally occurring radioactive noble gas discovered in 1900 by Friedrich Ernst Dorn (1848-1916) and is considered carcinogenic. Radon is increasingly found in areas with high levels of uranium and thorium in the soil. These are mainly areas with high granitic rock deposits. According to studies by the World Health Organization, the incidence of lung cancer increases significantly at radiation levels of 100-200 Bq per cubic meter of indoor air. The likelihood of developing lung cancer increases by 10% with each additional 100 Bq/m^{3} of indoor air.

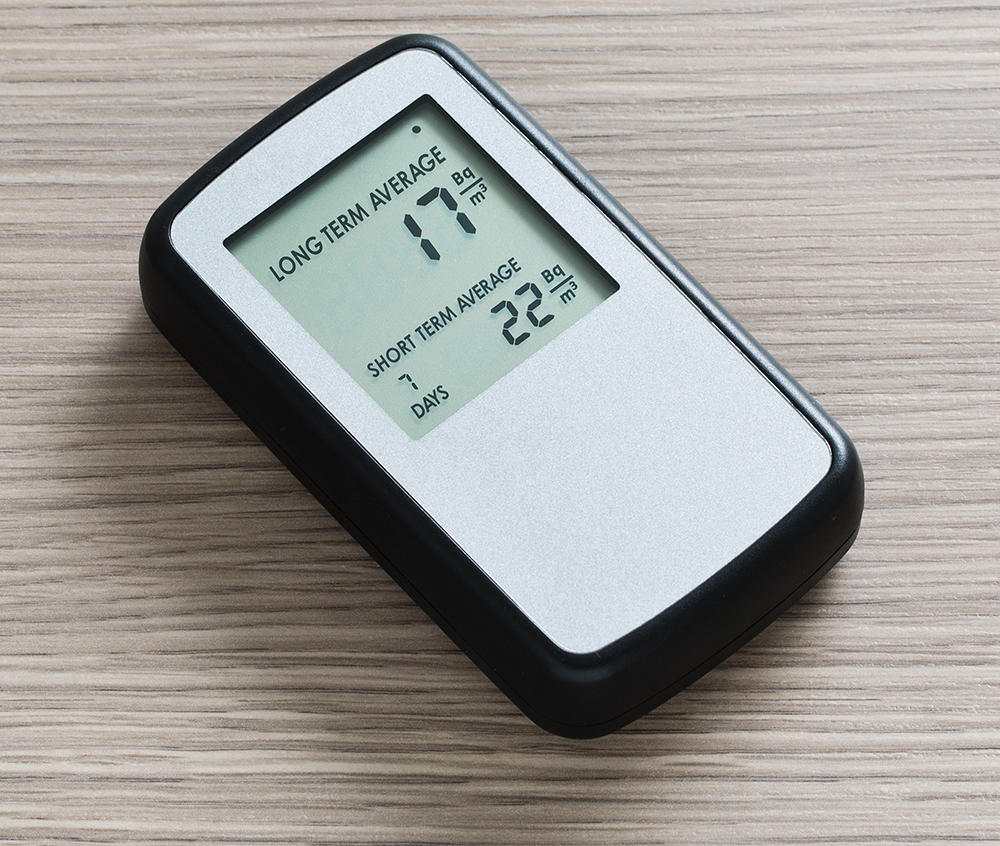
Digital radon detector

Elevated radon levels have been measured in numerous areas in Germany, particularly in southern Germany, Austria and Switzerland.

==== Germany ====
The Federal Office for Radiation Protection has developed a radon map of Germany. The EU Directive 2013/59/Euratom (Radiation Protection Basic Standards Directive) introduced reference levels and the possibility for workers to have their workplace tested for radon exposure. In Germany, it was implemented in the Radiation Protection Act (Chapter 2 or Sections 124-132 StrlSchG) § 124-132 StrlSchG (in German) and the amended Radiation Protection Ordinance (Part 4 Chapter 1, Sections 153-158 StrlSchV). § 153-158 Act of (in German) The new radon protection regulations for workplaces and new residential buildings have been binding since January 2019. Extensive radon contamination and radon precautionary areas have been determined by the ministries of the environment of the federal states (as of June 15, 2021).

==== Austria ====
The highest radon concentrations in Austria were measured in 1991 in the municipality of Umhausen in Tyrol. Umhausen has about 2300 inhabitants and is located in the Ötztal valley. Some of the houses there were built on a bedrock of granite gneiss. From this porous subsoil, the radon present in the rock seeped freely into the unsealed cellars, which were contaminated with up to 60,000 Becquerels of radon per cubic meter of air. Radon levels in the apartments in Umhausen have been systematically monitored since 1992. Since then, extensive radon mitigation measures have been implemented in the buildings: New buildings, sealing of cellar floors, forced ventilation of cellars or relocation. Queries in the Austrian Health Information System (ÖGIS) have shown that the incidence of new cases of lung cancer has declined sharply since then. The Austrian National Radon Project (ÖNRAP) has studied radon exposure throughout the country. Austria also has a Radiation Protection Act as a legal basis. Indoor limits were set in 2008 The Austrian Ministry of the Environment states that

"Precautionary measures in radiation protection use the generally accepted model that the risk of lung cancer increases uniformly (linearly) with radon concentration. This means that an increased risk of lung cancer does not only occur above a certain value, but that a guideline or limit value only adjusts the magnitude of the risk in a meaningful way to other existing risks. Achieving a guideline or limit therefore means taking a risk that is still (socially) acceptable. It therefore makes perfect sense to take simple measures to reduce radon levels, even if they are below the guideline values."

— Federal Ministry of Agriculture, Forestry, Environment and Water Management, November 24, 2015, Department I/7 - Radiation Protection

In Austria, the Radon Protection Ordinance in its version of September 10, 2021 is currently in force, which also defines the radon protection areas and radon precautionary areas.

==== Switzerland ====
The aim of the Radon Action Plan 2012-2020 in Switzerland was to incorporate the new international recommendations into the Swiss strategy for protection against radon and thus reduce the number of lung cancer cases attributable to radon in buildings.

On 1 January 2018, the limit value of 1000 Bq/m^{3} was replaced by a reference value of 300 becquerels per cubic meter (Bq/m^{3}) for the radon gas concentration averaged over a year in "rooms in which people regularly spend several hours a day".

Subsequently, on May 11, 2020, the Federal Office of Public Health FOPH issued the Radon Action Plan 2021-2030. The provisions on radon protection are primarily laid down in the Radiation Protection Ordinance (RPO).

==== Radiation sickness among miners ====
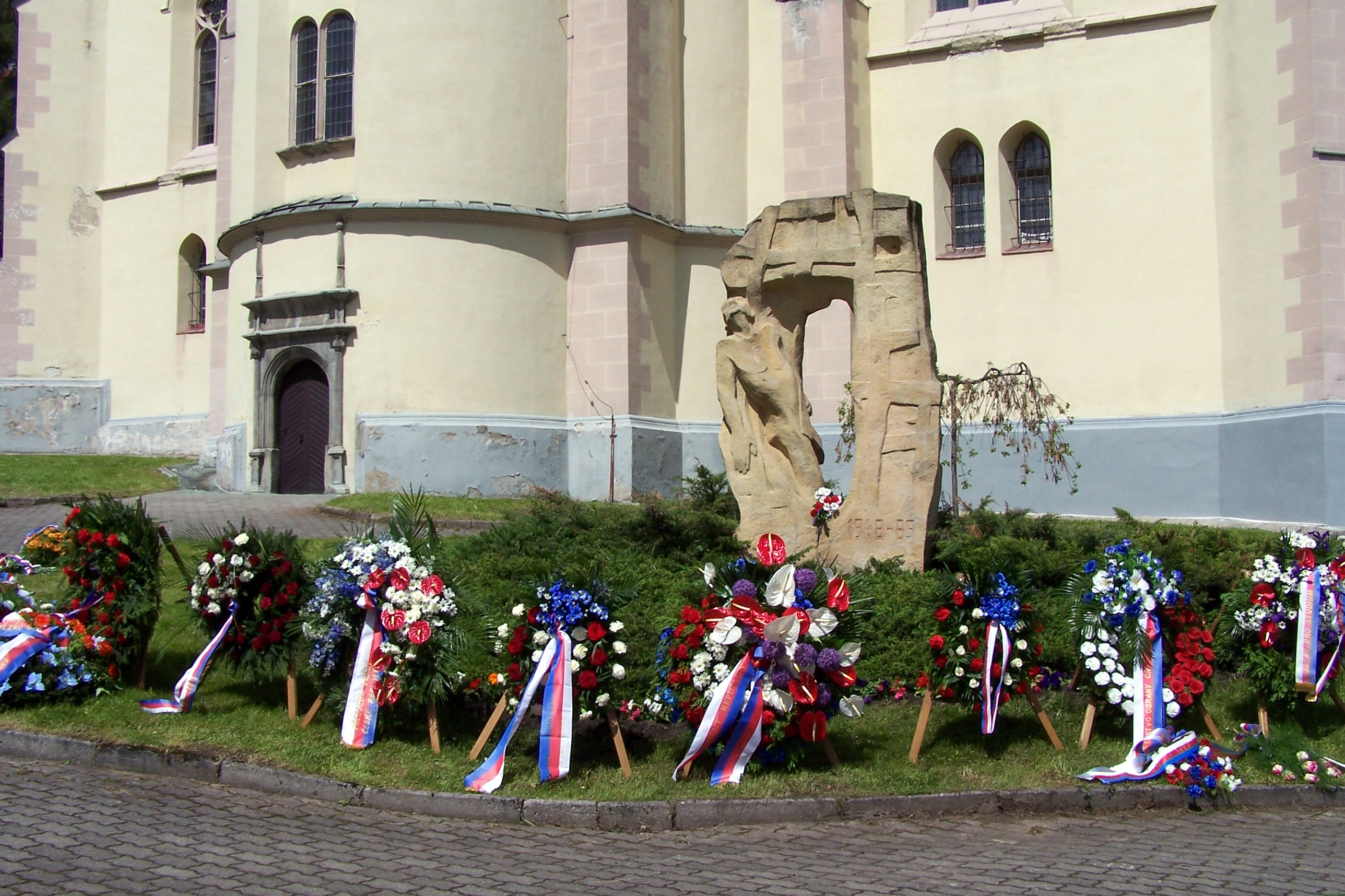
Memorial to the victims of forced labor in Jáchymov (St. Joachimsthal)

In 1879, Walther Hesse (1846-1911) and Friedrich Hugo Härting published the study "Lung Cancer, the Miners' Disease in the Schneeberg Mines". Hesse, a pathologist, was shocked by the poor health and young age of the miners. This particular form of bronchial carcinoma was given the name Schneeberg disease because it occurred among miners in the Schneeberg mines (Saxon Erz Mountains).

When Hesse's report was published, radioactive radiation and the existence of radon were unknown. It was not until 1898 that Marie Curie-Skłodowska (1867-1934) and her husband Pierre Curie (1859-1906) discovered radium and created the concept of radioactivity. Beginning in the fall of 1898, Marie Curie suffered from inflammation of the fingertips, the first known symptoms of radiation sickness.

In the Jáchymov mines, where silver and non-ferrous metals were mined from the 16th to the 19th century, uranium ore was mined in abundance in the 20th century. It was only during the Second World War that restrictions were imposed on ore mining in the Schneeberg and Jáchymov mines. After World War II, uranium mining was accelerated for the Soviet atomic bomb project and the emerging Soviet nuclear industry. Forced labor was used. Initially, these were German prisoners of war and displaced persons, and after the February Revolution of 1948, political prisoners were imprisoned by the Communist Party regime in Czechoslovakia, as well as conscripted civilian workers. Several "Czechoslovak gulags" were established in the area to house these workers. In all, about 100,000 political prisoners and more than 250,000 forced laborers passed through the camps. About half of them probably did not survive the mining work. Uranium mining ceased in 1964. We can only speculate about other victims who died as a result of radiation. Radon-bearing springs discovered during the mining in the early 20th century established a spa industry that is still important today, as well as the town's status as the oldest radium brine spa in the world.

==== Wismut AG ====
The approximately 200,000 uranium miners employed by Wismut AG in the former Soviet occupation zone of East Germany were exposed to very high levels of radiation, particularly between 1946 and 1955, but also in later years. This exposure was caused by the inhalation of radon and its radioactive by-products, which were deposited to a considerable extent in the inhaled dust. Radiation exposure was expressed in the historical unit of working level month (WLM). This unit of measurement was introduced in the 1950s specifically for occupational safety in uranium mines in the U.S. to record radiation exposure resulting from radioactive exposure to radon and its decay products in the air we breathe. Approximately 9000 workers at Wismut AG have been diagnosed with lung cancer.

=== Radium ===
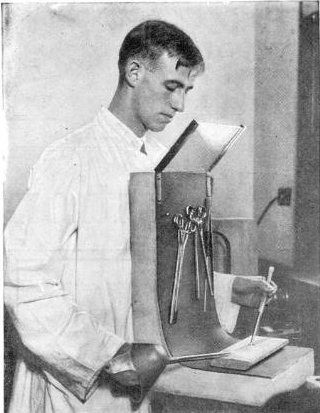
Personal shielding for the work with radium (1929)

Until the 1930s, radium compounds were not only considered relatively harmless, but also beneficial to health, and were advertised as medicines for a variety of ailments or used in products that glowed in the dark. Processing took place without any safeguards.

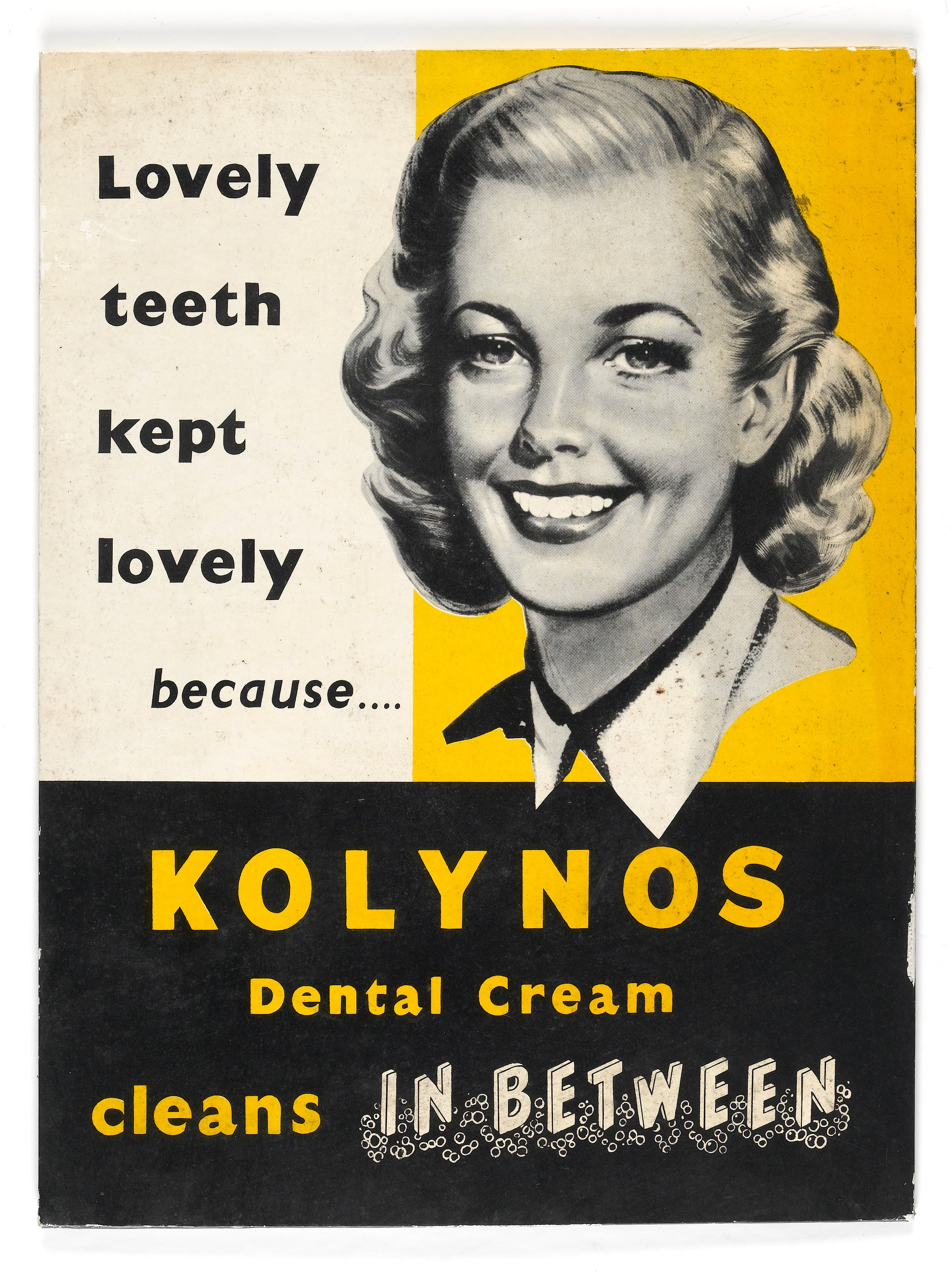
Advertising poster for the toothpaste "Kolynos" from the 1940s

Until the 1960s, radioactivity was often handled naively and carelessly. From 1940 to 1945, the Berlin-based Auergesellschaft, founded by Carl Auer von Welsbach (1858-1929, Osram), produced a radioactive toothpaste called Doramad that contained thorium-X and was sold internationally. It was advertised with the statement, "Its radioactive radiation strengthens the defenses of the teeth and gums. The cells are charged with new life energy and the destructive effect of bacteria is inhibited. This gave the claim of radiant white teeth a double meaning. By 1930, there were also bath additives and eczema ointments under the brand name "Thorium-X". Radium was also added to toothpastes, such as Kolynos toothpaste. After World War I, radioactivity became a symbol of modern achievement and was considered "chic". Radioactive substances were added to mineral water, condoms, and cosmetic powders. Even chocolate laced with radium was sold. The toy manufacturer Märklin in the Swabian town of Göppingen tested the sale of an X-ray machine for children. At upper-class parties, people "photographed" each other's bones for fun. A system called Trycho (Ancient Greek: τριχο-, romanized: tricho-, lit. 'concerning the hair') for epilation (hair removal) of the face and body was franchised in the USA. As a result, thousands of women suffered skin burns, ulcers and tumors. It was not until the atomic bombings of Hiroshima and Nagasaki that the public became aware of the dangers of ionizing radiation and these products were banned.

A radium industry developed, using radium in creams, beverages, chocolates, toothpastes, and soaps. It took a relatively long time for radium and its decay product radon to be recognized as the cause of the observed effects. Radithor, a radioactive agent consisting of triple-distilled water in which the radium isotopes ^{226}Ra and ^{228}Ra were dissolved so that it had an activity of at least one microcurie, was marketed in the United States. It was not until 1932, when the prominent American athlete Eben Byers, who by his own account had taken about 1,400 vials of Radithor as medicine on the recommendation of his physician, fell seriously ill with cancer, lost many of his teeth, and died shortly thereafter in great agony, that strong doubts were raised about the healing powers of Radithor and radium water.

==== Radium cures ====
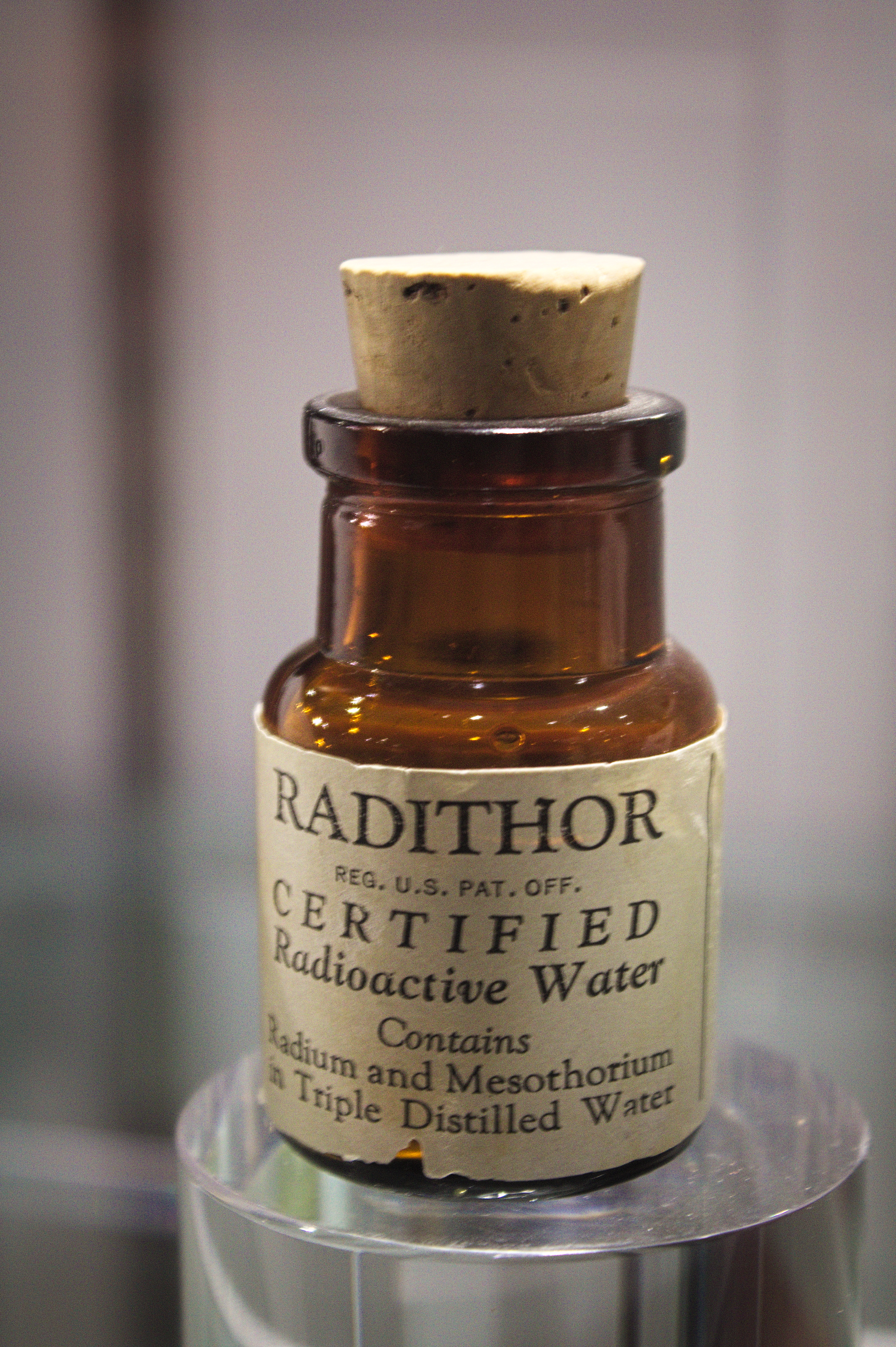
Radithor

1908 saw a boom in the use of radioactive water for therapeutic purposes. The discovery of springs in Oberschlema and Bad Brambach paved the way for the establishment of radium spas, which relied on the healing properties of radium. During the cures, people bathed in radium water, drank cures with radium water, and inhaled radon in emanatoriums. The baths were visited by tens of thousands of people every year, hoping for hormesis.

To this day, therapeutic applications are carried out in spas and healing tunnels. The natural release of radon from the ground is used. According to the German Spa Association, the activity in water must be at least 666 Bq/liter. The requirement for inhalation treatments is at least 37,000 Bq/m^{3} of air. This form of therapy is not scientifically accepted and the potential risk of radiation exposure is criticized. The equivalent dose of a radon cure in Germany is given by the individual health resorts as about one to two millisieverts, depending on the location. In 2010, doctors in Erlangen, using the (outdated) LNT (Linear, No-Threshold) model, concluded that five percent of all lung cancer deaths in Germany are caused by radon. There are radon baths in Bad Gastein, Bad Hofgastein and Bad Zell in Austria, in Niška Banja in Serbia, in the radon revitalization bath in Menzenschwand and in Bad Brambach, Bad Münster am Stein-Ebernburg, Bad Schlema, Bad Steben, Bad Schmiedeberg and Sibyllenbad in Germany, in Jáchymov in the Czech Republic, in Hévíz in Hungary, in Świeradów-Zdrój (Bad Flinsberg) in Poland, in Naretschen and Kostenez in Bulgaria and on the island of Ischia in Italy. There are radon tunnels in Bad Kreuznach and Bad Gastein.

==== Illuminated dials ====
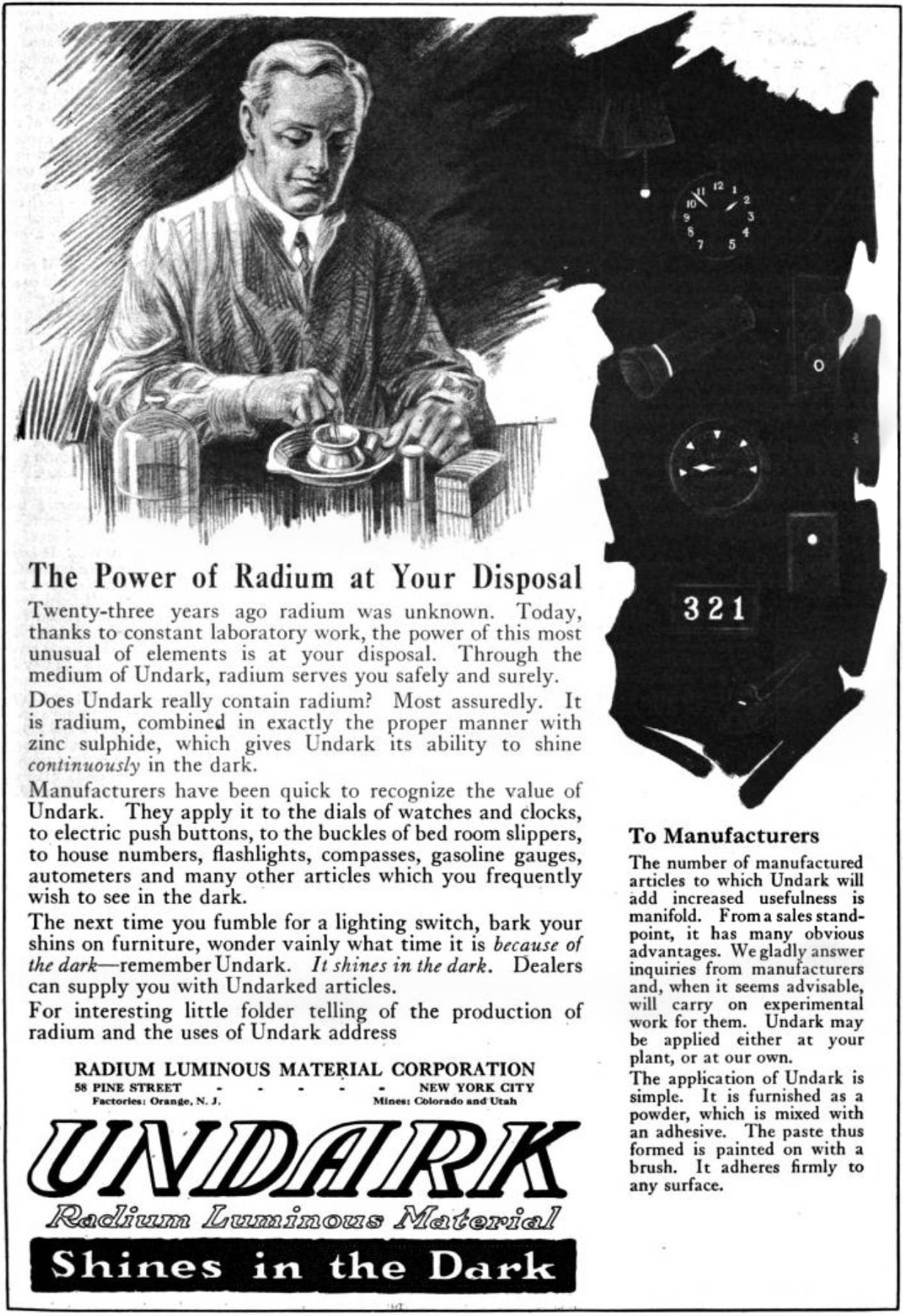
Advertising for luminous dials (1921)

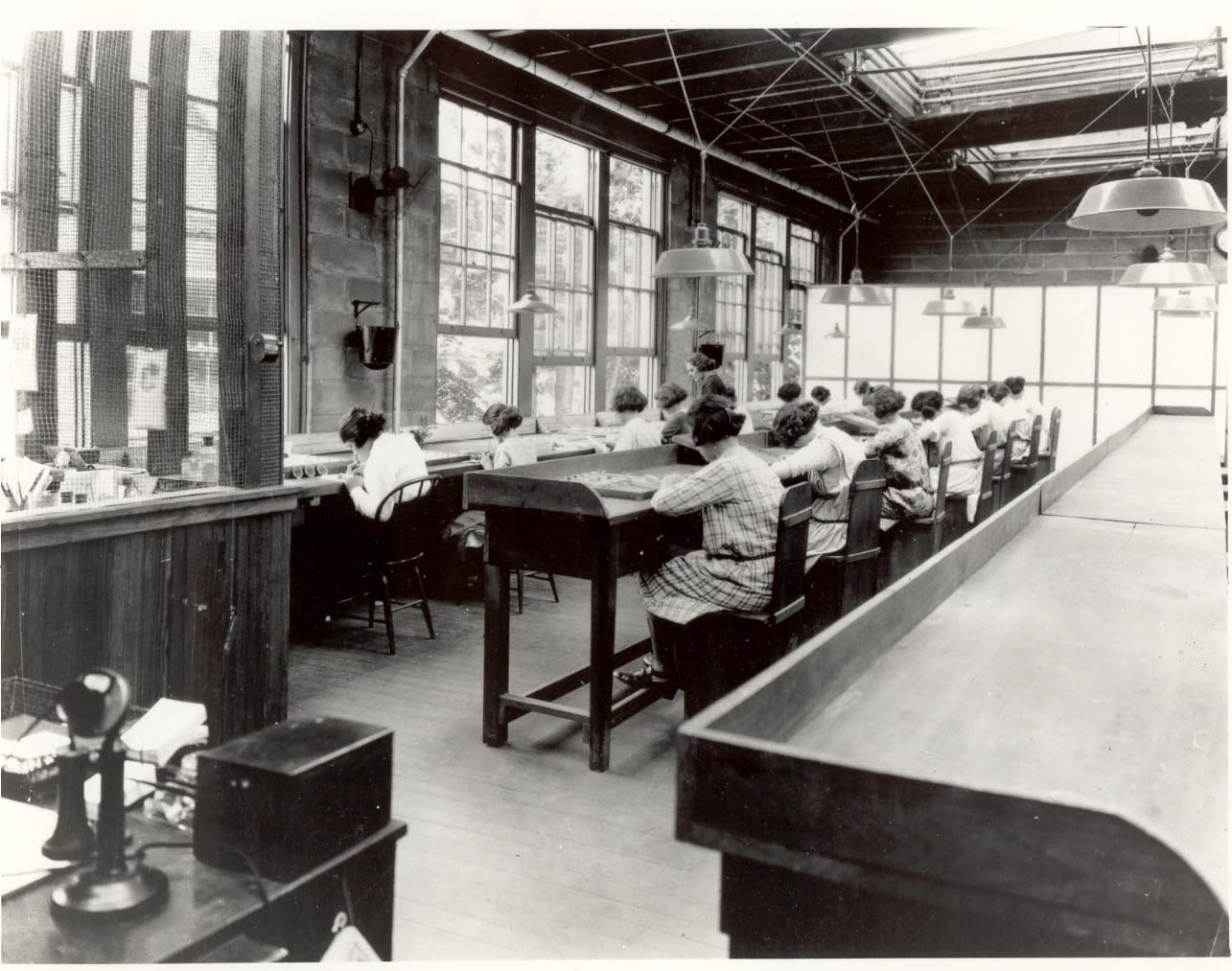
Radium Girls at work in the USA (1922-1923)

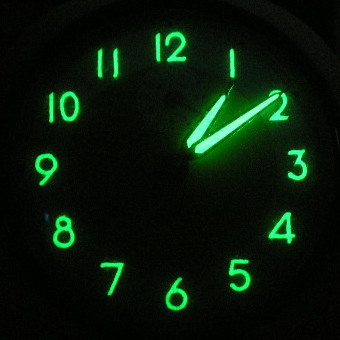
Illuminated dial with radioluminescence

The dangers of radium were recognized in the early 1920s and first described in 1924 by New York dentist and oral surgeon Theodor Blum (1883-1962). He was particularly aware of the use of radium in the watch industry, where it was used for luminous dials. He published an article on the clinical picture of the so-called radium jaw. He observed this disease in female patients who, as dial painters, came into contact with luminous paint whose composition was similar to Radiomir, a luminous material invented in 1914 consisting of a mixture of zinc sulfide and radium bromide. As they painted, they used their lips to form the tip of the phosphorus-laden brush into the desired pointed shape, and this is how the radioactive radium entered their bodies. In the U.S. and Canada alone, about 4,000 workers were affected over the years. In retrospect, the factory workers were called the Radium Girls. They also played with the paint, painting their fingernails, teeth and faces. This made them glow at night to the surprise of their companions.

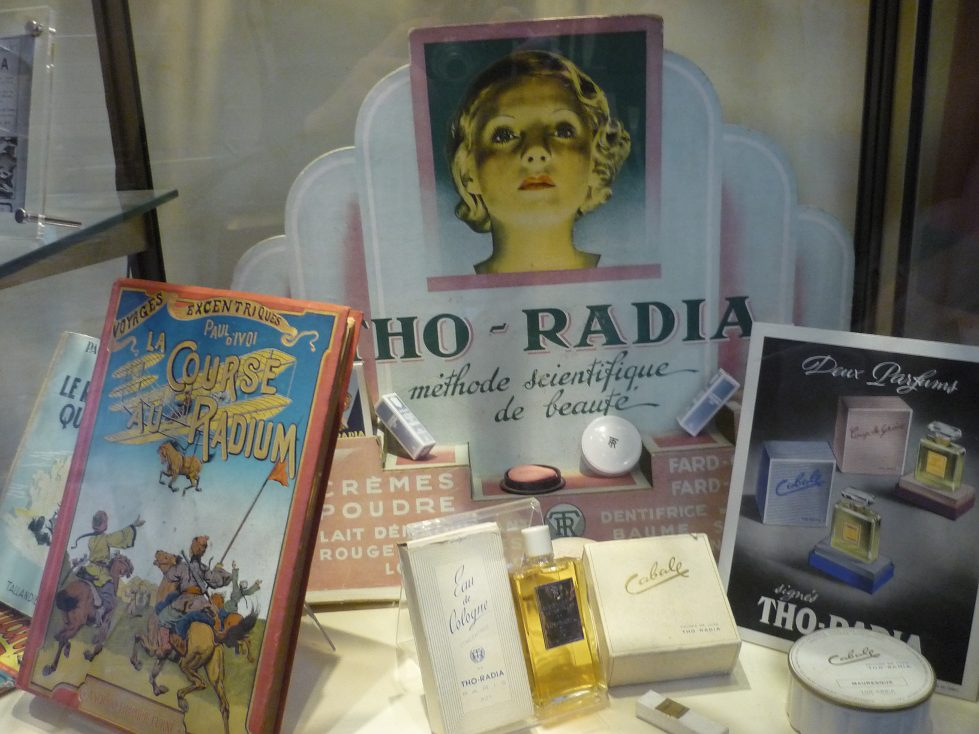
Cosmetic series Tho-Radia. Curie Museum, Paris

After Harrison Stanford Martland (1883-1954), chief medical examiner in Essex County, detected the radioactive noble gas radon (a decay product of radium) in the breath of the Radium Girls, he turned to Charles Norris (1867-1935) and Alexander Oscar Gettler (1883-1968). In 1928, Gettler was able to detect a high concentration of radium in the bones of Amelia Maggia, one of the young women, even five years after her death. In 1931, a method was developed for determining radium dosage using a film dosimeter. A standard preparation is irradiated through a hardwood cube onto an X-ray film, which is then blackened. For a long time, the cube minute was an important unit of radium dosage. It was calibrated by ionometric measurements. The radiologists Hermann Georg Holthusen (1886-1971) and Anna Hamann (1894-1969) found a calibration value of 0.045 r/min in 1932/1935. The calibration film receives the y-ray dose of 0.045 r per minute through the wooden cube from the preparation of 13.33 mg. In 1933, the physicist Robley D. Evans (1907-1995) made the first measurements of radon and radium in the excretions of female workers. On this basis, the National Bureau of Standards, the predecessor to the National Institute of Standards and Technology (NIST), set the limit for radium at 0.1 microcuries (about 3.7 kilobecquerels) in 1941.

A Radium Action Plan 2015-2019 aims to solve the problem of radiological contamination in Switzerland, mainly in the Jura Mountains, due to the use of radium luminous paint in the watch industry until the 1960s.

In France, a line of cosmetics called Tho-Radia, which contained both thorium and radium, was created in 1932 and lasted until the 1960s.

=== Other terrestrial radiation ===
Terrestrial radiation is the ubiquitous radiation on Earth caused by radionuclides in the ground that were formed billions of years ago by stellar nucleosynthesis and have not yet decayed due to their long half-lives. Terrestrial radiation is caused by natural radionuclides that occur naturally in the Earth's soil, rocks, hydrosphere, and atmosphere. Natural radionuclides can be divided into cosmogenic and primordial nuclides. Cosmogenic nuclides do not contribute significantly to the terrestrial ambient radiation at the Earth's surface. The sources of terrestrial radiation are the natural radioactive nuclides found in the uppermost layers of the Earth, in the water and in the air. These include in particular

- Thorium-232 (half-life 14 billion years),
- Uranium-238 (half-life 4.4 billion years),
- Uranium-235 (half-life 0.7 billion years) and
- Potassium-40 (half-life 1.3 billion years).

==== Mining and extraction of fuels ====
According to the World Nuclear Association, coal from all deposits contains traces of various radioactive substances, particularly radon, uranium and thorium. These substances are released during coal mining, especially from surface mines, through power plant emissions, or power plant ash, and contribute to terrestrial radiation exposure through their exposure pathways.

In December 2009, it was revealed that oil and gas production generates millions of tons of radioactive waste each year, much of which is improperly disposed of without detection, including ^{226}Radium and ^{210}Polonium. The specific activity of the waste ranges from 0.1 to 15,000 becquerels per gram. In Germany, according to the Radiation Protection Ordinance of 2001, the material is subject to monitoring at one Becquerel per gram and would have to be disposed of separately. The implementation of this regulation has been left to the industry, which has disposed of the waste carelessly and improperly for decades.

==== Building material ====
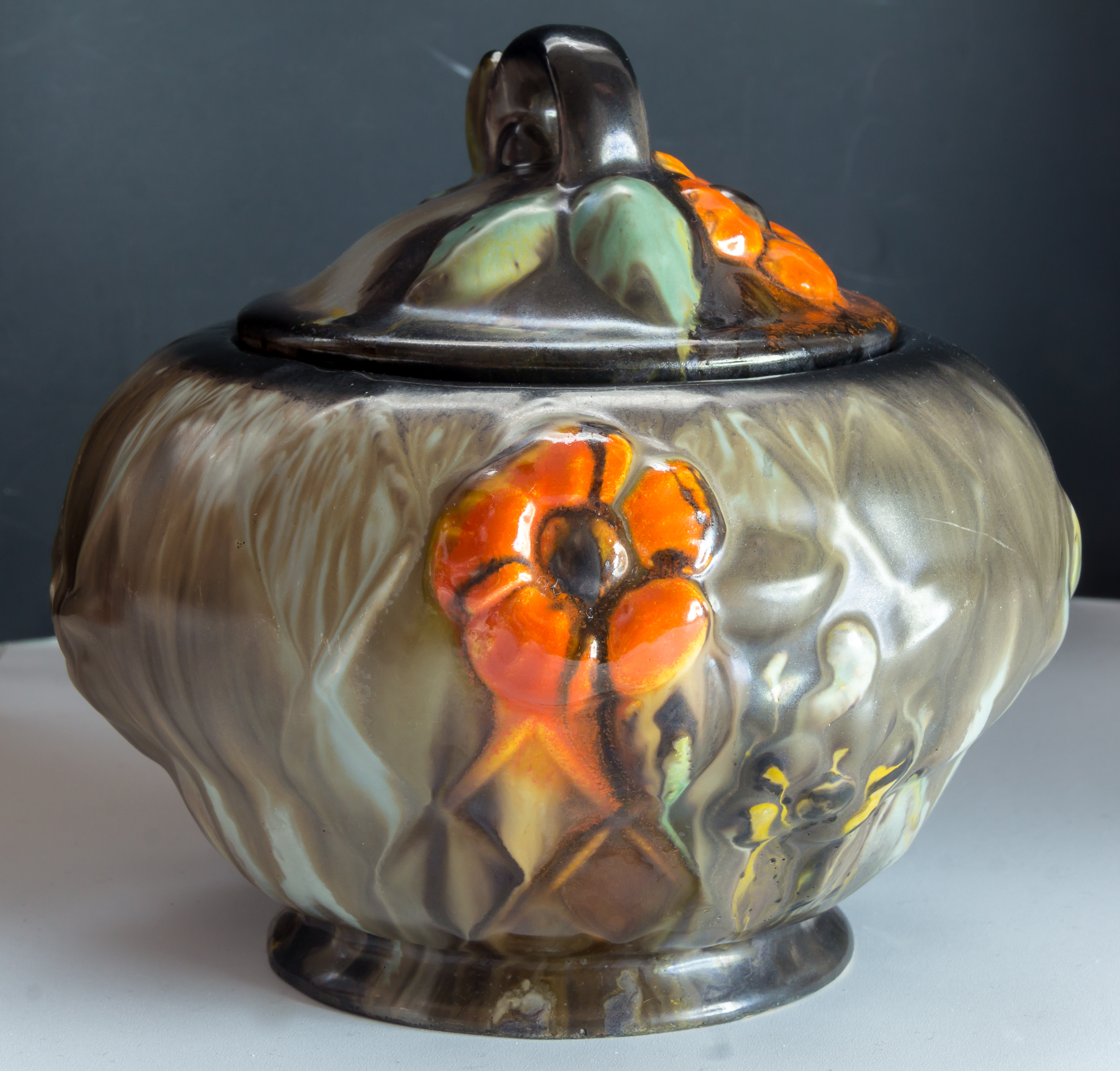
Uranium glazed ceramic cookie jar

Every building material contains traces of natural radioactive substances, especially ^{238}uranium, ^{232}thorium, and their decay products, and ^{40}potassium. Solidified and effusive rocks such as granite, tuff, and pumice have higher levels of radioactivity. In contrast, sand, gravel, limestone, and natural gypsum (calcium sulfate dihydrate) have low levels of radioactivity. The European Union's Activity Concentration Index (ACI), developed in 1999, can be used to assess radiation exposure from building materials. It replaces the Leningrad summation formula, which was used in 1971 in Leningrad (St. Petersburg) to determine how much radiation exposure from building materials is permissible for humans. The ACI is calculated from the sum of the weighted activities of ^{40}potassium, ^{226}radium, and ^{232}thorium. The weighting takes into account the relative harmfulness to humans. According to official recommendations, building materials with a European ACI value greater than "1" should not be used in large quantities.

==== Glazes ====
Uranium pigments are used to color ceramic tiles with uranium glazes (red, yellow, brown), where 2 mg of uranium per cm^{2} is allowed. Between 1900 and 1943, large quantities of uranium-containing ceramics were produced in the United States, as well as in Germany and Austria. It is estimated that between 1924 and 1943, 50-150 tons of uranium (V,VI) oxide were used annually in the U.S. to produce uranium-containing glazes. In 1943, the U.S. government imposed a ban on the civilian use of uranium-containing substances, which remained in effect until 1958. Beginning in 1958, the U.S. government, and in 1969 the United States Atomic Energy Commission, sold depleted uranium in the form of uranium(VI) fluoride for civilian use. In Germany, uranium-glazed ceramics were produced by the Rosenthal porcelain factory and were commercially available until the early 1980s. Uranium-glazed ceramics should only be used as collector's items and not for everyday use due to possible abrasion.

=== ODL measurement network ===
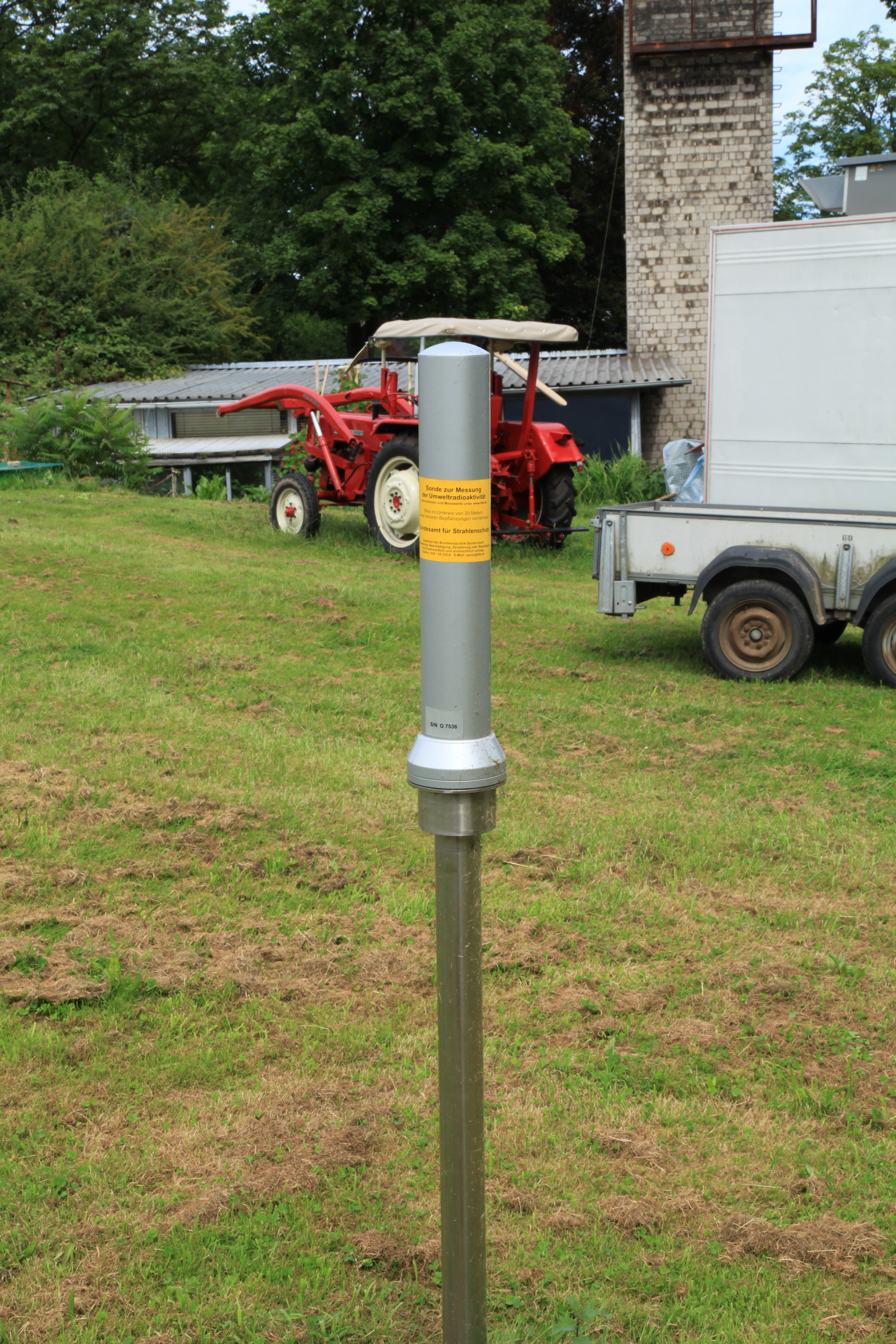
Probe to measure environmental radioactivity

The Federal Office for Radiation Protection's monitoring network measures natural radiation exposure through the local dose rate (ODL), expressed in microsieverts per hour (μSv/h). In Germany, the natural ODL ranges from approximately 0.05 to 0.18 μSv/h, depending on local conditions. The ODL monitoring network has been operational since 1973 and currently comprises 1800 fixed, automatically operating measuring points. Its primary function is to provide early warning for the rapid detection of increased radiation from radioactive substances in the air in Germany. Spectroscopic probes have been successfully utilized since 2008 to determine the contribution of artificial radionuclides in addition to the local dose rate, showcasing the network's advanced capabilities. In addition to the ODL monitoring network of the Federal Office for Radiation Protection, there are other federal monitoring networks at the Federal Maritime and Hydrographic Agency and the Federal Institute of Hydrology, which measure gamma radiation in water; the German Meteorological Service measures air activity with aerosol samplers. To monitor nuclear facilities, the relevant federal states operate their own ODL monitoring networks. The data from these monitoring networks are automatically fed into the Integrated Measurement and Information System (IMIS), where they are used to analyze the current situation.

Many countries operate their own ODL monitoring networks to protect the public. In Europe, these data are collected and published on the EURDEP platform of the European Atomic Energy Community. The European monitoring networks are based on Articles 35 and 37 of the Euratom Treaty.

=== Radionuclides in medicine ===
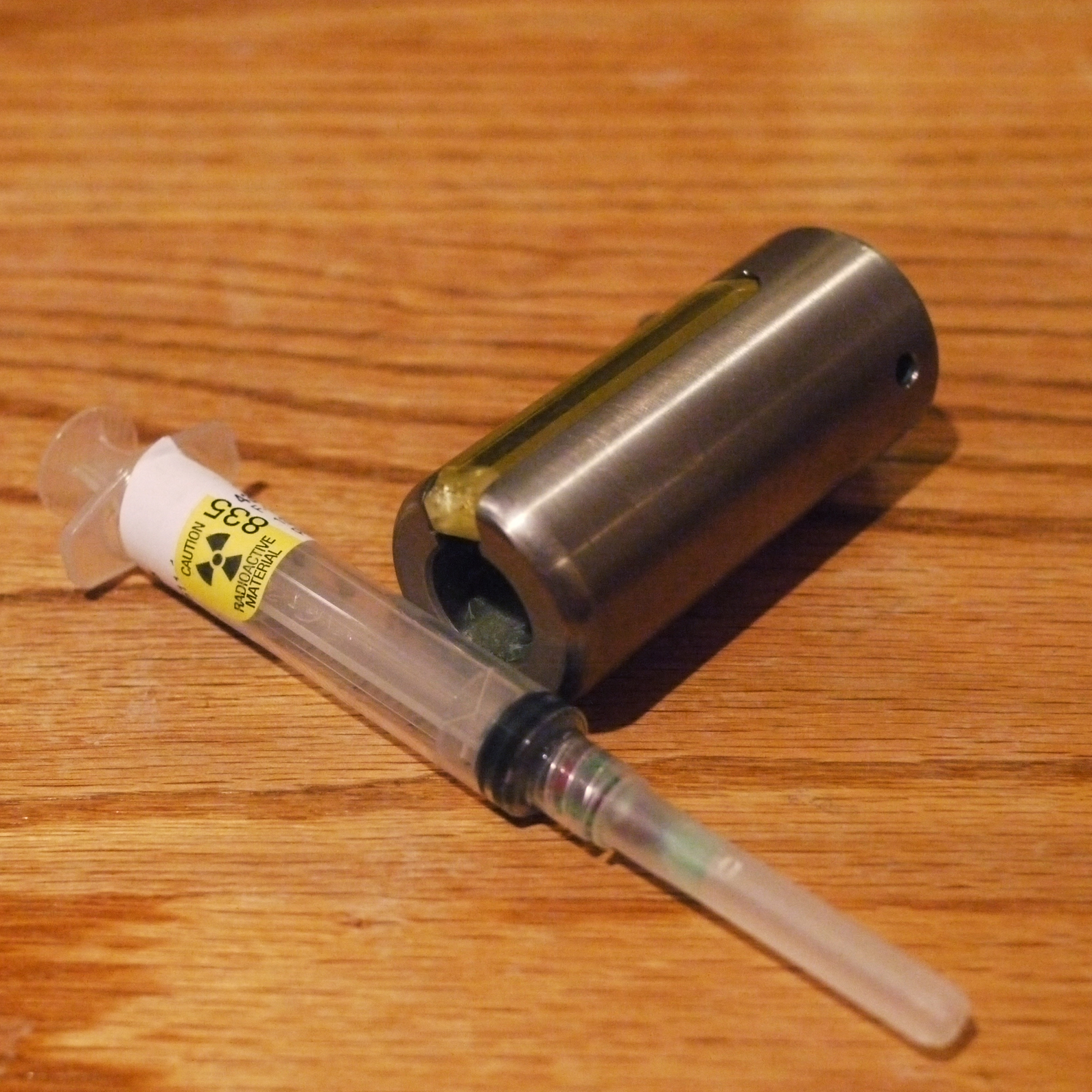
Injection syringe of a radionuclide with associated lead coating

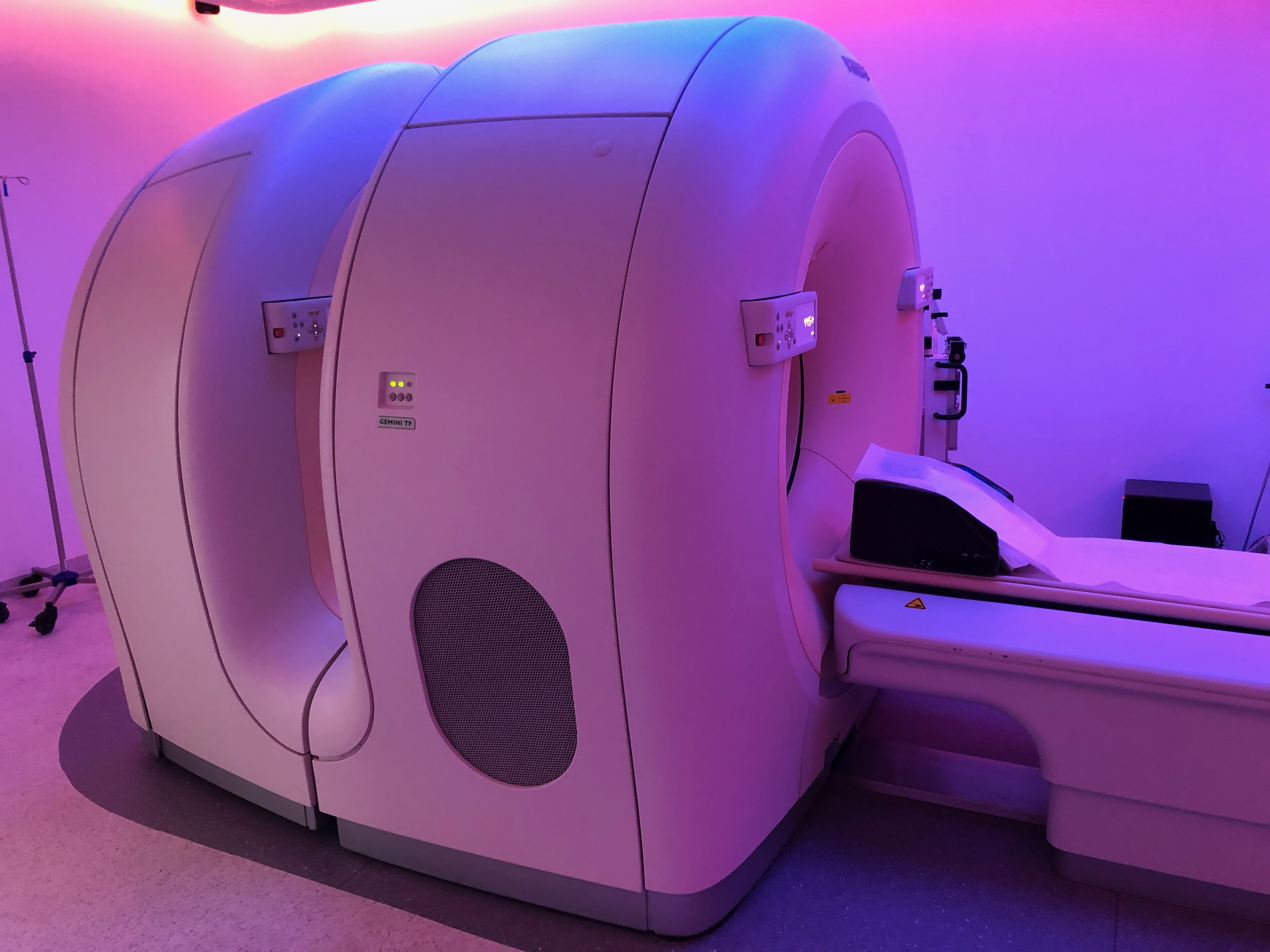
PET-CT, Philips, Gemini TF

Nuclear medicine is the use of open radionuclides for diagnostic and therapeutic purposes (radionuclide therapy). It also includes the use of other radioactive substances and nuclear physics techniques for functional and localization diagnostics. George de Hevesy (1885-1966) lived as a lodger and in 1923 suspected that his landlady was offering him pudding that he had not eaten the following week. He mixed a small amount of a radioactive isotope into the leftovers. When she served him the pudding a week later, he was able to detect radioactivity in a sample of the casserole. When he showed this to his landlady, she immediately gave him notice. The method he used made him the father of nuclear medicine. It became known as the tracer method, which is still used today in nuclear medicine diagnostics. A small amount of a radioactive substance, its distribution in the organism, and its path through the human body can be tracked externally. This provides information about various metabolic functions of the body. The continuous development of radionuclides has improved radiation protection. For example, the mercury compounds ^{203}chloro-merodrin and ^{197}chloro-merodrin were abandoned in the 1960s as substances were developed that allowed a higher photon yield with less radiation exposure. Beta emitters such as ^{131}I and ^{90}Y are used in radionuclide therapy. In nuclear medicine diagnostics, the beta+ emitters ^{18}F, ^{11}C, ^{13}N, and ^{15}O are used as radioactive markers for tracers in positron emission tomography (PET). Radiopharmaceuticals (isotope-labeled drugs) are being developed on an ongoing basis.

Radiopharmaceutical residues, such as empty application syringes and contaminated residues from the patient's toilet, shower and washing water, are collected in tanks and stored until they can be safely pumped into the sewer system. The storage time depends on the half-life and ranges from a few weeks to a few months, depending on the radionuclide. Since 2001, by § 29 StrlSchV (in German) of the Radiation Protection Ordinance, the specific radioactivity in the waste containers has been recorded in release measuring stations and the release time is calculated automatically. This requires measurements of the sample activity in Bq/g and the surface contamination in Bq/cm^{2}. In addition, the behavior of the patients after their discharge from the clinic is prescribed. To protect personnel, syringe filling systems, borehole measurement stations for nuclide-specific measurement of low-activity, small volume individual samples, a lift system into the measurement chamber to reduce radiation exposure when handling highly active samples, probe measurement stations, ILP (isolated limb perfusion) measurement stations to monitor activity with one or more detectors during surgery and report leakage to the surgical oncologist.

==== Radioiodine therapy ====
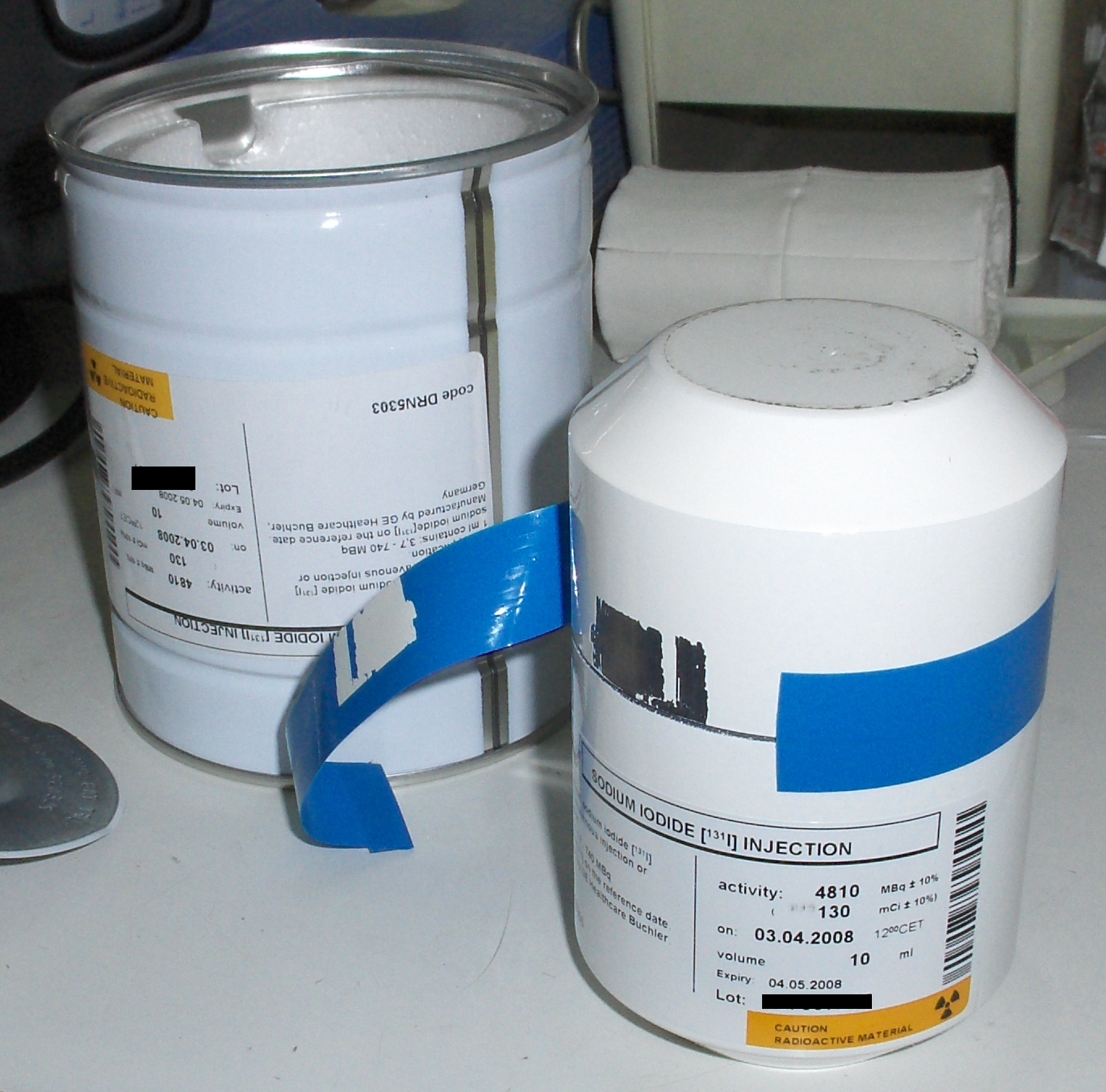
Lead packaging for ^{131}I sodium iodide

Radioiodine Therapy (RIT) is a nuclear medicine procedure used to treat thyroid hyperfunction, Graves' disease, thyroid enlargement, and certain forms of thyroid cancer. The radioactive iodine isotope used is ^{131}Iodine, a predominant beta emitter with a half-life of eight days, which is only stored in thyroid cells in the human body. In 1942, Saul Hertz (1905-1950) of the Massachusetts General Hospital and the physicist Arthur Roberts published their report on the first radioiodine therapy (1941) for Graves' disease, at that time still predominantly using the ^{130}iodine isotope with a half-life of 12.4 hours. At the same time, Joseph Gilbert Hamilton (1907-1957) and John Hundale Lawrence (1904-1991) performed the first therapy with ^{131}iodine, the isotope still used today.

Radioiodine therapy is subject to special legal regulations in many countries, and in Germany may only be performed on an inpatient basis. There are approximately 120 treatment centers in Germany (as of 2014), performing approximately 50,000 treatments per year. In Germany, the minimum length of stay is 48 hours. Discharge depends on the residual activity remaining in the body. In 1999, the limit for residual activity was raised. The dose rate may not exceed 3.5 μSv per hour at a distance of 2 meters from the patient, which means that a radiation exposure of 1 mSv may not be exceeded within one year at a distance of 2 meters. This corresponds to a residual activity of about 250 MBq. Similar regulations exist in Austria.

In Switzerland, a maximum radiation exposure of 1 mSv per year and a maximum of 5 mSv per year for the patient's relatives may not be exceeded. After discharge following radioiodine therapy, a maximum dose rate of 5 μSv per hour at a distance of 1 meter is permitted, which corresponds to a residual activity of approximately 150 MBq. In the event of early discharge, the supervisory authority must be notified up to a dose rate of 17.5 μSv/h; above 17.5 μSv/h, permission must be obtained. If the patient is transferred to another ward, the responsible radiation protection officer must ensure that appropriate radiation protection measures are taken there, e.g. that a temporary control area is set up.

==== Scintigraphy ====
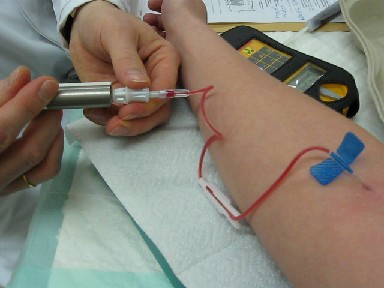
Injection of ^{99m}Tc. To protect the therapist, the injection syringe with the radionuclide is surrounded by a shield.

Scintigraphy is a nuclear medicine procedure in which low-level radioactive substances are injected into the patient for diagnostic purposes. These include bone scintigraphy, thyroid scintigraphy, octreotide scintigraphy, and, as a further development of the procedure, single photon emission computed tomography (SPECT). For example, ^{201}Tl thallium(I) chloride, technetium compounds (^{99m}Tc tracer, ^{99m}technetium tetrofosmin), PET tracers (with radiation exposure of 1100 MBq each with ^{15}O-water, 555 MBq with ^{13}N ammonia, or 1850 MBq with ^{82}Rb rubidium chloride) are used in myocardial scintigraphy to diagnose blood flow conditions and function of the heart muscle (myocardium). The examination with 74 MBq ^{201}Thallium Chloride causes a radiation exposure of about 16 mSv (effective dose equivalent), the examination with 740 MBq ^{99m}Technetium-MIBI about 7 mSv. Metastable ^{99m}Tc is by far the most important nuclide used as a tracer in scintigraphy because of its short half-life, the 140 keV gamma radiation it emits, and its ability to bind to many active biomolecules. Most of this radiation is excreted after the examination. The remaining ^{99m}Tc decays rapidly to ^{99}Tc with a half-life of 6 hours. This has a long half-life of 212,000 years and, because of the relatively weak beta radiation released during its decay, contributes only a small amount of additional radiation exposure over the remaining lifetime. In the United States alone, approximately seven million individual doses of ^{99m}Tc are administered each year for diagnostic purposes.

To reduce radiation exposure, the American Society of Nuclear Cardiology (ASNC) issued dosage recommendations in 2010. The effective dose is 2.4 mSv for ^{13}N-ammonia, 2.5 mSv for ^{15}O-water, 7 mSv for ^{18}F-fluorodeoxyglucose, and 13.5 mSv for ^{82}Rb-rubidium chloride. Compliance with these recommendations is expected to reduce the average radiation exposure to = 9 mSv. The Ordinance on Radioactive Drugs or Drugs Treated with Ionizing Radiation § 2 AMRadV (in German) regulates the approval procedures for the marketability of radioactive drugs.

==== Brachytherapy ====
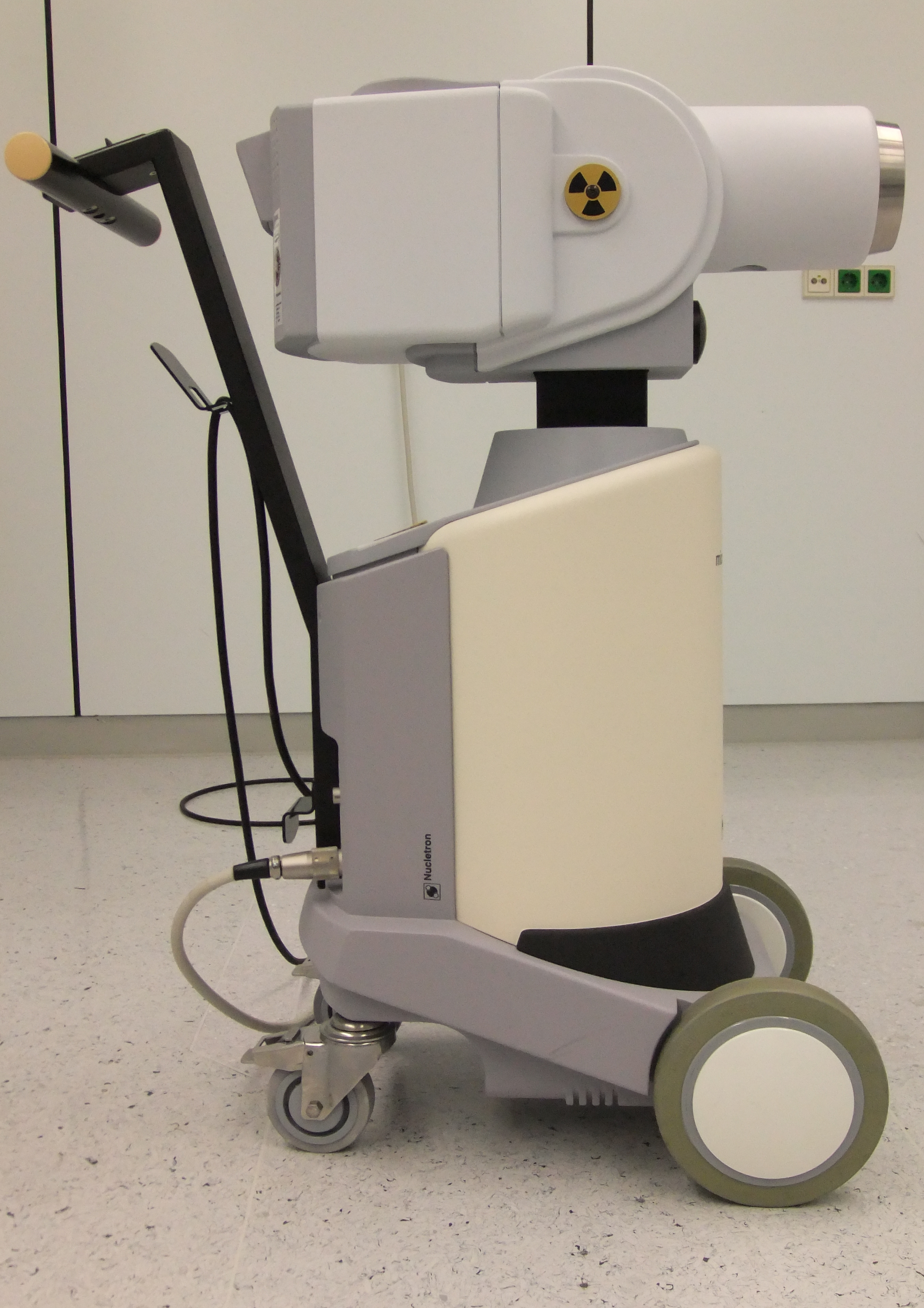
Afterloading device

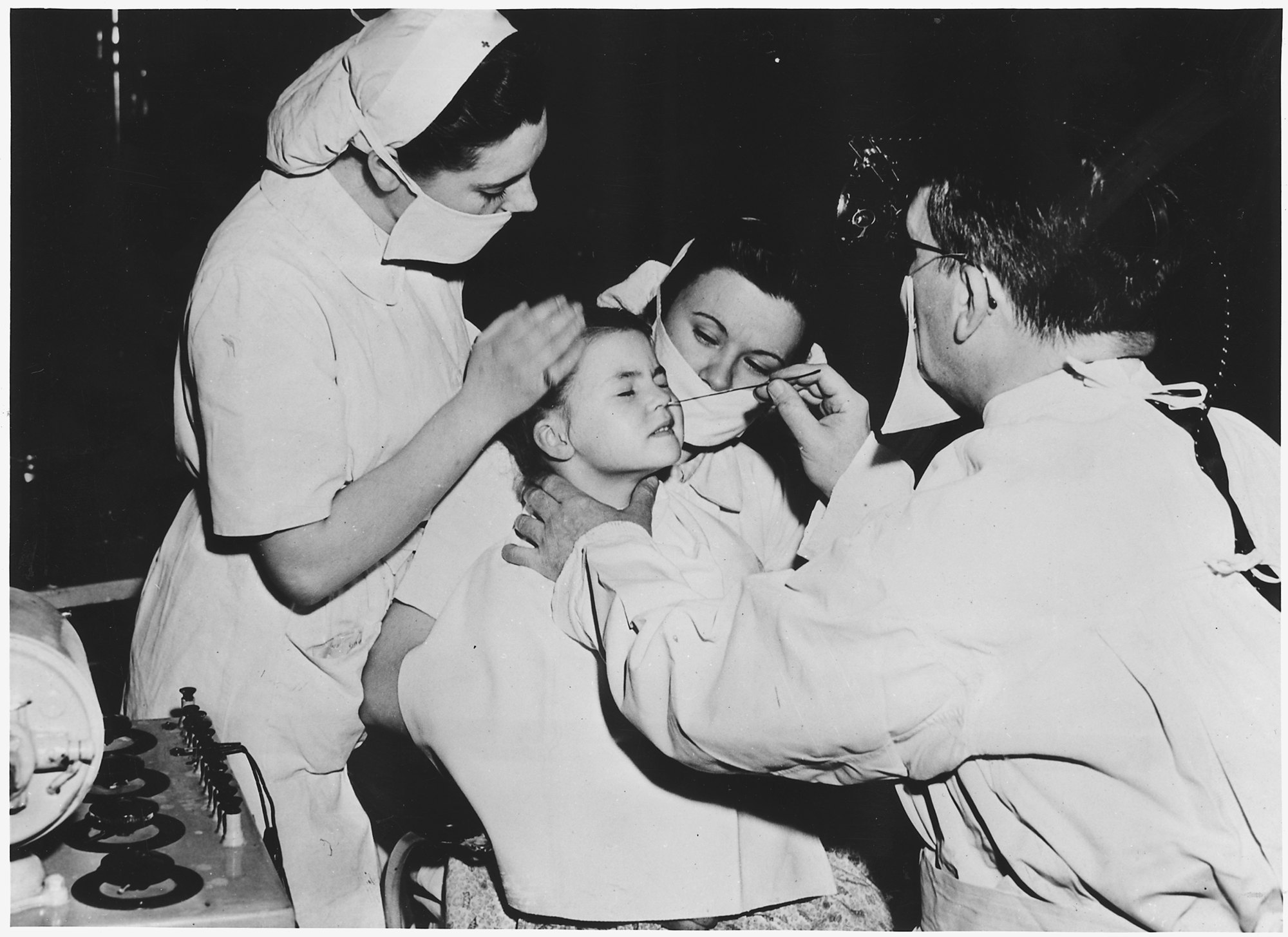
Brachytherapy with radium for the treatment of nasal mucosal inflammation in a young girl, Paris, ca. 1948-1955

Brachytherapy is used to place a sealed radioactive source inside or near the body to treat cancer, such as prostate cancer. Afterloading brachytherapy is often combined with teletherapy, which is external radiation delivered from a greater distance than brachytherapy. It is not classified as a nuclear medicine procedure, although like nuclear medicine, it uses the radiation emitted by radionuclides. After initial interest in brachytherapy in the early 20th century, its use declined in the mid-20th century because of the radiation exposure to physicians from manual handling of the radiation sources. It was not until the development of remote-controlled afterloading systems and the use of new radiation sources in the 1950s and 1960s that the risk of unnecessary radiation exposure to physicians and patients was reduced. In the afterloading procedure, an empty, tubular applicator is inserted into the target volume (e.g., the uterus) before the actual therapy and, after checking the position, loaded with a radioactive preparation. The preparation is located at the tip of a steel wire that is advanced and retracted step by step under computer control. After the pre-calculated time, the source is withdrawn into a safe and the applicator is removed. The procedure is used for breast cancer, bronchial carcinoma or oral floor carcinoma, among others. Beta emitters such as ^{90}Sr or ^{106}Ru or ^{192}Ir are used. As a precaution, patients undergoing permanent brachytherapy are advised not to hold small children immediately after treatment and not to be in the vicinity of pregnant women, since low-dose radioactive sources (seeds) remain in the body after treatment with permanent brachytherapy. This is to protect the particularly radiation-sensitive tissues of a fetus or infant.

==== Thorium as a drug and X-ray contrast agent ====
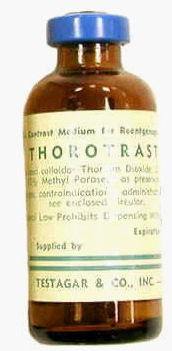
Thorotrast

Radioactive thorium was used in the 1950s and 60s to treat tuberculosis and other benign diseases (including children), with serious consequences (see Peteosthor). A stabilized suspension of colloidal thorium(IV) oxide, co-developed by António Egas Moniz (1874-1954), was used from 1929 under the trade name Thorotrast as an X-ray contrast agent for angiography in several million patients worldwide until it was banned in the mid-1950s. It accumulates in the reticulohistiocytic system and can lead to cancer due to locally increased radiation exposure. The same is true for cholangiocarcinoma and angiosarcoma of the liver, two rare liver cancers. Carcinomas of the paranasal sinuses have also been described following administration of Thorotrast. Typical onset of disease is 30–35 years after exposure. The biological half-life of Thorotrast is approximately 400 years. The largest study in this area was conducted in Germany in 2004 and showed a particularly high mortality rate among patients exposed in this way. The median life expectancy over a seventy-year observation period was 14 years shorter than in the comparison group.

== Nuclear weapons and nuclear energy ==
=== Radiation effects of the atomic bomb attack and consequences for radiation protection ===
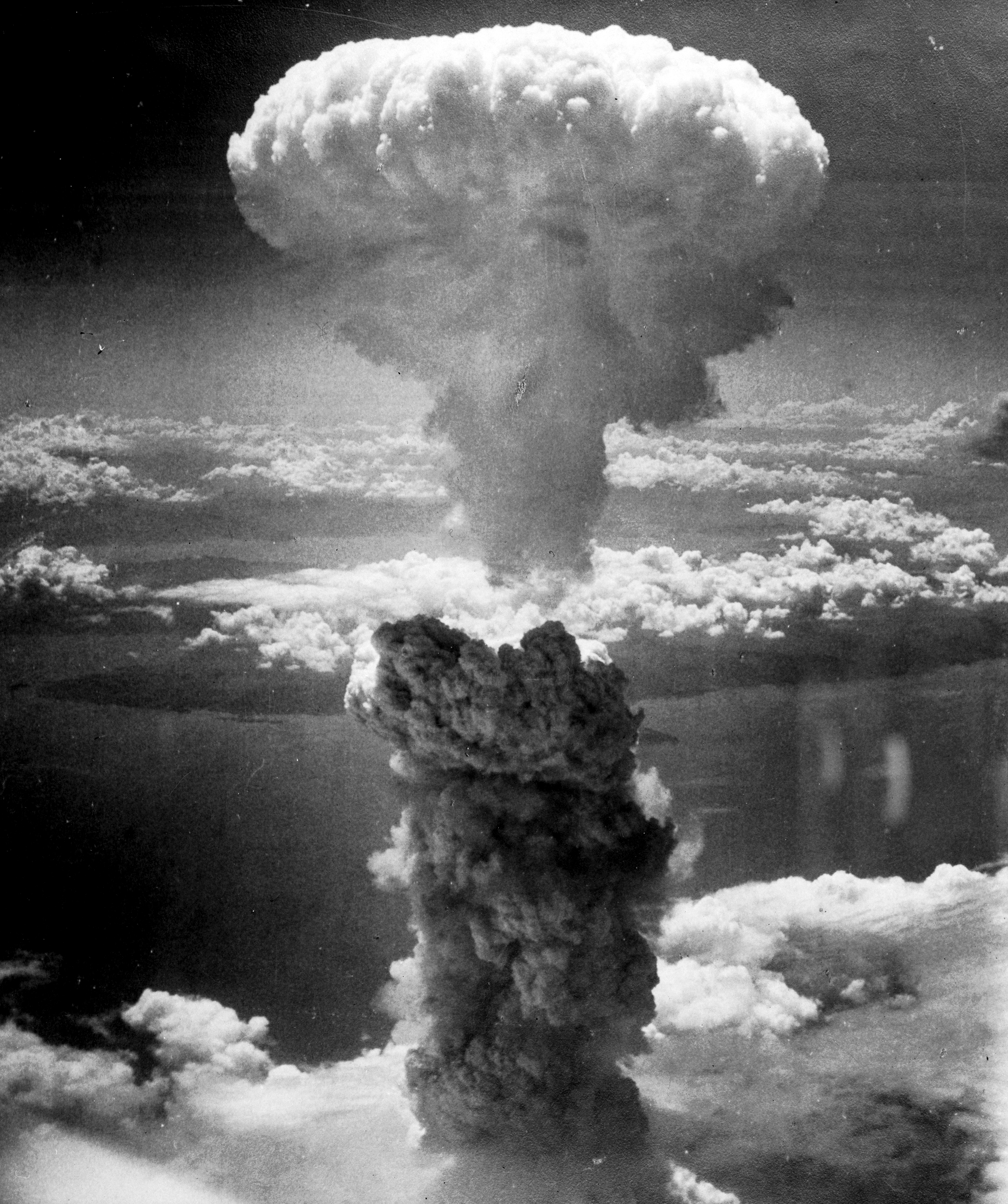
Mushroom cloud from "Fat Man" over Nagasaki, August 9, 1945

After the U.S. atomic bombs were dropped on Hiroshima and Nagasaki on August 6 and 9, 1945, an additional 130,000 people - in addition to the 100,000 immediate victims - died from the effects of radiation by the end of 1945. Some experienced the so-called walking ghost phase, an acute radiation sickness caused by a high equivalent dose of 6 to 20 Sievert after a lethal whole-body dose. The phase describes the period of apparent recovery of a patient between the onset of the first massive symptoms and the inevitable death. In the years that followed, a number of deaths from radiation-induced diseases were added. In Japan, the radiation-damaged survivors are called hibakusha (Japanese: 被爆者, lit. ''Explosion victim'') and are conservatively estimated to number about 100,000.

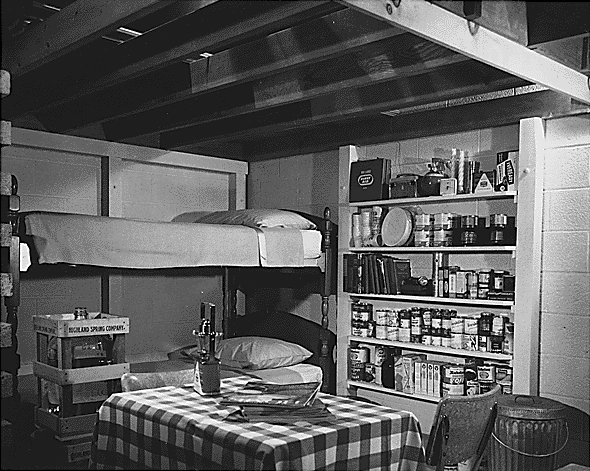
A US shelter from radioactive fallout during the Cold War, 1957

In 1946, the Atomic Bomb Casualty Commission (ABCC) was established by the National Research Council of the National Academy of Sciences by order of U.S. President Harry S. Truman to study the long-term effects of radiation on survivors of the atomic bombings. In 1975, the ABCC was replaced by the Radiation Effects Research Foundation (RERF). Organizations such as the United Nations Scientific Committee on the Effects of Atomic Radiation (UNSCEAR), founded in 1955, and the National Academy of Sciences - Advisory Committee on the Biological Effects of Ionizing Radiation (BEIR Committee), founded in 1972, analyze the effects of radiation exposure on humans on the basis of atomic bomb victims who have been examined and, in some cases, medically monitored for decades. They determine the course of the mortality rate as a function of the age of the radiation victims in comparison with the spontaneous rate, and also the dose-dependency of the number of additional deaths. To date, 26 UNSCEAR reports have been published and are available online, most recently in 2017 on the effects of the Fukushima nuclear accident.

By 1949, Americans felt increasingly threatened by the possibility of nuclear war with the Soviet Union and sought ways to survive a nuclear attack. The U.S. Federal Civil Defense Administration (USFCDA) was created by the government to educate the public on how to prepare for such an attack. In 1951, with the help of this agency, a children's educational film was produced in the U.S. called Duck and Cover, in which a turtle demonstrates how to protect oneself from the immediate effects of an atomic bomb explosion by using a coat, tablecloths, or even a newspaper.

Recognizing that existing medical capacity would not be sufficient in an emergency, dentists were called upon to either assist physicians in an emergency or, if necessary, to provide assistance themselves. To mobilize the profession with the help of a prominent representative, dentist Russell Welford Bunting (1881-1962), dean of the University of Michigan Dental School, was recruited in July 1951 as a dental consultant to the USFCDA.

The American physicist Karl Ziegler Morgan (1907-1999) was one of the founders of radiation health physics. In later life, after a long career with the Manhattan Project and Oak Ridge National Laboratory (ORNL), he became a critic of nuclear power and nuclear weapons production. Morgan was Director of Health Physics at ORNL from the late 1940s until his retirement in 1972. In 1955, he became the first president of the Health Physics Society and served as editor of the journal Health Physics from 1955 to 1977.

Nuclear fallout shelters are designed to protect for an extended period. Due to the nature of nuclear warfare, such shelters must be completely self-sufficient for long periods. In particular, because of the radioactive contamination of the surrounding area, such a facility must be able to survive for several weeks. In 1959, top-secret construction began in Germany on a government bunker in the Ahr valley. In June 1964, 144 test persons survived for six days in a civilian nuclear bunker. The bunker in Dortmund had been built during the Second World War and had been converted at great expense in the early 1960s into a nuclear-weapon-proof building. However, it would be impossible to build a bunker for millions of German citizens. The Swiss Army built about 7800 nuclear fallout shelters in 1964. In the United States in particular, but also Europe, citizens built private fallout shelters in their front yards on their initiative. This construction was largely kept secret because the owners feared that third parties might take possession of the bunker in the event of a crisis.

=== Fallout and contamination ===
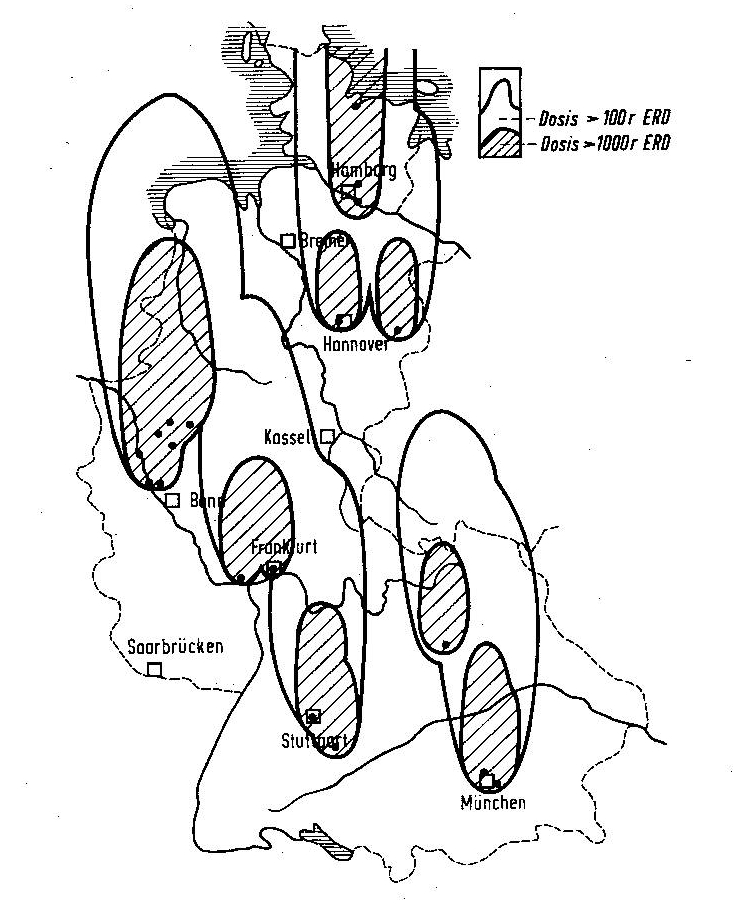
Calculation of casualties from 20 targeted nuclear bombs dropped on the Federal Republic of Germany during the Cold War in 1966 with at least 15 million fatalities (shaded areas)

On July 16, 1945, the first atomic bomb test took place near the town of Alamogordo (New Mexico, USA). As a result of the atmospheric nuclear weapons tests carried out by the United States, the Soviet Union, France, Great Britain, and China, the Earth's atmosphere became increasingly contaminated with fission products from these tests from the 1950s onwards. The radioactive fallout landed on the earth's surface and ended up in plants and, via animal feed, in food of animal origin. Ultimately, they entered the human body and could be detected in bones and teeth as strontium-90, among other things. The radioactivity in the field was measured with a gamma scope, as shown at the air raid equipment exhibition in Bad Godesberg in 1954. Around 180 tests were carried out in 1962 alone. The extent of the radioactive contamination of the food sparked worldwide protests in the early 1960s.

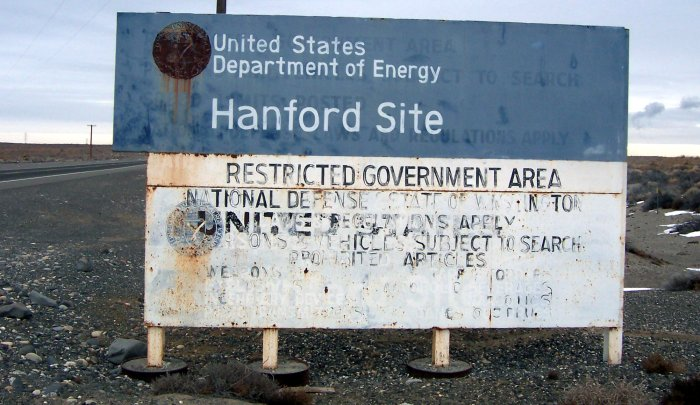
Warning sign in front of the Hanford Site

During World War II and the Cold War, the Hanford Site produced plutonium for U.S. nuclear weapons for more than 50 years. The plutonium for the first plutonium bomb, Fat Man, also came from there. Hanford is considered the most radioactively contaminated site in the Western Hemisphere. A total of 110,000 tons of nuclear fuel was produced there. In 1948, a radioactive cloud leaked from the plant. The amount of ^{131}I alone was 5500 curies. Most of the reactors at Hanford were shut down in the 1960s, but no disposal or decontamination was done. After preliminary work, the world's largest decontamination operation began at Hanford in 2001 to safely dispose of the radioactive and toxic waste. In 2006, some 11,000 workers were still cleaning up contaminated buildings and soil to reduce radiation levels at the site to acceptable levels. This work is expected to continue until 2052. It is estimated that more than four million liters of radioactive liquid have leaked from storage tanks.

It was only after the two superpowers agreed on a Partial Test Ban Treaty in 1963, which allowed only underground nuclear weapons testing, that the level of radioactivity in food began to decline. Shields Warren (1896-1980), one of the authors of a report on the effects of the atomic bombs dropped on Japan, was criticized for downplaying the effects of residual radiation in Hiroshima and Nagasaki, but later warned of the dangers of fallout. Fallout refers to the spread of radioactivity in the context of a given meteorological situation. A model experiment was conducted in 2008.

The International Campaign to Abolish Nuclear Weapons (ICAN) is an international alliance of non-governmental organizations committed to the elimination of all nuclear weapons through a binding international treaty - a Nuclear Weapons Convention. ICAN was founded in 2007 by IPPNW (International Physicians for the Prevention of Nuclear War) and other organizations at the Nuclear Non-Proliferation Treaty Conference in Vienna and launched in twelve countries. Today, 468 organizations in 101 countries are involved in the campaign (as of 2017). ICAN was awarded the 2017 Nobel Peace Prize.

=== Radioprotectors ===
A radioprotector is a pharmacon that, when administered, selectively protects healthy cells from the toxic effects of ionizing radiation. The first work with radioprotectors began as part of the Manhattan Project, a military research project to develop and build an atomic bomb.

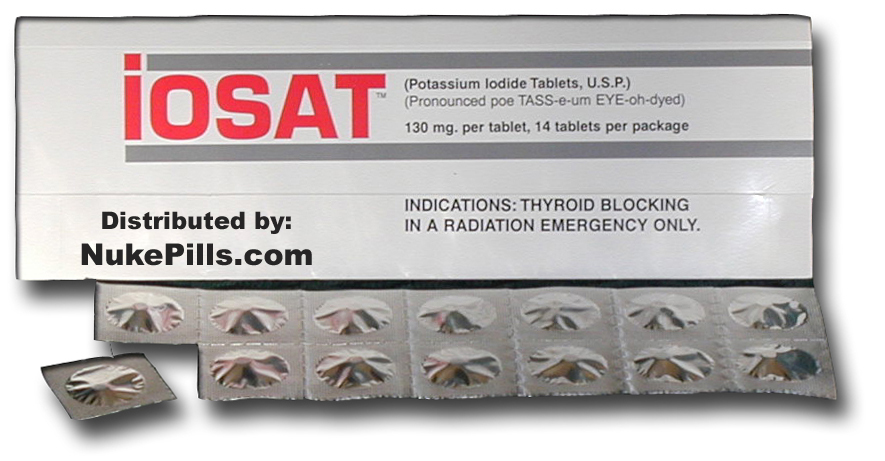
Potassium iodide in a dose for nuclear emergencies

Iodine absorbed by the body is almost completely stored in the thyroid gland and has a biological half-life of about 120 days. If the iodine is radioactive (^{131}I), it can irradiate and damage the thyroid gland in high doses during this time. Because the thyroid gland can only absorb a limited amount of iodine, prophylactic administration of non-radioactive iodine may result in iodine blockade. Potassium iodide in tablet form (colloquially known as "iodine tablets") reduces the uptake of radioactive iodine into the thyroid by a factor of 90 or more, thus acting as a radioprotector. All other radiation damage remains unaffected by taking iodine tablets. In Germany, the Potassium Iodide Ordinance (KIV) was enacted in 2003 to ensure "the supply of the population with potassium iodide-containing medicines in the event of radiological incidents". § 1 kiv (in German) Potassium iodide is usually stored in communities near nuclear facilities for distribution to the population in the event of a disaster. People over the age of 45 should not take iodine tablets because the risk of side effects is higher than the risk of developing thyroid cancer. In Switzerland, as a precautionary measure, tablets have been distributed every five years since 2004 to the population living within 20 km of nuclear power plants (from 2014, 50 km). In Austria, large stocks of iodine tablets have been kept in pharmacies, kindergartens, schools, the army and the federal reserve since 2002.

Thanks to the protective function of radioprotectors, the dose of radiation used to treat malignant tumors (cancer) can be increased, thereby increasing the effectiveness of the therapy. There are also radiosensitizers, which increase the sensitivity of malignant tumor cells to ionizing radiation. As early as 1921, the German radiologist Hermann Holthusen (1886-1971) described that oxygen increases the sensitivity of cells.

=== Nuclear accidents and catastrophes ===
Founded in 1957 as a sub-organization of the Organization for Economic Cooperation and Development (OECD), the Nuclear Energy Agency (NEA) pools the scientific and financial resources of participating countries' nuclear research programs. It operates various databases and also manages the International Reporting System for Operating Experience (IRS or IAEA/NEA Incident Reporting System) of the International Atomic Energy Agency (IAEA). The IAEA records and investigates radiation accidents that have occurred worldwide in connection with nuclear medical procedures and the disposal of related materials.

The International Nuclear and Radiological Event Scale (INES) is a scale for safety-related events, in particular nuclear incidents and accidents in nuclear facilities. It was developed by an international group of experts and officially adopted in 1990 by the International Atomic Energy Agency (IAEA) and the Nuclear Energy Agency of the Organization for Economic Cooperation and Development (OECD). The purpose of the scale is to inform the public quickly about the safety significance of an event by means of a comprehensible classification of events.

At the end of its useful life, the proper disposal of the remaining high activity is of paramount importance. Improper disposal of the radionuclide cobalt-60, used in cobalt guns for radiotherapy, has led to serious radiation accidents, such as the Ciudad Juárez (Mexico) radiological accident in 1983/84, the Goiânia (Brazil) accident in 1987, the Samut Prakan (Thailand) nuclear accident in 2000, and the Mayapuri (India) accident in 2010.

Eleven Therac-25 linear accelerators were built by the Canadian company Atomic Energy of Canada Limited (AECL) between 1982 and 1985 and installed in clinics in the United States and Canada. Software errors and a lack of quality assurance led to a serious malfunction that killed three patients and seriously injured three others between June 1985 and 1987 before appropriate countermeasures were taken. The radiation exposure in the six cases was subsequently estimated to be between 40 and 200 Gray; normal treatment is equivalent to a dose of less than 2 Gray.

Around 1990, about one hundred cobalt guns were still in use in Germany. In the meantime, electron linear accelerators were introduced and the last cobalt gun was decommissioned in 2000.

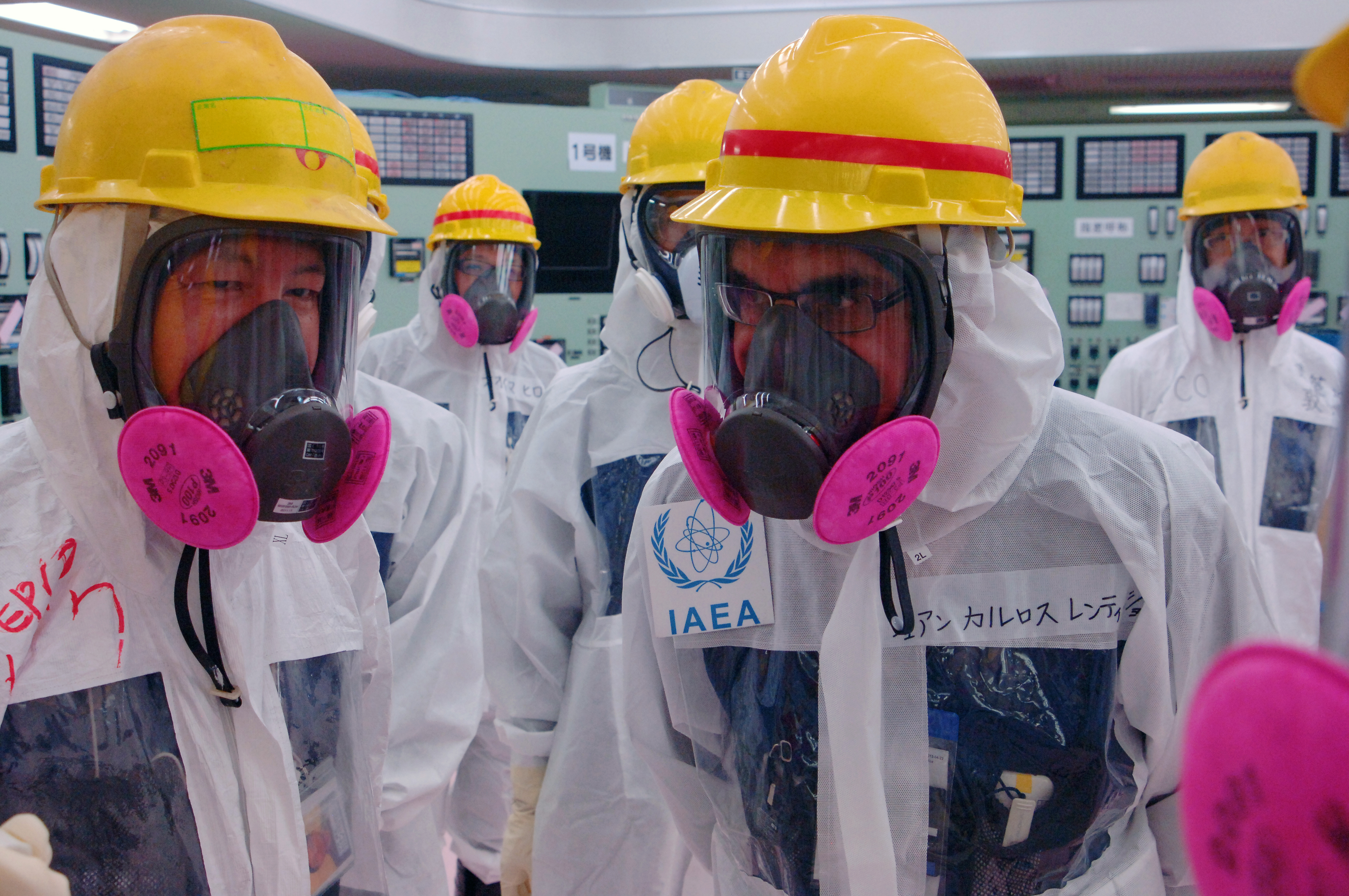
Experts from the International Atomic Energy Agency in Fukushima, 2013

The Fukushima nuclear accident in 2011 reinforced the need for proper safety management and the derivation of safety indicators regarding the frequency of errors and incorrect actions by personnel, i.e., the human factor. The Nuclear Safety Commission of Japan (Japanese: 原子力安全委員会) was a body of scientists that advised the Japanese government on nuclear safety issues. The commission was established in 1978, but was dissolved after the Fukushima nuclear disaster on September 19, 2012, and replaced by the Genshiryoku Kisei Iinkai (Japanese: 原子力規制委員会, lit. 'Nuclear Regulatory Committee'). It is an independent agency (gaikyoku, "external office") of the Japanese Ministry of the Environment that regulates and monitors the safety of Japan's nuclear power plants and related facilities.

As a result of the Chernobyl nuclear disaster in 1986, the IAEA coined the term "safety culture" for the first time in 1991 to draw attention to the importance of human and organizational issues for the safe operation of nuclear power plants.

After this nuclear disaster, the sand in children's playgrounds in Germany was removed and replaced with uncontaminated sand to protect children who were most vulnerable to radioactivity. Some families temporarily left Germany to escape the fallout. Infant mortality increased significantly by 5% in 1987, the year after Chernobyl. In total, 316 more newborns died that year than statistically expected. In Germany, the caesium^{137} inventories from the Chernobyl nuclear disaster in soil and food decrease by 2-3% each year; however, the contamination of game and mushrooms was still comparatively high in 2015, especially in Bavaria; there are several cases of game meat, especially wild boar, exceeding the limits. However, controls are insufficient.

"In particular, wild boars in southern Bavaria are repeatedly found to have a very high radioactive contamination of over 10,000 Becquerel/kg. The limit is 600 Becquerel/kg. For this reason, the Bavarian Consumer Center advises against eating wild boar from the Bavarian Forest and south of the Danube too often. Whoever buys wild boar from a hunter, should ask for the measurement protocol."

— Bavarian Consumer Center (ed.), Consumption recommendation of the Bavarian Consumer Advice Center', as of 16/12/2014.

=== Ocean dumping of radioactive waste ===
Between 1969 and 1982, conditioned low- and intermediate-level radioactive waste was disposed of in the Atlantic Ocean at a depth of about 4,000 meters under the supervision of the Nuclear Energy Agency (NEA) of the Organization for Economic Cooperation and Development (OECD) in accordance with the provisions of the European Convention on the Prevention of Marine Pollution by Dumping of Waste of All Kinds (London Dumping Convention of June 11, 1974). This was carried out jointly by several European countries. Since 1993, international treaties have prohibited the dumping of radioactive waste in the oceans. For decades, this dumping of nuclear waste went largely unnoticed by the public until Greenpeace denounced it in the 1980s.

=== Repository for heat-generating radioactive waste ===
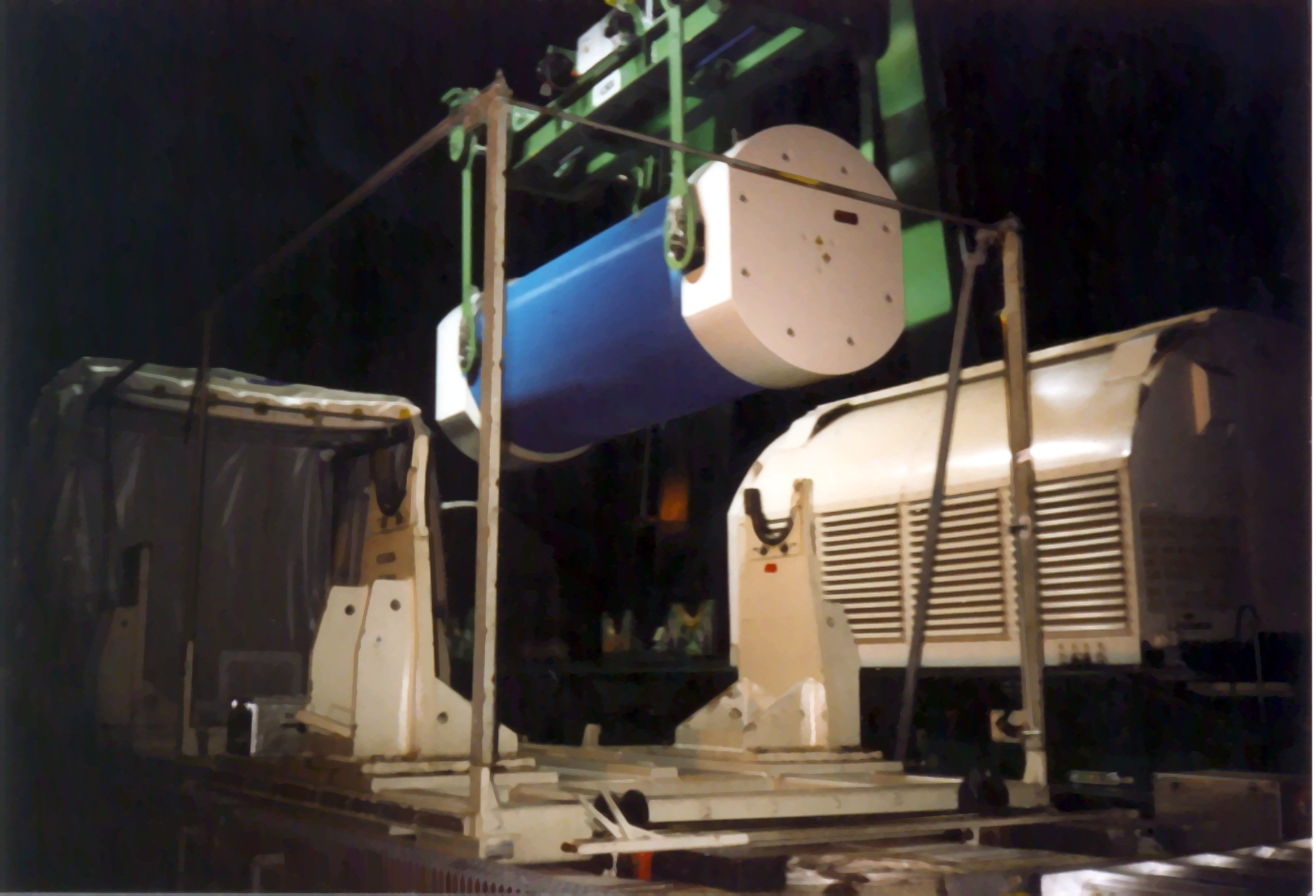
Loading of a Castor container in Dannenberg in March 2001; 10th Castor transport to Gorleben/Wendland

Since the commissioning of the first commercial nuclear power plants (USA 1956, Germany 1962), various final storage concepts for radioactive materials have been proposed in the following decades, of which only storage in deep geological formations appeared to be safe and feasible within a reasonable period of time and was pursued further. Due to the high activity of the short-lived fission products, spent fuel is initially handled only under water and stored for several years in a decay pool. The water is used for cooling and also shields much of the emitted radiation. This is followed either by reprocessing or by decades of interim storage. Waste from reprocessing must also be stored temporarily until the heat has decreased enough to allow final disposal. Casks are special containers for the storage and transport of highly radioactive materials. Their maximum permissible dose rate is 0.35 mSv/h, of which a maximum of 0.25 mSv/h is due to neutron radiation. The safety of these transport containers has been discussed every three years since 1980 at the International Symposium on the Packaging and Transportation of Radioactive Materials (PATRAM).

Following various experiments, such as the Gorleben exploratory mine or the Asse mine, a working group on the selection procedure for repository sites (AkEnd) developed recommendations for a new selection procedure for repository sites between 1999 and 2002. In Germany, the Site Selection Act was passed in 2013 and the Act on the Further Development of the Site Search was passed on March 23, 2017. A suitable site is to be sought throughout Germany and identified by 2031. In principle, crystalline (granite), salt or clay rock types can be considered for a repository. There will be no "ideal" site. The "best possible" site will be sought. Mining areas and regions where volcanoes have been active or where there is a risk of earthquakes are excluded. Internationally, experts are advocating storage in rock formations several hundred meters below the earth's surface. This involves building a repository mine and storing the waste there. It is then permanently sealed. Geological and technical barriers surrounding the waste are designed to keep it safe for thousands of years. For example, 300 meters of rock will separate the repository from the earth's surface. It will be surrounded by a 100-meter-thick layer of granite, salt or clay. The first waste is not expected to be stored until 2050.

The Federal Office for the Safety of Nuclear Waste Management (BfE) took up its activities on September 1, 2004. Its remit includes tasks relating to nuclear safety, the safety of nuclear waste management, the site selection procedure including research activities in these areas and, later on, further tasks in the area of licensing and supervision of repositories.

In the USA, Yucca Mountain was initially selected as the final storage site, but this project was temporarily halted in February 2009. Yucca Mountain was the starting point for an investigation into atomic semiotics.

=== Atomic semiotics ===
Attempt at a more comprehensible warning against radioactive radiation (ISO 21482, since 2007)

The operation of nuclear power plants and other nuclear facilities produces radioactive materials that can have lethal health effects for thousands of years. There is no institution capable of maintaining the necessary knowledge of the dangers over such periods, and of ensuring that warnings about the dangers of nuclear waste in nuclear repositories will be understood by posterity in the distant future. A few years ago, even the capsules of the radionuclide cobalt-60, which were appropriately labeled, went unnoticed. Improper disposal led to the opening of these capsules, resulting in fatal consequences. The dimensions of time exceed previous human standards. For instance, cuneiform writing, which is only about 5000 years old (about 150 human generations), can only be understood after a long period of research and by experts. In 1981, research into the development of atomic semiotics began in the USA, in the German-speaking world, Roland Posner (1942-2020) of the Center for Semiotics at Technische Universität Berlin worked on this in 1982/83. In the USA, the time horizon for such warning signs was set at 10,000 years; later, as in Germany, it was set at a period of one million years, which would correspond to about 30,000 (human) generations. To date, no satisfactory solution to this problem has been found.

== Radiation protection during flights ==
=== High-altitude radiation ===
In 1912, Victor Franz Hess (1883-1964) discovered (secondary) cosmic rays in the Earth's atmosphere using balloon flights. For this discovery he received the Nobel Prize in Physics in 1936. He was also one of the "martyrs" of early radiation research and had to undergo a thumb amputation and larynx surgery due to radium burns. In the United States and the Soviet Union, balloon flights to altitudes of about 30 km, followed by parachute jumps from the stratosphere, were conducted before 1960 to study human exposure to cosmic radiation in space. The American Manhigh and Excelsior projects with Joseph Kittinger (1928-2022) became particularly well known, but the Soviet parachutist Yevgeny Andreyev (1926-2000) also set new records.

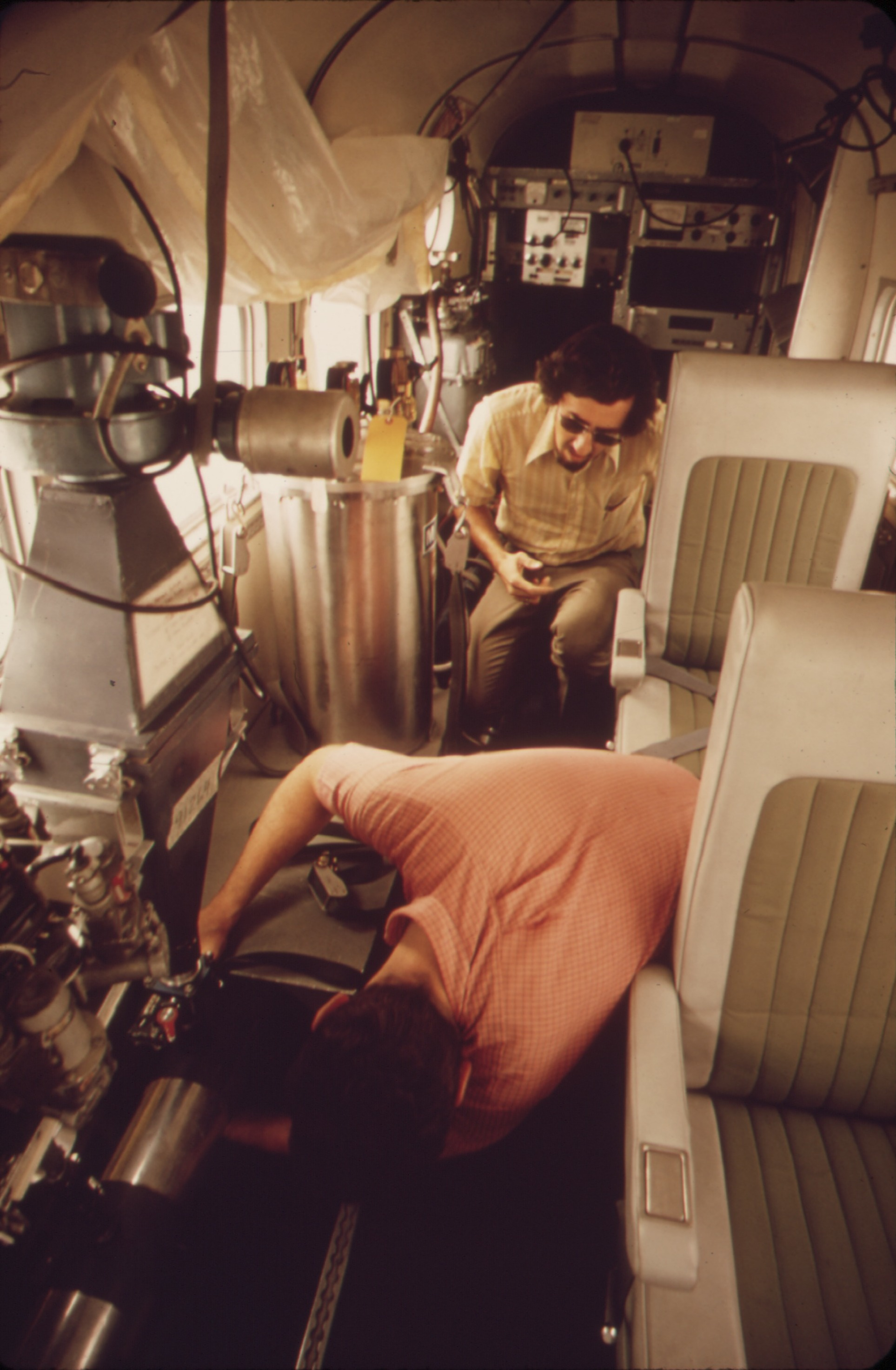
Measurement of cosmic radiation in an aircraft of the Environmental Protection Agency (EPA) founded in 1970, Las Vegas National Research Center, a US agency for the protection of the environment, 1972

High-energy radiation from space is much stronger at high altitudes than at sea level. The radiation exposure of flight crews and air travelers is therefore increased. The International Commission on Radiological Protection (ICRP) has issued recommendations for dose limits, which were incorporated into European law in 1996 and into the German Radiation Protection Ordinance in 2001. Radiation exposure is particularly high when flying in the polar regions or over the polar route. The average annual effective dose for aviation personnel was 1.9 mSv in 2015 and 2.0 mSv in 2016. The highest annual personal dose was 5.7 mSv in 2015 and 6.0 mSv in 2016. The collective dose for 2015 was about 76 person-Sv. This means that flight personnel are among the occupational groups in Germany with the highest radiation exposure in terms of collective dose and average annual dose. This group also includes frequent flyers, with Thomas Stuker holding the "record" - also in terms of radiation exposure - by reaching the 10 million mile mark with United Airlines MileagePlus on 5,900 flights between 1982 and the summer of 2011. In 2017, he passed the 18 million mile mark.

The program EPCARD (European Program Package for the Calculation of Aviation Route Dose) was developed at the University of Siegen and the Helmholtz Munich and can be used to calculate the dose from all components of natural penetrating cosmic radiation on any flight route and flight profile - also online.

=== Radiation protection in space ===
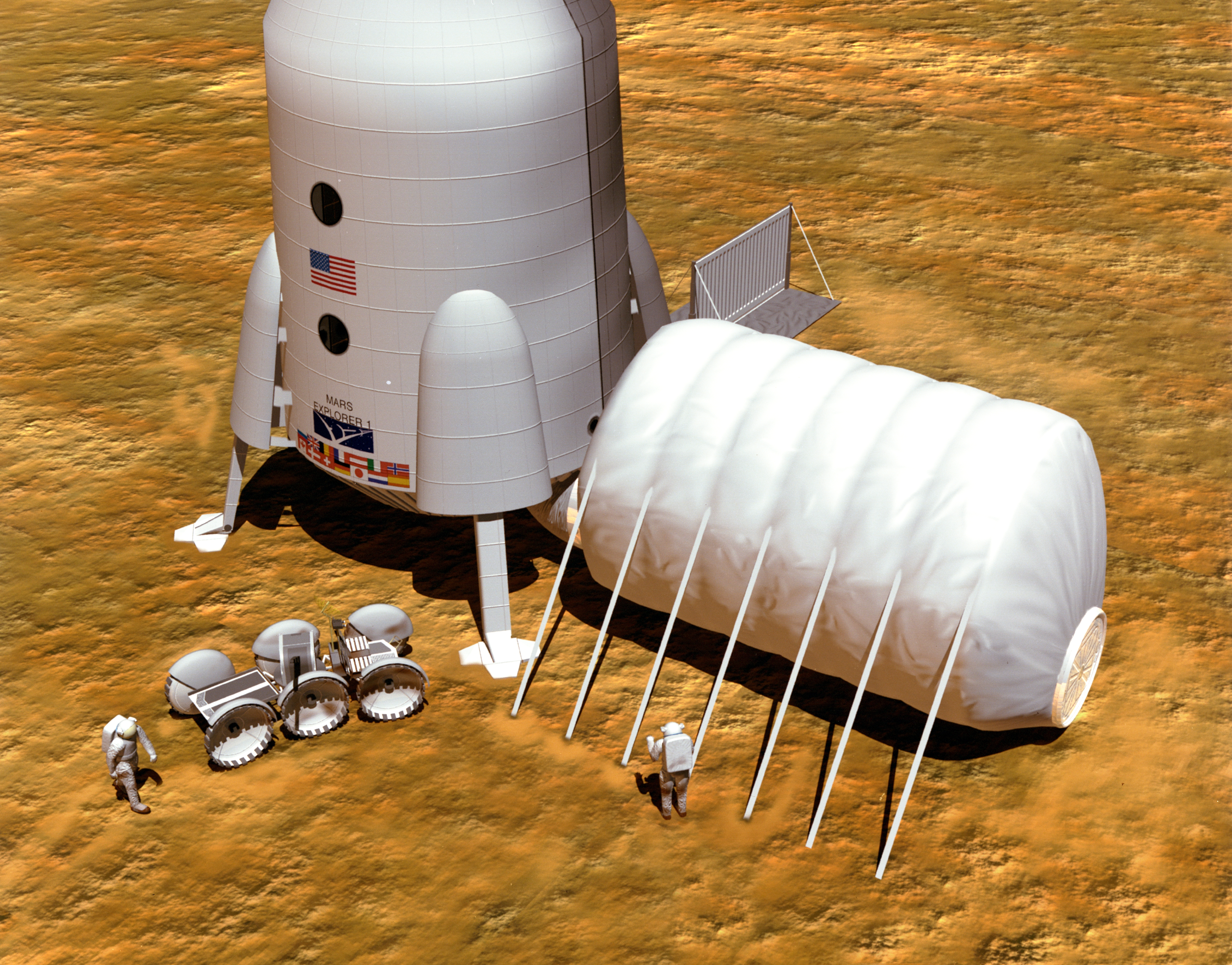
NASA design for a space station on Mars to protect against radioactive radiation during Mars colonization. The materials needed for construction would be available on Mars.

From the earliest crewed space flights to the first moon landing and the construction of the International Space Station (ISS), radiation protection has been a major concern. Spacesuits used for extravehicular activities are coated on the outside with aluminum, which largely protects against cosmic radiation. The largest international research project to determine the effective dose or effective dose equivalent was the Matryoshka experiment in 2010, named after the Russian Matryoshka dolls, because it uses a human-sized phantom that can be cut into slices. As part of Matroshka, an anthropomorphic phantom was exposed to the outside of the space station for the first time to simulate an astronaut performing an extravehicular activity (spacewalk) and determine their exposure to radiation.Microelectronics on satellites must also be protected from radiation.

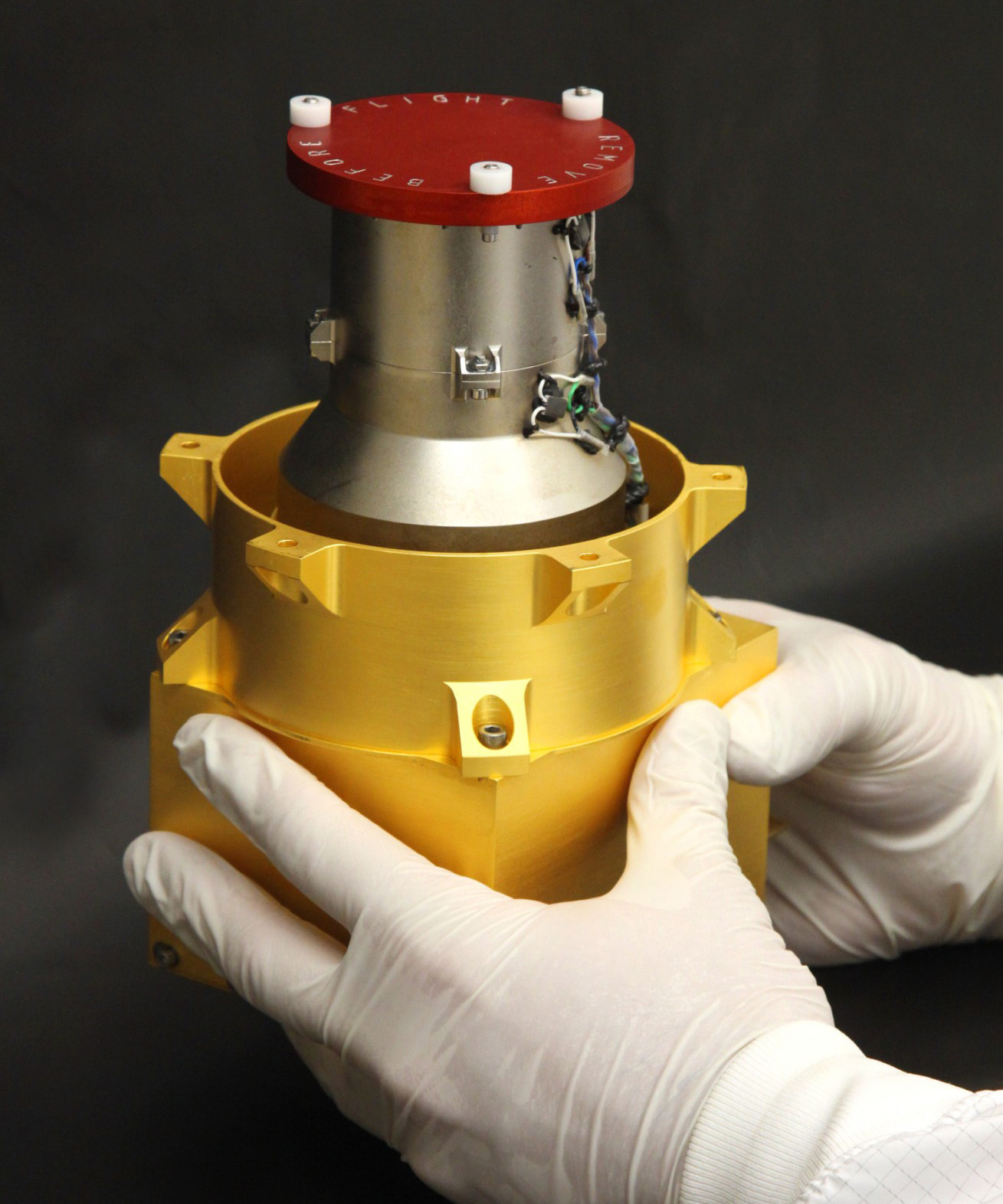
Radiation Assessment Detector

Japanese scientists from the Japan Aerospace Exploration Agency (JAXA) have discovered a huge cave on the moon with their Kaguya lunar probe, which could offer astronauts protection from dangerous radiation during future lunar landings, especially during the planned stopover of a Mars mission.

As part of a human mission to Mars, astronauts must be protected from cosmic radiation. During Curiosity's mission to Mars, a Radiation Assessment Detector (RAD) was used to measure radiation exposure. The radiation exposure of 1.8 millisieverts per day was mainly due to the constant presence of high-energy galactic particle radiation. In contrast, radiation from the sun accounted for only about three to five percent of the radiation levels measured during Curiosity's flight to Mars. On the way to Mars, the RAD instrument detected a total of five major radiation events caused by solar flares. To protect the astronauts, a plasma bubble will surround the spacecraft as an energy shield and its magnetic field will protect the crew from cosmic radiation. This would eliminate the need for conventional radiation shields, which are several centimeters thick and correspondingly heavy. In the Space Radiation Superconducting Shield (SR2S) project, which was completed in December 2015, magnesium diboride was found to be a suitable material for generating a suitable force field.

== Development of metrological principles of radiation protection ==
=== Dosimeter ===
Dosimeters are instruments used to measure radiation dose - as absorbed dose or dose equivalent - and are an important cornerstone of radiation protection.

==== Film dosimeter ====
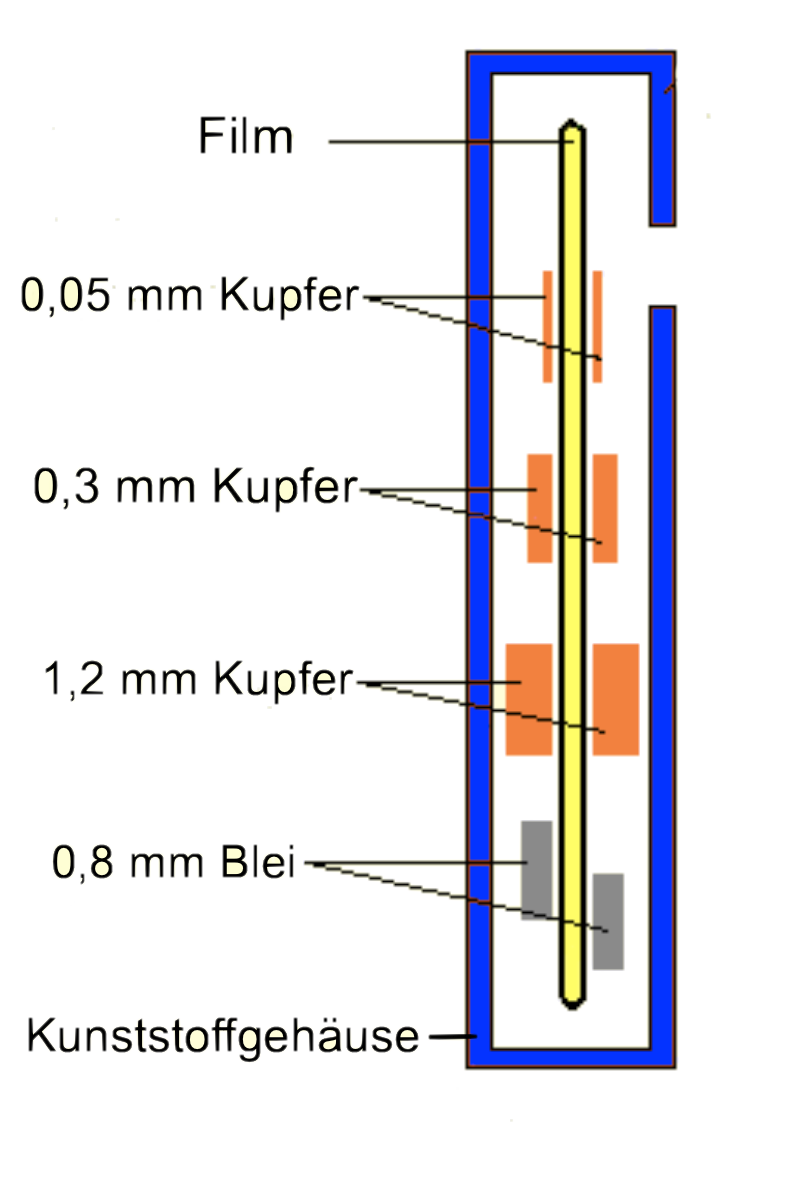
Schematic structure of a film dosimeter

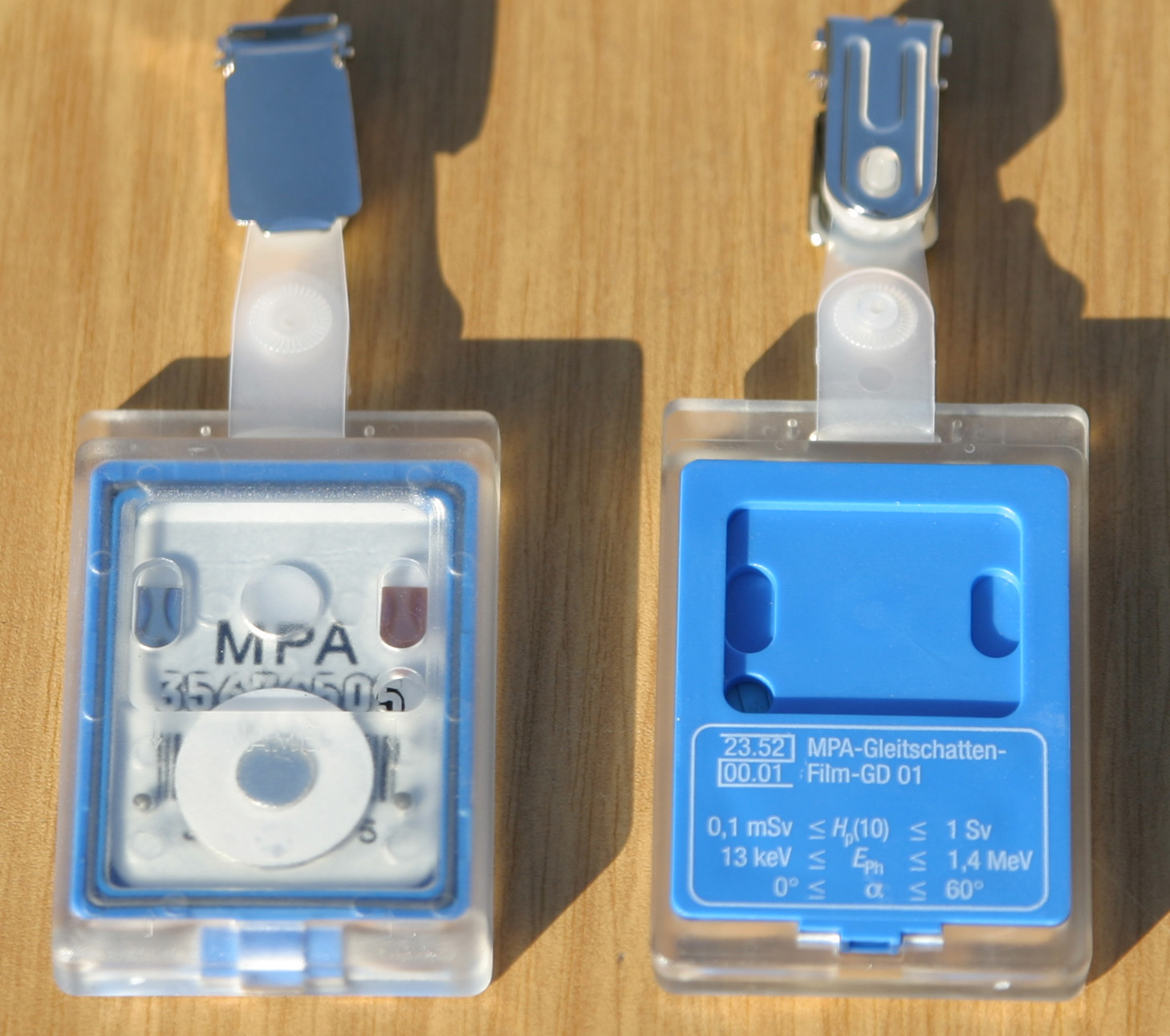
Film dosimeter

At the October 1907 meeting of the American Roentgen Ray Society, Rome Vernon Wagner, an X-ray tube manufacturer, reported that he had begun carrying a photographic plate in his pocket and developing it every evening. This allowed him to determine how much radiation he had been exposed to. This was the forerunner of the film dosimeter. His efforts came too late, as he had already developed cancer and died six months after the conference.

In the 1920s, the physical chemist John Eggert (1891-1973) played a key role in the introduction of film dosimetry for routine personal monitoring. Since then, it has been successively improved and, in particular, the evaluation technique has been automated since the 1960s. At the same time, Hermann Joseph Muller (1890-1967) discovered mutations as genetic consequences of X-rays, for which he was awarded the Nobel Prize in 1946. At the same time, the roentgen (R) was introduced as a unit for quantitative measurement of radiation exposure.

A dosimeter for film is divided into multiple segments, each containing a light- or radiation-sensitive film surrounded by layers of copper and lead with varying thickness. The degree of radiation penetration determines whether the segment is not blackened or blackened to varying degrees. The absorbed radiation effect during the measurement time is summed up, and the radiation dose can be determined from the blackening. Guidelines for evaluation exist, with those for Germany being published in 1994 and last updated on December 8, 2003.

==== Particle and quantum detectors ====
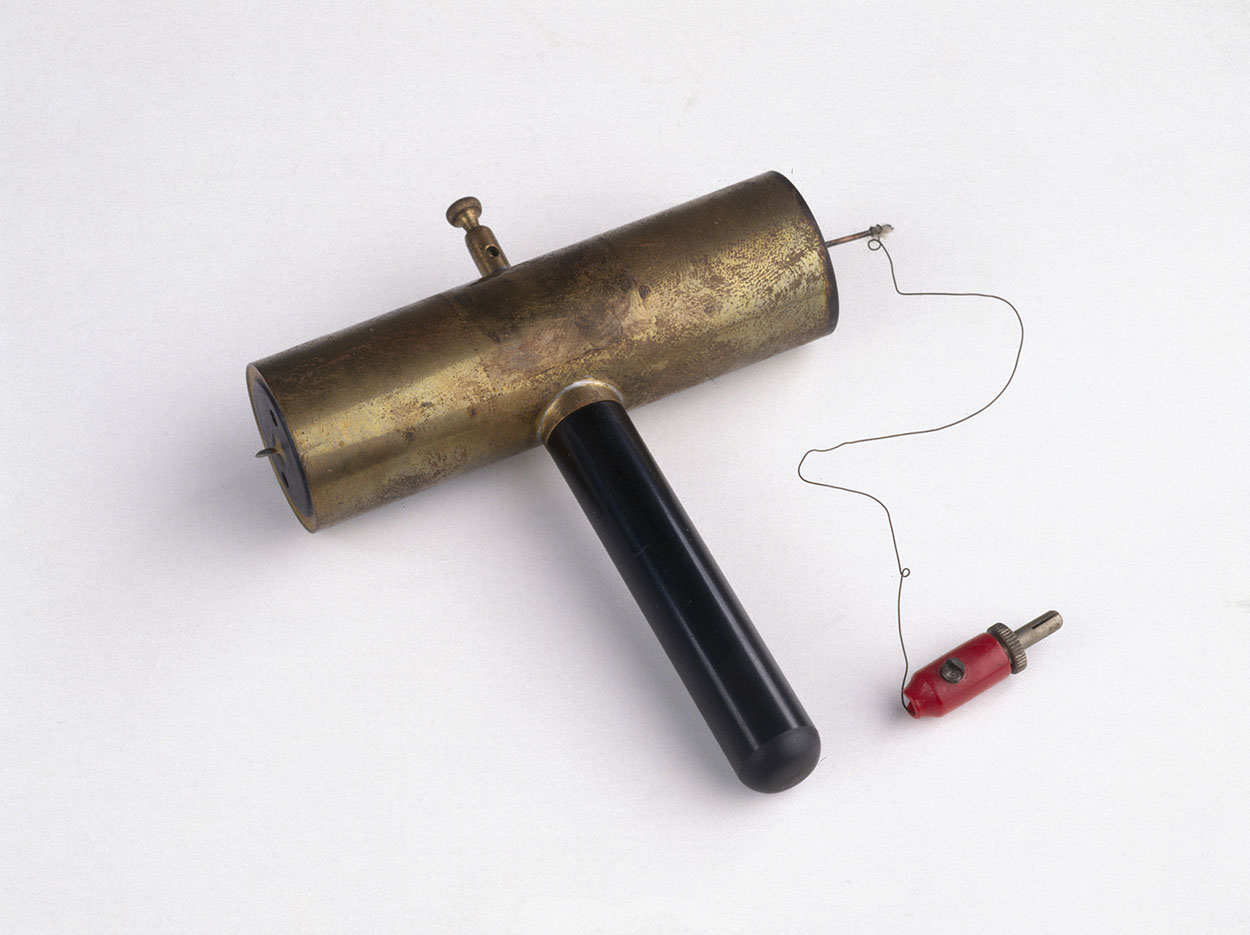
Geiger counter, 1932, Science Museum, London.

With the invention of the Geiger gaseous ionization detector in 1913, which became the Geiger-Müller gaseous ionization detector in 1928 - named after the physicists Hans Geiger (1882-1945) and Walther Müller (1905-1979) - the individual particles or quanta of ionizing radiation could be detected and measured. Detectors developed later, such as proportional counters or scintillation counters, which not only "count" but also measure energy and distinguish between types of radiation, also became important for radiation protection. Scintillation measurement is one of the oldest methods of detecting ionizing radiation or X-rays; originally, a zinc sulfide screen was held in the path of the beam and the scintillation events were either counted as flashes or, in the case of X-ray diagnostics, viewed as an image. A scintillation counter known as a spinthariscope was developed in 1903 by William Crookes (1832-1919) and used by Ernest Rutherford (1871-1937) to study the scattering of alpha particles from atomic nuclei.

==== Thermoluminescence dosimeter ====
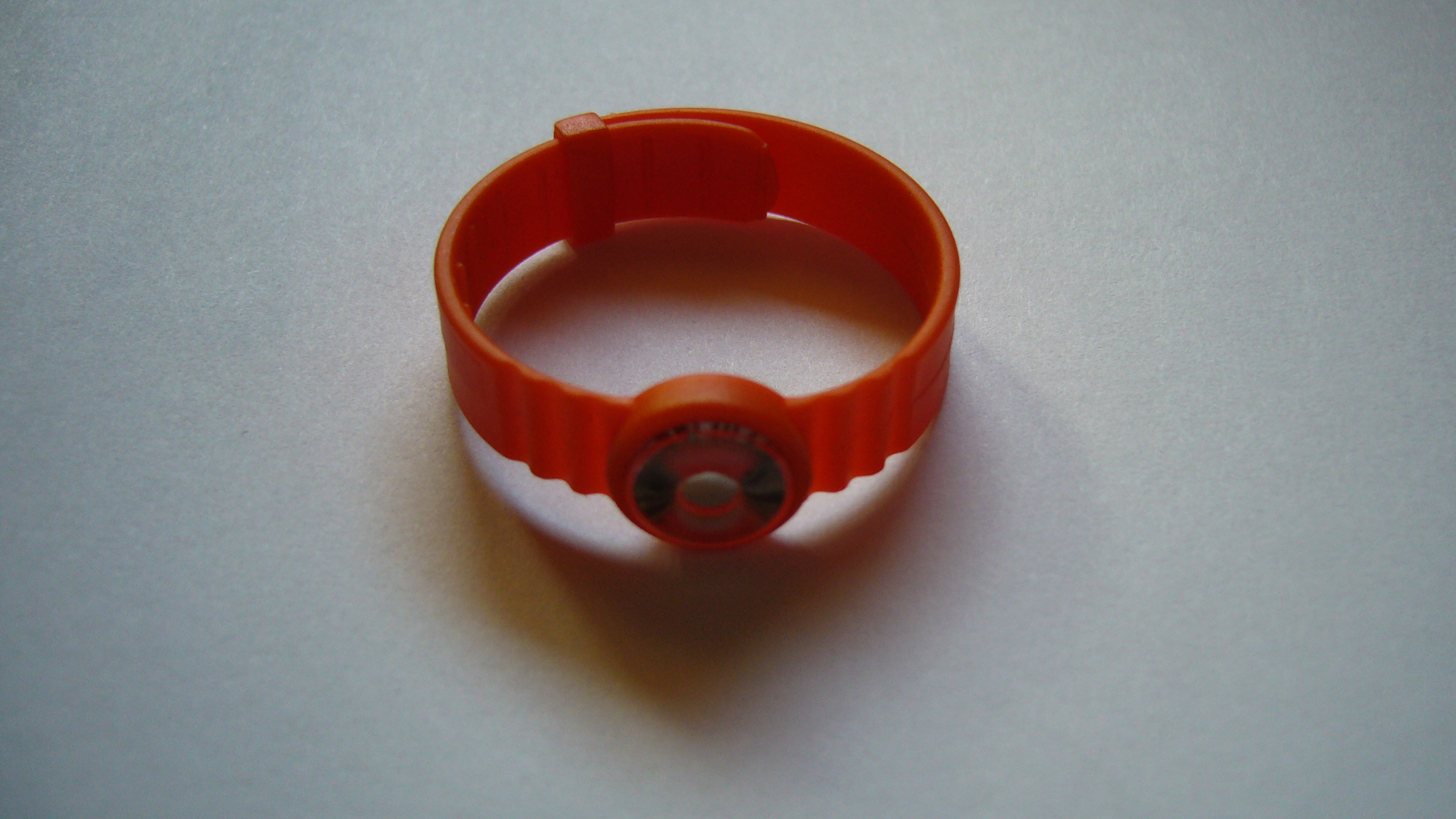
Thermoluminescence dosimeter in the form of a finger ring for measuring radiation exposure to fingers and hands

Lithium fluoride had already been proposed in the USA in 1950 by Farrington Daniels (1889-1972), Charles A. Boyd and Donald F. Saunders (1924-2013) for solid-state dosimetry using thermoluminescent dosimeters. The intensity of the thermoluminescent light is proportional to the amount of radiation previously absorbed. This type of dosimetry has been used since 1953 in the treatment of cancer patients and wherever people are occupationally exposed to radiation. The thermoluminescence dosimeter was followed by OSL dosimetry, which is not based on heat but on optically stimulated luminescence and was developed by Zenobia Jacobs and Richard Roberts at the University of Wollongong (Australia). The detector emits the stored energy as light. The light output, measured with photomultipliers, is then a measure of the dose.

=== Whole body counter ===
Since 2003, whole-body counters have been used in radiation protection to monitor the absorption (incorporation) of radionuclides in people who handle gamma-emitting open radioactive materials and who may be contaminated through food, inhalation of dusts and gases, or open wounds. (α and β emitters are not measurable).

=== Test specimen ===
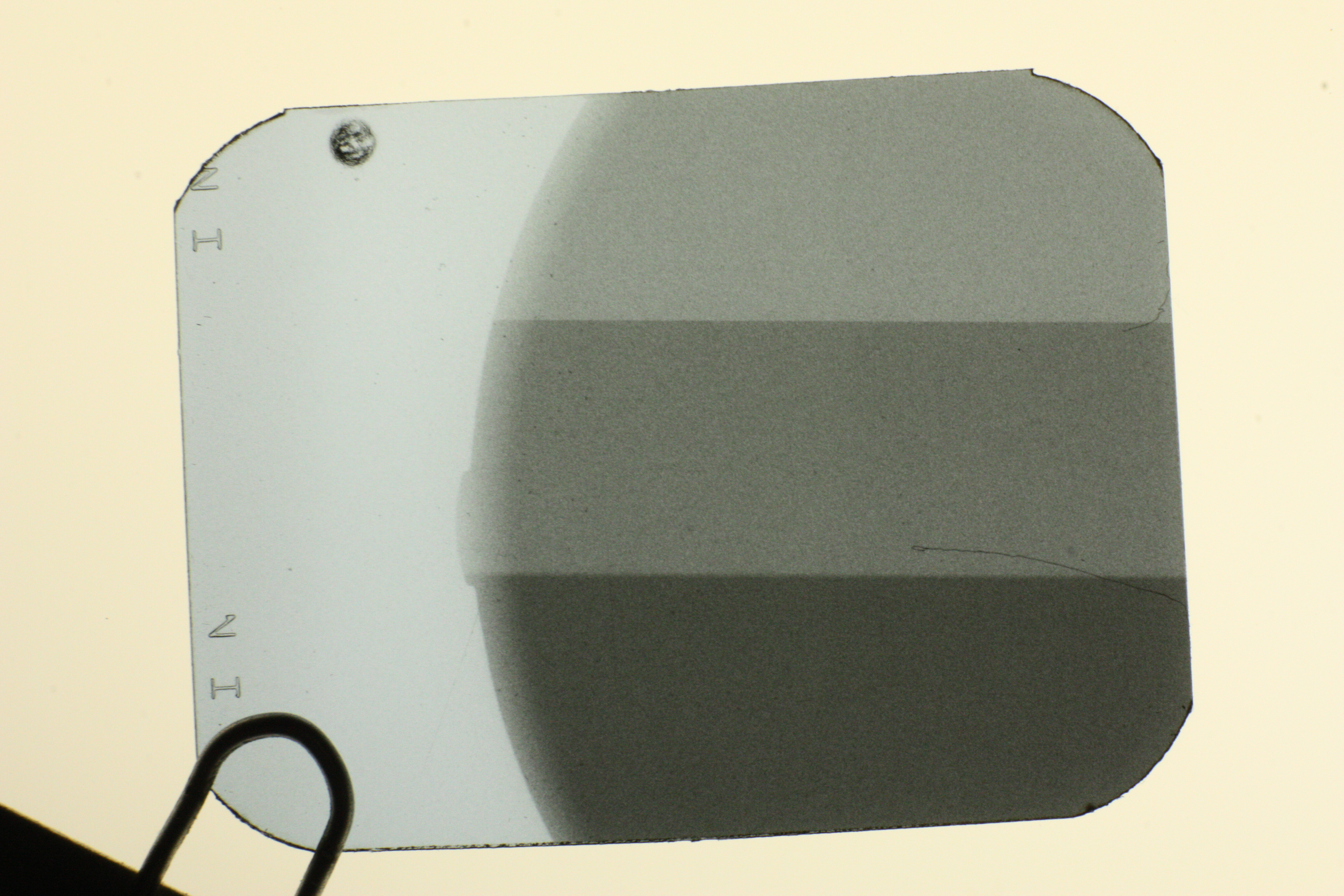
Constancy test of a dental X-ray image using a test specimen. The degree of blackening is compared with the original image at regular intervals.

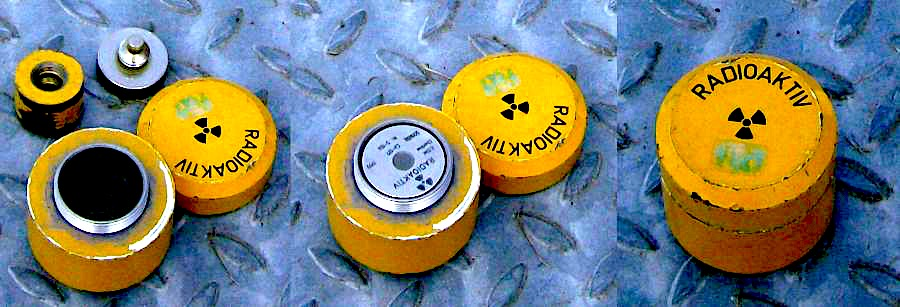
^{137}Cs test source. The radioactive material is contained in the two shiny metallic bodies, the enclosed emitters. The yellow shells are lead transport containers.

Constancy testing is the verification of reference values as part of quality assurance in x-ray diagnostics, nuclear medicine diagnostics, and radiotherapy. National regulations specify which parameters are to be tested, which limits are to be observed, which test methods are to be used, and which test samples are to be used. In Germany, the Radiation Protection in Medicine Directive and the relevant DIN 6855 standard in nuclear medicine require regular (in some cases daily) constancy testing. Test sources are used to check the response of probe measuring stations as well as in vivo and in vitro measuring stations. Before starting the tests, the background count rate and the setting of the energy window must be checked every working day, and the settings and the yield with reproducible geometry must be checked at least once a week with a suitable test source, e.g. 137Caesium (DIN 6855-1). The reference values for the constancy test are determined during the acceptance test.

Compact test specimens for medical X-ray images were not created until 1982. Prior to this, the patient himself often served as the object for producing X-ray test images. Prototypes of such an X-ray phantom with integrated structures were developed by Thomas Bronder at the Physikalisch-Technische Bundesanstalt.

A water phantom is a Plexiglas container filled with distilled water that is used as a substitute for living tissue to test electron linear accelerators used in radiation therapy. According to regulatory requirements, water phantom testing must be performed approximately every three months to ensure that the radiation dose delivered by the treatment system is consistent with the radiation planning.

The Alderson-Rando phantom, invented by Samuel W. Alderson (1914-2005), has become the standard X-ray phantom. It was followed by the Alderson Radio Therapy (ART) phantom, which he patented in 1967. The ART phantom is cut horizontally into 2.5 cm thick slices. Each slice has holes sealed with bone-equivalent, soft-tissue-equivalent, or lung-equivalent pins that can be replaced by thermoluminescent dosimeters. Alderson is also known as the inventor of the crash test dummy.

=== Dose reconstruction with ESR spectroscopy of deciduous teeth ===
As a result of accidents or improper use and disposal of radiation sources, a significant number of people are exposed to varying degrees of radiation. Radioactivity and local dose measurements are not sufficient to fully assess the effects of radiation. To retrospectively determine the individual radiation dose, measurements are made on teeth, i.e. on biological, endogenous materials. Tooth enamel is particularly suitable for the detection of ionizing radiation due to its high mineral content (hydroxyapatite), which has been known since 1968 thanks to the research of John M. Brady, Norman O. Aarestad and Harold M. Swartz. The measurements are performed on milk teeth, preferably molars, using electron paramagnetic resonance spectroscopy (ESR, EPR). The concentration of radicals generated by ionizing radiation is measured in the mineral part of the tooth. Due to the high stability of the radicals, this method can be used for dosimetry of long past exposures.

=== Dose reconstruction using biological dosimetry ===
Since about 1988, in addition to physical dosimetry, biological dosimetry has made it possible to reconstruct the individual dose of ionizing radiation. This is especially important for unforeseen and accidental exposures, where radiation exposures occur without physical dose monitoring. Biological markers, particularly cytogenetic markers in blood lymphocytes, are used for this purpose. Techniques for detecting radiation damage include analyzing dicentric chromosomes after acute radiation exposure. Dicentric chromosomes result from defective repair of chromosome breaks in two chromosomes, resulting in two centromeres instead of one like undamaged chromosomes. Symmetric translocations, detected through fluorescence in situ hybridization (FISH), are used after chronic or long-term exposure to radiation. The micronucleus test and the premature chromosome condensation (PCC) test are available to measure acute exposure.

== Measured variables and units ==
In principle, reducing the exposure of the human organism to ionizing radiation to zero is not possible and perhaps not even sensible. The human organism has been accustomed to natural radioactivity for thousands of years and ultimately this also triggers mutations (changes in genetic material), which are the cause of the development of life on earth. The mutation-inducing effect of high-energy radiation was first demonstrated in 1927 by Hermann Joseph Muller (1890-1967).

Three years after its establishment in 1958, the United Nations Scientific Committee on the Effects of Atomic Radiation adopted the Linear No-Threshold (LNT) model - a linear dose-effect relationship without a threshold - largely at the instigation of the Soviet Union. The dose-response relationship measured at high doses was extrapolated linearly to low doses. There would be no threshold, since even the smallest amounts of ionizing radiation would trigger some biological effect. The LNT model ignores not only possible radiation hormesis, but also the known ability of cells to repair genetic damage and the ability of the organism to remove damaged cells. Between 1963 and 1969, John W. Gofman (1918-2007) and Arthur R. Tamplin of the University of California, Berkeley, conducted research for the United States Atomic Energy Commission (USAEC, 1946-1974) investigating the relationship between radiation doses and cancer incidence. Their findings sparked a fierce controversy in the United States beginning in 1969. Starting in 1970, Ernest J. Sternglass, a radiologist at the University of Pittsburgh, published several studies describing the effect of radiation from nuclear tests and the vicinity of nuclear power plants on infant mortality. In 1971, the UASEC reduced the maximum allowable radiation dose by a factor of 100. Subsequently, nuclear technology was based on the principle of "As Low As Reasonably Achievable" (ALARA). This was a coherent principle as long as it was assumed that there was no threshold and that all doses were additive. In the meantime, a transition to "As High As Reasonably Safe" (AHARS) is increasingly being discussed. For the question of evacuation after accidents, a transition to AHARS seems absolutely necessary. In both the Chernobyl and Fukushima cases, hasty, poorly organized and poorly communicated evacuations caused psychological and physical damage to those affected - including documented deaths in the case of Fukushima. By some estimates, this damage is greater than would have been expected had the evacuation not taken place. Voices such as Geraldine Thomas therefore question such evacuations in principle and call for a transition to shelter-in-place wherever possible.

=== Absorbed dose and dose equivalent ===
The British physicist and radiologist and founder of radiobiology Louis Harold Gray (1905-1965) introduced the unit Rad (acronym for radiation absorbed dose) in the 1930s, which was renamed Gray (Gy) after him in 1978. One gray is a mass-specific quantity and corresponds to the energy of one joule absorbed by one kilogram of body weight. Acute whole-body exposures in excess of four Gy are usually fatal to humans.

The different types of radiation ionize to different degrees. Ionization is any process in which one or more electrons are removed from an atom or molecule, leaving the atom or molecule as a positively charged ion (cation). Each type of radiation is therefore assigned a dimensionless weighting factor that expresses its biological effectiveness. For X-rays, gamma and beta radiation, the factor is one, alpha radiation reaches a factor of twenty, and for neutron radiation it is between five and twenty, depending on the energy.

Multiplying the absorbed dose in Gy by the weighting factor gives the equivalent dose, expressed in Sievert (Sv). It is named after the Swedish physician and physicist Rolf Maximilian Sievert (1896-1966). Sievert was the founder of radiation protection research and developed the Sievert chamber in 1929 to measure the intensity of X-rays. He founded the International Commission on Radiation Units and Measurements (ICRU) and later became chairman of the International Commission on Radiological Protection (ICRP). The ICRU and ICRP specify differently defined weighting factors that apply to environmental measurements (quality factor) and body-related dose equivalent data (radiation weighting factor).

In relation to the body, the relevant dose term is the Organ Equivalent Dose (formerly "Organ Dose"). This is the dose equivalent averaged over an organ. Multiplied by organ-specific tissue weighting factors and summed over all organs, the effective dose is obtained, which represents a dose balance. In relation to environmental measurements, the ambient dose equivalent or local dose is relevant. Its increase over time is called the local dose rate.

Even at very low effective doses, stochastic effects (genetic and cancer risk) are expected. At effective doses above 0.1 Sv, deterministic effects also occur (tissue damage up to radiation sickness at very high doses). Correspondingly high radiation doses are now only given in units of Gy. Natural radiation exposure in Germany, with an annual average effective dose of about 0.002 Sv, is well below this range.

=== Tolerance dose ===
In 1931, the U.S. Advisory Committee on X-Ray and Radium Protection (ACXRP, now the National Council on Radiation Protection and Measurements, NCRP), founded in 1929, published the results of a study on the so-called tolerance dose, on which a scientifically based radiation protection guideline was based. Exposure limits were gradually lowered. In 1936 the tolerance dose was 0.1 R/day. The unit "R" (the X-ray) from the CGS unit system has been obsolete since the end of 1985. Since then, the SI unit of ion dose has been "coulomb per kilogram".

=== Relative biological effectiveness ===
After World War II, the concept of tolerance dose was replaced by that of maximum permissible dose and the concept of relative biological effectiveness was introduced. The limit was set in 1956 by the National Council on Radiation Protection & Measurements (NCRP) and the International Commission on Radiological Protection (ICRP) at 5 rem (50 mSv) per year for radiation workers and 0.5 rem per year for the general population. The unit Rem as a physical measure of radiation dose (from the English roentgen equivalent in man) was replaced by the unit Sv (sievert) in 1978. This was due to the advent of nuclear energy and its associated dangers. Prior to 1991, the equivalent dose was used both as a measure of dose and as a term for the body dose that determines the course and survival of radiation sickness. ICRP Publication 60 introduced the radiation weighting factor $w_R$ was introduced. For examples of equivalent doses as body doses, see

- Order of magnitude of the dose equivalent
- Order of magnitude of the local dose rate.

=== Banana equivalent dose ===
The origin of the concept of using a banana equivalent dose (BED) as a benchmark is unknown. In 1995, Gary Mansfield of the Lawrence Livermore National Laboratory found the Banana Equivalent Dose (BED) to be very useful in explaining radiation risks to the public. It is not a formally used dose.

The banana equivalent dose is the dose of ionizing radiation to which a person is exposed by eating one banana. Bananas contain potassium. Natural potassium consists of 0.0117% of the radioactive isotope ^{40}K (potassium-40) and has a specific activity of 30,346 becquerels per kilogram, or about 30 becquerels per gram. The radiation dose from eating a banana is about 0.1 μSv. The value of this reference dose is given as "1" and thus becomes the "unit of measurement" banana equivalent dose. Consequently, other radiation exposures can be compared to the consumption of one banana. For example, the average daily total radiation exposure of a person is 100 banana equivalent doses.

At 0.17 mSv per year, almost 10 percent of natural radioactive exposure in Germany (an average of 2.1 mSv per year) is caused by the body's own (vital) potassium.

The banana equivalent dose does not take into account the fact that no radioactive nuclide is accumulated in the body through the consumption of potassium-containing foods. The potassium content of the body is in homeostasis and is kept constant.

== Disregard of radiation protection ==
=== Unethical radiation experiments ===
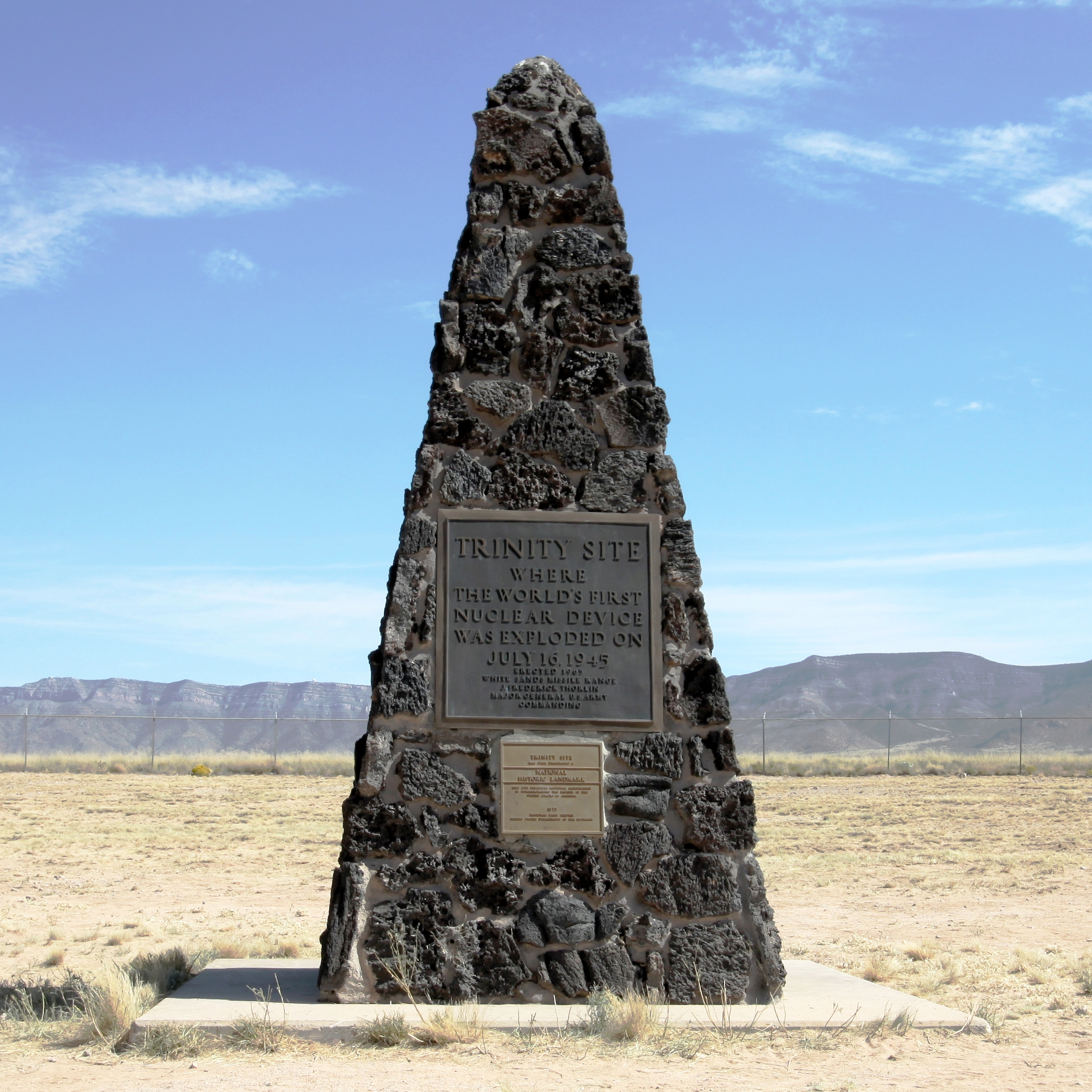
Trinity obelisk commemorating the first nuclear explosion on July 16, 1945

The Trinity test was the first nuclear weapon explosion conducted as part of the US Manhattan Project. There were no warnings to residents about the fallout, nor information about shelters or possible evacuations.

This was followed in 1946 by tests in the Marshall Islands (Operation Crossroads), as recounted by chemist Harold Carpenter Hodge (1904-1990), toxicologist for the Manhattan Project, in his lecture (1947) as president of the International Association for Dental Research. Hodge's reputation was severely damaged by historian Eileen Welsome's 1999 Pulitzer Prize-winning book The Plutonium Files - America's Secret Medical Experiments in the Cold War. She documents horrific human experiments in which the subjects (including Hodge) were unaware that they were being used as "guinea pigs" to test the safety limits of uranium and plutonium. The experiments on the unidentified subjects were continued by the United States Atomic Energy Commission (AEC) into the 1970s.

The abuse of radiation continues to this day. During the Cold War, ethically reprehensible radiation experiments were conducted in the United States on untrained human subjects to determine the detailed effects of radiation on human health. Between 1945 and 1947, 18 people were injected with plutonium by Manhattan Project doctors. In Nashville, pregnant women were given radioactive mixtures. In Cincinnati, about 200 patients were irradiated over a 15-year period. In Chicago, 102 people received injections of strontium and caesium solutions. In Massachusetts, 57 children with developmental disorders were given oatmeal with radioactive markers. These radiation experiments were not stopped until 1993 under President Bill Clinton. But the injustice committed was not atoned for. For years, uranium hexafluoride caused radiation damage at a DuPont Company plant and to local residents. At times, the plant even deliberately released uranium hexafluoride in its heated gaseous state into the surrounding area to study the effects of the radioactive and chemically aggressive gas.

=== Stasi border controls ===
Between 1978 and 1989, vehicles were checked with ^{137}Cs gamma sources at 17 border crossings between the German Democratic Republic and the Federal Republic of Germany. According to the Transit Agreement, vehicles could only be screened if there was reasonable suspicion. For this reason, the Ministry for State Security (Stasi) installed and operated a secret radioactive screening technology, codenamed "Technik V," which was generally used to screen all transit passengers to detect "deserters from the Republic." Ordinary GDR customs officers were unaware of the secret radioactive screening technology and were subject to strict "entry regulations" designed to "protect" them as much as possible from radiation exposure. Lieutenant General Heinz Fiedler (1929-1993), as the highest ranking border guard of the MfS, was responsible for all radiation controls. On February 17, 1995, the Radiation Protection Commission published a statement in which it said: "Even if we assume that individual persons stopped more frequently in the radiation field and that a fluoroscopy lasting up to three minutes increases the annual radiation exposure by one to a few mSv, this does not result in a dose that is harmful to health". In contrast, the designer of this type of border control calculated 15 nSv per crossing. Lorenz of the former State Office for Radiation Protection and Nuclear Safety of the GDR came up with a dose estimate of 1000 nSv, which was corrected to 50 nSv a few weeks later.

=== Radar systems ===
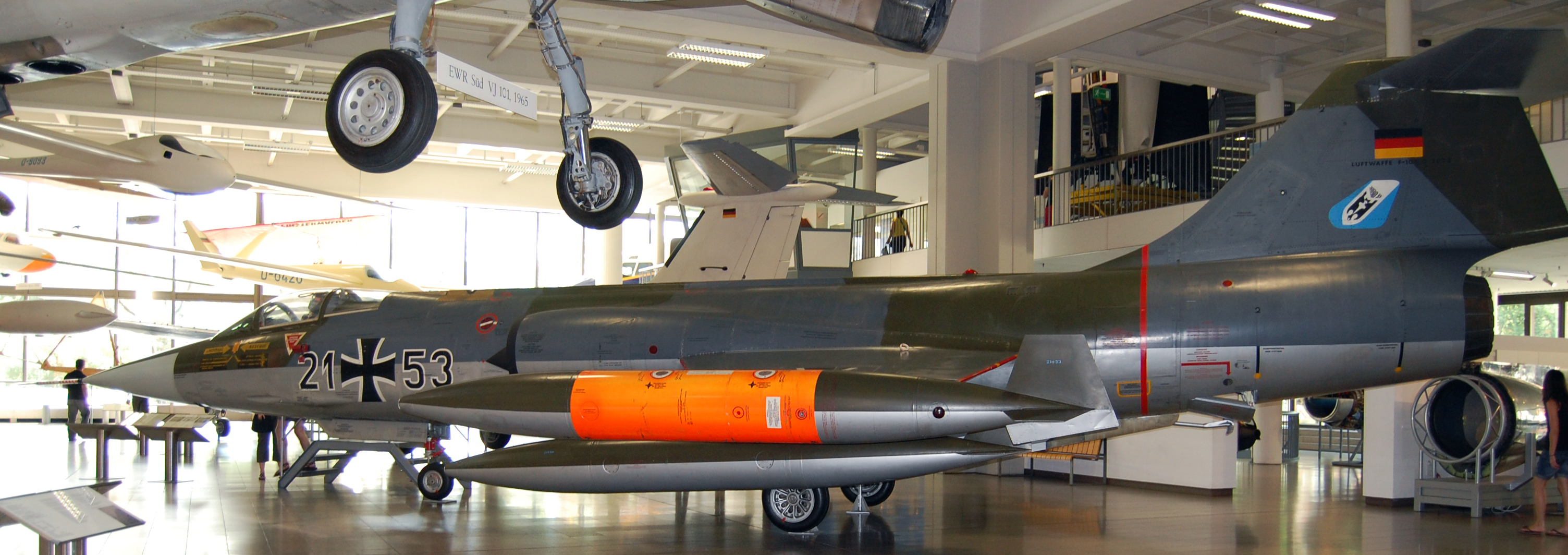
The on-board radar of the Lockheed F-104 (Starfighter) had to be adjusted during operation, which led to high radiation exposure.

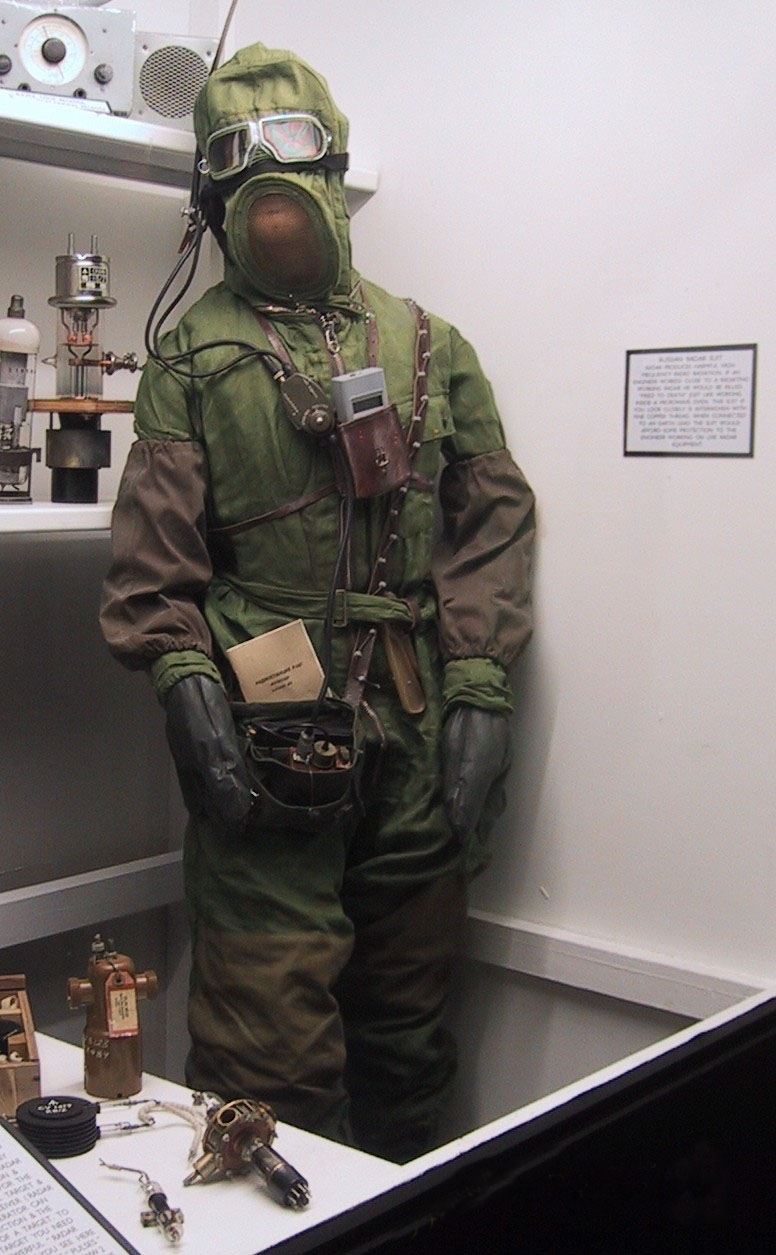
Russian protective suit for work on radar systems. Hack Green Nuclear Bunker Museum, Nantwich, England

Radar equipment is used at airports, in airplanes, at missile sites, on tanks, and on ships. The radar technology commonly used in the 20th century produced X-rays as a technically unavoidable by-product in the high-voltage electronics of the equipment. In the 1960s and 1970s, German soldiers and technicians were largely unaware of the dangers, as were those in the GDR's National People's Army. The problem had been known internationally since the 1950s, and to the German Armed Forces since at least 1958. However, no radiation protection measures were taken, such as the wearing of lead aprons. Until about the mid-1980s, radiation shielding was inadequate, especially for pulse switch tubes. Particularly affected were maintenance technicians (radar mechanics) who were exposed to the X-ray generating parts for hours without any protection. The permissible annual limit value could be exceeded after just 3 minutes. It was not until 1976 that warning notices were put up and protective measures taken in the German Navy, and not until the early 1980s in general. As late as the 1990s, the German Armed Forces denied any connection between radar equipment and cancer or genetic damage. The number of victims amounted to several thousand. The connection was later acknowledged by the German Armed Forces and in many cases a supplementary pension was paid. In 2012, a foundation was set up to provide unbureaucratic compensation for the victims.

== Radiation protection crimes ==
=== Nazi experiments ===
The harmful effects of X-rays were recognized during the Nazism era. The function of the gonads (ovaries or testicles) was destroyed by ionizing radiation, leading to infertility. In July 1942, Heinrich Himmler (1900-1945) decided to conduct forced sterilization experiments at the Auschwitz-Birkenau concentration camp, which were carried out by Horst Schumann (1906-1983), previously a doctor in Aktion T4. Each test victim had to stand between two X-ray machines, which were arranged in such a way that the test victim had just enough space between them. Opposite the x-ray machines was a booth with lead walls and a small window. From the booth, Schumann could direct X-rays at the test victims' sexual organs without endangering himself. Human radiation castration experiments were also conducted in concentration camps under the direction of Viktor Brack (1904-1948). As part of the "Law for the Prevention of Hereditary Diseases," people were often subjected to radiation castration during interrogations without their knowledge. Approximately 150 radiologists from hospitals throughout Germany participated in the forced castration of approximately 7,200 people using X-rays or radium.

=== Polonium murder ===
On November 23, 2006, Alexander Alexanderovich Litvinenko (1962-2006) was murdered under unexplained circumstances as a result of radiation sickness caused by polonium. This was also briefly suspected in the case of Yasser Arafat (1929-2004), who died in 2004.

=== Radiation offenses ===
The misuse of ionizing radiation is a radiation offence under German criminal law. The use of ionizing radiation to harm persons or property is punishable. Since 1998, the regulations can be found in § 309 StGB (in German) (previously § 311a StGB old version); the regulations go back to § 41 AtG old version. In the Austrian Criminal Code, relevant criminal offenses are defined in the seventh section, "Criminal acts dangerous to the public" and "Criminal acts against the environment". In Switzerland, endangerment by nuclear energy, radioactive substances or ionizing radiation is punishable under Art. 326 of the Swiss Criminal Code and disregard of safety regulations under Chapter 9 of the Nuclear Energy Act of 21 March 2003.

== Radiation protection for less energetic types of radiation ==
Spectrum of electromagnetic waves; below the range of visible light.

Originally, the term radiation protection referred only to ionizing radiation. Today, non-ionizing radiation is also included and is the responsibility of the Federal Office for Radiation Protection, the Radiation Protection Division of the Federal Office of Public Health and the Ministry of Climate Action and Energy (Austria). The project collected, evaluated and compared data on the legal situation in all European countries (47 countries plus Germany) and major non-European countries (China, India, Australia, Japan, Canada, New Zealand and the USA) regarding electric, magnetic and electromagnetic fields (EMF) and optical radiation (OS). The results were very different and in some cases deviated from the recommendations of the International Commission on Non-Ionizing Radiation Protection (ICNIRP).

=== UV light ===
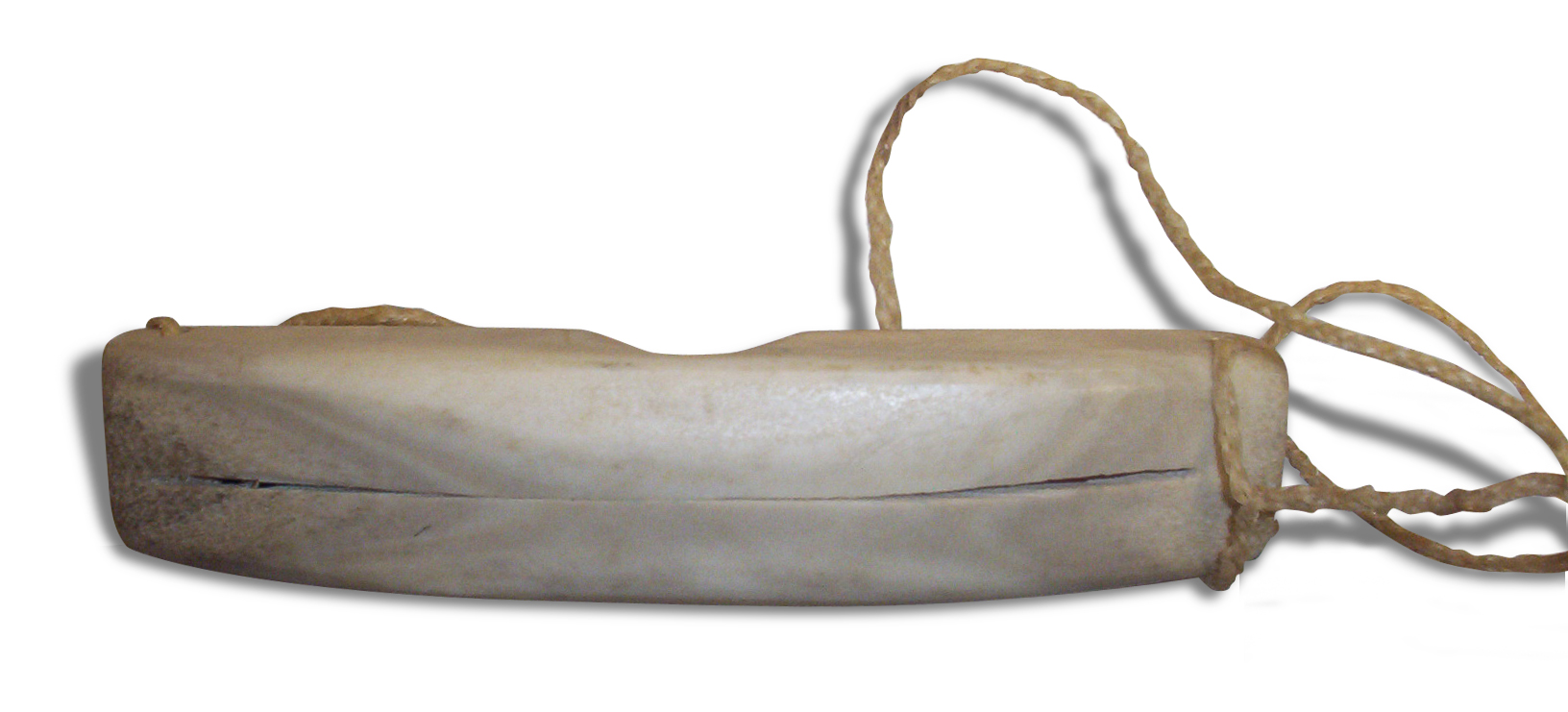
Inuit goggles

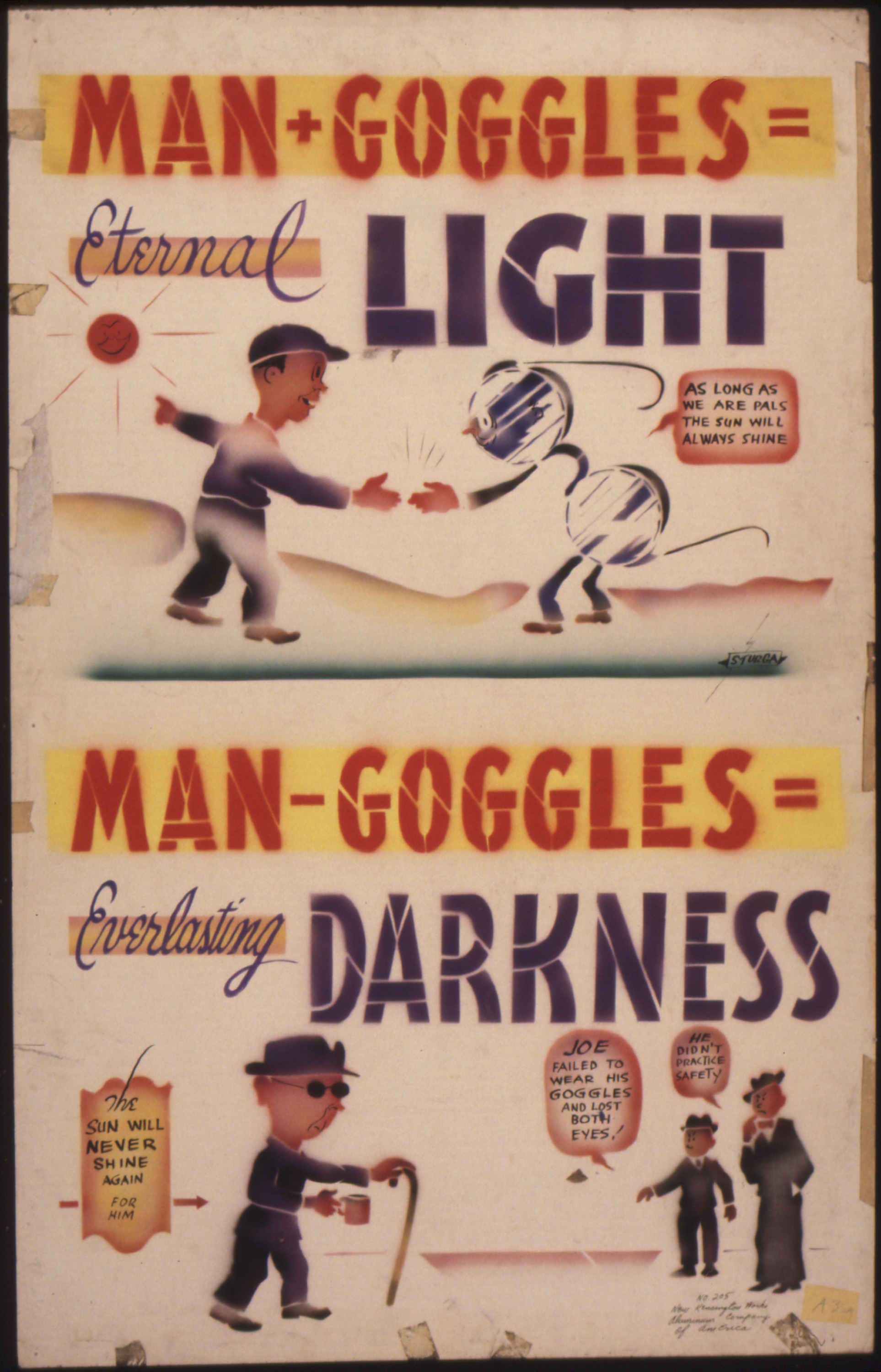
Poster warning of eye damage from sunlight, Office for Emergency Management. War Production Board, USA, ca. 1942

For many centuries, the Inuit (Eskimos) have used snow goggles with narrow slits, carved from seal bones or reindeer antlers, to protect against snow blindness (photokeratitis).

Warning of optical radiation in accordance with DIN EN ISO 7010

In the 1960s, Australia - particularly Queensland - launched the first awareness campaign on the dangers of ultraviolet (UV) radiation in the spirit of primary prevention. In the 1980s, many countries in Europe and overseas initiated similar UV protection campaigns. UV radiation has a thermal effect on the skin and eyes and can lead to skin cancer (malignant melanoma) and eye inflammation or cataracts. To protect the skin from harmful UV radiation, such as photodermatosis, acne aestivalis, actinic keratosis or urticaria solaris, normal clothing, special UV protective clothing (SPF 40-50) and high SPF sunscreen can be used. The Australian-New Zealand Standard (AS/NZS 4399) of 1996 measures new textile materials in an unstretched and dry state for the manufacture of protective clothing worn while bathing, especially by children, and for the manufacture of shading textiles (sunshades, awnings). The UV Standard 801 assumes a maximum radiation intensity with the solar spectrum in Melbourne, Australia, on January 1 of a year (at the height of the Australian summer), the most sensitive skin type of the wearer, and under wearing conditions. As the solar spectrum in the northern hemisphere differs from that in Australia, the measurement method according to the European standard EN 13758-1 is based on the solar spectrum of Albuquerque (New Mexico, USA), which corresponds approximately to that of southern Europe.

To protect your eyes, wear sunglasses with UV protection or special goggles that also shield the sides to prevent snow blindness. A defensive reaction of the skin is the formation of a light callus, the skin's own sun protection, which corresponds to a protection factor of about 5. At the same time, the production of brown skin pigments (melanin) in the corresponding cells (melanocytes) is stimulated.

A solar control film is usually a film made of polyethylene terephthalate (PET) that is applied to windows to reduce the light and heat from the sun's rays. The film filters UV-A and UV-B radiation. Polyethylene terephthalate goes back to an invention by the two Englishmen John Rex Whinfield (1902-1966) and James Tennant Dickson in 1941.

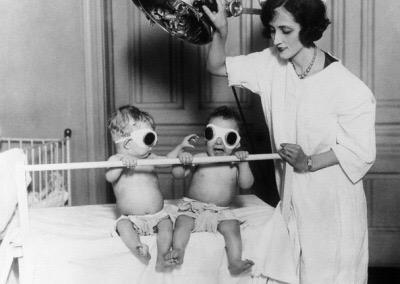
UV irradiation of children to stimulate the formation of vitamin D in rickets, 1925

The fact that UV-B radiation (Dorno radiation, after Carl Dorno (1865-1942)) is a proven carcinogen, but is also required for the body's own synthesis of vitamin-D_{3} (cholecalciferol), leads to internationally conflicting recommendations regarding health-promoting UV exposure. In 2014, based on the scientific evidence of the last decades, 20 scientific authorities, professional societies and associations from the fields of radiation protection, health, risk assessment, medicine and nutrition published a recommendation on "UV exposure for the formation of the body's own vitamin D". It was the first interdisciplinary recommendation on this topic worldwide. Using a solarium for the first time at a young age (<35 years) almost doubles the risk of developing malignant melanoma. In Germany, the use of tanning beds by minors has been prohibited by law since March 2010. As of August 1, 2012, sunbeds must not exceed a maximum irradiance of 0.3 watts per square meter of skin. Sunbeds must be labeled accordingly. The new irradiance limit corresponds to the highest UV dose that can be measured on Earth at 12 noon under a cloudless sky at the equator.

The minimum erythema dose (MED) is determined for medical applications. The MED is defined as the lowest dose of radiation that produces a barely visible erythema. It is determined 24 hours after the test irradiation. It is performed with the type of lamp intended for the therapy by applying so-called light stairs to skin that is not normally exposed to light (for example, on the buttocks).

=== Sun lamp ===
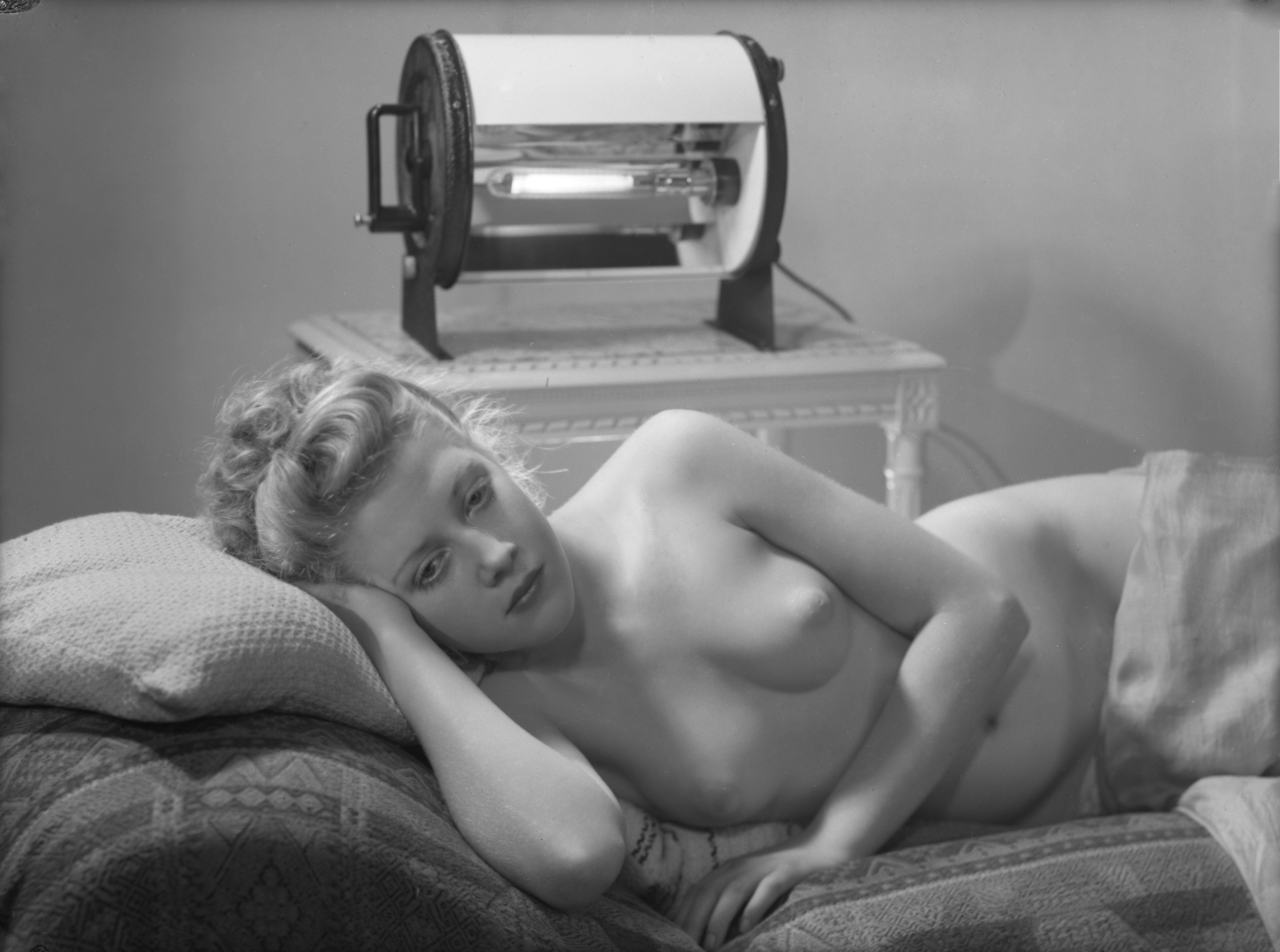
Advertisement by Philips for a sun lamp, 1946

Richard Küch (1860-1915) was able to melt quartz glass - the basis for UV radiation sources - for the first time in 1890 and founded the Heraeus Quarzschmelze. He developed the first quartz lamp (sun lamp) for generating UV radiation in 1904, thus laying the foundation for this form of light therapy.

Despite the dosage problems, doctors increasingly used quartz lamps in the early 20th century. Internal medicine specialists and dermatologists were among the most eager testers. After successful treatment of skin tuberculosis, internal medicine began to treat tuberculous pleurisy, glandular tuberculosis and intestinal tuberculosis. In addition, doctors tested the effect of quartz lamps on other infectious diseases such as syphilis, metabolic diseases, cardiovascular diseases, nerve pain such as sciatica, or nervous diseases such as neurasthenia and hysteria. In dermatology, fungal diseases, ulcers and wounds, psoriasis, acne, freckles and hair loss were also treated with quartz lamps, while in gynecology, abdominal diseases were treated with quartz lamps. Rejuvenation specialists used artificial high-altitude sunlight to stimulate gonadal activity and treated infertility, impotentia generandi (inability to conceive), and lack of sexual desire by irradiating the genitals. For this purpose, Philipp Keller (1891-1973) developed an erythema dosimeter with which he measured the amount of radiation not in Finsen units (UV radiation with a wavelength λ of 296.7 nm and an irradiance E of 10^{−5} W/m^{2}), but in height solar units (HSE). It was the only instrument in use around 1930, but it was not widely accepted in medical circles.

Treatment of acne with ultraviolet radiation is still controversial. Although UV radiation can have an antibacterial effect, it can also induce proliferative hyperkeratosis. This can lead to the formation of comedones ("blackheads"). Phototoxic effects may also occur. In addition, it is carcinogenic and promotes skin aging. UV therapy is increasingly being abandoned in favor of photodynamic therapy.

=== Laser ===
Warning signs against laser beams according to DIN EN ISO 7010

The ruby laser was developed in 1960 by Theodore Maiman (1927-2007) as the first laser based on the ruby maser. Soon after, the dangers of lasers were discovered, especially for the eyes and skin, due to the laser's low penetration depth. Lasers have numerous applications in technology and research as well as in everyday life, from simple laser pointers to distance measuring devices, cutting and welding tools, reproduction of optical storage media such as CDs, DVDs and Blu-ray discs, communication, laser scalpels and other devices using laser light in everyday medical practice. The Radiation Protection Commission requires that laser applications on human skin be performed only by a specially trained physician. Lasers are also used for show effects in discotheques and at events.

Matches can be lit within tenths of a second using a powerful laser pointer.

Lasers can cause biological damage due to the properties of their radiation and their sometimes extremely concentrated electromagnetic power. For this reason, lasers must be labeled with standardized warnings depending on the laser class. The classification is based on the DIN standard EN 60825-1, which distinguishes between ranges of wavelengths and exposure times that lead to characteristic injuries and injury thresholds for power or energy density.

The CO_{2}-Laser was developed in 1964 by the Indian electrical engineer and physicist Chandra Kumar Naranbhai Patel (*1938) at the same time as the Nd:YAG laser (neodymium-doped yttrium aluminum garnet laser) at Bell Laboratories by LeGrand Van Uitert (1922-1999) and Joseph E. Geusic (*1931) and the Er:YAG laser (erbium-doped yttrium aluminum garnet laser) and has been used in dentistry since the early 1970s. In the hard laser field, two systems in particular are emerging for use in the oral cavity: the CO_{2} laser for use in soft tissue and the Er:YAG laser for use in dental hard and soft tissue. The goal of soft laser treatment is to achieve biostimulation with low energy densities.

The Commission on Radiological Protection strongly recommends that the possession and purchase of class 3B and 4 laser pointers be regulated by law to prevent misuse. This is due to the increase in dangerous dazzle attacks caused by high-power laser pointers. In addition to pilots, these include truck and car drivers, train operators, soccer players, referees, and even spectators at soccer games. Such glare can lead to serious accidents and, in the case of pilots and truck drivers, to occupational disability due to eye damage. The first accident prevention regulation was published on April 1, 1988 as BGV B2, followed on January 1, 1997 by DGUV Regulation 11 of the German Social Accident Insurance. Between January and mid-September 2010, the German Federal Aviation Office registered 229 dazzle attacks on helicopters and airplanes of German airlines nationwide. On October 18, 2017, a perpetrator of a dazzle attack on a federal police helicopter was sentenced to one year and six months in prison without parole.

=== Electromagnetic radiation exposure ===
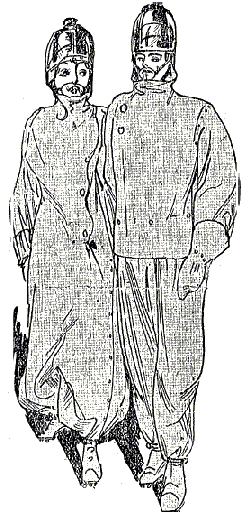
Protective clothing designed to protect against the waves of radio telegraphs (1911).

Electrosmog is colloquially understood as the exposure of humans and the environment to electric, magnetic and electromagnetic fields, some of which are believed to have undesirable biological effects. Electromagnetic environmental compatibility (EMC) refers to the effects on living organisms, some of which are considered electrosensitive. Fears of such effects have existed since the beginning of technological use in the mid-19th century. In 1890, for example, officials of the Royal General Directorate in Bavaria were forbidden to attend the opening ceremony of Germany's first alternating current power plant, the Reichenhall Electricity Works, or to enter the machine room. With the establishment of the first radio telegraphy and its telegraph stations, the U.S. magazine The Atlanta Constitution reported in April 1911 on the potential dangers of radio telegraph waves, which, in addition to "tooth loss," were said to cause hair loss and make people "crazy" over time. Full-body protection was recommended as a preventive measure.

During the second half of the 20th century, other sources of electromagnetic fields have become the focus of health concerns, such as power lines, photovoltaic systems, microwave ovens, computer and television screens, security devices, radar equipment, and more recently, cordless telephones (DECT), cell phones, their base stations, energy-saving lamps, and Bluetooth connections. Electrified railroad lines, tram overhead lines and subway tracks are also strong sources of electrosmog. In 1996, the World Health Organization (WHO) launched the EMF (ElectroMagnetic Fields) Project to bring together current knowledge and available resources from key international and national organizations and scientific institutions on electromagnetic fields. The German Federal Office for Radiation Protection (BfS) published the following recommendation in 2006:

"In order to avoid possible health risks, the German Federal Office for Radiation Protection recommends that you minimize your personal exposure to radiation through your own initiative."

— German Federal Office for Radiation Protection, January 31, 2006,

As of 2016, the EMF Guideline 2016 of EUROPAEM (European Academy For Environmental Medicine) on the prevention, diagnosis and treatment of EMF-related complaints and diseases applies.

==== Microwaves ====
A microwave oven, invented in 1950 by U.S. researcher Percy Spencer (1894-1970), is used to quickly heat food using microwave radiation at a frequency of 2.45 gigahertz. In an intact microwave oven, leakage radiation is relatively low due to the shielding of the cooking chamber. An "emission limit of five milliwatts per square centimeter (equivalent to 50 watts per square meter) at a distance of five centimeters from the surface of the appliance" (radiation density or power flux density) is specified. Children should not stand directly in front of or next to the appliance while food is being prepared. In addition, the Federal Office for Radiation Protection lists pregnant women as particularly at risk.

In microwave therapy, electromagnetic waves are generated for heat treatment. The penetration depth and energy distribution vary depending on the frequency of application (short waves, ultra short waves, microwaves). To achieve greater penetration, pulsed microwaves are used, each of which delivers high energy to the tissue. A pulse pause ensures that no burns occur. Metal implants and pacemakers are contraindications.

==== Cell phones ====
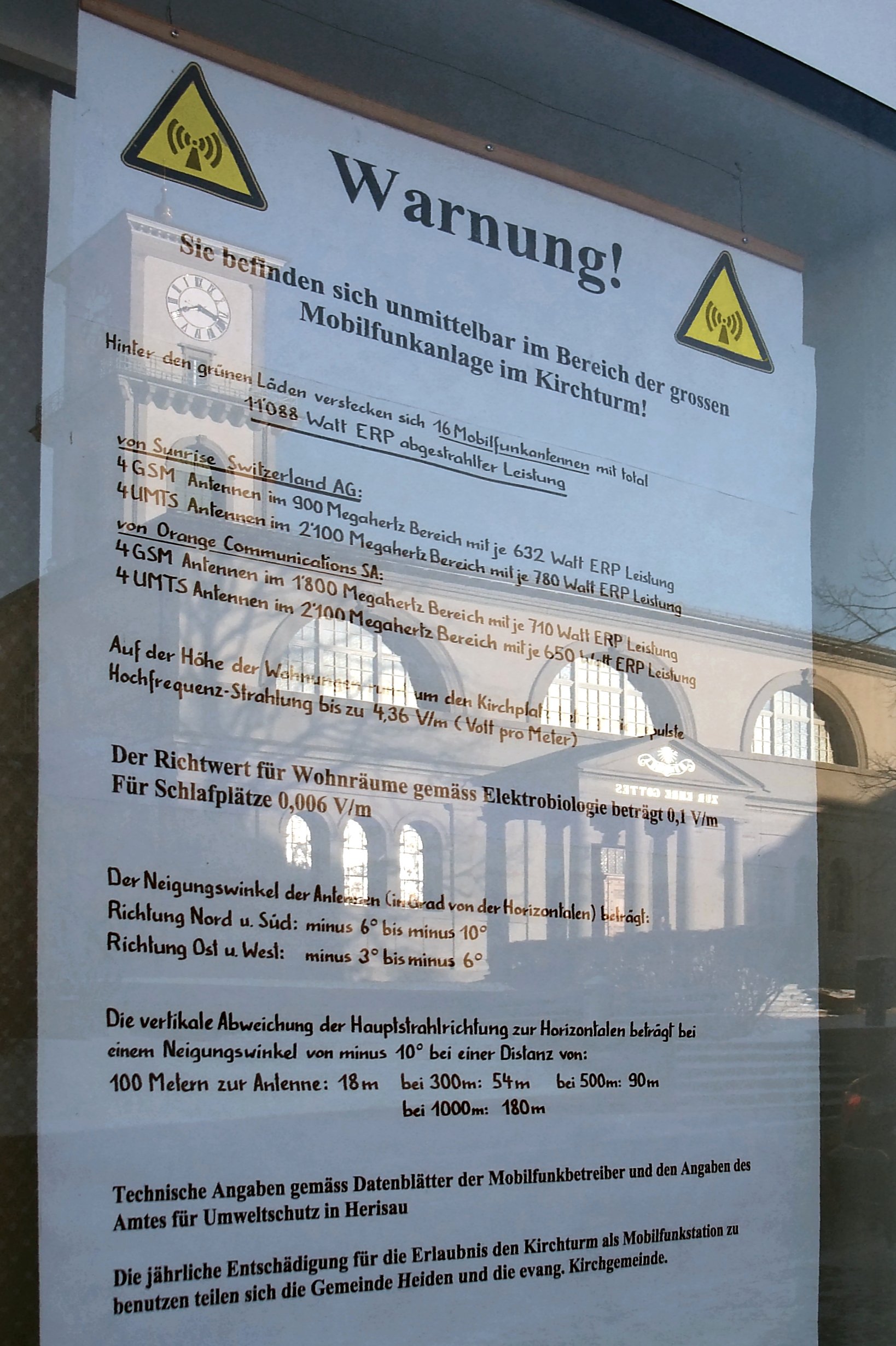
Warning sign about radiation from mobile phone systems, starting from the church tower in Heiden in the canton of Appenzell Ausserrhoden in Switzerland, which is reflected in the shop window, 2010.

The discussion about possible health risks from mobile phone radiation has been controversial to date, although there are currently no valid results. According to the German Federal Office for Radiation Protection

"there are still uncertainties in the risk assessment that could not be completely eliminated by the German Mobile Telecommunication Research Program, in particular possible health risks of long-term exposure to high-frequency electromagnetic fields from cell phone calls in adults (intensive cell phone use over more than 10 years) and the question of whether the use of cell phones by children could have an effect on health. For these reasons, the Federal Office for Radiation Protection still considers preventive health protection (precaution) to be necessary: exposure to electromagnetic fields should be kept as low as possible."

— Federal Office for Radiation Protection (as of March 24, 2017)

Warning of non-ionizing radiation in accordance with DIN EN ISO 7010

The German Federal Office for Radiation Protection recommends, among other things, mobile phones with a low SAR (Specific Absorption Rate) and the use of headsets or hands-free devices to keep the mobile phone away from the head. There is some discussion that mobile phone radiation may increase the incidence of acoustic neuroma, a benign tumor that arises from the vestibulocochlear nerve. It should therefore be reduced. In everyday life, a mobile phone transmits at maximum power only in exceptional cases. As soon as it is near a cell where maximum power is no longer needed, it is instructed by that cell to reduce its power. Electrosmog or cell phone radiation filters built into cell phones are supposed to protect against radiation. The effect is doubtful from the point of view of electromagnetic environmental compatibility, because the radiation intensity of the cell phone is increased disproportionately in order to obtain the necessary power. The same is true for use in a car without an external antenna, as the necessary radiation can only penetrate through the windows, or in areas with poor network coverage. Since 2004, radio network repeaters have been developed for mobile phone networks (GSM, UMTS, Tetrapol) that can amplify the reception of a mobile phone cell in shaded buildings. This reduces the SAR value of the mobile phone when making calls.

The SAR value of a WLAN router is only a tenth of that of a cell phone, although this drops by a further 80% at a distance of just one meter. The router can be set so that it switches off when not in use, for example at night.

==== Electric fields ====
===== High-voltage power lines =====
Until now, electrical energy has been transported from the power plant to the consumer almost exclusively via high-voltage lines, in which alternating current flows at a frequency of 50 Hertz. As part of the energy transition, high-voltage direct current (HVDC) transmission systems are also planned in Germany. Since the amendment of the 26th Federal Immission Control Ordinance (BImSchV) in 2013, emissions from HVDC systems are also regulated by law. The limit is set to prevent interference with electronic implants caused by static magnetic fields. No limit has been set for static electric fields.

===== Domestic electrical installation =====
Ground fault interrupters are available to reduce electric fields and (in the case of current flow) magnetic fields from residential electrical installations. In plaster installations, only a small part of the electric field can escape from the wall. However, a mains disconnect switch automatically disconnects the relevant line as long as no electrical load is switched on; as soon as a load is switched on, the mains voltage is also switched on. Ground fault interrupters were introduced in 1973 and have been continuously improved over the decades. In 1990, for example, it became possible to disconnect the PEN conductor (formerly known as the neutral conductor). Circuit breakers can be installed in several different circuits, preferably in those that supply bedrooms. However, they only turn off when no continuous current consumers such as air conditioners, fans, humidifiers, electric alarm clocks, night lights, standby devices, alarm systems, chargers, and similar devices are turned on. Instead of the mains voltage, a low voltage (2-12 volts) is applied, which can be used to detect when a consumer is switched on.

Rooms can also be shielded with copper wallpaper or special wall paints containing metal, thus applying the Faraday cage principle.

==== Body scanner ====
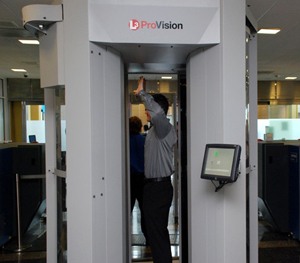
Body scanner

Since about 2005, body scanners have been used primarily at airports for security (passenger) screening. Passive scanners detect the natural radiation emitted by a person's body and use it to locate objects worn or concealed on the body. Active systems also use artificial radiation to improve detection by analyzing the backscatter. A distinction is made between body scanners that use ionizing radiation (usually X-rays) and those that use non-ionizing radiation (terahertz radiation).

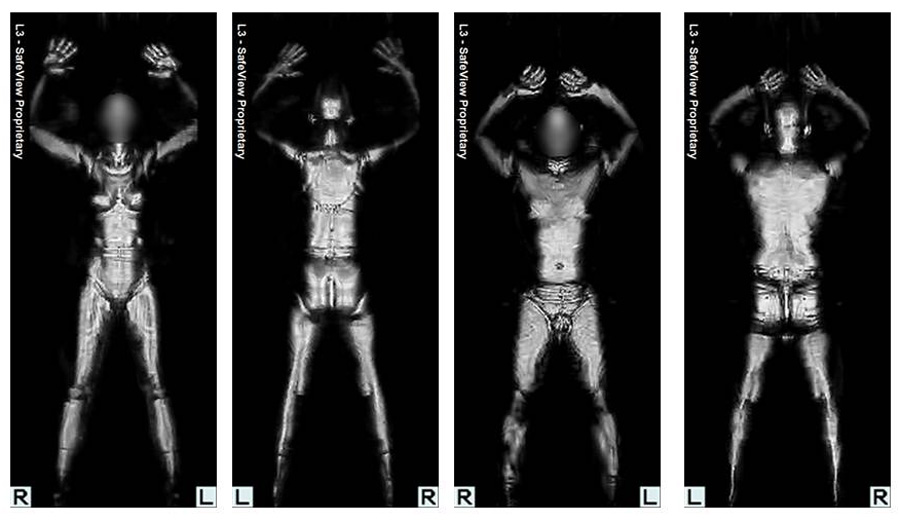
Images from a terahertz scanner

The integrated components operating in the lower terahertz range emit less than 1 mW (-3 dBm), so no health effects are expected. There are conflicting studies from 2009 on whether genetic damage can be detected as a result of terahertz radiation. In the U.S., backscatter x-ray scanners make up the majority of devices used. Scientists fear that a future increase in cancer could pose a greater threat to the life and limb of passengers than terrorism itself. It is not clear to the passenger whether the body scanners used during a particular checkpoint use only terahertz or also X-ray radiation.

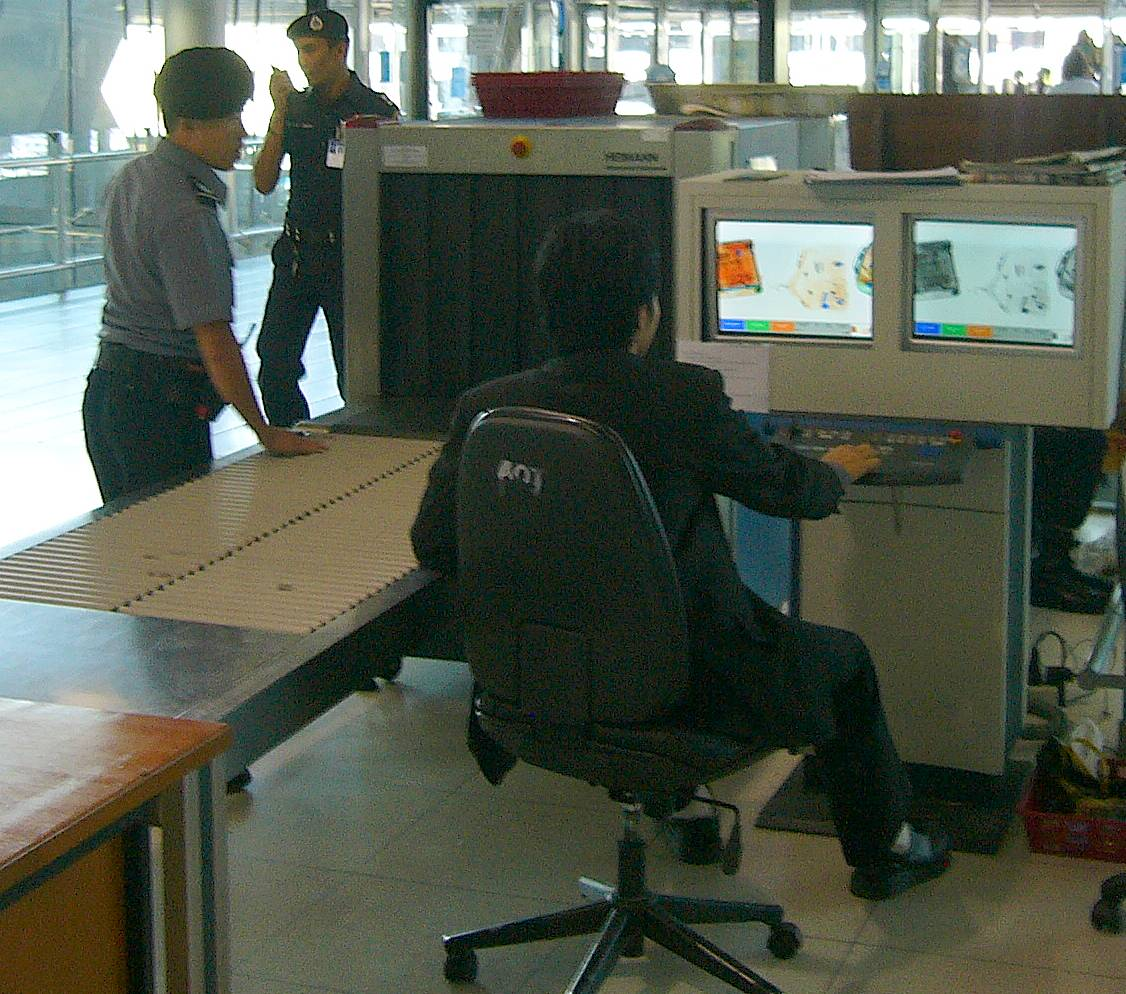
Scanner for hand luggage

According to the Federal Office for Radiation Protection, the few available results from investigations in the frequency range of active whole-body scanners that work with millimeter wave or terahertz radiation do not yet allow a conclusive assessment from a radiation protection perspective (as of 24 May 2017).

In the vicinity of the plant, where employees or other third parties may be present, the limit value of the permissible annual dose for a single person in the population of one millisievert (1 mSv, including pregnant women and children) is not exceeded, even in the case of permanent presence.

In the case of X-ray scanners for hand luggage, it is not necessary to set up a radiation protection area by Section §19 RöV, as the radiation exposure during a hand luggage check for passengers does not exceed 0.2 microsievert (μSv), even under unfavorable assumptions. For this reason, employees involved in baggage screening are not considered to be occupationally exposed to radiation in accordance with Section §31 X-ray Ordinance and therefore do not have to wear a dosimeter.

==== Radiation protection for electromedical treatment procedures ====
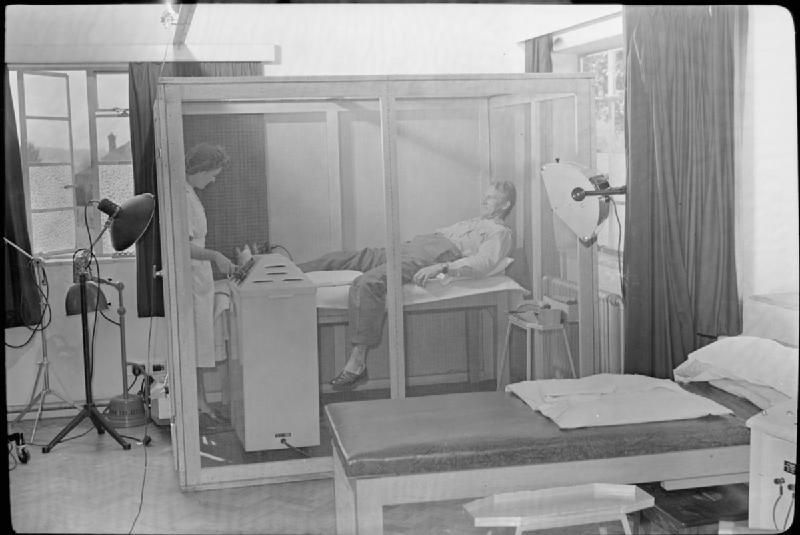
Short-wave diathermy (1944)

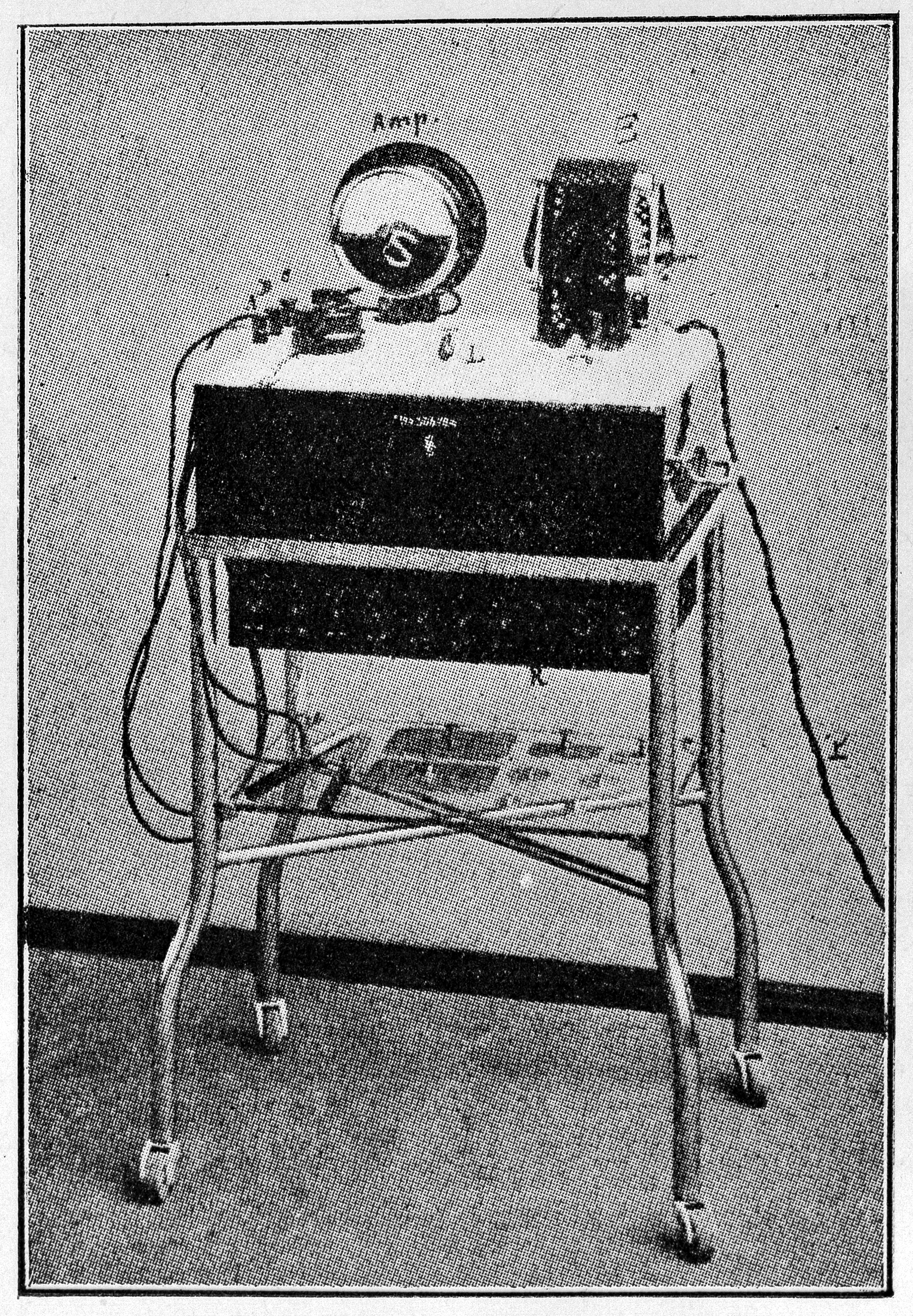
Long-wave diathermy device by the doctor and founder of diathermy Karl Franz Nagelschmidt, 1908

Electromagnetic alternating fields have been used in medicine since 1764, mainly for heating and increasing blood circulation (diathermy, short-wave therapy) to improve wound and bone healing. The relevant radiation protection is regulated by the Medical Devices Act together with the Medical Devices Operator Ordinance. The Medical Devices Act came into force in Germany on January 14, 1985. It divided the medical devices known at that time into groups according to their degree of risk to the patient. The Medical Devices Ordinance regulated the handling of medical devices until January 1, 2002, when it was replaced by the Medical Devices Act. When ionizing radiation is used in medicine, the benefit must outweigh the potential risk of tissue damage (justifiable indication). For this reason, radiation protection is of great importance. The design should be optimized according to the ALARA (As Low As Reasonably Achievable) principle as soon as an application is described as suitable. Since 1996, the European ALARA Network (EAN), founded by the European Commission, has been working on the further implementation of the ALARA principle in radiation protection.

=== Infrared radiation ===
Discovered around 1800 by the German-British astronomer, engineer and musician Friedrich Wilhelm Herschel (1738-1822), infrared radiation primarily produces heat. If the increase in body temperature and the duration of exposure exceed critical limits, heat damage and even heat stroke can result. Due to the still unsatisfactory data situation and the partly contradictory results, it is not yet possible to give clear recommendations for radiation protection with regard to infrared radiation. However, the findings regarding the acceleration of skin aging by infrared radiation are sufficient to describe the use of infrared radiation against wrinkles as counterproductive.

In 2011, the Institute for Occupational Safety and Health of the German Social Accident Insurance established exposure limit values to protect the skin from burns caused by thermal radiation. The IFA recommends that, in addition to the limit specified in EU Directive 2006/25/EC to protect the skin from burns for exposure times up to 10 seconds, a limit for exposure times between 10 and 1000 seconds should be applied. In addition, all radiation components in the wavelength range from 380 to 20000 nm should be considered for comparison with the limit values.

== Radiation protection regulations ==
=== First radiation protection regulations ===
A leaflet published by the German Radiological Society (DRG) in 1913 was the first systematic approach to radiation protection. The physicist and co-founder of the society, Bernhard Walter (1861-1950), was one of the pioneers of radiation protection.

The International Commission on Radiological Protection (ICRP) and the International Commission on Radiation Units and Measurements (ICRU) were established at the Second International Congress of Radiology in Stockholm in 1928. In the same year, the first international radiation protection recommendations were adopted and each country represented was asked to develop a coordinated radiation control program. The United States representative, Lauriston Taylor of the US Bureau of Standards (NSB), formed the Advisory Committee on X-Ray and Radium Protection, later renamed the National Committee on Radiation Protection and Measurements (NCRP). The NCRP received a Congressional charter in 1964 and continues to develop guidelines to protect individuals and the public from excessive radiation. In the years that followed, numerous other organizations were established by almost every president.

=== Radiation protection monitoring ===
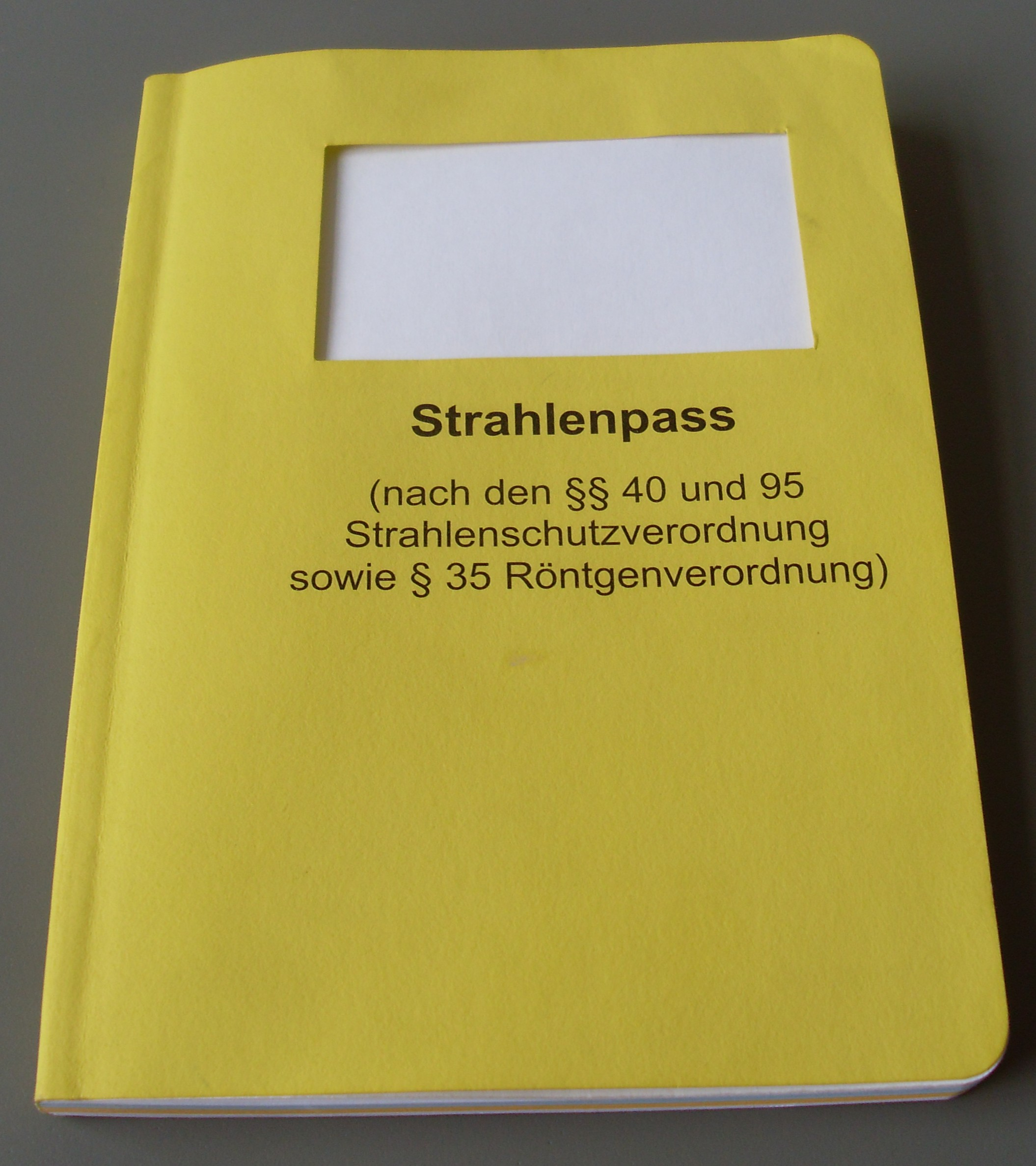
German radiation passport

Individuals in professions such as pilots, nuclear physicians, and nuclear power plant workers are regularly exposed to ionizing radiation. In Germany, over 400,000 workers undergo occupational radiation monitoring to safeguard against the harmful effects of radiation. Approximately 70,000 individuals employed across various industries possess a radiation pass (distinct from an X-ray pass - see below). Individuals who may receive an annual effective dose of more than 1 millisievert during their work are required to undergo radiation protection monitoring. In Germany, the effective dose from natural radiation is 2.1 millisieverts per year. Radiation dose is measured using dosimeters, and the occupational dose limit is 20 millisieverts per year. Monitoring also applies to buildings, plant components or (radioactive) substances. These are exempted from the scope of the Radiation Protection Ordinance by a special administrative act, the exemption in radiation protection. To this end, it must be ensured that the resulting radiation exposure for an individual member of the public does not exceed 10 μSv per calendar year and that the resulting collective dose does not exceed 1 person sievert per year.

=== Radiation protection register ===
According to § 170 StrlSchG [Radiation Protection Act] (in German) all occupationally exposed persons and holders of radiation passports require a radiation protection register number (SSR number or SSRN), a unique personal identification number, as of December 31, 2018. The SSR number facilitates and improves the allocation and balancing of individual dose values from occupational radiation exposure in the radiation protection register. It replaces the former radiation passport number. It is used to monitor dose limits. Companies are obliged to deploy their employees in such a way that the radiation dose to which they are exposed does not exceed the limit of 20 millisieverts per calendar year. In Germany, about 440,000 people were classified as occupationally exposed to radiation in 2016. According to § 145 StrlSchG [German Radiation Protection Act] (in German) paragraph 1, Sentence 1, "in the case of remediation and other measures to prevent and reduce exposure at radioactively contaminated sites, the person who carries out the measures himself or has them carried out by workers under his supervision must carry out an assessment of the body dose of the workers before starting the measures". Applications for SSR numbers must be submitted to the Federal Office for Radiation Protection (BfS) by March 31, 2019 for all employees currently under surveillance.

The application for the SSR number at the Federal Office and the transmission of the necessary data must be ensured following § 170 StrlSchG [German Radiation Protection Act] (in German) paragraph 4 sentence 4 by

- Radiation protection officer or by the
- responsible person in accordance with § 131

StrlSchG (in German) paragraph 1 or § 145 StrlSchG (in German) paragraph 1 sentence 1 or by

- the person responsible under

§ 115 StrlSchG (in German) paragraph 2 or § 153 StrlSchG (in German) paragraph 1. The SSR numbers must then be available for further use as part of normal communication with monitoring stations or radiation pass authorities. The SSR number is derived from the social security number and personal data using non-traceable encryption. The transmission takes place online. Approximately 420,00 persons are monitored for radiation protection in Germany (as of 2019).

Emergency responders (including volunteers) who are not occupationally exposed persons within the meaning of the Radiation Protection Act also require an SSR number retrospectively, i.e. after an operation in which they were exposed to radiation above the limits specified in the Radiation Protection Ordinance, as all relevant exposures must be recorded in the Radiation Protection Register.

=== Radiation protection areas ===
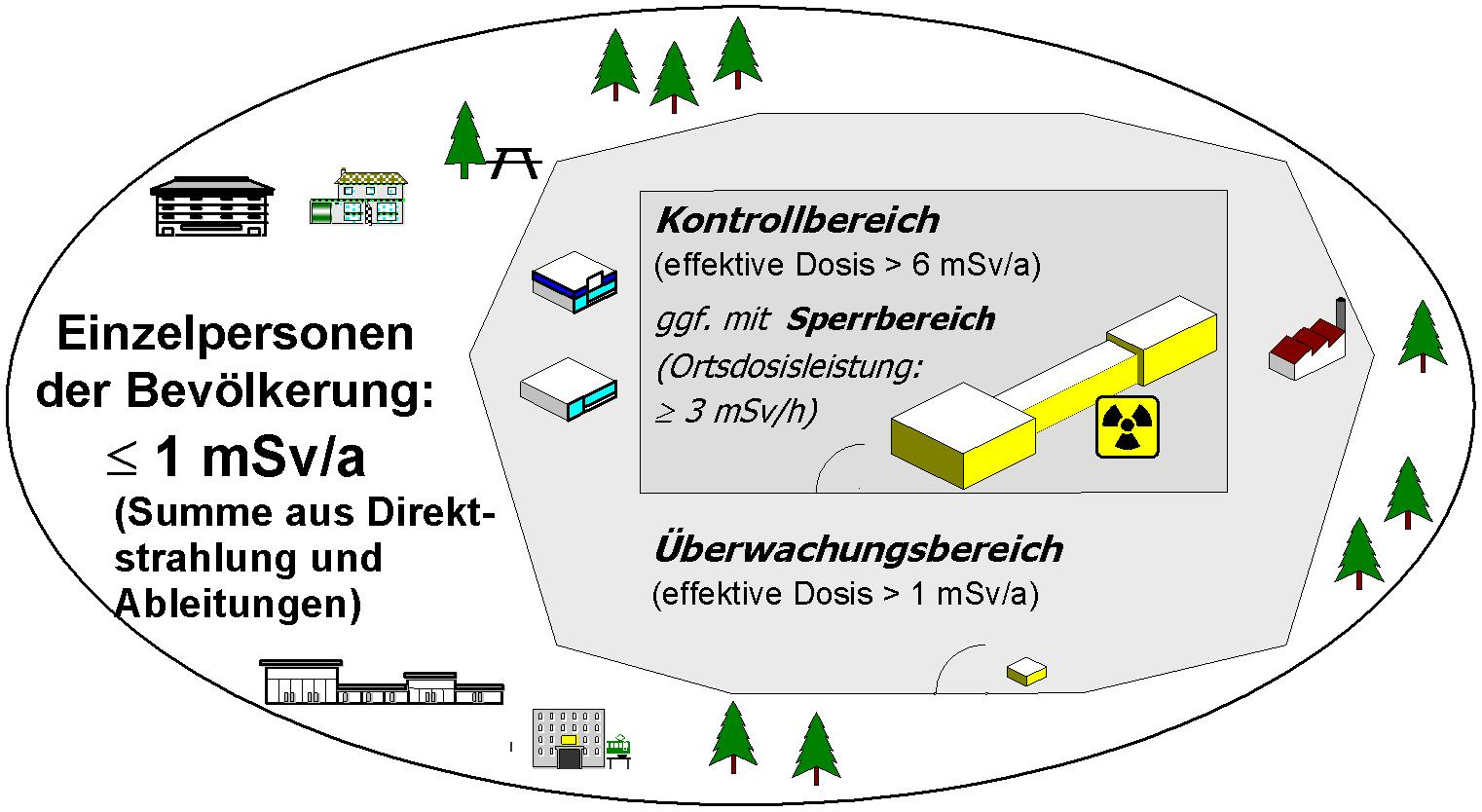
Radiation protection areas

Radiation protection areas are spatial areas in which either people can receive certain body doses during their stay or in which a certain local dose rate is exceeded. They are defined in § 36 of the Radiation Protection Ordinance and in §§ 19 and 20 of the X-Ray Ordinance. According to the Radiation Protection Ordinance, radiation protection areas are divided into restricted areas (local dose rate ≥ 3 mSv/hour), control areas (effective dose > 6 mSv/year) and monitoring areas (effective dose > 1 mSv/year), depending on the hazard.

== Radiological emergency response projects ==
=== Early warning systems ===
Germany, Austria and Switzerland, among many other countries, have early warning systems in place to protect the population.

The local dose rate measurement network (ODL measurement network) is a measurement system for radioactivity operated by the German Federal Office for Radiation Protection, which determines the local dose rate at the measurement site.

In Austria, the Radiation Early Warning System is a measurement and reporting system established in the late 1970s to provide early detection of elevated levels of ionizing radiation in the country and to enable the necessary measures to be taken. The readings are automatically sent to the central office at the Ministry, where they can be accessed by the relevant departments, such as the Federal Warning Center or the warning centers of the federal states.

NADAM (Network for Automatic Dose Alerting and Measurement) is the gamma radiation monitoring network of the Swiss National Emergency Operations Center. The monitoring network is complemented by the MADUK stations (Monitoring Network for Automatic Dose Rate Monitoring in the Environment of Nuclear Power Plants) of the Swiss Federal Nuclear Safety Inspectorate (ENSI).

=== Project NERIS-TP ===
In 2011-2014, the NERIS-TP project aimed to discuss the lessons learned from the European EURANOS project on nuclear emergency response with all relevant stakeholders.

=== Project PREPARE ===
The European PREPARE project aims to fill gaps in nuclear and radiological emergency preparedness identified after the Fukushima accident. The project aims to review emergency response concepts for long-lived releases, to address issues of measurement methods and food safety in the case of transboundary contamination, and to fill gaps in decision support systems (source term reconstruction, improved dispersion modeling, consideration of aquatic dispersion pathways in European river systems).

=== Project IMIS ===
Environmental radioactivity has been monitored in Germany since the 1950s. Until 1986, this was carried out by various authorities that did not coordinate with each other. Following the confusion during the Chernobyl reactor disaster in April 1986, measurement activities were pooled in the IMIS (Integrated Measurement and Information System) project, an environmental information system for monitoring radioactivity in Germany. Previously, the measuring equipment was affiliated to the warning offices under the name WADIS ("Warning service information system").

=== Project CONCERT ===
The aim of the CONCERT (European Joint Programme for the Integration of Radiation Protection Research) project is to establish a joint European program for radiation protection research in Europe in 2018, based on the current strategic research programs of the European research platforms MELODI (radiation effects and radiation risks), ALLIANCE (radioecology), NERIS (nuclear and radiological emergency response), EURADOS (radiation dosimetry) and EURAMED (medical radiation protection).

=== Project REWARD ===
The REWARD (Real time wide area radiation surveillance system) project was established to address the threats of nuclear terrorism, missing radioactive sources, radioactive contamination and nuclear accidents. The consortium developed a mobile system for real time wide area radiation monitoring based on the integration of new miniaturized solid state sensors. Two sensors are used: a cadmium zinc telluride (CdZnTe) detector for gamma radiation and a high efficiency neutron detector based on novel silicon technologies. The gamma and neutron detectors are integrated into a single monitoring device called a tag. The sensor unit includes a wireless communication interface to remotely transmit data to a monitoring base station, which also uses a GPS system to calculate the tag's position.

=== Task force for all types of nuclear emergencies ===
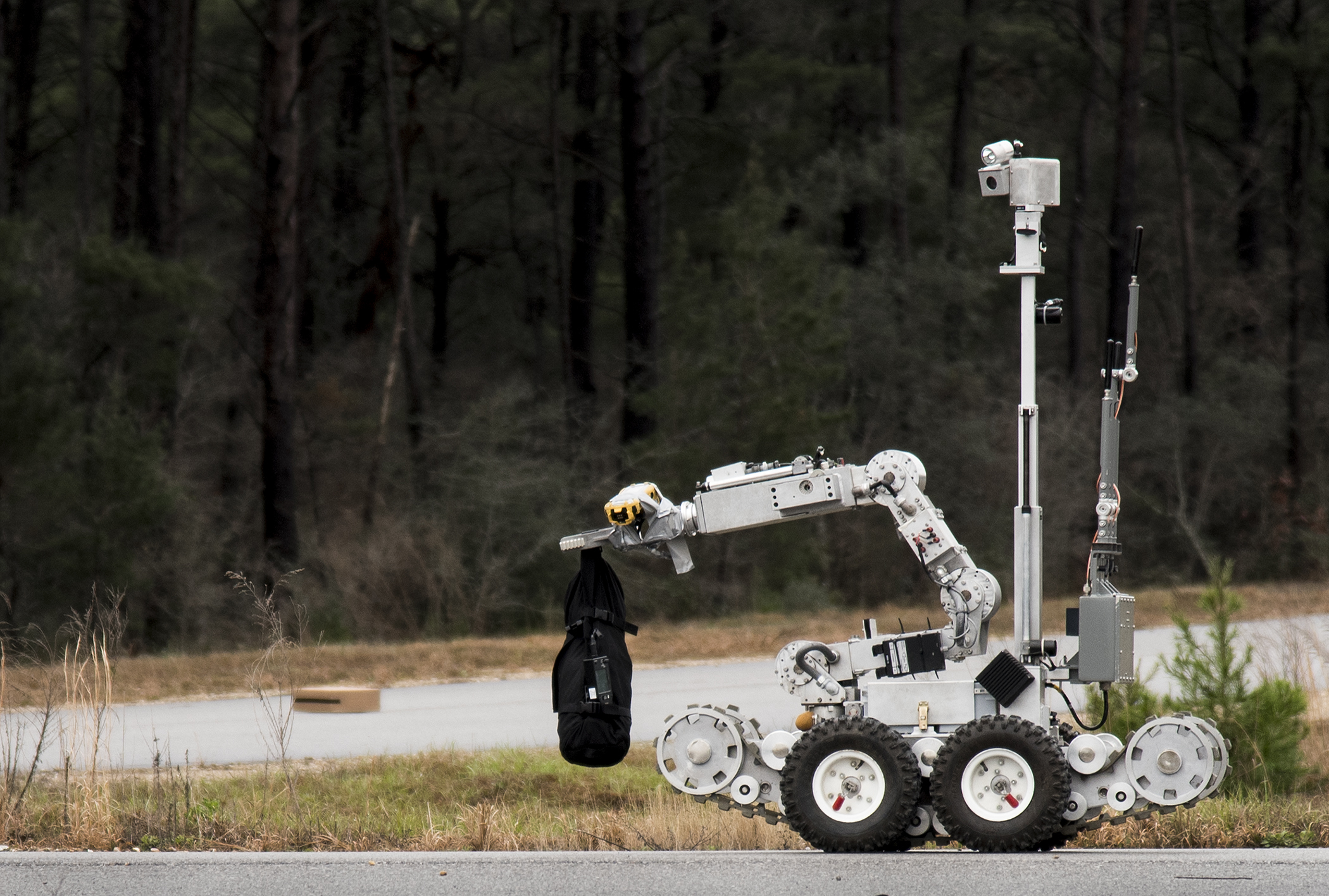
Remote-controlled robots with high-purity germanium detectors (high-purity single crystal) are used to identify radioactive substances.

The Nuclear Emergency Support Team (NEST) is a US program for all types of nuclear emergencies of the National Nuclear Security Administration (NNSA) of the United States Department of Energy and is also a counter-terrorism unit that responds to incidents involving radioactive materials or nuclear weapons in US possession abroad. It was founded in 1974/75 under US President Gerald Ford and renamed the Nuclear Emergency Support Team in 2002. In 1988, a secret agreement from 1976 between the USA and the Federal Republic of Germany became known, which stipulates the deployment of NEST in the Federal Republic. In Germany, a similar unit has existed since 2003 with the name Central Federal Support Group for Serious Cases of Nuclear-Specific Emergency Response (ZUB).

== Legal basis ==
As early as 1905, the Frenchman Viktor Hennecart called for special legislation to regulate the use of X-rays. In England, Sidney Russ (1879-1963) suggested to the British Roentgen Society in 1915 that it should develop its own set of safety standards, which it did in July 1921 with the formation of the British X-Ray and Radium Protection Committee. In the United States, the American X-Ray Society developed its own guidelines in 1922. In the German Reich, a special committee of the German X-Ray Society under Franz Maximilian Groedel (1881-1951), Hans Liniger (1863-1933) and Heinz Lossen (1893-1967) formulated the first guidelines after the First World War. In 1953, the employers' liability insurance associations issued the accident prevention regulation "Use of X-rays in medical facilities" based on the legal basis in § 848a of the Reich Insurance Code (RVG). In the GDR, the Occupational Safety and Health Regulation (ASAO) 950 was in effect from 1954 to 1971. It was replaced by ASAO 980 on April 1, 1971.

=== EURATOM ===
The European Atomic Energy Community (EURATOM) was founded on March 25, 1957, by the Treaty of Rome between France, Italy, the Benelux countries and the Federal Republic of Germany, and remains almost unchanged to this day. Chapter 3 of the Euratom Treaty regulates measures to protect the health of the population. Article 35 requires facilities for the continuous monitoring of soil, air and water for radioactivity. As a result, monitoring networks have been set up in all Member States and the data collected is sent to the EU's central database (EURDEP, European Radiological Data Exchange Platform). The platform is part of the EU's ECURIE system for the exchange of information in the event of radiological emergencies and became operational in 1995. Switzerland also participates in this information system.

=== Legal basis in Germany ===
In Germany, the first X-ray regulation (RGBl. I p. 88) was issued in 1941 and originally applied to non-medical companies. The first medical regulations were issued in October 1953 by the Main Association of Industrial Employer's Liability Insurance Associations as accident prevention regulations for the Reich Insurance Code. Basic standards for radiation protection were introduced by directives of the European Atomic Energy Community (EURATOM) on February 2, 1959. The Atomic Energy Act of December 23, 1959 is the national legal basis for all radiation protection legislation in the Federal Republic of Germany (West) with the Radiation Protection Ordinance of June 24, 1960 (only for radioactive substances), the Radiation Protection Ordinance of July 18, 1964 (for the medical sector) and the X-ray Ordinance of March 1, 1973. Radiation protection was formulated in § 1, according to which life, health and property are to be protected from the dangers of nuclear energy and the harmful effects of ionizing radiation and damage caused by nuclear energy or ionizing radiation is to be compensated. The Radiation Protection Ordinance sets dose limits for the general population and for occupationally exposed persons. In general, any use of ionizing radiation must be justified and radiation exposure must be kept as low as possible even below the limit values. To this end, physicians, dentists and veterinarians, for example, must provide proof every five years - by Section 18a (2) X-ray Ordinance. in the version dated April 30, 2003 - that their specialist knowledge in radiation protection has been updated and must complete a full-day course with a final examination. Specialist knowledge in radiation protection is required by the Technical Knowledge Guideline according to X-ray Ordinance. - R3 for persons who work with baggage screening equipment, industrial measuring equipment and interfering emitters. Since 2019, the regulatory areas of the previous X-ray and radiation protection ordinances have been merged in the amended Radiation Protection Ordinance.

The Radiation Protection Commission (SSK) was founded in 1974 as an advisory body to the Federal Ministry of the Interior. It emerged from Commission IV "Radiation Protection" of the German Atomic Energy Commission, which was founded on January 26, 1956. After the Chernobyl nuclear disaster in 1986, the Federal Ministry for the Environment, Nature Conservation, Nuclear Safety and Consumer Protection was established in the Federal Republic of Germany. The creation of this ministry was primarily a response to the perceived lack of coordination in the political response to the Chernobyl disaster and its aftermath. On December 11, 1986, the German Bundestag passed the Precautionary Radiation Protection Act (StrVG) to protect the population, to monitor radioactivity in the environment, and to minimize human exposure to radiation and radioactive contamination of the environment in the event of radioactive accidents or incidents. The last revision of the X-Ray Ordinance was issued on January 8, 1987. As part of a comprehensive modernization of German radiation protection law, which is largely based on Directive 2013/59/Euratom, the provisions of the X-Ray Ordinance have been incorporated into the revised Radiation Protection Ordinance.

Among many other measures, contaminated food was withdrawn from the market on a large scale. Parents were strongly advised not to let their children play in sandboxes. Some of the contaminated sand was replaced. In 1989, the Federal Office for Radiation Protection was incorporated into the Ministry of the Environment. On April 30, 2003, a new precautionary radiation protection law was promulgated to implement two EU directives on the health protection of persons against the dangers of ionizing radiation during medical exposure. The protection of workers from optical radiation (infrared radiation (IR), visible light (VIS) and ultraviolet radiation (UV)), which falls under the category of non-ionizing radiation, is regulated by the Ordinance on the Protection of Workers from Artificial Optical Radiation of 19 July 2010. It is based on the EU Directive 2006/25/EC of April 27, 2006. On March 1, 2010, the "Act on the Protection of Humans from Non-Ionizing Radiation" (NiSG), BGBl. I p. 2433, came into force, according to which the use of sunbeds by minors has been prohibited since August 4, 2009, in accordance with § 4 NiSG [Network and Information Systems Security Ordinance – NIS Ordinance] (in German) A new Radiation Protection Act came into force in Germany on October 1, 2017.

In Germany, a radiation protection officer directs and supervises activities to ensure radiation protection when handling radioactive materials or ionizing radiation. Their duties are described in § 31-33 StrlSchV (in German) of the Radiation Protection Ordinance and § 13-15 RöV (in German) of the X-Ray Ordinance. They are appointed by the radiation protection officer, who is responsible for ensuring that all radiation protection regulations are observed.

==== X-ray passport ====
Since 2002, an x-ray pass is a document in which the examining physician or dentist must enter information about the x-ray examinations performed on the patient. The main aim was to avoid unnecessary repeat examinations. According to the new Radiation Protection Ordinance (StrlSchV), practices and clinics are no longer obliged to offer their patients X-ray passports and to enter examinations in them. The Radiation Protection Ordinance came into force on December 31, 2018, together with the Radiation Protection Act (StrlSchG) passed in 2017, replacing the previous Radiation Protection Ordinance and the X-ray Ordinance. The Federal Office for Radiation Protection (BfS) continues to advise patients to keep records of their own radiation diagnostic examinations. On its website, the BfS provides a downloadable document that can be used for personal documentation.

=== Legal basis in Switzerland ===
In Switzerland, institutionalized radiation protection began in 1955 with the issuance of guidelines for protection against ionizing radiation in medicine, laboratories, industry and manufacturing plants, although these were only recommendations. The legal basis was created by a new constitutional article (Art. 24), according to which the federal government issues regulations on protection against the dangers of ionizing radiation. On this basis, a corresponding federal law entered into force on July 1, 1960. The first Swiss ordinance on radiation protection entered into force on May 1, 1963. On October 7, 1963, the Federal Department of Home Affairs (EDI) issued the following decrees to supplement the ordinance:

- on radiation protection in medical X-ray equipment
- on radiation protection in shoe X-ray machines (of which about 850 were in operation in 1963; the last one was not decommissioned until 1990)
- on the radioactivity of luminous dials.

Another 40 regulations followed. The monitoring of such facilities took many years due to a lack of personnel. From 1963, dosimeters were to be used for personal protection, but this met with great resistance. It was not until 1989 that an updated radiation protection law was passed, accompanied by radiation protection training for the people concerned.

=== Legal basis in Austria ===
The legal basis for radiation protection in Austria is the Radiation Protection Act (BGBl. 277/69 as amended) of June 11, 1969. The tasks of radiation protection extend to the fields of medicine, commerce and industry, research, schools, worker protection and food. The General Radiation Protection Ordinance, Federal Law Gazette II No. 191/2006, has been in force since June 1, 2006. Based on the Radiation Protection Act, it regulates the handling of radiation sources and measures for protection against ionizing radiation. The Optical Radiation Ordinance (VOPST) is a detailed ordinance to the Occupational Safety and Health Act (ASchG).

On August 1, 2020, a new radiation protection law came into force, which largely harmonized the radiation protection regulations for artificial radioactive substances and terrestrial natural radioactive substances. They are now enshrined in the General Radiation Protection Ordinance 2020. Companies that carry out activities with naturally occurring radioactive substances are now subject to the licensing or notification requirements pursuant to Sections 15 to 17 of the Radiation Protection Act 2020, unless an exemption provision pursuant to Sections 7 or 8 of the General Radiation Protection Ordinance 2020 applies. Cement production including maintenance of clinker kilns, production of primary iron and tin, lead and copper smelting are included in the scope. If a company falls within the scope of the General Radiation Protection Ordinance 2020, its owner must commission an officially authorized monitoring body. The mandate includes dose assessment for workers who may be exposed to increased radiation exposure and, if necessary, determination of the activity concentration of residues and radioactive substances discharged with the air or waste water.

== See also ==
- List of civilian nuclear accidents

== Bibliography ==
- J. Samuel Walker (November 1, 2000). Permissible Dose: A History of Radiation Protection in the Twentieth Century. University of California Press. ISBN 978-0-520-92484-0. Limited preview in Google Books.
- K. N. Govinda Rajan (July 28, 2017). Radiation Safety in Radiation Oncology. CRC Press. ISBN 978-1-4987-6226-7. Limited preview in Google Books.
- Strahlengefahrdung und Strahlenschutz / Radiation Exposure and Radiation Protection. Springer-Publisher. March 13, 2013. ISBN 978-3-642-82229-2. Limited preview in Google Books
- J. Samuel Walker (April 2001). Short History of Nuclear Regulation, 1946–1999. DIANE Publishing. ISBN 978-0-7567-0929-7.Limited preview in Google Books.
- Ashley W. Oughterson, Shields Warren: Medical Effects of the Atomic Bomb in Japan. Volume VIII.8 aus der National Nuclear Energy Series zum Manhattan Project, McGraw-Hill Book Company, 1956.
- Carl Voegtlin, Harold C. Hodge: Pharmacology and Toxicology of Uranium Compounds. Volume VI.1, Part I and Part II (with a Section on the Pharmacology and Toxicology of Fluorine and Hydrogen Fluoride) from the National Nuclear Energy Series to the Manhattan Project, McGraw-Hill Book Company, 1949.
- Henry DeWolf Smyth (written on the request of Maj. Gen. L. R. Groves): Atomic Energy for Military Purposes. The official report on the development of the atomic bomb under the auspices of the United States Government, 1940–1945. Princeton University Press, 1946.
- James E. Grindler (Argonne National Laboratory): The Radiochemistry of Uranium. Nuclear Science Series, National Research Council, NAS-NS 3050, undated.
