= History of radiation therapy =

The history of radiation therapy or radiotherapy can be traced back to experiments made soon after the discovery of X-rays (1895), when it was shown that exposure to radiation produced cutaneous burns. Influenced by electrotherapy and escharotics—the medical application of caustic substances—doctors began using radiation to treat growths and lesions produced by diseases such as lupus, basal cell carcinoma, and epithelioma. Radiation was generally believed to have bactericidal properties, so when radium was discovered, in addition to treatments similar to those used with x-rays, it was also used as an additive to medical treatments for diseases such as tuberculosis where there were resistant bacilli.

Additionally, because radiation was found to exist in hot spring waters which were reputed for their curative powers, it was marketed as a wonder cure for all sorts of ailments in patent medicine and quack cures. It was believed by medical science that small doses of radiation would cause no harm and the harmful effects of large doses were temporary.

The widespread use of radium in medicine ended when it was discovered that physical tolerance was lower than expected and exposure caused long term cell damage that could appear in carcinoma up to 40 years after treatment. The use of radiation continues today as a treatment for cancer in radiation therapy.

== Early development of radiotherapy (1895–1905) ==
The imaging properties of x-rays were discovered, their practical uses for research and diagnostics were immediately apparent, and soon their use spread in the medical field. X-rays were used to diagnose bone fractures, heart disease, and phthisis. Inventive procedures for different diagnostic purposes were created, such as filling digestive cavities with bismuth, which allowed them to be seen through tissue and bone.

=== Discovery of the therapeutic potential of radiation ===
During early practical work and scientific investigation, experimenters noticed that prolonged exposure to x-rays created inflammation and, more rarely, tissue damage on the skin. The biological effect attracted the interest of Léopold Freund and Eduard Schiff, who, only a month or two after Röntgen's announcement, suggested they be used in the treatment of disease. At approximately the same time, Emil Grubbe, of Chicago was possibly the first American physician to use x-rays to treat cancer, beginning in 1896, began experimenting in Chicago with medical uses of x-rays. Escharotics by this time had already been used to treat skin malignancies through caustic burns, and electrotherapy had also been experimented with, in the aim to stimulate the skin tissue.

The first attempted x-ray treatment was by Victor Despeignes, a French physician who used them on a patient with stomach cancer. In 1896, he published a paper with the results: a week-long treatment was followed by a diminution of pain and reduction in the size of the tumor, though the case was ultimately fatal. The results were inconclusive, because the patient was concurrently being given other treatments. Freund's first experiment was a tragic failure; he applied x-rays to a naevus in order to induce epilation and a deep ulcer resulted, which resisted further treatment by radiation. The first successful treatment was by Schiff, working with Freund, in a case of lupus vulgaris. A year later, in 1897, the two published a report of their success and this provoked further experimentation in x-ray therapies. Thereafter they did a successful treatment of lupus erythematosus in 1898. The lesion took a common form of a 'butterfly-patch' which appeared on both sides of the face, and Schiff applied the irradiation to one side only, in order to compare the effects.

Within a few months, scientific journals were swamped with accounts of the successful treatment of different types of skin tissue malignancies with x-rays. In Sweden, Thor Stenbeck published results of the first successful treatments of rodent ulcer and epithelioma in 1899, later that year confirmed by Tage Sjögren. Soon afterwards, their findings were confirmed by a number of other physicians.

The nature of the active agent in therapeutic treatment was still unknown, and subject to wide dispute. Freund and Schiff believed the activity was due to electrical discharge, Nikola Tesla argued it was because of the ozone generated by the x-rays, while others argued that it was the x-rays themselves. Tesla's position was soon refuted, and only the other two theories remained. In 1900, Robert Kienböck produced a study based on a series of experiments that demonstrated that it was the x-rays themselves. Studies published in 1899 and 1900 suggested that the rays varied in penetration according to the degree of vacuum in the tube.

=== Niels Finsen and phototherapy ===
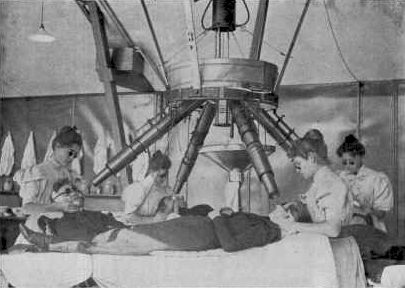
The Finsen hospital lamp, 1900. The projecting tubes can be adjusted so as to permit the focusing of the light, which is directed through a hollow lens that is kept pressed down upon the part under treatment. The nurses and patients are wearing dark glasses to protect the eyes from the light.

Niels Finsen, a Faroese-Danish physician, had by that time already pursued interest in the biological effects of light. He published a paper, Om Lysets Indvirkninger paa Huden ("On the effects of light on the skin") in 1893. Inspired by the discovery that x-rays could have therapeutic effects, he extended his research to examine directed light rays. In 1896, he published a paper on his findings, Om Anvendelse i Medicinen af koncentrerede kemiske Lysstraaler ("The use of concentrated chemical light rays in medicine"). Finsen discovered that lupus was amenable to treatment by ultraviolet rays when separated out by a system of quartz crystals, and thereafter created a lamp to sift out the rays. The so-called Finsen lamp became widely used in for phototherapy, and derivatives of it became used when experimenting with other types of radiotherapy. Modifications were made to Finsen's original design, and it found its most common forms in the Finsen-Reyn lamp and Finsen-Lomholt lamp .

By 1905, it was estimated that fully 50 percent of the cases of lupus were successfully healed by Finsen's methods. Finsen was soon awarded a Nobel Prize for his research.

=== Röntgenotherapy ===
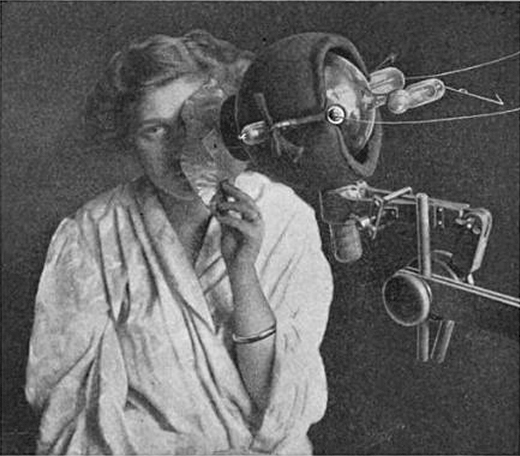
X-ray apparatus used for treatment of epithelioma of the face, 1915. The tube is in a localizing shield, and a perforated sheet of metal is securely fashioned to the surface by adhesive plaster.

From initial therapeutic experiments, a new field of x-ray therapy was born, referred to as röntgenotherapy after Wilhelm Röntgen, the discoverer of x-rays. It was still unclear how the x-rays acted on the skin; however, it was generally agreed upon that the area affected was killed and either discharged or absorbed.

By 1900, there were four well established classes of problems that were treated by x-ray, based on a set of five classes initially outlined by Freund: 1. in hypertrichosis, for the removal of unwanted hair; 2. in the treatment of disease of hair and hair follicles in which it was necessary to remove hair; 3. in the treatment of inflammatory affections on the skin like eczema and acne; 4. and in the treatment of malignant affections on the skin in cases like lupus and epithelioma.

Additionally, x-rays were successfully applied to other appearances of carcinoma, trials were done in treating leukemia, and because of the supposed bactericidal properties, there were suggestions it could be used in diseases such as tuberculosis. Experiments were also done using x-rays to treat epilepsy, which had previously also experimentally been treated with electrical currents.

== Further development and the use of radium (1905–1915) ==
Because of the excitement over the new treatment, literature about the therapeutic effects of x-rays often exaggerated the propensity to cure different diseases. Reports of the fact that in some cases treatment worsened some of the patients' conditions were ignored in favor of hopeful optimism. Henry G. Piffard referred to these practitioners as "radiomaniacs" and "radiografters". It was found that x-rays were only capable of producing a cure in certain cases of the basal cell type of epithelioma and exceedingly unreliable in malignant cancer, not making it a suitable replacement for surgery. In many cases of treatment, the cancer recurred after a period of time. X-ray experiments in pulmonary tuberculosis proved useless. Aside from the medical profession losing faith in the ability of x-ray therapy, the public increasingly viewed it as a dangerous type of treatment. This resulted in a period of pessimism about the use of x-rays, which lasted from about 1905 to 1910 or 1912.

=== Radium therapy ===
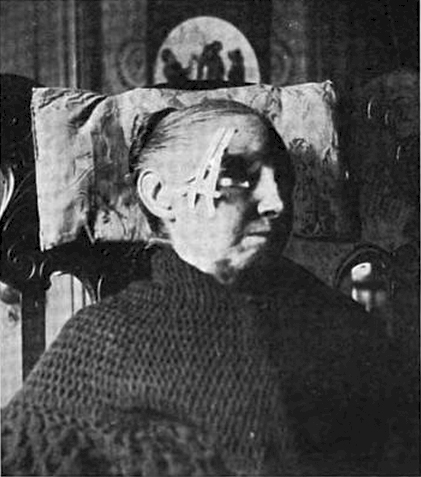
Small tubes containing radium salts are strapped to a woman's face to treat what was either lupus or rodent ulcer, 1905.

Soon after the discovery of radium in 1898 by Marie Curie and her husband, Pierre, there was speculation in whether the radiation could be used for therapy in the same way as that from x-rays. The physiological effect of radium was first observed in 1900 by Otto Walkhoff, and later confirmed by what famously known as the "Becquerel burn". In 1901, Henri Becquerel had placed a tube of radium in a waistcoat pocket where it had remained for several hours; a week or two after which there was severe inflammation of his skin underneath where the radium had been kept. Ernest Besnier, a dermatologist, examined the skin and expressed the opinion that it was due to the radium, leading to experiments by Curie which confirmed it. Besnier suggested the use of radium for therapy along the same purposes as x-rays and ultraviolet rays.

Becquerel for this purpose loaned some radium to Henri-Alexandre Danlos of the hôpital St. Louis in Paris in 1901. Danlos successfully treated a few cases of lupus with an admixture of radium and barium chloride. Further trials of radium therapy began, though at a much slower pace than did those using x-rays because radium was expensive and difficult to obtain.

==== Methods of application ====
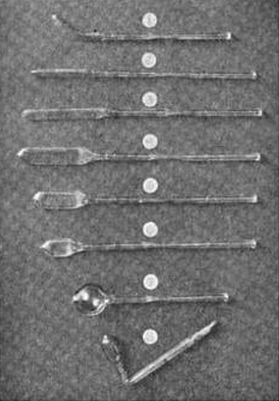
Glass applicators for radium emanation, 1918

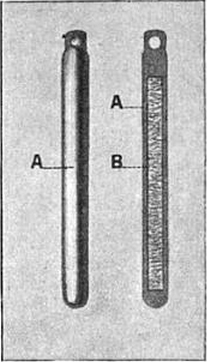
Illustration showing a tube for applying radium salts, 1918

Radium was soon seen as a way to treat disorders that were not affected enough by x-ray treatment because it could be applied in a multitude of ways in which x-rays could not. Different methods of applying radium had been tested, which fell into two categories: the use of radium emanation (now referred to as radon), and the use of radium salts.

One method using emanation was through inhalation, where it was mixed with air. Radium inhalation had been most studied in Germany, where regular inhalation institutes were established, and the goal was to target the lungs. That was done either to treat lung diseases, like tuberculosis, or to be absorbed through the surface of the lung to the blood, where it could circulate through the body. It was claimed that the beneficial effects produced by radium water baths were the result of inhalation of the vapors.

Another method of treatment was to condense the emanation at liquid air temperature on substances such as vasoline, glycerine, and lanoline, to apply externally to the part affected; or on quinine, bismuth, subnitrate, and arsenic, to be consumed or applied internally.

Radium emanation was also passed into glass or metal tubes or flat glass-tight applicators and applied in the same way as radium tubes. In other cases was also deposited on metal points or flat surfaces of metal using electrical devices, which had the same level of radioactivity as the parent radium, but lasted a shorter duration. One way of treatment was to then drive the deposits of radioactive material into tissue using galvanic current. It was also a method of applying radium emanation to a specially designed applicator constructed to suit the needs of the patient, who could later take it home.

Dilute solutions of radium salts were also made, meant to be used internally. Patients would be prescribed regular dosages. More rarely, the salts were also suspended in liquids to be injected in subcutaneous treatments, which could be applied locally to affected tissues. That was considered the most expensive method, because the radium used was irreparably lost.

As with radium emanation, solutions of free radium salts were also placed in tubes; in this case, the tubes were made from platinum. In metal tubes, the radium could be employed in a number of ways: externally; to the interior of the body in places like the mouth, nose, esophagus, rectum and vagina; and into the substance of a tumor through incisions.

==== Radium baths ====
In 1903, the discoverer of the electron, J. J. Thomson, wrote a letter to the journal Nature in which he detailed his discovery of the presence of radioactivity in well water. Soon after, others found that the waters in many of the world's most famous health springs were also radioactive. This radioactivity is due to the presence of radium emanation produced by the radium that is present in the ground through which the waters flow. In 1904, Nature published a study on the natural radioactivity of different mineral waters.

Inspired by this, using preparations of radium salts in bath water was suggested as a way for patients to be treated at home, as the radio-activity in the bathwater was permanent. Radium baths became used experimentally to treat arthritis, gout, and neuralgias.

=== Röntgenotherapy vs. radium therapy ===
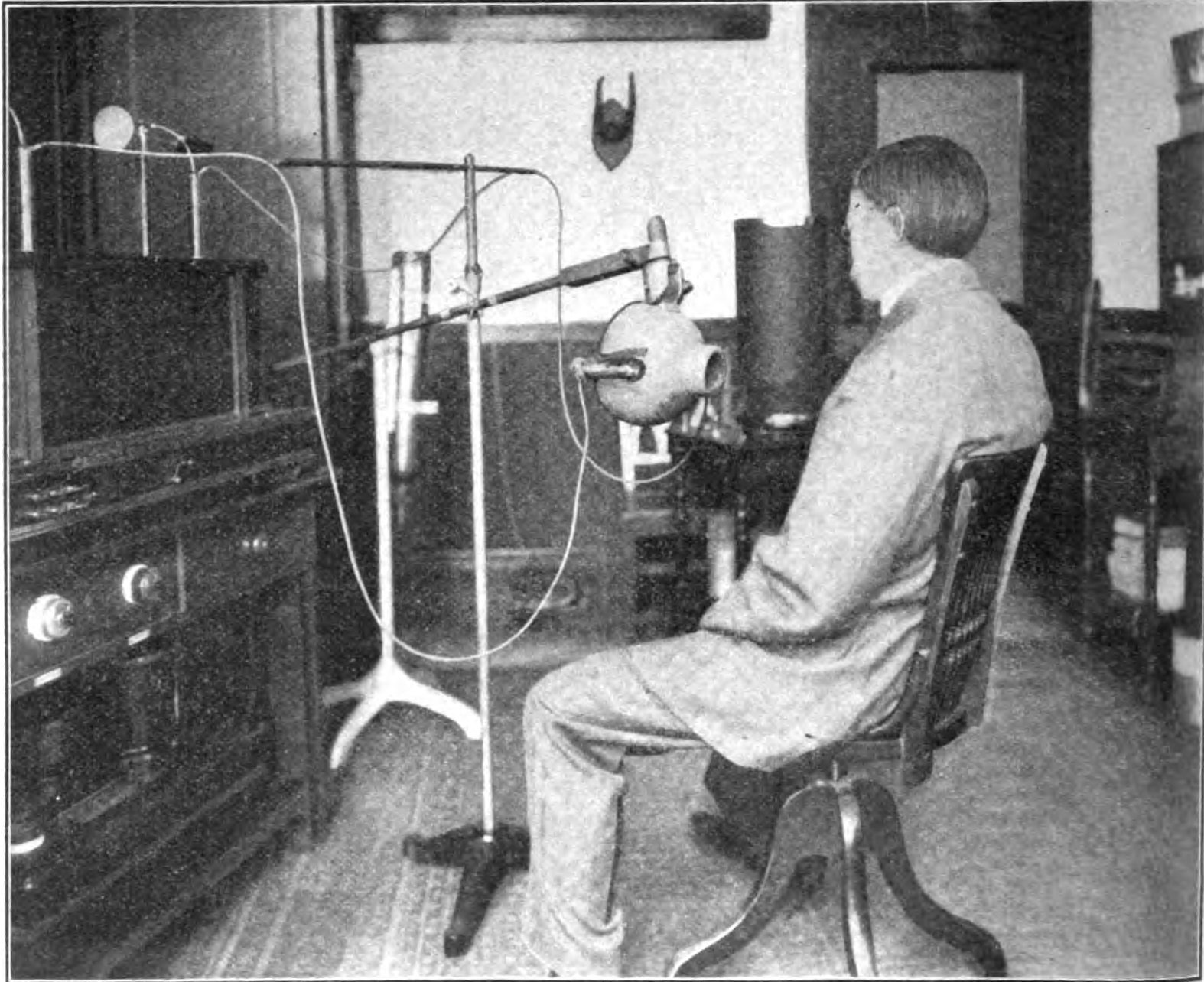
X-ray treatment of tuberculosis in 1910

X-rays and radium were noted by physicians to have different advantages in different cases. The most marked effects produced with radium therapy were with lupus, ulcerous growths, and keloid, particularly because they could be applied more specifically to tissues than with x-rays. Radium was generally to be preferred when a localized reaction was desired, while for x-rays when a large area needed to be treated. Radium was also believed to be bactericidal, while x-rays were not. Because they could not be applied locally, x-rays were also found to have worse cosmetic effects than radium when treating malignancies. In certain cases, a combination of x-ray and radium therapy was suggested. In many skin diseases, the ulcers would be treated with radium and the surrounding areas with x-rays so it would positively affect the lymphatic systems.

=== Tuberculosis and iodo-radium therapy ===
After using radium in the surgical treatment of tuberculosis, researchers including Béla Augustin and A. de Szendeffy soon developed a treatment using radioactive methyholated iodine, which was patented under the name dioradin (formed from "iodine and radium") in 1911. Application of this treatment was referred to as iodo-radium therapy, and involved injecting dioradin intramuscularly. It seemed promising to the developers, because in several cases, fever and hemoptysis had disappeared. Inhalation of iodine alone had been an experimental treatment for tuberculosis in France between 1830 and 1870.

== Commercialization, quackery, and the end of an era (1915–1935) ==
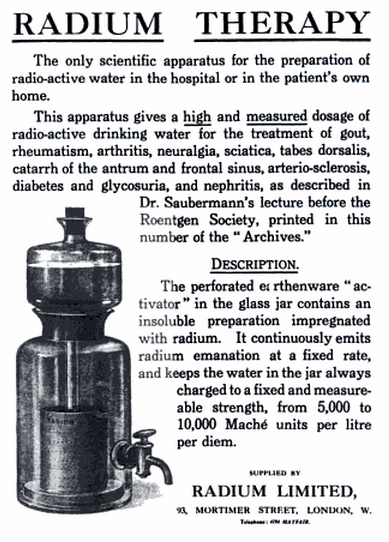
Advertisement for a scientifically developed radiation emanation activator. This particular device is suggested for use by Augustus Callé in a textbook on post-graduate medicine.

Widespread commercial exploitation of radium only began in 1913, by which time more efficient methods of extracting radium from pitchblende had been discovered and the mining of radium had taken off.

=== Commercial products ===
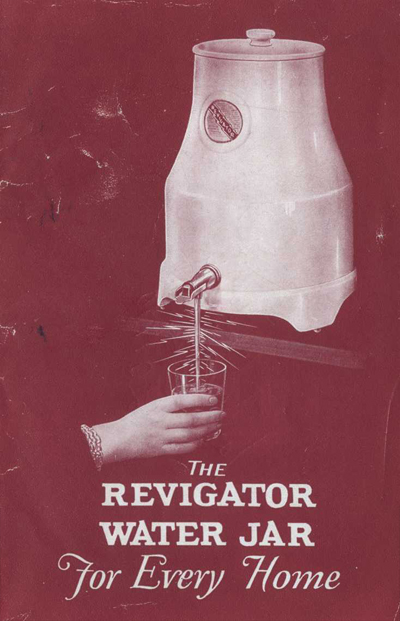
The Revigator "radioactive water crock" (1930s)

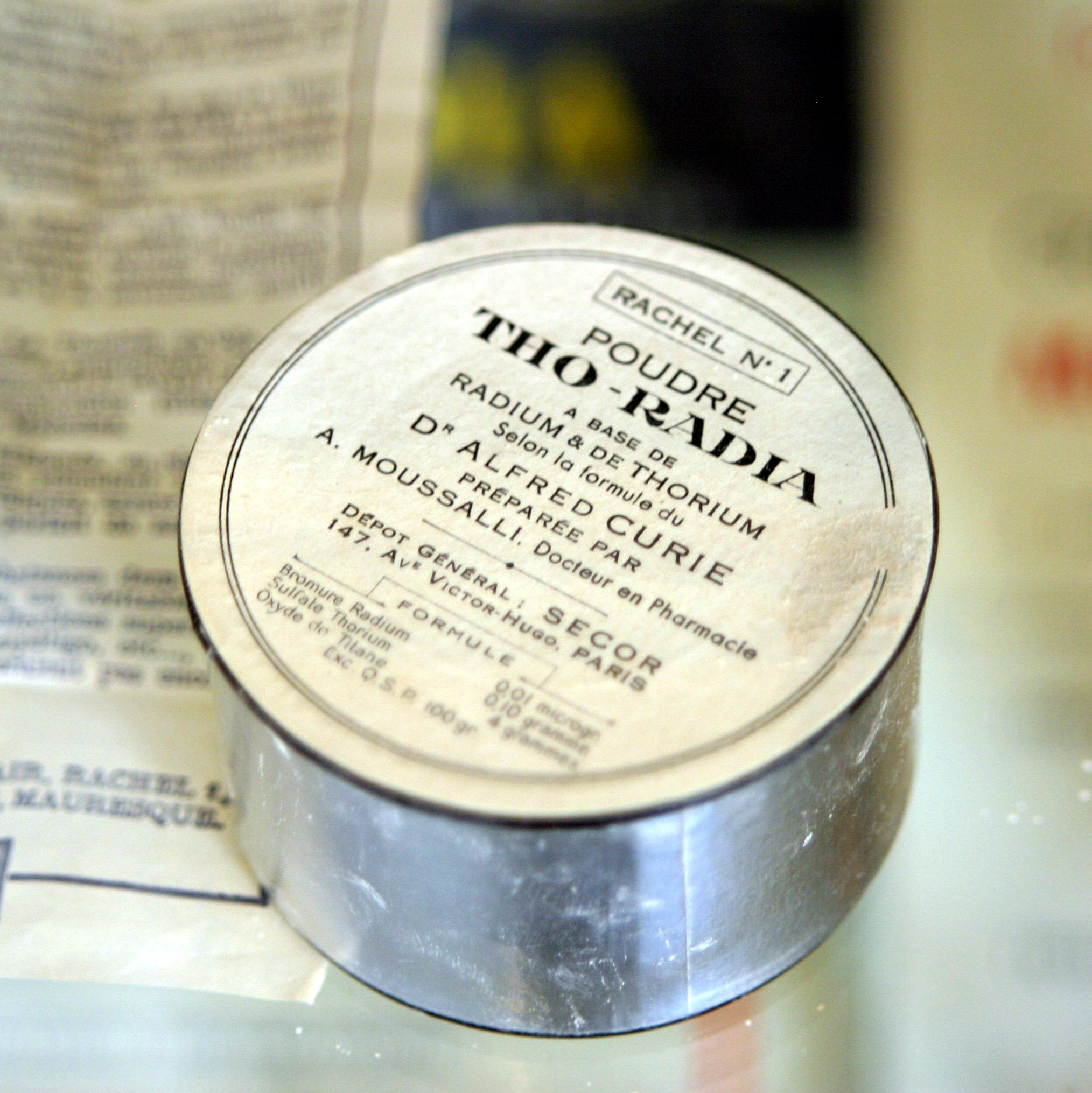
"Tho-radia" powder, based on radium and thorium, according to the formula of Dr Alfred Curie

The radium commonly used in bath salts, waters, and muds was in low-grade preparations, due to the expense, and their usefulness in curative solutions was questioned, since it had been agreed upon by physicians that radium could only be used successfully in high doses. It was believed that even radiation emanation at higher doses than were useful would cause no harm, because the radioactive deposits were found to have been absorbed and released in urine and waste within a period of three hours.

==== Radiation emanation activators ====
Radium emanation activators, apparatuses that would apply radium emanation to water, started being produced and marketed. Scientifically constructed emanators were sold to hospitals, universities, and independent researchers. Certain companies advertised that they would only give them out to others on a medical prescription and would guarantee the strength of radium in each dose.

Many products which imitated emanation activators were more broadly marketed to the public. One such product was the Revigator, a "radioactive water crock." A dispensing jar made of radium-containing ore, the idea was that radon produced by the ore would dissolve in the water overnight. It was advertised: "Fill jar every night. Drink freely ... when thirsty and upon arising and retiring, average six or more glasses daily." The American Medical Association (AMA) was concerned that the public was being fleeced by charlatans. In response, the AMA established guidelines (in effect from 1916 to 1929) that emanators seeking AMA approval had to generate more than 2 μCi (74 kBq) of radon per liter of water in a 24-hour period. Most devices on the market, including the Revigator, did not meet that standard.

==== Patent medicines ====
Many other quack cures and patent medicines were sold on the market. Radithor, a solution of radium salts, was claimed by its developer William J. A. Bailey to have curative properties. Many brands of toothpaste were laced with radium that was claimed to make teeth shine whiter, such as Doramad Radioactive Toothpaste. Ostensibly, this would be because the radium would kill the bacteria in a person's mouth. One item, called "Degnen's Radio-Active Eye Applicator" manufactured by the Radium Appliance Company of Los Angeles, California, was sold as a treatment for myopia, hypermetropia, and presbyopia. Face creams and powders were sold, with names like 'Revigorette' and 'Tho-radia'. It was also sold as a supplement to smoking cigarettes. Companies also marked radioactive pads and compresses for the treatment of illnesses.

=== Joachimsthal radium spa hotel ===
In light of the supposed curative properties of radioactivity, a spa was opened up in Joachimsthal, the place at which Madame Curie gathered some of her original samples of radium from spring waters. Radon inhalation rooms were set up, where air tubes carried the gas up from a processing tank in the basement; the visitor would then use it through an inhalation apparatus. Baths were set up which were also irradiated, and irradiated air was also filtered through a trumpet-like pipe for inhalation.

=== Public health concerns ===
Concerns about radium were brought up before the United States Senate by California Senator John D. Works as early as 1915. In a floor speech he quoted letters from doctors asking about the efficacy of the products that were marketed. He stressed that radiation had the effect of making many cancers worse, many doctors thought the belief that radium could be used to cure cancers at that stage of the development of therapy was a "delusion"—one doctor quoted cited a failure-to-success rate of 100 to 1—and the effects of radium water were undemonstrated.

Around the start of the 1920s, new public health concerns were sparked by the deaths of factory workers at a radioluminescent watch factory. In 1932, a well-known industrialist, Eben Byers died of radiation poisoning from the use of Radithor, a radium water guaranteed by the manufacturer to contain 2 μCi of radium. Cases sprung up of the development of carcinoma in patients who had used conventional radium therapy up to 40 years after the original treatments.

Robley D. Evans made the first measurements of exhaled radon and radium excretion from a former dial painter in 1933. At MIT he gathered dependable body content measurements from 27 dial painters. This information was used in 1941 by the National Bureau of Standards to establish the tolerance level for radium of 0.1 μCi (3.7 kBq).

=== Coutard method ===
At the International Congress of Oncology in Paris in 1922, Henri Coutard, a French radiologist working with the Institut Curie, presented evidence that laryngeal cancer could be treated without disastrous side-effects. Coutard was inspired by the observations of Claudius Regaud, who found that a single dose of x-rays enough to produce severe skin damage and tissue destruction in a rabbit, if administered in fractions, over a course of days, would sterilize the rabbit but have no effect on subcutaneous tissues.

By 1934, Coutard had developed a protracted, fractionated process that remains the basis for current radiation therapy. Coutard's dosage and fractionation were designed to create a severe but recoverable acute mucosal reaction. Unlike previous physicians, who believed that cancerous cells were more affected by radiation, he assumed that the population of cancerous cells had the same sensitivity for regeneration as normal cells. Coutard reported a 23% cure rate in the treatment of head and neck cancer. In 1935, hospitals everywhere began following his treatment plan.

== Radiation therapy today (1935–present) ==
"Radiation therapy" defined as the utilization of electromagnetic or particle radiation in medical therapy has 3 main branches, including external beam radiation therapy (teletherapy), locoregional ablative therapy (such as brachytherapy (sealed source radiation therapy), selective internal radiotherapy (SIRT), radiofrequency ablation, microwave ablation, and optical therapy), and systemic therapy (i.e. radiopharmaceutical therapy, such as radioligand therapy and unsealed source therapy)). There are three branches of radiology dealing with these three therapeutic domains: Radiation Oncology (teletherapy and brachytherapy), Interventional Radiology / Interventional Oncology (selective internal radiation therapy (SIRT), locoregional ablative therapy using RF ablation and microwave ablation), and Nuclear Radiology / Nuclear Medicine (using radiopharmaceutical therapy (RPT) and systemic unsealed sources).

Particle therapy is a special case of "radiation therapy" in which "emitted atomic particles" (such as electrons, protons, or neutrons) are used for energy delivery in therapy. Particle therapy is heavily used in Nuclear Radiology / Nuclear Medicine (radiopharmaceutical therapeutic agents are based on alpha particles, beta particles, or auger electrons), and to some extent in Radiation Oncology (external electron therapy and recent emerging modalities for external proton therapy). Nuclear Radiology / Nuclear Medicine specializes in the internal delivery of particle therapy whereas Radiation Oncology specializes in the external and locoregional delivery of particle therapy.

Intraoperative radiation therapy or IORT is a special type of radiation therapy that is delivered immediately after surgical removal of cancer. This method has been employed in breast cancer (TARGeted Intra-operative radiation Therapy or TARGIT), brain tumors, and rectal cancers.

Radioactive iodine, which has been used to treat thyroid diseases since 1941, survives today primarily in the treatment of thyrotoxicosis (hyperthyroidism) and some types of thyroid cancer that absorb iodine. Treatment involves the important iodine isotope iodine-131 (^{131}I), often simply called "radioiodine" (though technically all radioisotopes of iodine are radioiodines; see isotopes of iodine).
