= Radium fad =

Early 20th century radioactive quackery

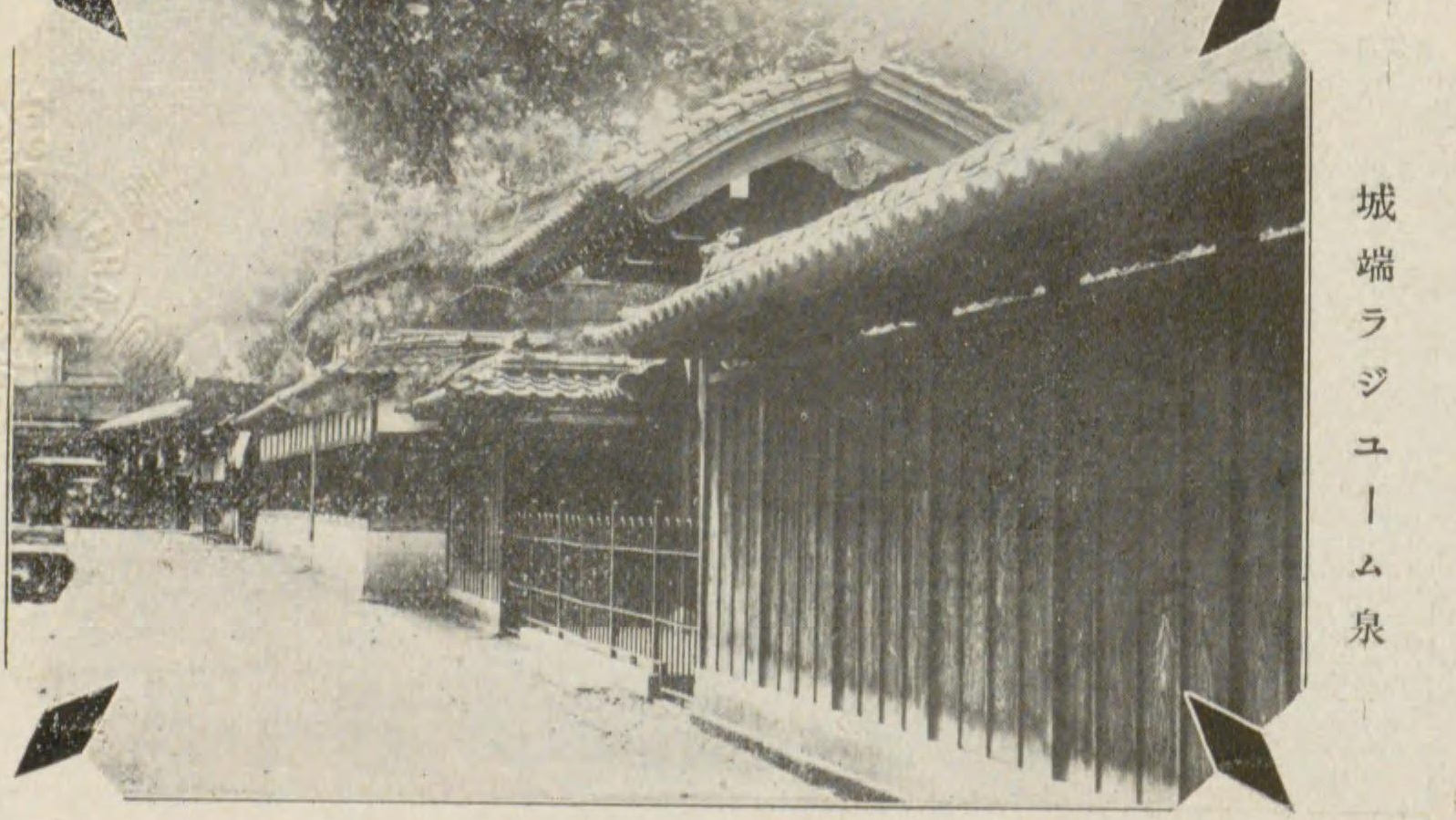
Photo card dated 1931 depicting Jōhana Radium Spring, in what is now Nanto, Toyama Prefecture, Japan

The radium fad or radium craze of the early 20th century was an early form of radioactive quackery that resulted in widespread marketing of radium-infused products as being beneficial to health. Many "radium products" contained no actual radium, in part because it was prohibitively expensive, which turned out to be a grace, as high levels of radium exposure can result in radiation-induced cancer.

The fad began to fizzle out following the emergence of research that radium could be hazardous to health, and high-profile cases such as the Radium Girls and the death of Eben Byers, which proved this fact.

In the United States, the 1938 Federal Food, Drug and Cosmetic Act outlawed deceptive packaging, further preventing companies being able to use radium as a marketing tool.

== Radium-infused products ==
Radium was added to, or used to market, a number of consumer goods. These included cosmetics, such as the brand Tho-Radia, toothpaste, hair cream, and hemorrhoid cream.

Radium was also used to market foods and drinks, although products such as Radium Brand Creamery Butter did not actually contain any radium. Radithor, an "energy drink" of distilled water with traces of radium, was marketed as a panacea. One of its most famous advocates, golfer Eben Byers, died in 1932 of radium poisoning through his consumption of the product. A number of water sources (such as bottlers or artesian hot-spring spa hotels) rebranded themselves as "radium water" or radium springs to capitalize on the craze. The California Waters of Life, promoted in 1906 as a miracle cure for cancer was tested by United States government officials and found that it contained "no ingredients beyond those present in ordinary spring water", and subsequently the company was condemned for misbranding; similarly, the Claremore Radium Wells Company from Fort Smith, Arkansas bottled water also did not contain actual radium or subproducts.

Radium was also used to give products a glowing appearance, as in the case of watches painted with radium-containing paint.

Radium was also used in some ceramics, including in the production of radium water crocks, whose purpose was to irradiate drinking water.

== Gallery ==
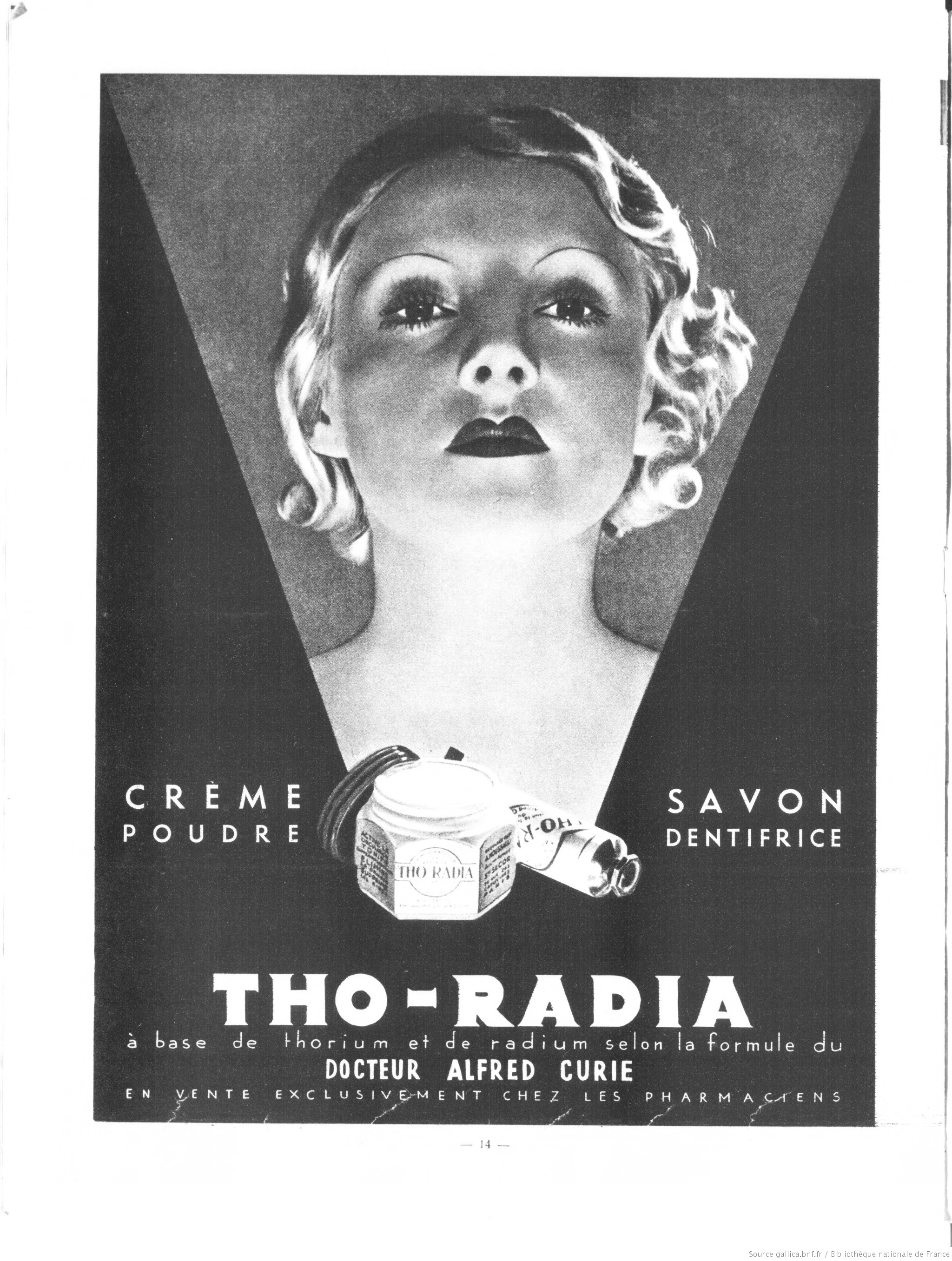
Tho-Radia advertising poster

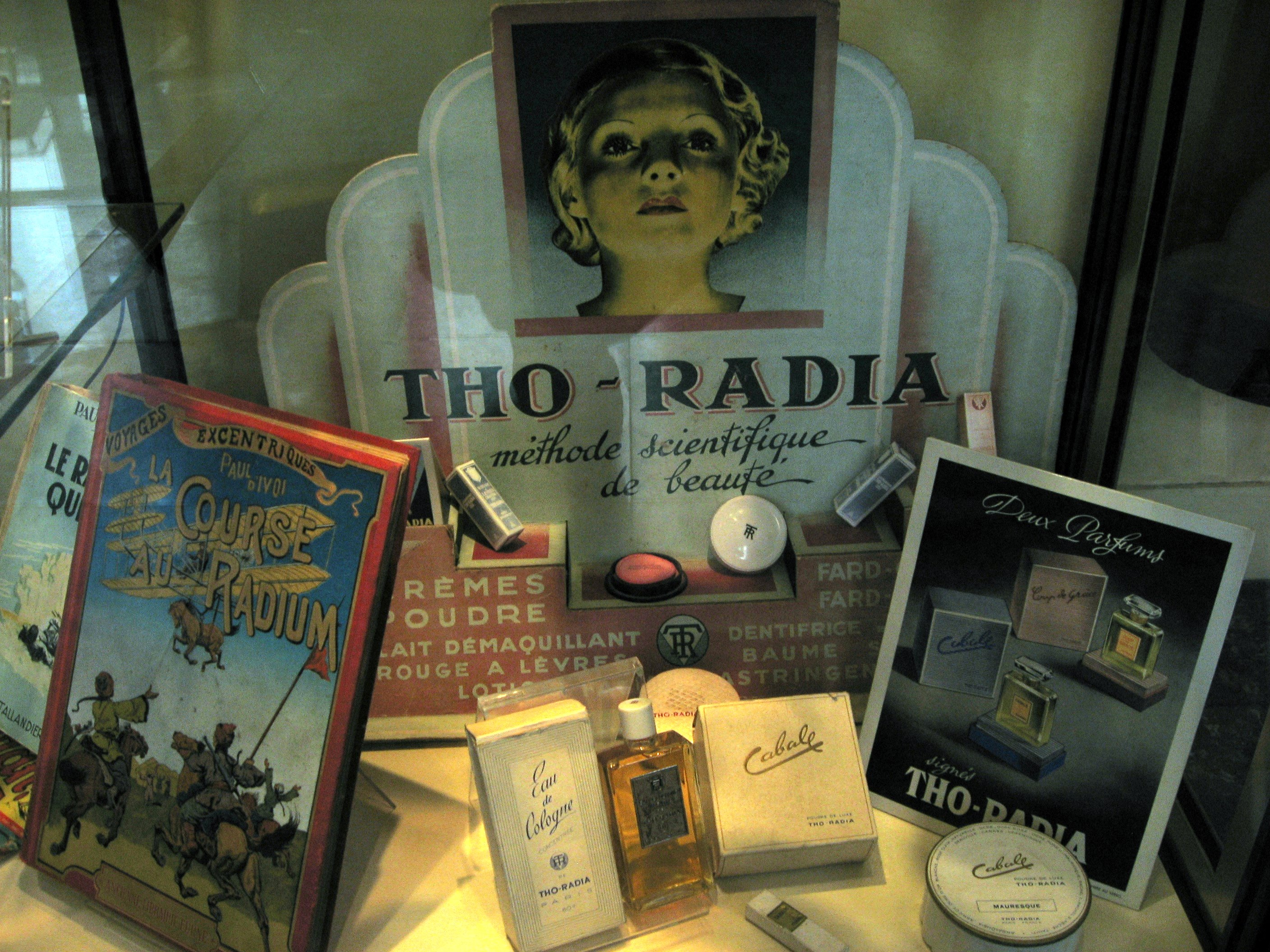
Tho-radia products

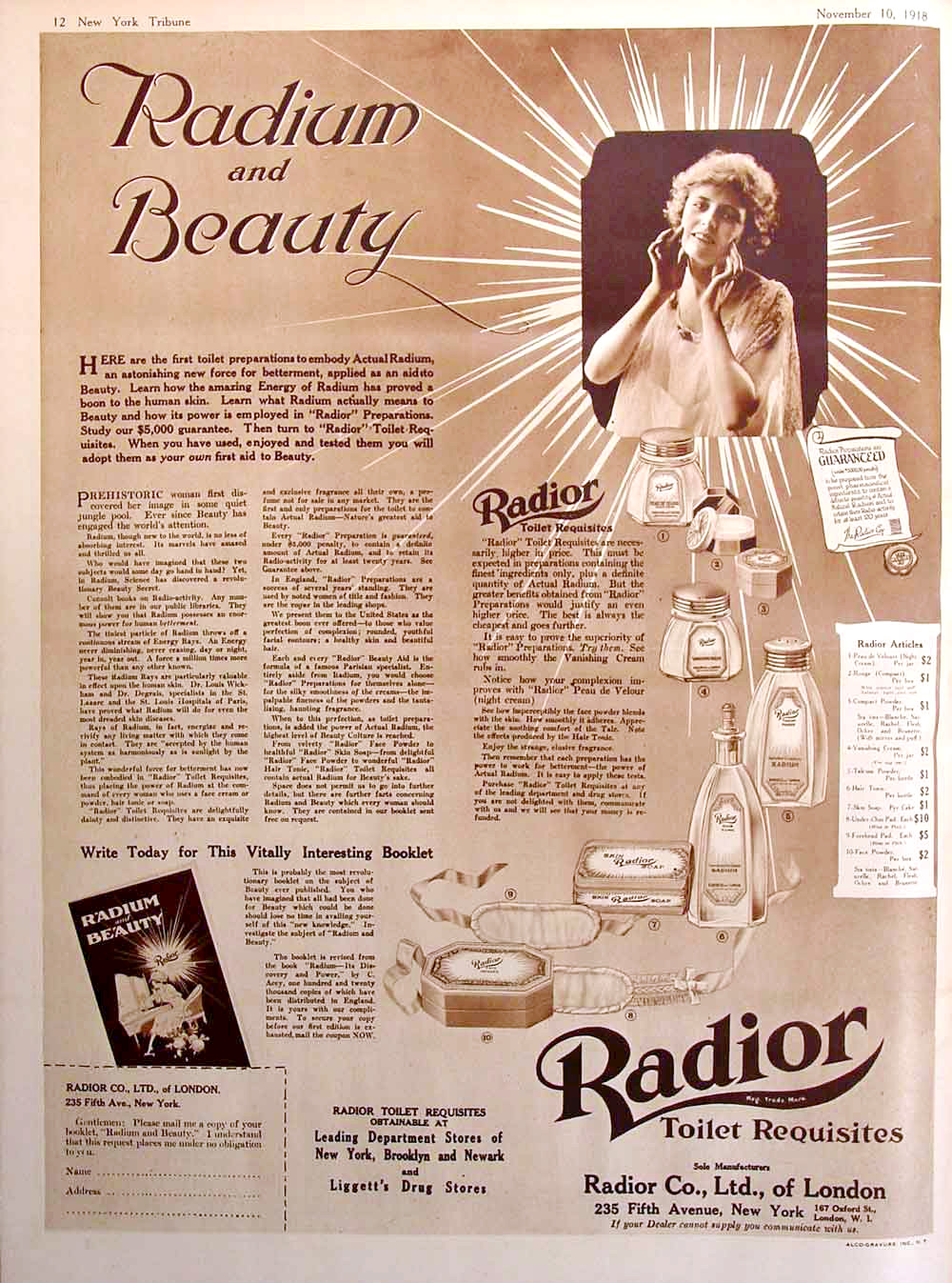
Radior cosmetics containing radium, 1918

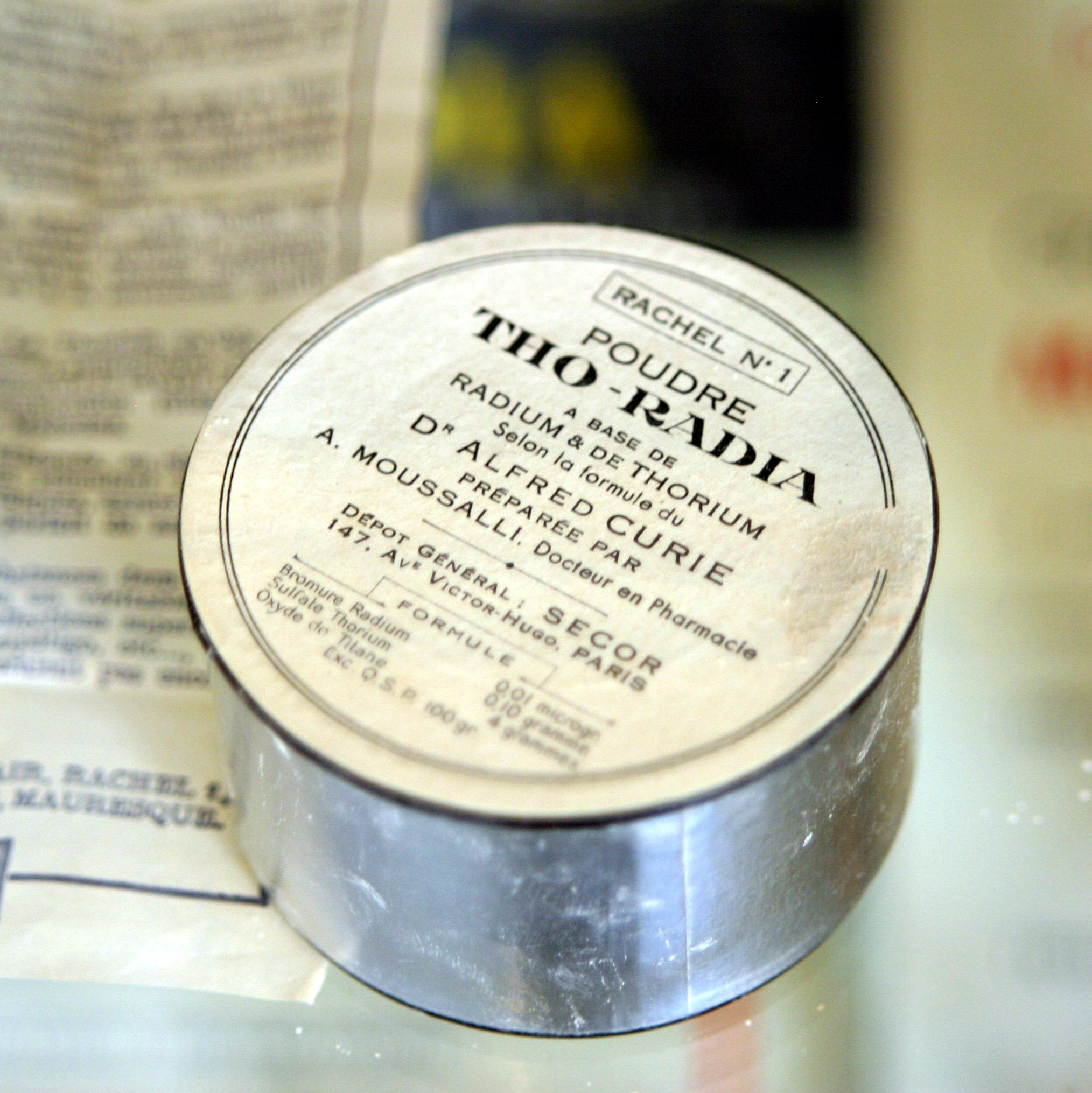
Tho-Radia face powder containing radium and thorium

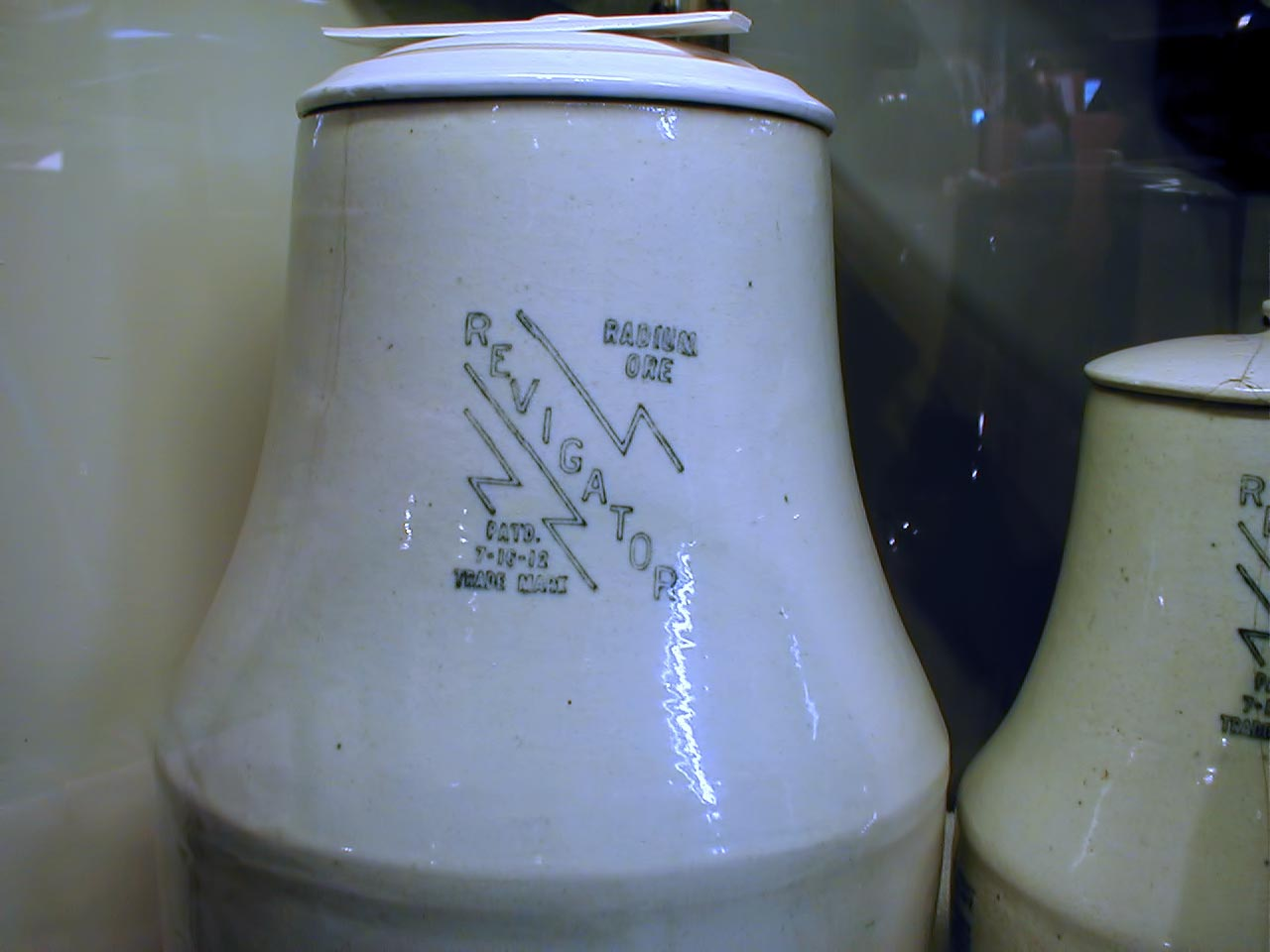
Revigorator, 1929, pottery crock lined with radioactive ore that emitted radon; drinking water in such a crock was considered curative.

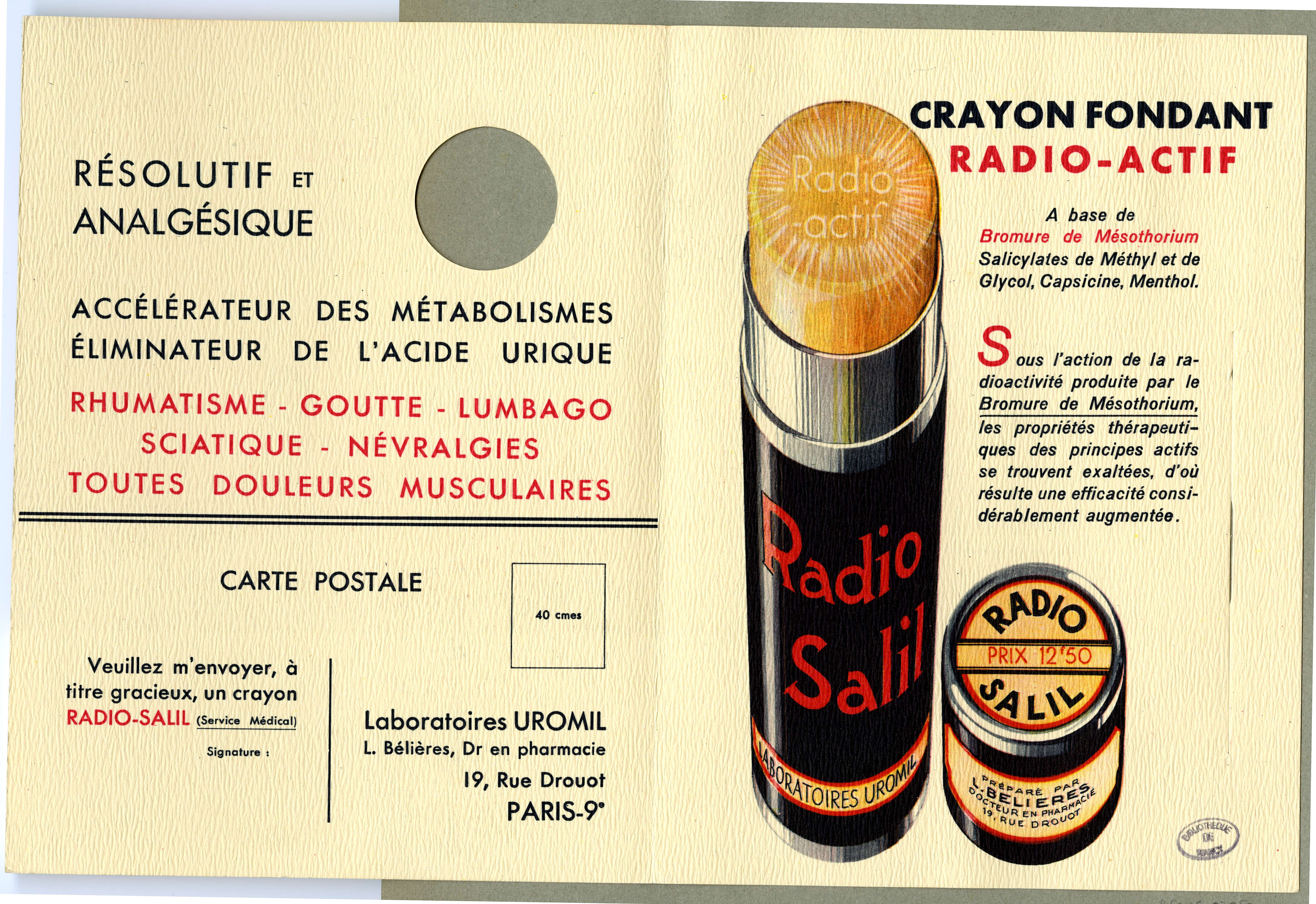
Crayon Fondant Radio-actif salve for muscular pain

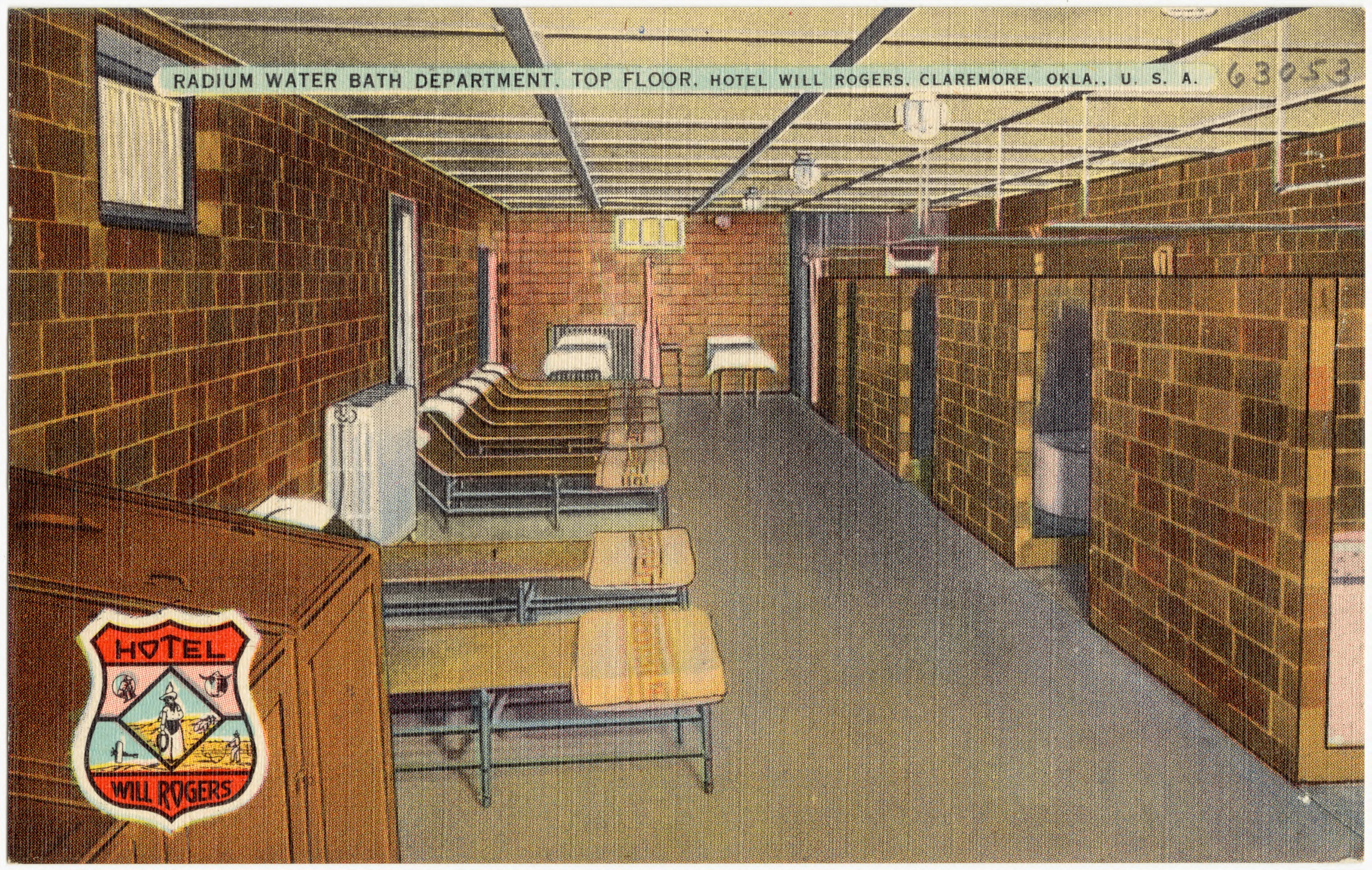
Radium Water Bath Department, top floor, Hotel Will Rogers, Claremore, Okla., U.S.A

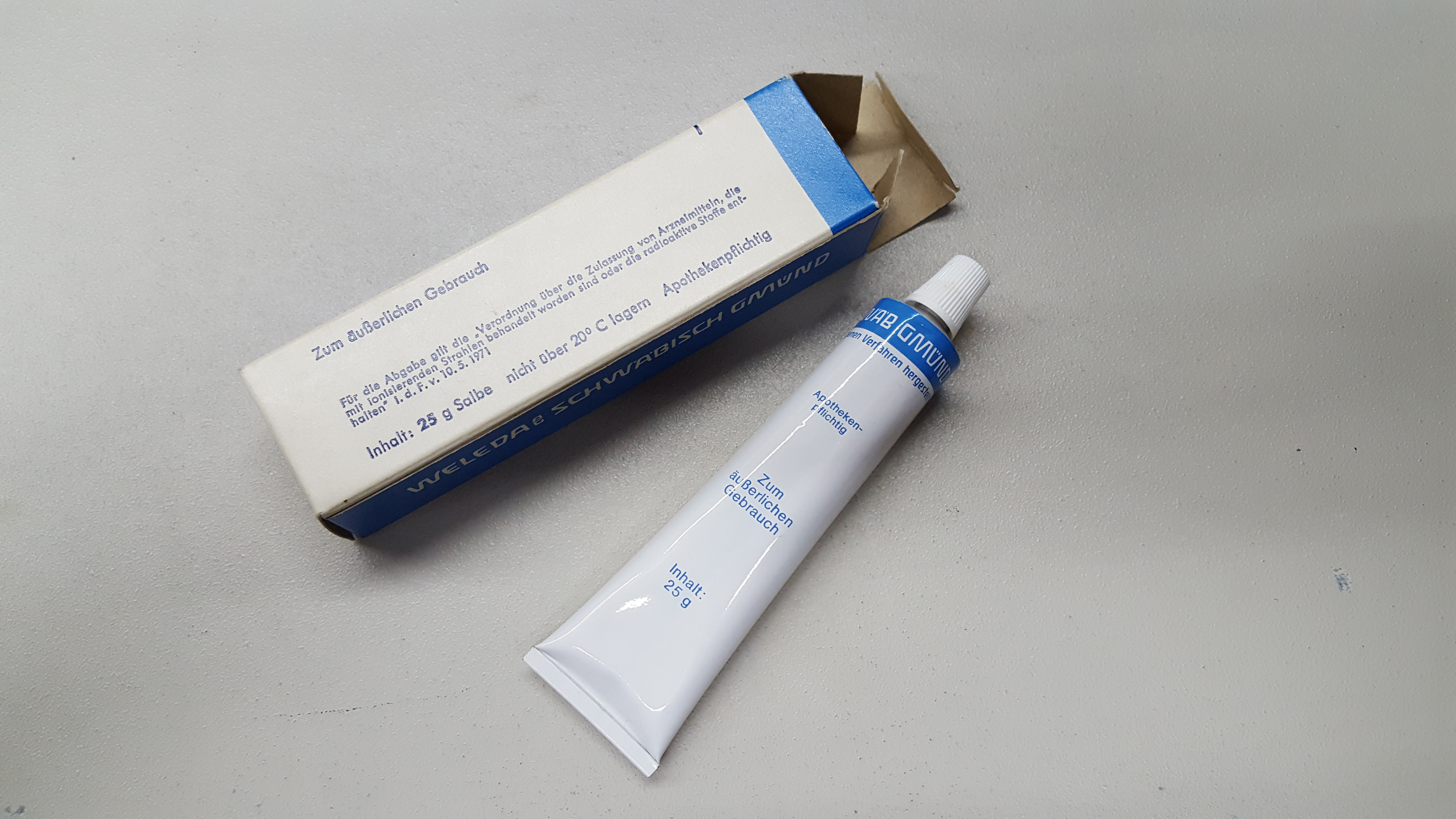
Weleda Uraninit-Salbe, radioactive salve for back pain containing radioactive uraninite ore containing radium, 1970s

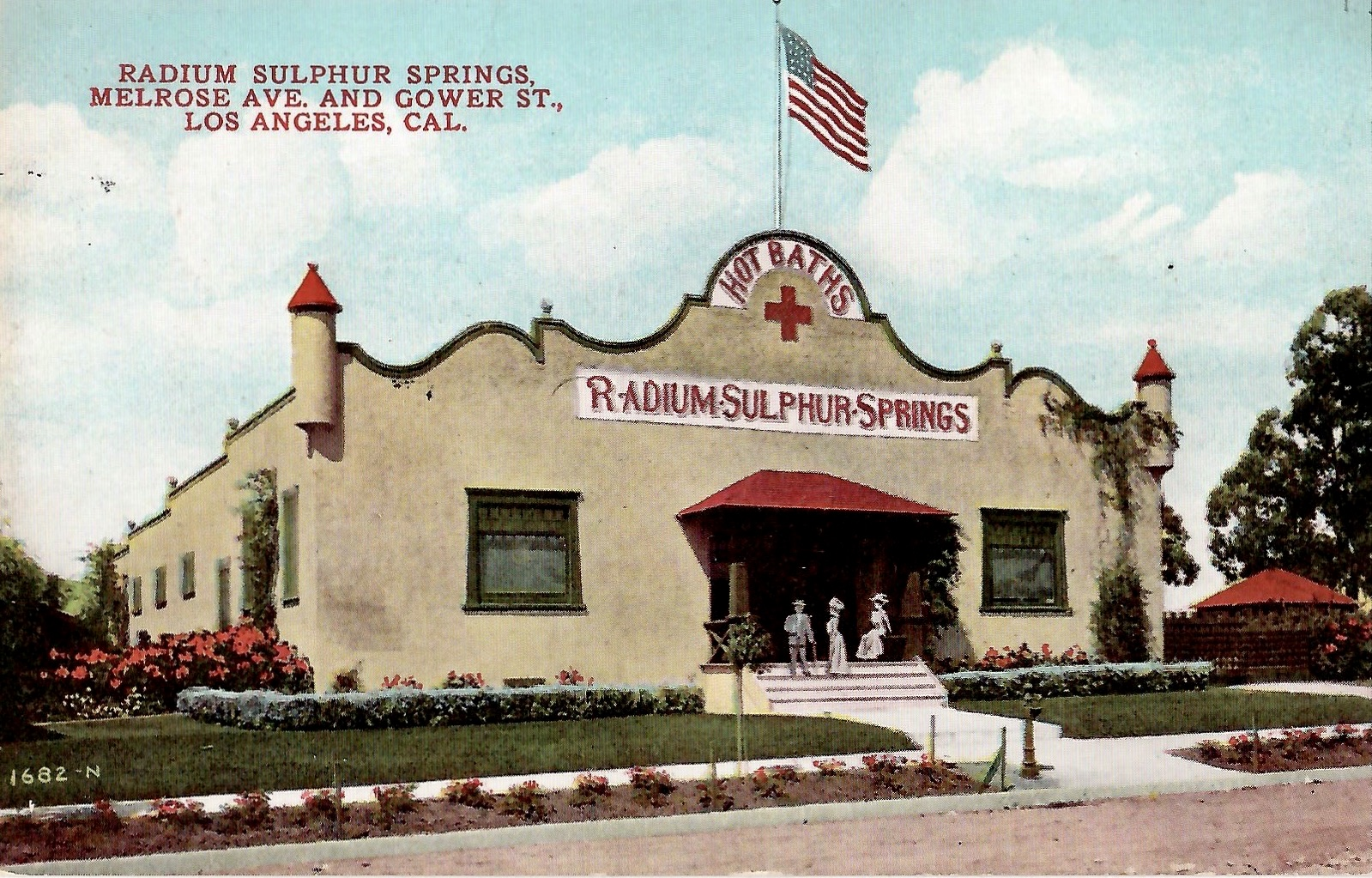
Radium Sulphur Springs bathhouse in Los Angeles, 1910s

== See also ==
- Uranium glass
- Lead pipes
- Arsenic green (disambiguation)
- Asbestos
- Electrical quackery
- History of radiation protection
