= Radithor =

Withdrawn radioactive patent medicine

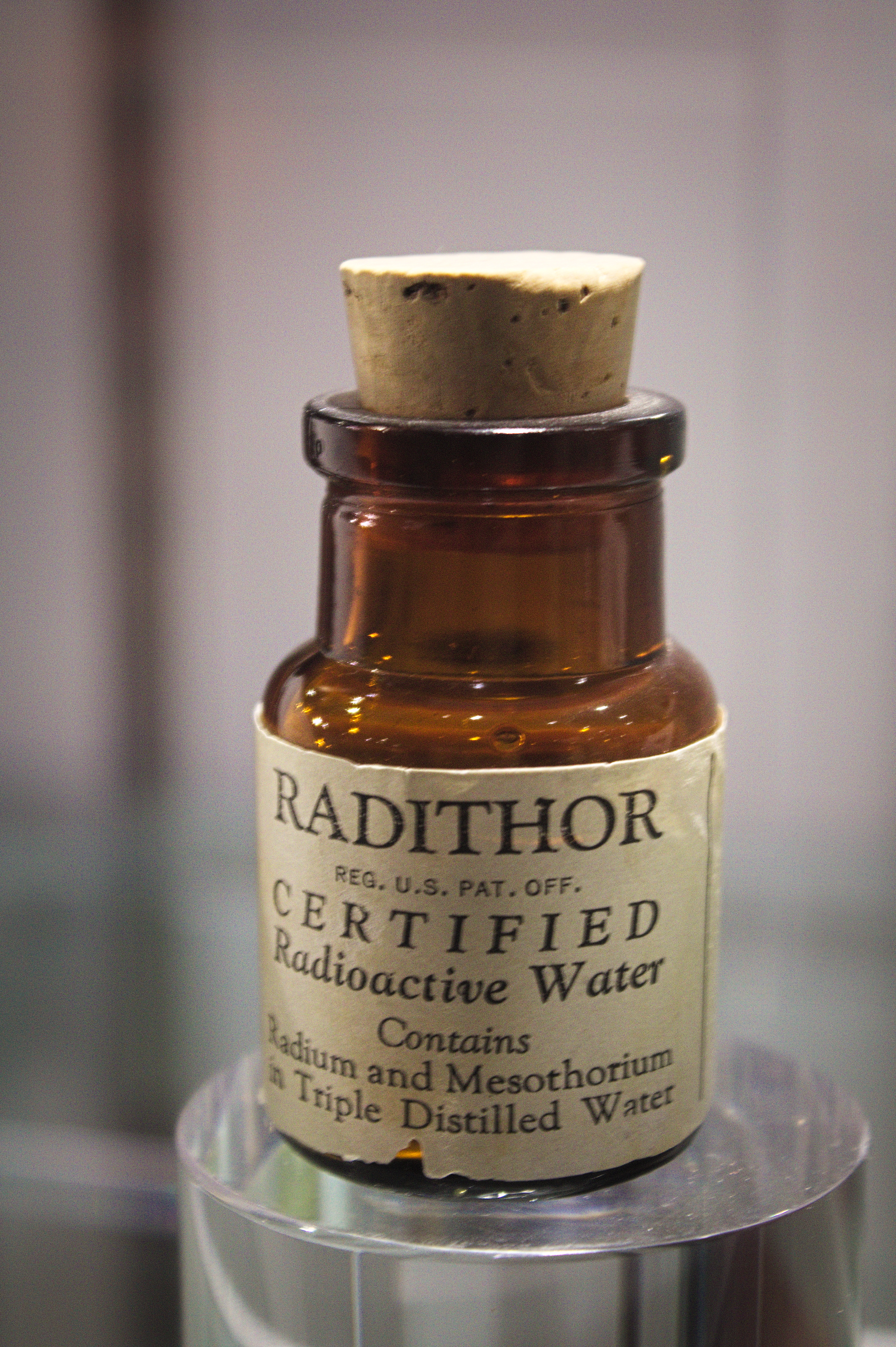
A bottle of Radithor at the National Museum of Nuclear Science & History in New Mexico, United States

Radithor was a radioactive patent medicine brand of distilled water containing at least 1 microcurie (37 kBq) each of the radium-226 and 228 isotopes, sold in 1/2 US fl oz (15 mL) bottles. In 1932, the illness and death of business magnate Eben Byers was unambiguously linked to his fervent use of Radithor, leading to the collapse of the radium fad and the strengthening of regulatory control of pharmaceutical and radioactive products in the United States.

Introduced in 1918, Radithor was William J. A. Bailey's biggest commercial success, selling 400,000 bottles between 1925 and 1930. The Food and Drug Administration (FDA) issued warnings against the use of Radithor but did not have the authority to ban it during this period.

== History ==
Radithor was manufactured from 1918 to 1928 by the Bailey Radium Laboratories of East Orange, New Jersey. The owner of the company and head of the laboratories was listed as William J. A. Bailey, a dropout from Harvard College, who was not a medical doctor. It was advertised as "A Cure for the Living Dead" as well as "Perpetual Sunshine". The expensive product was claimed to cure impotence among other ills.

Eben Byers, a wealthy American socialite, athlete, industrialist, and Yale College graduate, who drank 1,400 bottles of Radithor beginning in 1927, died in 1932 of various cancers as a result; before he died his jaw had to be removed. Byers was buried in a lead-lined coffin; when exhumed in 1965 for study, his remains were still radioactive and measured at 225,000 becquerels. As a comparison, the roughly 0.0169 g of potassium-40 present in a typical human body produces approximately 4,400 becquerels.

His death led to the strengthening of the Food and Drug Administration's powers and the demise of most radiation-based patent medicines. A Wall Street Journal article describing the Byers incident (published in August 1990) was titled "The Radium Water Worked Fine Until His Jaw Came Off".

== See also ==
- Doramad Radioactive Toothpaste
- Radium ore Revigator
- Radium Girls
- Radium jaw
- Tho-Radia
