= History of the Food and Drug Administration =

The Food and Drug Administration is a federal agency of the United States, formed in 1906.

== FDA history ==
=== Origins of federal food and drug regulation ===
Up until the 20th century, there were few federal laws regulating the contents and sale of domestically produced food and pharmaceuticals, with one exception being the short-lived Vaccine Act of 1813. A patchwork of state laws provided varying degrees of protection against unethical sales practices, such as misrepresenting the ingredients of food products or therapeutic substances. The history of the FDA can be traced to the latter part of the 19th century and the U.S. Department of Agriculture's. In 1848 Congress had passed one of the first drug importation laws. The goal of this measure was to keep non safe, or medically inaccurate drugs and substances from reaching or being sold to the American people. Under Harvey Washington Wiley, appointed chief chemist in 1883, the Division began conducting research into the adulteration and misbranding of food and drugs on the American market. All of these occurred prior to the formation of the Food and Drug Administration in 1906 that we know today. These precursors were used to safeguard drugs for the time being.

Although they had no regulatory powers, the Division published its findings from 1887 to 1902 in a ten-part series entitled Foods and Food Adulterants. Wiley used these findings, and alliances with diverse organizations such as state regulators, the General Federation of Women's Clubs, and national associations of physicians and pharmacists, to lobby for a new federal law to set uniform standards for food and drugs to enter into interstate commerce. Wiley's advocacy came at a time when the public had become aroused to hazards in the marketplace by muckraking journalists like Upton Sinclair, and became part of a general trend for increased federal regulations in matters pertinent to public safety during the Progressive Era.

The 1902 Biologics Control Act was put in place after diphtheria antitoxin was collected from a horse named Jim who contracted tetanus, resulting in several deaths. Much credit is given to the deaths of many people in the 1930s, including Eben Byers in 1932 from the ingestion of radithor and many women, some known as The Radium Girls, to making the FDA into the much more powerful organization we know today.

=== The 1906 Pure Food and Drug Act and creation of the FDA ===
In June 1906, President Theodore Roosevelt signed into law the Pure Food and Drug Act, also known as the "Wiley Act" after its chief advocate. The Act prohibited, under penalty of seizure of goods, the interstate transport of food which had been "adulterated," with that term referring to the addition of fillers of reduced "quality or strength," coloring to conceal "damage or inferiority," formulation with additives "injurious to health," or the use of "filthy, decomposed, or putrid" substances.

The act applied similar penalties to the interstate marketing of "adulterated" drugs, in which the "standard of strength, quality, or purity" of the active ingredient was not either stated clearly on the label or listed in the United States Pharmacopeia or the National Formulary. The act also banned "misbranding" of food and drugs.

Wiley used these new regulatory powers to pursue an aggressive campaign against the manufacturers of foods with chemical additives, but the Chemistry Bureau's authority was soon checked by judicial decisions, as well as by the creation of the Board of Food and Drug Inspection and the Referee Board of Consulting Scientific Experts as separate organizations within the USDA in 1907 and 1908 respectively.

However, these powers continued to be narrowly defined by the courts, which set high standards for proof of fraudulent intent. In 1927, the Bureau of Chemistry's regulatory powers were reorganized under a new USDA body, the Food, Drug, and Insecticide organization. This name was shortened to the Food and Drug Administration (FDA) three years later.

The original intent of the Food and Drug Administration was much smaller and was not yet envisioned to include or support dietary or drink consumption advice for the American people. However some argue that there were several instances where it was already doing this. Regulating health and pioneering as the world's first government certified drug review came much later and was far from the original goals and mission of the FDA.

=== The 1938 Food, Drug, and Cosmetic Act ===
By the 1930s, muckraking journalists, consumer protection organizations, and federal regulators began mounting a campaign for stronger regulatory authority by publicizing a list of injurious products which had been ruled permissible under the 1906 law, including radioactive beverages, the mascara Lash lure, which caused blindness, and worthless "cures" for diabetes and tuberculosis. The resulting proposed law was unable to get through Congress for five years, but was rapidly enacted into law following the public outcry over the 1937 Elixir Sulfanilamide tragedy, in which over 100 people died after using a drug formulated with a toxic, untested solvent.

President Franklin Delano Roosevelt signed the new Food, Drug, and Cosmetic Act (FD&C Act) into law on June 24, 1938. The new law significantly increased federal regulatory authority over drugs by mandating a pre-market review of the safety of all new drugs, as well as banning false therapeutic claims in drug labeling without requiring that the FDA prove fraudulent intent. The law also authorized factory inspections and expanded enforcement powers, set new regulatory standards for foods, and brought cosmetics and therapeutic devices under federal regulatory authority. This law, though extensively amended in subsequent years, remains the central foundation of FDA regulatory authority to the present day.

== Regulation of human drugs and medical devices after 1938 ==
=== Early FD&C Act amendments: 1938–1958 ===
After passage of the 1938 Act, the FDA began to designate certain drugs as safe for use only under the supervision of a medical professional, and the category of "prescription-only" drugs was securely codified into law by the 1951 Durham-Humphrey Amendment. This had effectively created a divide in which drugs were classified as over the counter (OTC) or prescription only. The FDA began enforcing its new powers against drug manufacturers who could not substantiate the efficacy claims made for their drugs, and the United States Court of Appeals for the Ninth Circuit ruling in Alberty Food Products Co. v. United States (1950) found that drug manufacturers could not evade the "false therapeutic claims" provision of the 1938 act by simply omitting the intended use of a drug from the drug's label. The FDA was tasked with reviewing some 13,000 new drug applications between 1938 and 1962. While the science of toxicology was in its infancy at the start of this era, rapid advances in experimental assays for food additive and drug safety testing were made during this period by FDA regulators and others. This change was the first major step that the FDA took in becoming a major part of the daily lives of the American people. It also cemented its role as a government institution that was fully funded and supported by the Federal Government.

The FDA was moved from the Department of Agriculture into the Federal Security Agency in 1940, and remained part of its successor, the Department of Health, Education and Welfare, when it was formed in 1953.

=== Expansion of premarket approval process: 1959–1985 ===
In 1959, Senator Estes Kefauver began holding congressional hearings into concerns about pharmaceutical industry practices, such as the perceived high cost and uncertain efficacy of many drugs promoted by manufacturers. There was significant opposition, however, to calls for a new law expanding the FDA's authority. This climate was rapidly changed by the thalidomide tragedy, in which thousands of European babies were born deformed after their mothers took that drug - marketed for treatment of nausea - during their pregnancies. Thalidomide had not been approved for use in the U.S. due to the concerns of an FDA reviewer, Frances Oldham Kelsey, about thyroid toxicity. However, thousands of "trial samples" had been sent to American doctors during the "clinical investigation" phase of the drug's development, which at the time was entirely unregulated by the FDA. Individual members of Congress cited the thalidomide incident in lending their support to expansion of FDA authority.

It also raised concerns regarding the Drug costs rising, the generally lack of supporting evidence in some cases and how they would properly convey evidence to show a drugs effectiveness or lack thereof. Finally the failure for generic brands of certain medications or drugs to be able to compete with massive manufactures in the current market. The 1962 Kefauver-Harris Amendment to the FD&C act represented a "revolution" in FDA regulatory authority. The most important change was the requirement that all new drug applications demonstrate "substantial evidence" of the drug's efficacy for a marketed indication, in addition to the existing requirement for pre-marketing demonstration of safety. This marked the start of the FDA approval process in its modern form. Drugs approved between 1938 and 1962 were also subject to FDA review of their efficacy, and to potential withdrawal from the market.

These reforms had the effect of increasing the time required to bring a drug to market. In the mid-1970s, 13 of the 14 drugs the FDA saw as most important to approve were on the market in other countries before the United States.

As part of the U.S. Public Health Service reorganizations of 1966–1973, FDA became part of the Public Health Service (PHS) within the Department of Health, Education, and Welfare in 1968. It was briefly placed under the short-lived PHS Consumer Protection and Environmental Health Service (CPEHS), but reemerged as an operating agency within PHS in 1970.

One of the most important statutes in establishing the modern American pharmaceutical market was the 1984 Drug Price Competition and Patent Term Restoration Act, more commonly known as the "Hatch-Waxman Act" after its chief sponsors. This act was intended to correct two unfortunate interactions between the new regulations mandated by the 1962 amendments, and existing patent law (which is not regulated or enforced by the FDA, but rather by the United States Patent and Trademark Office). Because the additional clinical trials mandated by the 1962 amendments significantly delayed the marketing of new drugs, without extending the duration of the manufacturer's patent, "pioneer" drug manufacturers experienced a decreased period of lucrative market exclusivity. On the other hand, the new regulations could be interpreted to require complete safety and efficacy testing for generic copies of approved drugs, and "pioneer" manufacturers obtained court decisions which prevented generic manufacturers from even beginning the clinical trial process while a drug was still under patent. The Hatch-Waxman Act was intended as a compromise between the "pioneer" and generic drug manufacturers which would reduce the overall cost of bringing generics to market and thus, it was hoped, reduce the long-term price of the drug, while preserving the overall profitability of developing new drugs.

The act extended the patent exclusivity terms of new drugs, and importantly tied those extensions, in part, to the length of the FDA approval process for each individual drug. For generic manufacturers, the Act created a new approval mechanism, the Abbreviated New Drug Application (ANDA), in which the generic drug manufacturer need only demonstrate that their generic formulation has the same active ingredient, route of administration, dosage form, strength, and pharmacokinetic properties ("bioequivalence") as the corresponding brand-name drug. This act has been credited with essentially creating the modern generic drug industry.

=== FDA reforms in the AIDS era ===
Concerns about the length of the drug approval process were brought to the fore early in the AIDS epidemic. In the mid- and late 1980s, ACT-UP and other HIV activist organizations accused the FDA of unnecessarily delaying the approval of medications to fight HIV and opportunistic infections, and staged large protests, such as a confrontational October 11, 1988 action at the FDA campus which resulted in nearly 180 arrests. In August 1990, Dr. Louis Lasagna, then chairman of a presidential advisory panel on drug approval, estimated that thousands of lives were lost each year due to delays in approval and marketing of drugs for cancer and AIDS.

Partly in response to these criticisms, the FDA issued new rules to expedite approval of drugs for life-threatening diseases, and expanded pre-approval access to drugs for patients with limited treatment options. The first of these new rules was the "IND exemption" or "treatment IND" rule, which allowed expanded access to a drug undergoing phase II or III trials (or in extraordinary cases even earlier) if it potentially represented a safer or better alternative to treatments currently available for terminal or serious illness. A second new rule, the "parallel track policy", allowed a drug company to set up a mechanism for access to a new potentially lifesaving drug by patients who for various reasons would be unable to participate in ongoing clinical trials. The "parallel track" designation could be made at the time of IND submission. The accelerated approval rules were further expanded and codified in 1992.

All of the initial drugs approved for the treatment of HIV/AIDS were approved through accelerated approval mechanisms. For example, a "treatment IND" was issued for the first HIV drug, AZT, in 1985, and approval was granted just two years later in 1987. Three of the first five drugs targeting HIV were approved in the United States before they were approved in any other country.

=== Regulation of living organisms ===
With acceptance of premarket notification 510(k) k033391 in January 2004, the FDA granted Dr. Ronald Sherman permission to produce and market medical maggots for use in humans or other animals as a prescription medical device. Medical maggots represent the first living organism allowed by the Food and Drug Administration for production and marketing as a prescription medical device. it was revolutionary to use these "organisms" In a medical capacity. It ensured that there would be broader testing on animals and other living mammals that would be tested and possibly suitable for humans to use or consume. There is more legal tape regarding the matter, but for the time being it was the first instance that truly allowed for the FDA to have lighter restriction and laws surrounding testing.

In June 2004, the FDA cleared Hirudo medicinalis (medicinal leeches) as the second living organism to be used as a medical devices.

=== The FDA and the opioid epidemic ===
Faced with the opioid epidemic, which had become a public health crisis by 2017, the FDA requested Endo Pharmaceuticals to remove oxymorphone hydrochloride from the market. It marked the first time the FDA had "taken steps to remove a currently marketed opioid pain medication from sale due to the public health consequences of abuse".

== Timeline of food and drug legislation ==
Most federal laws concerning the FDA are part of the Food, Drug and Cosmetic Act, (first passed in 1938 and extensively amended since) and are codified in Title 21, Chapter 9 of the United States Code. Other significant laws enforced by the FDA include the Public Health Service Act, parts of the Controlled Substances Act, the Federal Anti-Tampering Act, as well as many others. In many cases these responsibilities are shared with other federal agencies.

Important enabling legislation for the FDA includes:

- 1902 – Biologics Control Act
- 1906 – Pure Food and Drug Act
- 1938 – Federal Food, Drug, and Cosmetic Act
- 1944 – Public Health Service Act
- 1951 – 1951 Food, Drug, and Cosmetics Act Amendments PL 82–215
- 1962 – 1962 Food, Drug, and Cosmetics Act Amendments PL 87–781
- 1966 – Fair Packaging and Labeling Act PL 89–755
- 1976 – Medical Device Regulation Act PL 94–295
- 1987 – Prescription Drug Marketing Act
- 1988 – Anti-Drug Abuse Act of 1988 PL 100–690
- 1990 – Nutrition Labeling and Education Act PL 101–535
- 1992 – Prescription Drug User Fee Act PL 102–571
- 1994 – Dietary Supplement Health and Education Act
- 1997 – Food and Drug Administration Modernization Act 105-115
- 2002 – Bioterrorism Act 107-188
- 2002 – Medical Device User Fee and Modernization Act (MDUFMA) PL 107-250
- 2007 – Food and Drug Administration Amendments Act of 2007
- 2009 – Family Smoking Prevention and Tobacco Control Act
- 2011 – FDA Food Safety Modernization Act
- 2012 – Food and Drug Administration Safety and Innovation Act

== See also ==
- * Federal Tea Tasters Repeal Act of 1996
