= Negative ion products =

Negative ion products are products which claim to release negative ions and create positive health effects, although these claims are unsupported. Many also claim to protect users from 5G radiation. These claims are likewise unsubstantiated. A market has developed for these products due to conspiracy theories about 5G. Many of these contain radioactive substances. In a test of these bracelets by the International Journal of Environmental Research and Public Health, samples were found to have a yearly dose of up to 1.22 millisieverts a year, well in excess of the 1 millisievert limit recommended by the International Commission on Radiological Protection. As a result, they were banned in the Netherlands.
