= William J. A. Bailey =

American inventor and salesman (1884–1949)

- Born: William Aloysius Bailey; May 25, 1884; Boston, Massachusetts, U.S.
- Died: May 17, 1949 (aged 64); Boston, Massachusetts, U.S.
- Education: Harvard University (dropped out)
- Occupations: Inventor, businessman

William John Aloysius Bailey (May 25, 1884 – May 17, 1949) was an American patent medicine inventor and salesman. A Harvard University dropout, Bailey falsely claimed to be a doctor of medicine and promoted the use of radioactive radium as a cure for coughs, flu, and other common ailments, leading to death amongst consumers. Although Bailey's Radium Laboratories in East Orange, New Jersey, was continually investigated by the Federal Trade Commission, he died wealthy from his many devices and products, including an aphrodisiac called Arium, marketed as a restorative that "renewed happiness and youthful thrill into the lives of married peoples whose attractions to each other had weakened."

== Early life ==
Bailey was born on May 25, 1884, in Boston, Massachusetts, and attended Boston Latin School. He was later accepted to Harvard University but did not graduate.

== Career ==
In 1918, Bailey claimed that radium added to drinking water could be used to treat dozens of conditions, from mental illness and headaches to diabetes, anemia, constipation, and asthma.

In 1922, he had had some success selling medicines like Arium radium tablets (‘Radium! Gives Super-Man Power’) through his other company, Associated Radium Chemists Inc. The company also sold Linarium (radium liniment for aches and pains), Dentarium (radium dentifrice for teeth and gums) and Kaparium (radium hair tonic).

Bailey became rich from the sale of Radithor, a well known patent medicine/snake oil that is possibly the best known example of radioactive quackery. Bailey created Radithor by dissolving radium salts in water to deliver 1 microcurie of radiation from each of ^{226}Ra and ^{228}Ra, claiming its curative properties were due to stimulation of the endocrine system. Radithor was advertised as "A Cure for the Living Dead" as well as "Perpetual Sunshine".

Radithor was a chronically lethal mixture, and was responsible for the death of Eben Byers in 1932, who died of radiation-induced cancer after having drunk about 1,400 bottles of Radithor.

Bailey also invented the Radiendocrinator around 1930. This was a cased source, intended to be worn against the skin.

During World War II, Bailey was the wartime manager of the electronic division of International Business Machines.

== Death ==
Bailey died of bladder cancer on May 17, 1949. When his body was exhumed nearly 20 years later, it was found to be "ravaged by radiation".

== See also ==
- Radioactive quackery
