= Arsenic green =

Arsenic green is a pigment or dye that gets its colour from the element arsenic and may refer to:

- Scheele's green
- Paris green
