= NICO Clean Tobacco Card =

Radioactive device for cigarettes

The NICO Clean Tobacco Card was a device exported from Japan to the United States in the 1960s, consisting of a small card impregnated with low grade uranium ore. The card was to be placed inside a pack of cigarettes. The producers claimed that the radiation emitted by the card would reduce tar and nicotine, and enhance the smoking experience. In practice, the quantity of uranium used was so small as to barely be detectable and the device had no effect.

A similar product, the Nicotine Alkaloid Control Plate, was produced in the 1990s but not exported.
