= Otto Walkhoff =

German dentist and pioneer of dental radiography (1860-1934)

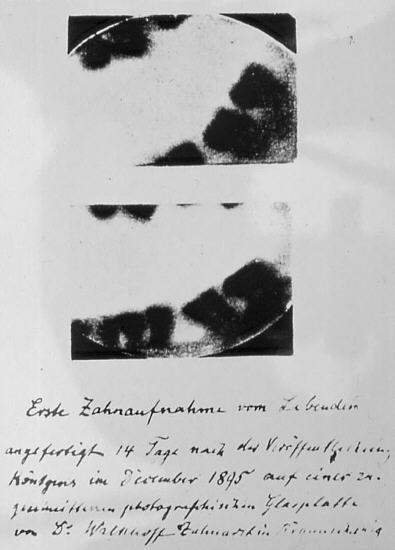
- First dental radiograph on a living person, January 1896
- Born: Friedrich Otto Walkhoff; April 23, 1860; Brunswick (Braunschweig), Duchy of Brunswick, German Confederation
- Died: June 8, 1934 (aged 74); Lichterfelde (Berlin), Germany
- Occupations: Dentist, professor
- Known for: First dental X-ray; advocacy for the academic degree Dr. med. dent.

Friedrich Otto Walkhoff (23 April 1860 – 8 June 1934) was a German dentist, academic, and an early pioneer of dental radiography. In January 1896, within weeks of Wilhelm Conrad Röntgen's discovery, he produced one of the first intra-oral dental radiographs using an improvised setup in Braunschweig. He later became a leading organizer of the profession and advocated successfully for conferring the degree Doctor medicinae dentariae (Dr. med. dent.) in Germany. Research in 2020 highlighted his early membership in the National Socialist German Workers' Party (NSDAP), prompting the renaming of a scientific prize that had borne his name.

== Life and education ==
Walkhoff was born in Braunschweig and qualified as a dentist in Berlin at age 21. After early practice and research in Braunschweig, he developed interests in dental histology and pathology and maintained a private laboratory alongside his practice. In 1901, he accepted a position at the dental institute of the Ludwig-Maximilians-Universität München and later directed the university dental clinic at the University of Würzburg.

== Radiography pioneer ==
In January 1896, Walkhoff produced an intraoral radiograph in Braunschweig using glass photographic plates held in his own mouth; exposure reportedly lasted about 25 minutes. The setup and early doses reflected the rudimentary state of X-ray safety at the time.

Walkhoff also took part in, and publicized, early experiments with radium that produced skin injuries, contributing to awareness of radiation hazards.

== Career, leadership and politics ==
Beyond laboratory and clinical work, Walkhoff became one of the most visible organizers of German dentistry in the early 20th century. He served as president of the Central Association of German Dentists (German: Centralverein deutscher Zahnärzte, CVdZ) from 1906 to 1926 and promoted full academic recognition of the discipline; the German doctorate Dr. med. dent. was introduced in 1918.

Studies published in 2020 documented Walkhoff's membership in the NSDAP (party number 172,024; joined 1929). In response, the German Society for Operative Dentistry (DGZ) renamed the Walkhoff-Preis to the DGZ-Publikationspreis.

== Selected publications ==
- With Walter Hess. Lehrbuch der konservierenden Zahnheilkunde [Textbook of Conservative Dentistry]. Berlin: H. Meusser, 1921.
- Gutachten über die Wirkung des Chlorphenol-Kampfer-Menthols [Expert Report on the Effects of Chlorophenol-Camphor-Menthol]. Berlin: Berlinische Verlagsanstalt, 1930.
- Das Problem der dentalen Fokalinfektion und ihrer Bekämpfung durch die konservierende Zahnheilkunde [The Problem of Dental Focal Infection and Its Treatment Through Conservative Dentistry]. Jena: Fischer, 1931.

== Legacy ==
Walkhoff's name is associated with the Walkhoff paste (iodoform-based) used historically as a temporary root canal dressing, and with the first intra-oral dental radiographs. Histories of radiology credit his and colleague Friedrich Giesel's early self-experiments with shaping awareness of radiation risks.

== Death ==
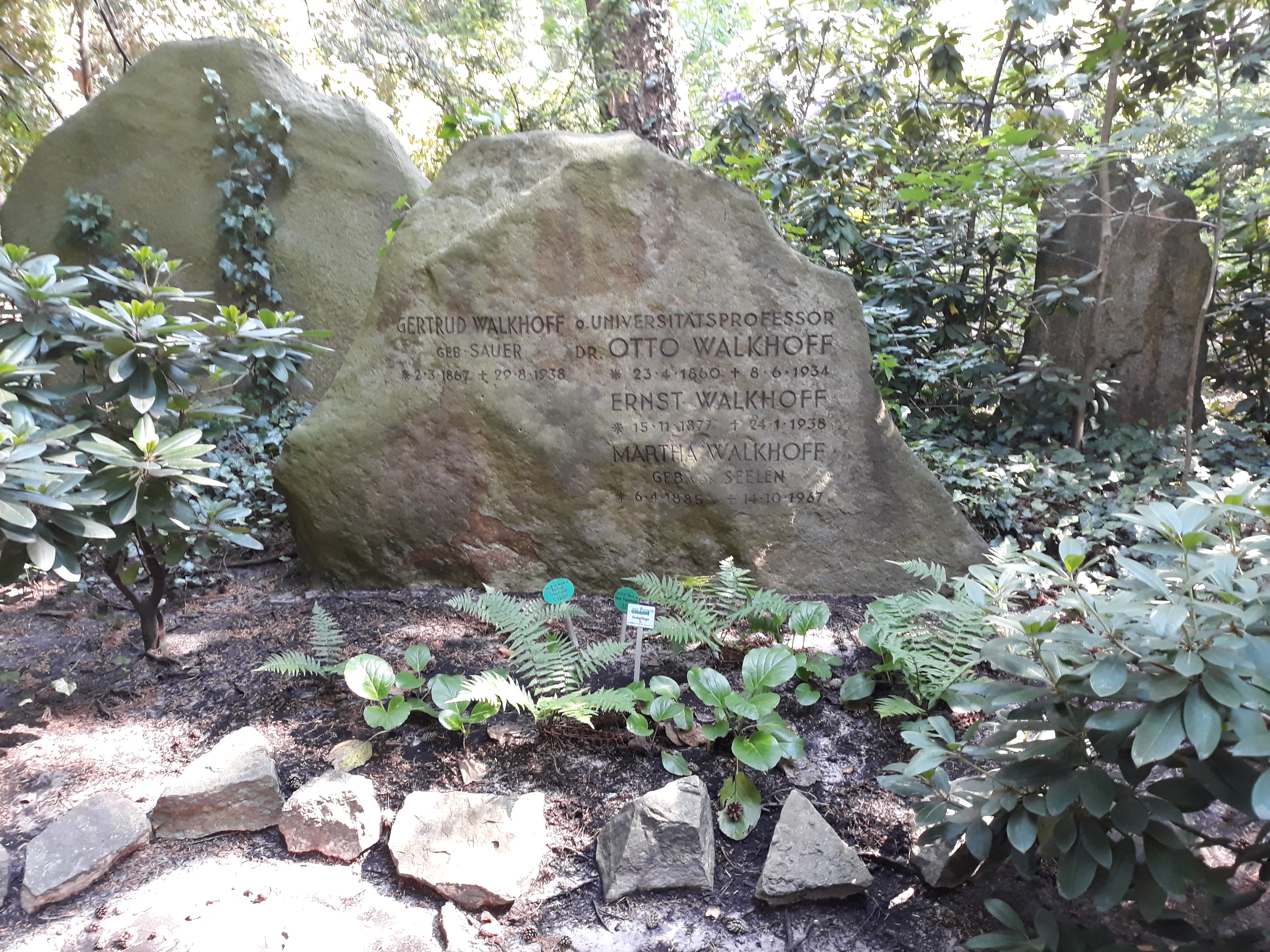
Grave of Otto Walkhoff at Parkfriedhof Lichterfelde

Walkhoff died on 8 June 1934 in Berlin-Lichterfelde and is buried at the Parkfriedhof Lichterfelde.
