= Radium ore Revigator =

Radioactive quack device

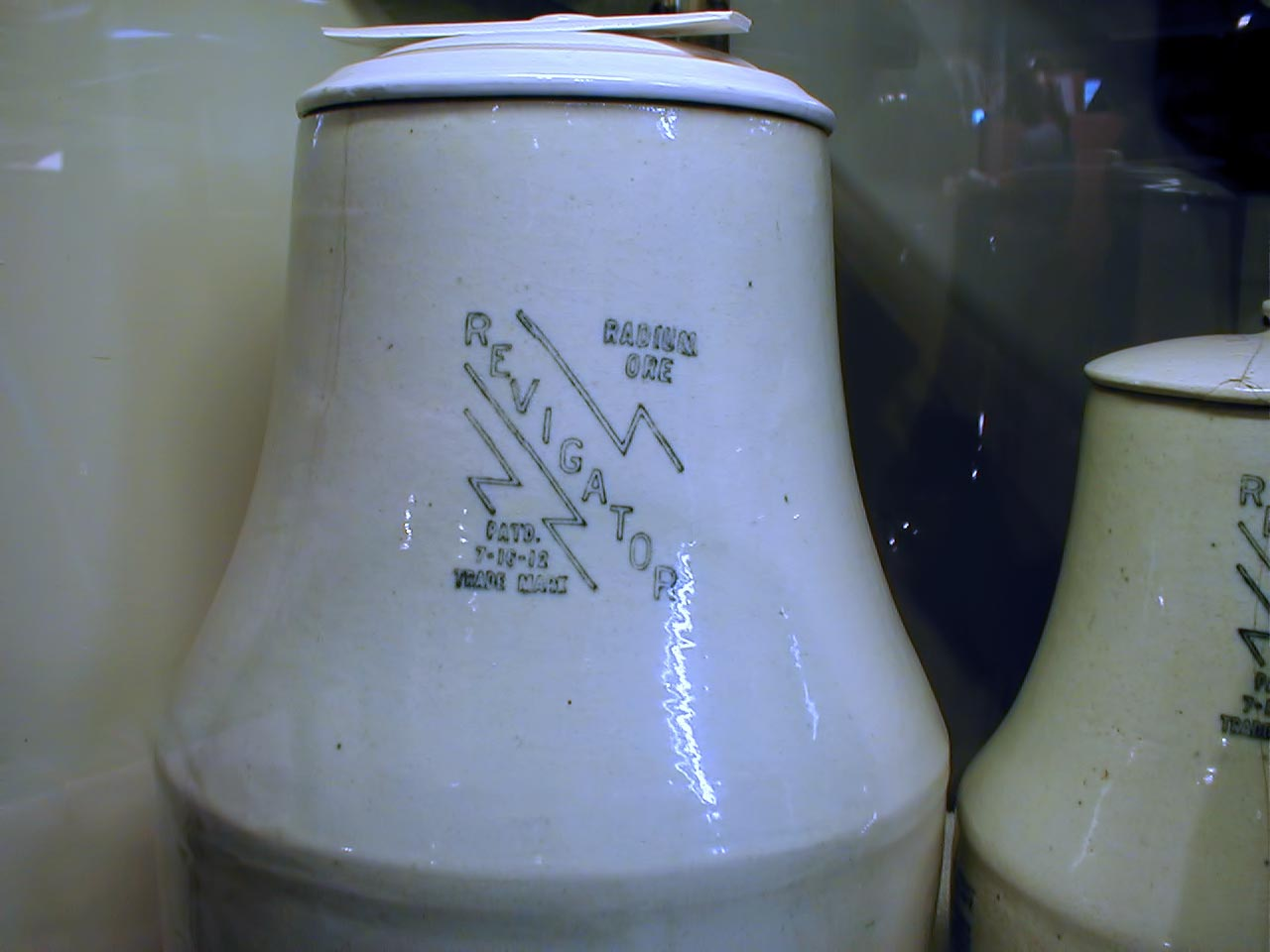
A Revigator crock

The radium ore Revigator was a pseudoscientific medical device consisting of a ceramic water crock lined with radioactive materials. It was patented in 1912 by R. W. Thomas. Thomas was working at the time as a stock salesman in Arizona but, by 1923, had moved to southern California to begin manufacture of his patent. In 1924, following several successful advertisement campaigns that left him unable to keep up with demand, he sold his operation to Dow-Herriman Pump & Machinery Company, selling thousands of the devices in the 1920s and 1930s.

The Revigator was intended to be filled with water overnight, which would be irradiated by the uranium and radium in the liner, and then consumed the next day.

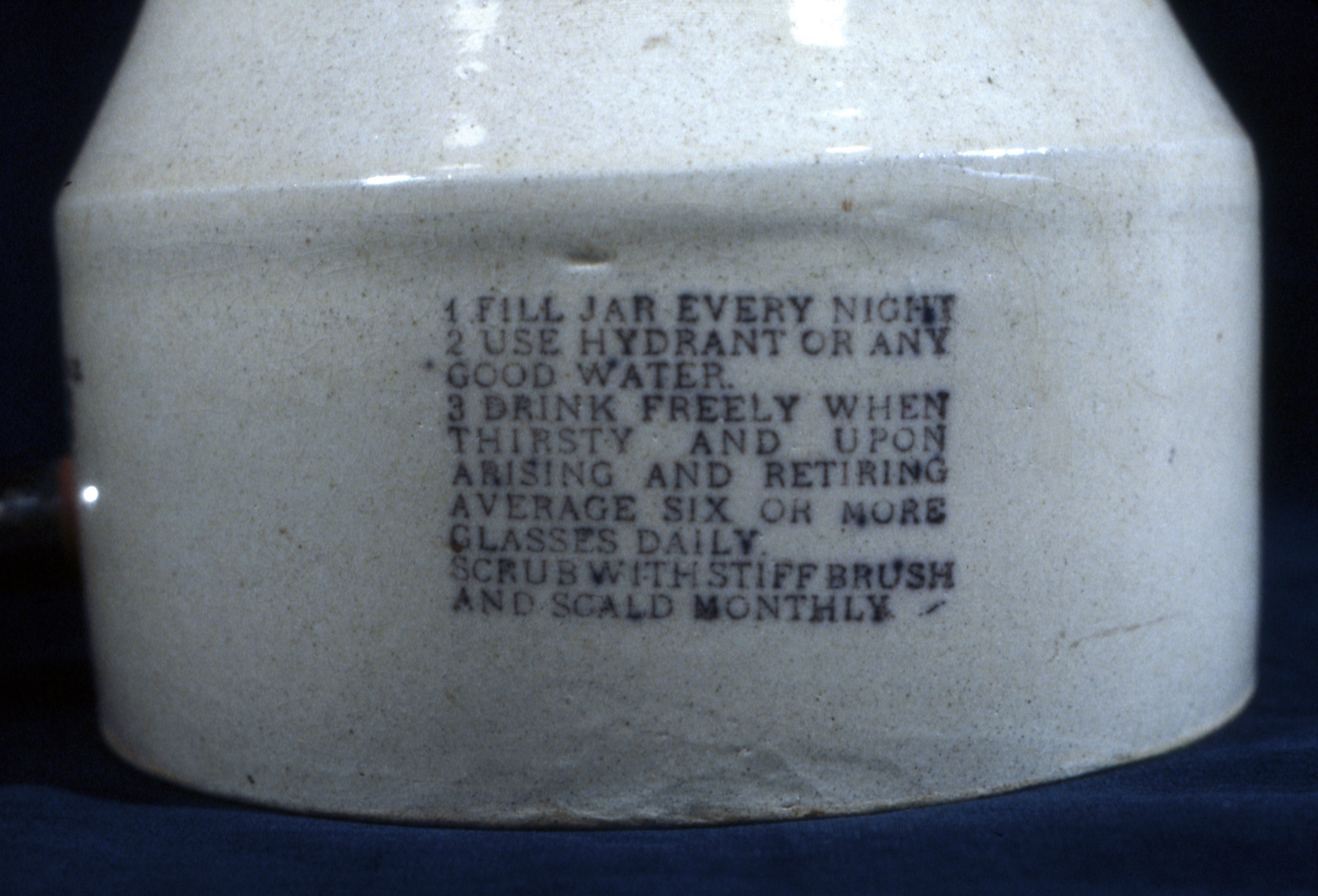
Instructions printed on crock

The manufacturer provided the following instructions: "Fill jar every night. Drink freely … when thirsty and upon arising and retiring, average six or more glasses daily."

This was marketed as a healthy practice which could prevent illnesses including arthritis, flatulence, and senility.

The Revigator contained carnotite K_{2}(UO_{2})_{2}(VO_{4})_{2}·3H_{2}O. Water stored overnight in a vintage Revigator was analyzed by ICP-MS and radiation detectors. Although the water contained high levels of radon, a Mount St. Mary's University study posited that the health risk from radiation was probably low relative to the other causes of mortality at the time. The water also contained levels of arsenic, lead (due to the fact that it had a lead spout), vanadium, and uranium that pose a health risk.

== See also ==
- Radithor
- Radioactive quackery
