= Tho-Radia =

French cosmetics brand (1932–1968)

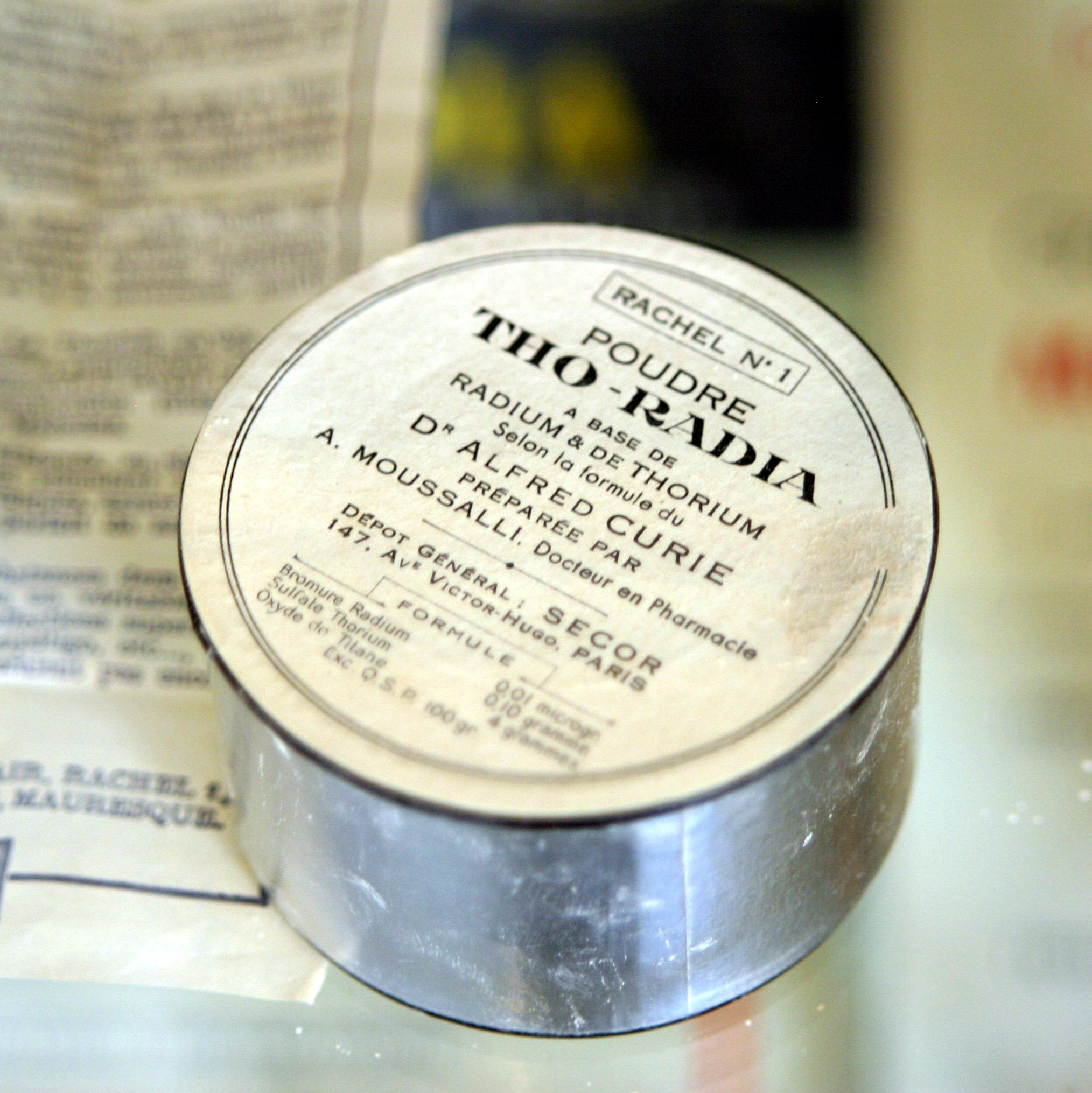
Tho-Radia powder box "made after Dr Alfred Curie's formula" at Musée Curie in Paris

Tho-Radia was a French pharmaceutical company making cosmetics between 1932 and 1968. Tho-Radia-branded creams, toothpastes and soaps were notable for containing radium and thorium until 1937, as a scheme to exploit popular interest for radium after it was discovered by Pierre and Marie Skłodowska-Curie, in a fad of radioactive quackery.

== Foundation ==
=== So-called "microcurietherapy" ===
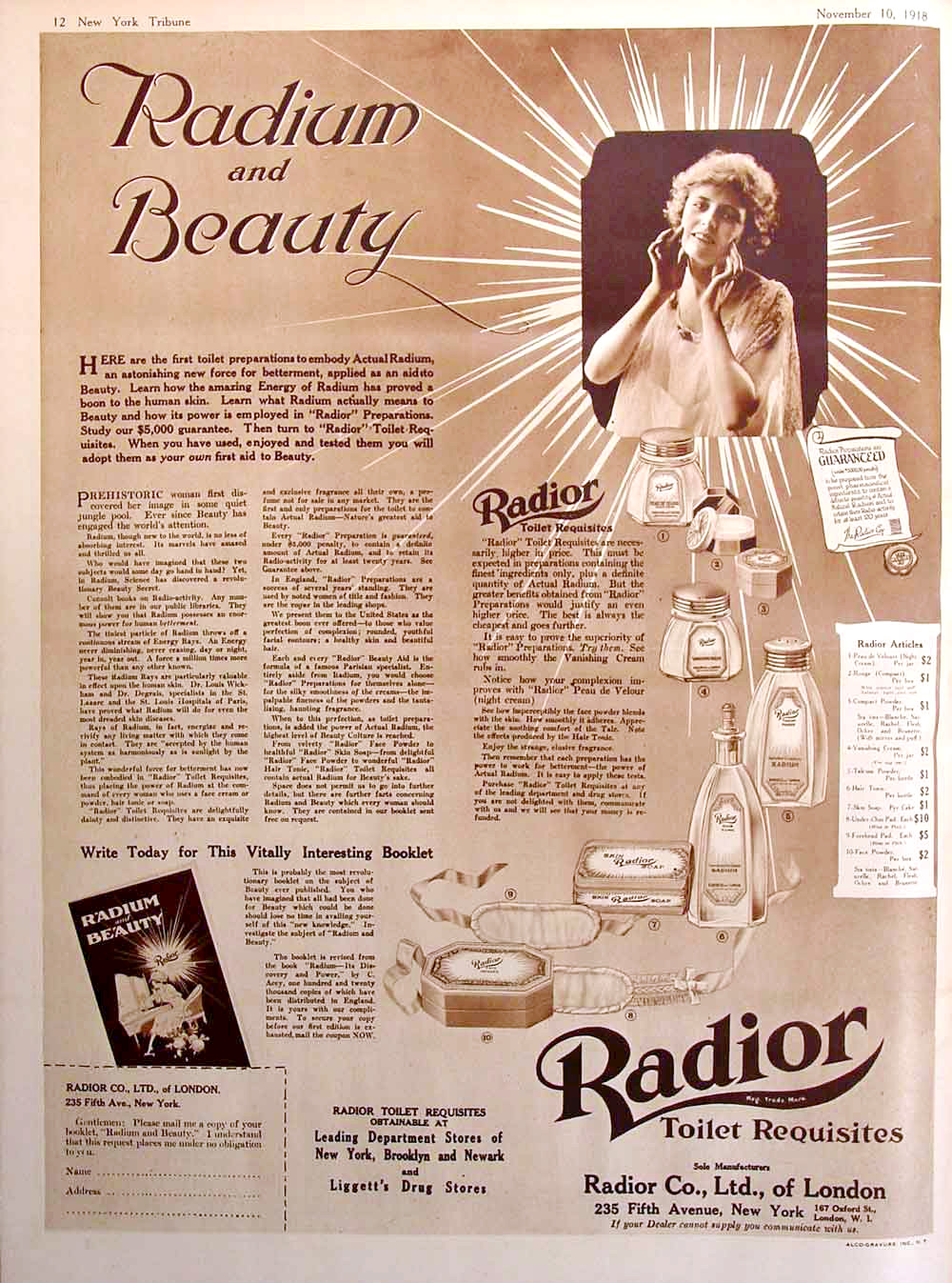
"Radium and Beauty": 1918 advert for Radior, another cosmetic brand whose products contained radium

In the early 1910s, French pharmacist Alexandre Jaboin postulated the principles of "microcurietherapy", inspired by the success of curietherapy in treating certain cancers: he assumed that very small doses of radium would stimulate living cells and increase their energy. These notions were not scientifically demonstrated, but they triggered a fad for radium-laden medicine and cosmetics. Several brands started exploiting the market in the course of the 1910s, notably Activa and Radior.

=== Dr Alfred Curie's formula ===
In the early 1920s, pharmacist Alexis Moussalli joined the Millot pharmaceutical laboratories in Paris. Using his expertise in rare-earth elements, he invented a beauty cream laden with thorium chloride and radium bromide. In order to start his own brand and as a marketing device, he associated with Alfred Curie, a medical doctor, homonymous to Pierre and Marie Curie but with no connection to them. Pierre and Marie Curie apparently considered legal action against the company. Alfred Curie was to register the Tho-Radia brand on 29 November 1932 and approved the mention "after Dr Alfred Curie's formula" on the packaging and publicities.

== The Tho-Radia company ==
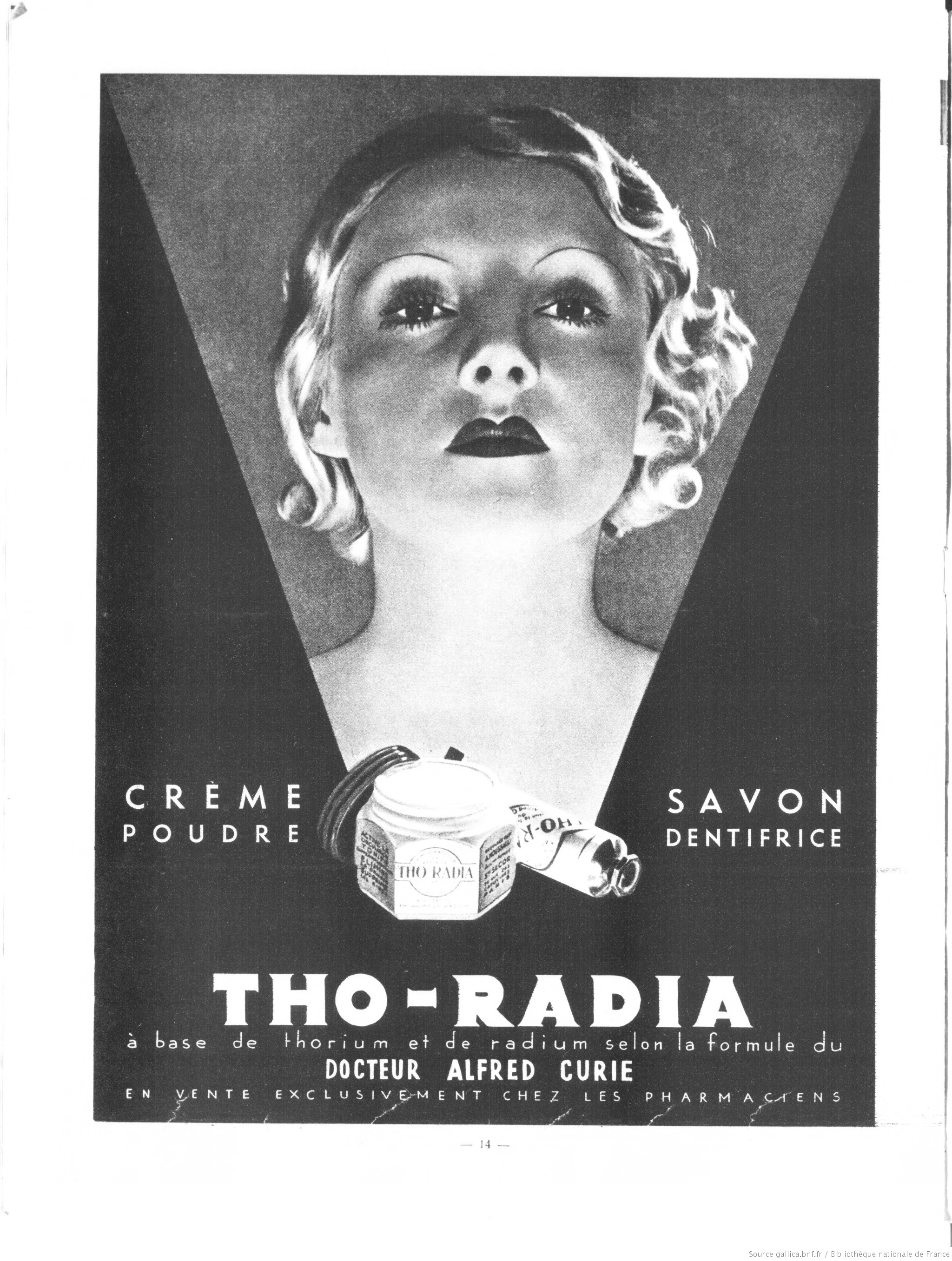
Publicity for Tho-Radia products, appearing in Cinémagazine on 14 February 1935

In order to launch his company, Alexis Moussalli also associated with Secor (Société d'exportation, commission, représentation), a French-American corporation, which was to field Tho-Radia products on the market. The brand was officially launched in 1932 for Paris and in 1933 for the rest of France. Tho-Radia creams got noticed through their recognisable advertising, designed by publicist Tony Burnand, depicting a young, blond woman lit from below by visible rays. This image, which became associated with the brand in the public consciousness, would serve into the 1950s. The success of Tho-Radia creams allowed Alexis Moussalli to start selling powder, toothpaste and soap, although the two later were sold as containing only thorium.

The first products by Tho-Radia did actually contain radium, as a July 1932 analysis by Colombes scientific research laboratory certified that 100 grams of cream contained "0,223 microgram of radium bromide".

From 1937, regulation on radioactive materials changed, limiting their usage to medical prescription and mandating a red label with the mentions "Poison", or "Toxic" for products with internal use. Tho-Radia then changed its marketing, and on 23 April 1937, SECOR registered the Tho-Radia brand again, but leaving out any mention of radium and of Alfred Curie, only to keep the name of the now successful line of products.

=== Relocation to Vichy ===
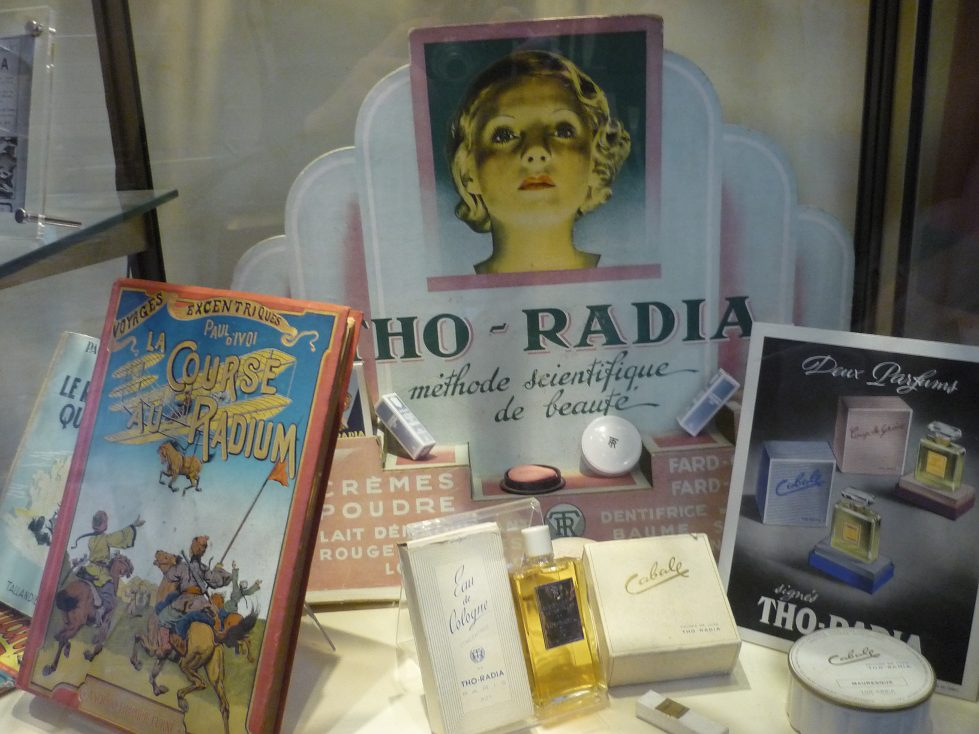
Various Tho-Radia products, with the iconic young blond woman in the background. Musée Curie, Paris

The Second World War forced the company to relocate from Paris to Vichy, where several other pharmaceutical companies were already installed. The Vichy Regime took an interest in the company, and attempted to despoil Jewish stakeholders. However, two of the main stakeholders were from Switzerland, and Swiss ambassador Walter Stucki managed to first delay the ploy, and eventually to derail it entirely.

Business slowed down for Tho-Radia during the war, but from 1948 it gathered momentum against, as Alexis Moussalli and chemist Pierre Corniou developed further products such as skincare beauty milk, perfume and lipstick. At its zenith, the company had between 80 and 90 employees.

=== Decline ===
After Alexis Moussalli died in 1955, his heirs dismissed SECOR administrators, but the company faced increasing competition and lost market shares.

In 1962, the company was sold to Lafarge laboratories, which were in turn purchased by Sanofi in 1976. Lafarge closed the Vichy factory in 1965 and relocated to Châteauroux. With declining sales, the Tho-Radia brand was finally abandoned in 1968.

== Bibliography ==
- "Tho Radia, aventures et mésaventures d'une crème miracle". La Marche des sciences (in French). France Culture. 24 October 2013..
- Thierry Lefebvre; Cécile Raynal (2013). Les métamorphoses de Tho-Radia (in French). Paris: Éditions Glyphe. p. 210. ISBN 978-2-35815-112-2..
- Thierry Lefebvre; Cécile Raynal (2002). "De l'Institut Pasteur à Radio Luxembourg. L'histoire étonnante du Tho-Radia". Revue d'histoire de la pharmacie (in French). 90 (335): 461–480. doi:10.3406/pharm.2002.5401..
