= Doramad Radioactive Toothpaste =

Radioactive toothpaste produced in Germany

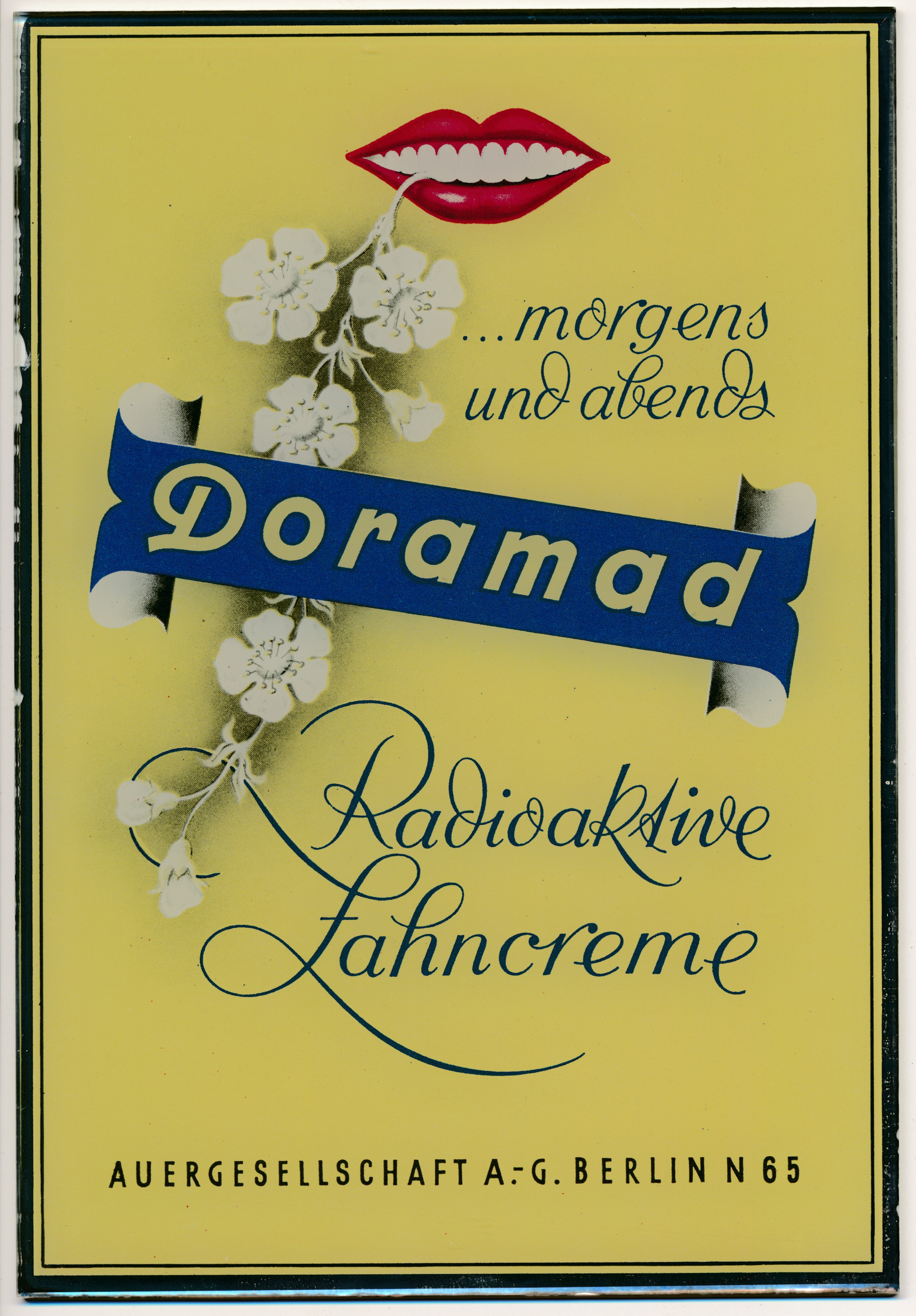
Advertisement for Doramad Radioactive Toothpaste

Doramad Radioactive Toothpaste (Doramad Radioaktive Zahncreme) was a brand of toothpaste produced in Germany by Auergesellschaft of Berlin from the 1920s through World War II. It was known for containing thorium, a radioactive metal, and is an example of radioactive quackery.

== Development ==
The toothpaste was slightly radioactive because it contained small amounts of thorium obtained from monazite sands. Auergesellschaft used thorium and rare-earth elements in making industrial products including mantles for gas lanterns; the toothpaste was produced as a byproduct. Its radioactive content was promoted as imparting health benefits, including antibacterial action and a contribution to strengthening the "defenses of teeth and gums".

According to the manufacturer's marketing materials, it was said to work due to the biological properties of the thorium increasing the circulation of the blood in the gums, destroying germs, and increasing the "life force" in the tissues of the mouth.

== Claims ==
The company promised radiantly white teeth and bacterial extraction due to the ionizing radiation of the radioactive substances. The toothpaste was considered at the time a milestone of technical achievement and was touted as a "miracle remedy". At the time the damage caused by ionizing radiation was not known.

Written on the packaging was:

Besondere biologische Heilwirkungen durch Radium-Strahlen. Tausendfach ärztlich verordnet und empfohlen.

Special biological healing effects by radium rays. A thousand times medically prescribed and recommended.

On the back of the toothpaste tube was the following:

Was leistet Doramad? Durch ihre radioaktive Strahlung steigert sie die Abwehrkräfte von Zahn u. Zahnfleisch. Die Zellen werden mit neuer Lebensenergie geladen, die Bakterien in ihrer zerstörenden Wirksamkeit gehemmt. Daher die vorzügliche Vorbeugungs- und Heilwirkung bei Zahnfleischerkrankungen. Poliert den Schmelz aufs Schonendste weiß und glänzend. Hindert Zahnsteinansatz. Schäumt herrlich, schmeckt neuartig, angenehm, mild u. erfrischend. Ausgiebig im Gebrauch.

What does Doramad do? Through its radioactivity, it increases the defenses of teeth and gums. The cells are charged with a new vigorous life energy, which inhibits bacteria in their destructive ability. Hence the exquisite prevention and healing effect on gum diseases. Polishes enamel to the softest shiny white. Prevents tartar approach. Good foam, new taste, pleasant, mild and refreshing. Use extensively.

== World War II ==
During the German military administration in occupied France during World War II, a group of German scientists stole all the thorium they could while in occupied France. The Allied Alsos Mission thought they were using the heavy elements for the refinement of uranium to be used in an atomic bomb. However, after Allied agents captured and investigated a German chemical company's representative, it was revealed that the scientists were not seeking to develop an atomic bomb at all, but to make thorium toothpaste.

According to physicist Samuel Goudsmit in a 1947 issue of Time, the German chemical company's officials had realized that, at the end of the war, they would no longer be able to make money producing wartime equipment such as gas masks or carbons for searchlights, and they decided cosmetic products would be their best option for future sales. One of the company's officials already had a patent for thorium toothpaste (likely unrelated to Doramad) and, influenced by marketing for Pepsodent "irium" toothpaste in the United States, the company sought to gain a monopoly on all the thorium they could find in order to produce as much thorium toothpaste as they could after the war, which led to the company's scientists stealing all of France's thorium. The identity and fate of the chemical company, the fate of the stolen thorium, and whether or not the thorium toothpaste was actually produced after the war is unknown.

== See also ==
- List of toothpaste brands
- Index of oral health and dental articles
