= Eben Byers =

American amateur golfer (1880–1932)

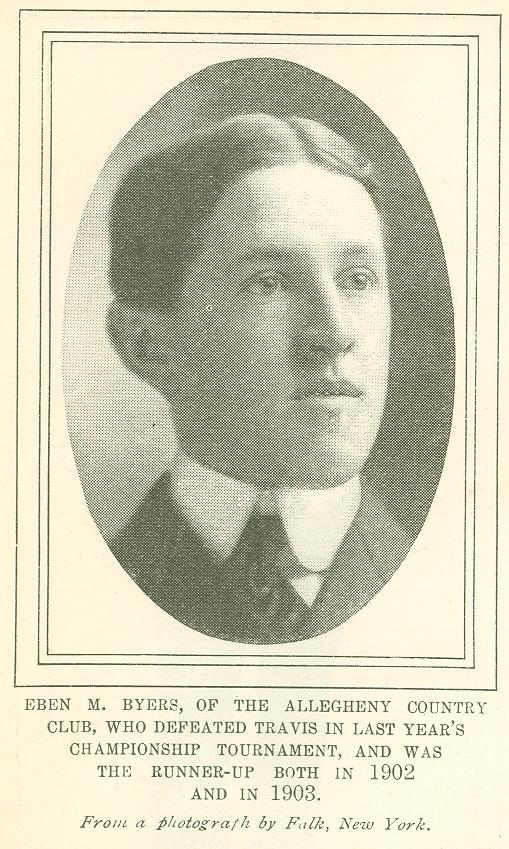
- Byers in 1906

Personal information
- Full name: Ebenezer McBurney Byers
- Nationality: United States
- Born: April 12, 1880 Pittsburgh, Pennsylvania, U.S.
- Died: March 31, 1932 (aged 51) Manhattan, New York, U.S.

Career
- Sport: Golf
- Status: Amateur

Best results in major championships (wins: 1)
- PGA Championship: DNP
- U.S. Open: CUT: 1908
- The Open Championship: DNP
- U.S. Amateur: Won: 1906
- British Amateur: T17: 1904

Ebenezer McBurney Byers (April 12, 1880 – March 31, 1932) was an American socialite, sportsman, and industrialist. He won the 1906 U.S. Amateur in golf. He died from jawbone cancer after consuming 1,400 bottles of Radithor, a patent medicine made from radium salts dissolved in water.

== Biography ==
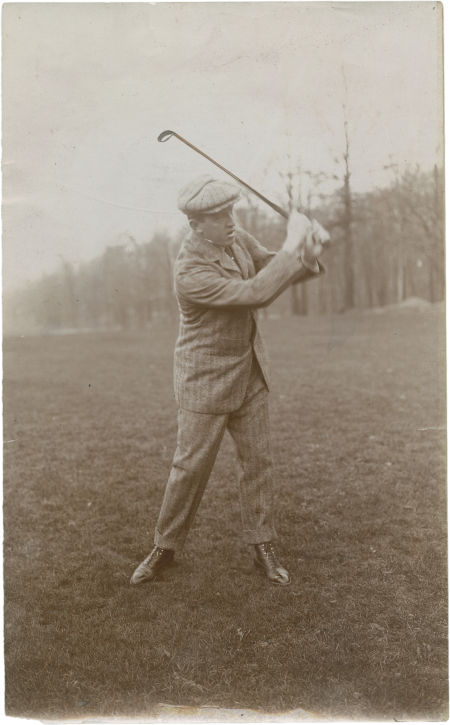
Eben Byers in the 1920s

The son of industrialist Alexander Byers, Eben Byers was educated at St. Paul's School and Yale College. He earned a reputation as a sportsman and played on the Yale Bulldogs golf team. Byers was the U.S. Amateur golf champion of 1906, after finishing runner-up in 1902 and 1903. Byers eventually became the chairman of the Girard Iron Company, which had been created by his father.

In 1927, Byers injured his arm falling from a railway sleeping berth. For the persistent pain, a doctor suggested he take Radithor, a patent medicine manufactured by William J. A. Bailey. Bailey was a Harvard University dropout who falsely claimed to be a doctor of medicine and had become rich from the sale of Radithor, a solution of radium in water which he claimed stimulated the endocrine system. He offered physicians a 1/6 kickback on each dose prescribed.

Byers began taking several doses of Radithor per day, believing it gave him a "toned-up feeling", but stopped in October 1930 (after taking around 1,400 doses) when that effect faded. He lost weight and had headaches, and his teeth began to fall out. In 1931, the Federal Trade Commission asked him to testify about his experience, but he was too sick to travel, so the commission sent a lawyer to take his statement at his home; the lawyer reported that Byers's "whole upper jaw, excepting two front teeth and most of his lower jaw had been removed" and that "All the remaining bone tissue of his body was disintegrating, and holes were actually forming in his skull."

His death on March 31, 1932, was attributed to radium poisoning. Radium is known to emit alpha, beta, and gamma radiation. While alpha radiation has low penetrating ability and typically does not present a danger, ingestion of radium in the form of Radithor allowed accumulation in the bones. Without shielding provided by the skin, the highly ionizing alpha radiation was able to cause localized cell damage on an extreme level, and this is ultimately what led to Byers's cancer and death. He is buried in Allegheny Cemetery in Pittsburgh, Pennsylvania, in a lead-lined coffin.

== Legacy ==
Byers's death received much publicity and it heightened awareness of the dangers of radioactive "cures".

The Federal Trade Commission issued an order against Bailey's business to "cease and desist from various representations theretofore made by them as to the therapeutic value of Radithor and from representing that the product Radithor is harmless". He later founded the "Radium Institute" in New York and marketed a radioactive belt-clip, a radioactive paperweight, and a mechanism which purported to make water radioactive.

After exhuming Byers's body in 1965, MIT physicist Robley Evans estimated Byers's total radium intake as about 1000 μCi (37 MBq), with about half from Ra-226 and the other half from the highly radioactive mesothorium (Ra-228). Dr. Evans also studied radium dial painters and was able to study one whose intake was similar to, but somewhat higher than Byers's.

A pair of photographs widely distributed on the internet supposedly show Byers with a missing lower jaw. However, the photos originated in a book titled Manual of Standard Practice of Plastic and Maxillofacial Surgery by Robert H. Ivy, published by the United States Government in 1942; the book focuses on war injuries and the photographs, purportedly of Byers, appear alongside many images of other serious injuries. The subject of the photos is not identified in the book.

== Major championships ==
=== Amateur wins ===
Year	Championship	Winning score	Runner-up
1906	U.S. Amateur	2 up	(Canada) George Lyon

=== Results timeline ===
Tournament	1900	1901	1902	1903	1904	1905	1906	1907	1908	1909
U.S. Open									CUT	
U.S. Amateur	R16	R16	2	2	R16	QF	1	SF	QF	
The Amateur Championship					R32			R128		
Tournament	1910	1911	1912	1913	1914	1915	1916	1917	1918	1919
U.S. Amateur	R32	R32	R32	R16	R16	R32	R32	NT	NT	DNQ
Tournament	1920	1921	1922	1923	1924	1925	1926			
U.S. Amateur	DNQ						DNQ			

Note: Byers died before the founding of the Masters Tournament, and never played in The Open Championship. As an amateur, he could not play in the PGA Championship.

Win
Top 10
Did not play

NT = No tournament
DNQ = Did not qualify for match play portion
R128, R64, R32, R16, QF, SF = Round in which player lost in match play

Source for U.S. Amateur: USGA Championship Database

Source for 1904 British Amateur: Golf, July 1904, pg. 6.

Source for 1907 British Amateur: The Glasgow Herald, May 29, 1907, pg. 12.

== See also ==
- Albert Stevens
- Radioactive quackery
