= FDA Center for Devices and Radiological Health =

Center of the U.S. Food and Drug Administration

CDRH
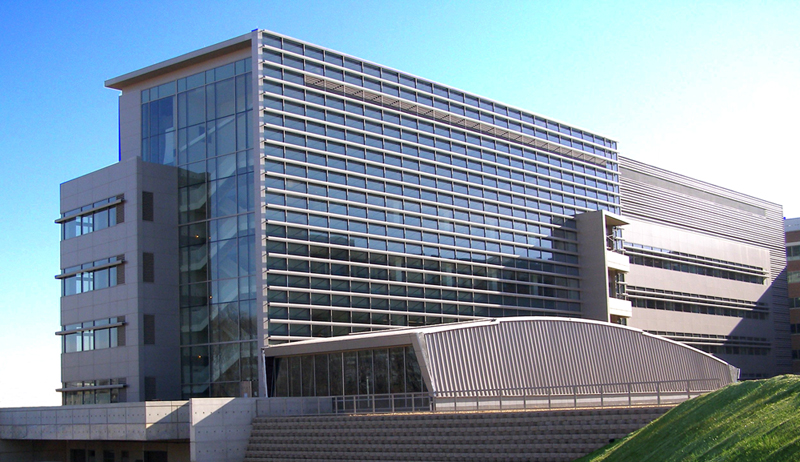
- FDA White Oak Building 62

Center overview
- Formed: 1982
- Preceding agencies: Bureau of Medical Devices; Bureau of Radiological Health
- Jurisdiction: HHS
- Headquarters: White Oak Campus; Silver Spring, MD
- Employees: 2,230 (2023)
- Center executive: Michelle Tarver M.D., Ph.D, Director
- Website: FDA CDRH

The Center for Devices and Radiological Health (CDRH) is one of six product centers of the U.S. Food and Drug Administration (FDA), an agency that is part of the U.S. Department of Health and Human Services (HHS). CDRH is responsible for ensuring that patients and providers in the U.S. have timely and continued access to safe, effective, and high-quality medical devices and safe radiation-emitting products.

Examples of products that CDRH regulates include medical devices ranging from tongue depressors and personal protective equipment (PPE) to pacemakers and robotic surgical systems, and medical and non-medical radiation-emitting electronic products such as lasers, x-ray systems, ultrasound equipment, microwave ovens, and color televisions.

As of October 2024, the director of CDRH is Michelle Tarver M.D., Ph.D.

== Organization structure ==
CDRH consists of seven offices that work in collaboration to assure that consumers have access to safe and effective medical products.

- Office of the Center Director (OCD) provides vision, leadership, and strategic direction to the Center.
- Office of Policy (OP) provides leadership for policy-related activities.
- Office of Strategic Partnership and Technology Innovation (OST) provides leadership for scientific collaborations and emerging technologies.
- Office of Product Evaluation and Quality (OPEQ) assures patients have continued access to high quality, safe, and effective products through the total product life cycle review of medical devices.
- Office of Communication, Information Disclosure, Training and Education (OCITE) manages communication to the public and internal education and training.
- Office of Management (OM) develops and executes the Center's management activities including budget and human resources.
- Office of Science and Engineering Laboratories (OSEL) undertakes regulatory research to promote innovation in the development of new lifesaving medical devices.

=== Office of Product Evaluation and Quality ===
The Office of Product Evaluation and Quality (OPEQ), one of the seven offices in CDRH, is structured to monitor the entirety of a medical product's evolution. Pre-market and post-market teams work together to evaluate the safety and effectiveness of medical devices. OPEQ houses the Office of Health Technologies (OHT), which is further subdivided into 8 offices by device type. Each office performs reviews of products over their lifecycle.

Office of Ophthalmic, Anesthesia, Respiratory, ENT and Dental Devices	OHT1	Examples: contact lenses, snoring/sleep devices, dental ceramics
Office of Cardiovascular Devices	OHT2	Examples: pacemakers, heart valves, ECGs, AEDs
Office of Gastrorenal, ObGyn, General Hospital, and Urology Devices	OHT3	Examples: hemodialysis machines, tampons, IUDs
Office of Surgical and Infection Control Devices	OHT4	Examples: robotic surgery devices, wound care devices
Office of Neurological and Physical Medicine Devices	OHT5	Examples: cerebral stents, BCI devices, cerebral aneurysm clips
Office of Orthopedic Devices	OHT6	Examples: hip replacement implants, orthopedic plates, orthopedic screws
Office of In Vitro Diagnostics	OHT7	Examples: COVID-19 tests, pregnancy tests, HIV diagnostic tests
Office of Radiological Health	OHT8	Examples: MRI machines, x-ray systems, microwaves

== History ==
Medical devices first came under comprehensive regulation with the passage of the Federal Food, Drug, and Cosmetic Act of 1938 (FD&C), which replaced the earlier Pure Food and Drug Act of 1906. The FD&C allowed the FDA to perform factory inspections and prohibited misbranded marketing of cosmetic and therapeutic medical devices.

In the 1970s, Congress responded to the public's desire for additional oversight over medical devices by passing the Medical Device Amendments of 1976 (MDA) to the FD&C. The MDA established a risk-based framework for the classification of medical devices and a regulatory pathway for medical devices to get to the market, created a regulatory pathway for medical device clinical trials, and established several post-market requirements including manufacturer registration and device listing with the FDA, good manufacturing practices (GMPs), and reporting of adverse events.

Another predecessor of CDRH was the Public Health Service's Division of Radiological Health, which was formed in the late 1950s within the Environmental Health Divisions of the Bureau of State Services. In 1970, as part of the Public Health Service reorganizations of 1966–1973, this division was split, with part going to the new Environmental Protection Agency and part moving into FDA.

In 1982, the organizational units at the FDA that regulated medical devices and radiation-emitting products merged to form the Center for Devices and Radiological Health (CDRH).

Former leaders of CDRH:

- Jeffrey Shuren, M.D., J.D., CDRH Director 2009 – 2024
- Daniel Schultz M.D., CDRH Director 2004 – 2009
- David Feigal M.D MPH, CDRH Director 1999 – 2004
- D. Bruce Burlington M.D., CDRH Director 1993 – 1999
- James Benson, CDRH Director 1991 – 1992
- John Villforth, CDRH Director 1982 – 1990 and Bureau of Radiological Health Director 1969 – 1982

=== Medical Device Legislation Milestones ===
- In 1990, Congress passed the Safe Medical Devices Act (SMDA), which authorized the FDA to recall devices that pose a risk to patient safety and created the Humanitarian Use Device program to encourage development of devices targeting rare diseases.
- The 1992 Mammography Quality Standards Act (MQSA) required all mammography facilities to be accredited as meeting quality standards.
- In 1997, the Food and Drug Administration Modernization Act (FDAMA) created the "least burdensome" approach to encourage FDA staff and industry to use the minimum amount of information to address regulatory questions and prevent delays in marketing.
- The 2002 Medical Device User Fee and Modernization Act (MDUFA) first granted FDA the authority to collect user fees from industry to help the FDA improve efficiency, quality, and predictability of medical device submission reviews; the medical device user fee program has been reauthorized several times with the most recent in 2022.
- In 2012, the Food and Drug Administration Safety and Innovation Act (FDASIA) expanded the FDA's authorities and strengthened the Agency's ability to safeguard and advance public health. Among other authorities, FDASIA permitted FDA to publish regulations establishing a Unique Device Identification (UDI) system for medical devices.
- The 2016 21st Century Cures Act codified into law the expedited regulatory review for devices granted breakthrough device designation and clarified how certain categories of medical software can and cannot be regulated as a medical device.
- The 2020 Coronavirus Aid, Relief, and Economic Security Act (CARES Act) enhanced FDA's ability to identify, prevent, and mitigate possible shortages of medical devices by requiring manufacturers to inform FDA of an interruption or permanent discontinuation of manufacturing during a public health emergency.
- In 2022, the new Total Product Life Cycle (TPLC) Advisory Program (TAP) Pilot was established to help innovators navigate the journey from concept to commercialization via MDUFA V of 2022.

== CDRH mission and vision ==
The CDRH vision is that patients in the U.S. have access to high-quality, safe, and effective medical devices. CDRH works diligently to advance and interweave innovation and safety priorities to fulfill the mission of protecting and promoting public health.

=== Strategic priorities ===
In order to maintain and continuously improve the vision for safe and effective medical devices for patients, CDRH regularly develops strategic priorities. The following priorities were established for 2022 – 2025:

- "Promote a Modern and Diverse Workforce: CDRH strives to prepare the organization so it is exceedingly proactive, flexible, resilient, collaborative, and engaged."
- "Enhance Organizational Agility and Resilience: CDRH makes efforts to adapt and redesign business processes, approaches, and policies to anticipate the needs of the future."
- "Advance Health Equity: CDRH aims to advance the development of knowledge and safe and effective technologies to meet the needs of all patients and consumers."

=== CDRH initiatives ===
==== Continuing partnerships with patients ====
- CDRH advances the collection of scientific evidence about patient experience through the Patient Science and Engagement Program, and more recently with the creation of the Division for Patient-Centered Development. CDRH proactively integrates these patient perspectives into the entirety of medical device review. CDRH promotes patient-centric clinical trials and the use of patient-reported outcome (PRO) data to foster access to new devices that meet patients' needs. As of 2024, PROs were included in 52% of authorizations with clinical studies, with 34% using PROs as the primary and secondary clinical endpoints.
- CDRH created the Patient Engagement Advisory Committee (PEAC), the first and only advisory committee whose members are all patients, caregivers, and patient advocates. This advisory committee has held 7 meetings since 2017 and has provided recommendations on complex issues, including patient engagement in clinical trial design and conduct, use of patient-generated health data in post-market surveillance, communications about medical devices, such as communications regarding cybersecurity vulnerabilities, AR/VR and AI/ML in medical devices, and most recently advancing health equity in medical devices in 2023.
- CDRH provides patients and caregivers with an opportunity to share their experiences living with a condition or using medical devices with CDRH staff through the Patient and Caregiver Connection. There are approximately 20 Patient and Caregiver Connection Partner Organizations reflecting different medical specialties and cross-cutting topics. Partners include The Michael J. Fox Foundation, Breakthrough T1D, and Mended Hearts.
- Collaborative Communities bring public and private sector members together to address health care challenges. CDRH currently participates in 17 collaborative communities, including the National Evaluation System for Health Technology Coordinating Center (NESTcc) Collaborative Community (NESTcc) that aims to strategically leverage real-world evidence in the innovation of medical devices and the Heart Valve Collaboratory (HVC) to help patients with heart valve disease achieve their fullest potential for health.

==== Initiatives to encourage innovation and collaboration with innovators ====
- The Breakthrough Devices Program and Safer Technologies Program (STeP) programs facilitate timely access to life-saving devices by expediting regulatory review. Devices granted a designation qualify for priority review and active engagement of senior management. CDRH has authorized over 100 devices through the Breakthrough Devices Program since program launch in 2015 and 2 devices through the STeP Program since program launch in 2021.
- The Safety and Performance Based Pathway Program ensures better quality devices on the market by allowing innovators to assess devices against performance criteria as opposed to outdated predicates. This option is available for 10 device areas for which guidances have been published.
- The Digital Health Center of Excellence (DHCoE) empowers interested parties to advance health care by fostering responsible and high-quality digital health innovation. The DHCoE provides centralized expertise and serves as a resource for digital health technologies and policy for digital health innovators, the public, and FDA staff. More than 700 AI/ML-enabled devices have been authorized since the center's launch in 2020.
- In early 2023, CDRH launched the Total Product Life Cycle Advisory Program (TAP) under MDUFA V to proactively help innovators navigate the journey from concept to commercialization. To date, there are 50 cardiovascular, neurological, and physical medicine devices participating in TAP. CDRH intends to enroll more innovators and their devices across a broader range of clinical disciplines, with a goal of enrolling up to 325 by 2027.
- The use of peer-reviewed Regulatory Science Tools (RSTs) allows innovators to efficiently navigate the design and redesign loop and expedite medical device innovation. The tools include methods, models, datasets and clinical outcome assessments based on the most innovative science. There are currently more than 150 tools in the catalog, with more than 20 new tools added every year. To date, more than 1,250 premarket submissions covering over 500 different product codes have cited use of RSTs.
- In 2024, CDRH launched the groundbreaking Home as a Healthcare Hub initiative to reimagine healthcare delivery and facilitate the adoption of devices that will establish the home as an integral part of the healthcare system. CDRH is co-creating a prototype home model with an architectural firm, patient groups, healthcare providers, and the medical device industry. This home prototype is necessary to facilitate meaningful innovation in home use devices by jump starting the community in conversation. The prototype is anticipated to be completed in late 2024.

==== Initiatives to encourage safety and quality ====
- Based on a 2011 report concluding that firms that proactively manage risks have fewer complaints and investigations, and often have lower quality-related costs, FDA launched the Case for Quality Program (CfQ). CfQ includes various initiatives and pilots to further CDRH's goal of improving device quality, including the Voluntary Improvement Program (VIP), in which participating companies continue to show a downward trend in medical device recalls.
- Globally, CDRH fosters quality and enables harmonization of quality management system requirements across regulatory jurisdictions. In early 2024, FDA issued a final rule amending the device current good manufacturing requirements to align more closely with the international consensus standards set by International Organization for Standardization (ISO).
- Established during the COVID-19 public health emergency, the Office of Supply Chain Resilience (OSCR) within OST strengthens public health supply chains by proactively working with manufacturers, distributors, health care providers and other interested parties to prevent and mitigate shortages and improve the resiliency of the U.S. medical device supply chain.
- Cybersecurity threats to the healthcare sector may lead to patient harm as a result of delay in diagnoses and/or treatment. The CDRH cybersecurity vision is to protect patient safety by strengthening medical device resiliency to cybersecurity threats. CDRH provides manufacturers with recommendations to integrate cybersecurity throughout the medical device design process and simultaneously issues safety communications to the public about cybersecurity vulnerabilities when needed.

==== Initiatives to enhance regulatory flexibility ====
- CDRH continues to strengthen and streamline the clinical trial program to make it more attractive for industry to perform studies in the U.S. such that patients have earlier access to innovative technologies. Since 2009 CDRH has decreased the median time to clinical trial (Investigational Device Exemption) authorization by 90%.
- CDRH strives to promote the use of Real-World Date and Evidence (RWE) in place of conventional clinical trial data to reduce time to answer important device questions. CDRH has authorized more than 100 devices using RWE.

=== Criticism of CDRH's regulatory procedures ===
In 1993, the U.S. House of Representatives' Subcommittee on Oversight and Investigations of its Committee on Energy and Commerce issued a report entitled "Less Than The Sum Of Its Parts". The report identified a number of continued organizational and structural weaknesses that had made CDRH unable to either adequately protect the public from unsafe devices or to approve useful and safe devices in a reasonable period of time. The subcommittee's chairman, John Dingell, later recalled "We put a large number of FDA people in jail." A 2010 review of CDRH's regulatory procedures subsequently contended that, among other things, the agency's reviews of medical devices had a lower approval standard than their drug counterparts, excessively relied upon a fast-track process, and failed to conduct Congressionally-mandated device classifications.
