= Regulatory affairs =

Profession

Regulatory affairs (RA), is a profession that deals with an organization’s adherence to regulatory compliance.

It is a position mostly found within regulated industries, such as pharmaceuticals, medical devices, cosmetics, agrochemicals (plant protection products and fertilizers), energy, banking, telecom etc. Regulatory affairs also has a very specific meaning within the healthcare industries (pharmaceuticals, medical devices, biologics and functional foods).

Regulatory affairs professionals, also known as regulatory compliance professionals, usually have responsibility for the following general areas:

- Ensuring that their companies comply with all of the regulations and laws pertaining to their business.
- Working with federal, state, and local regulatory agencies and personnel on specific issues affecting their business, i.e., working with such agencies as the Food and Drug Administration or European Medicines Agency (pharmaceuticals and medical devices); The Department of Energy; or the Securities and Exchange Commission (banking).
- Advising their companies on the regulatory aspects and climate that would affect proposed activities. i.e. describing the "regulatory climate" around issues such as the promotion of prescription drugs and Sarbanes-Oxley compliance.

Offices of Regulatory Affairs at many companies and organizations are known for collaborating with their company’s Offices of Government Relations, Public Relations, Legal-General Counsel, and others to accomplish their goals.

== Healthcare RA ==
The regulatory function in healthcare industries is vital in making safe and effective healthcare products available worldwide. Individuals who ensure regulatory compliance and prepare submissions, as well as those whose main job function is clinical affairs or quality assurance are all considered regulatory professionals. The most significant responsibility of a regulatory professional in an export company is to get a product successfully registered and approved by the health agency of the country like FDA (Food and Drug Administration) for USA, or EMA (European Medicines Agency) for Europe.

Regulatory professionals are employed in industry, government and academia and are involved with a wide range of products, including:

- pharmaceuticals
- medical devices
- in vitro diagnostics
- biologics and biotechnology
- nutritional products
- cosmetics
- veterinary products

The regulatory professional's roles and responsibilities often begin in the research and development phases, moving into clinical trials and extending through premarket approvals, manufacturing, labeling and advertising and postmarket surveillance.

=== Core competencies ===
Regulatory professionals come from diverse backgrounds. Most regulatory professionals have earned a bachelor's degree, and more than half have an advanced degree, most often in a scientific or technical field. In addition, regulatory professionals usually have experience in other careers before transitioning into regulatory affairs.

Although there are some university degree and graduate certificate programs in regulatory affairs and related areas, experience is a key asset for regulatory professionals. Valuable skills include project management and organization, negotiation and communication, and the ability to learn from the experience of others, both inside and outside the organization.

Continuing education and professional development are critical to the regulatory professional. Regulatory professionals must keep up to date with regulatory policies and procedures for one or more countries, as well as maintain an understanding of the scientific and technical background of healthcare products. Global aspects of regulatory affairs are taken up by organisations such as the Drug Information Association (DIA) and the International Conference on Harmonisation of Technical Requirements for Registration of Pharmaceuticals for Human Use (ICH).

=== History ===
The healthcare industries were the first to be significantly regulated in the modern era. Much of this regulation has stemmed from avoiding the repetition of disasters, and has tended to be led by the USA due to size of the market and its technological lead:

- Diphtheria epidemic led to 1902 Biologics Control Act
- Publication of The Jungle by Upton Sinclair led to 1906 Pure Food and Drugs Act
- Elixir of sulfanilamide led to the 1938 Food Drug and Cosmetic Act
- Thalidomide led to the 1962 Kefauver Harris Amendments
- Dalkon shield led to the 1976 Medical Device Amendments
- Bjork-Shiley heart valves led to the 1990 Safe Medical Devices Act

In the US, this regulation is largely written directly into law and codified in Title 21 of the Code of Federal Regulations

=== Recent developments ===
Starting in 1980 the European Union started to harmonize the regulation of healthcare products in the member states. The concept of regulating medicines was well established in most member countries along similar lines to the US model, but many countries did not have any significant medical device regulation. Concurrently the EU had been developing the concept of New Approach Directives where only broad concepts were written into the law and the bulk of the technological detail delegated to compliance with recognized standards (which are more readily update-able).

The Europeans took the radical approach of applying the New Approach Directive to Medical Devices and by doing so made the first significant conceptual advance in healthcare regulation for nearly 100 years.

The European Model for medical device has largely been adopted by the Global Harmonization Task Force as the international template.

=== Future developments ===
Many in the regulatory affairs profession believe the new approach to regulation will eventually be adopted for all healthcare products as it represents the best model for delivering new healthcare advances to market in a reasonable time with acceptable safety.

Regulatory affairs departments are growing within companies. Due to the changing resources necessary to fulfill the regulatory requirements, some companies also choose to outsource or outtask regulatory affairs to external service providers. Regulatory affairs department is constantly evolving and growing and is the one which is least impacted during the acquisition and merger, and also during recession. Global harmonization in standards has led to consistent approach in regulatory submissions and hence its review.

=== Regulatory affairs profession ===
The (healthcare) regulatory affairs profession is still an emergent profession but has a few major international professional membership organizations:

- Drug Information Association, DIA, http://www.diahome.org
- The Regulatory Affairs Professionals Society, RAPS, http://www.raps.org
- The Organisation for Professionals in Regulatory Affairs, TOPRA, http://www.topra.org
- Vietnam Regulatory Affairs: https://vnras.com/
- Association of Regulatory Affairs Professionals: ARAP
- Certified Clinical Research Professionals: CCRP

which offer education and training, professional development, competence certification and codes of ethics.

The regulatory professional typically has a background relevant to the business in which they work, i.e., science, medicine, or engineering.
