= Jeffrey Shuren =

U.S. Food and Drug Administration official

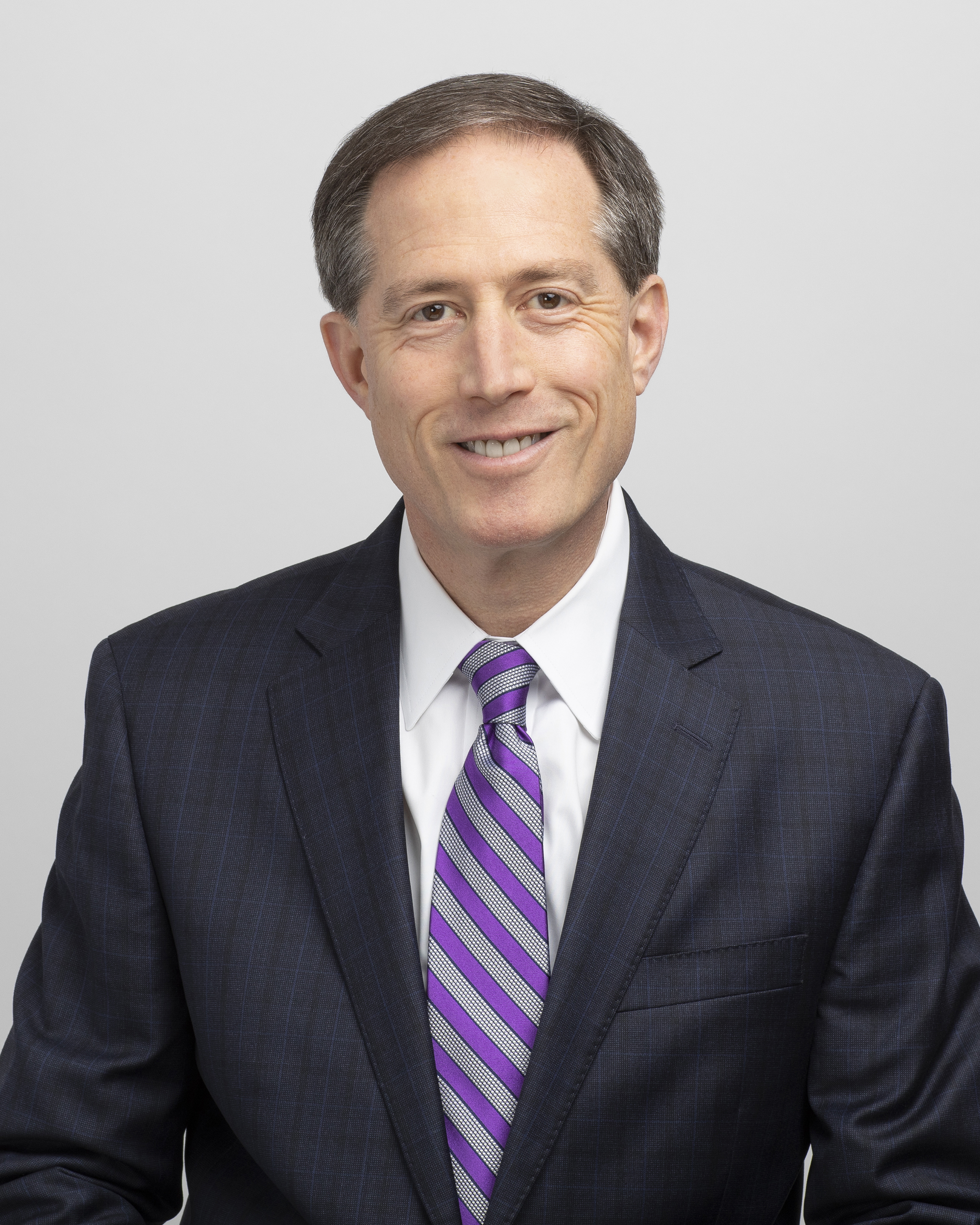
Jeffrey Shuren

Jeffrey Shuren is an American healthcare executive. He holds M.D. and J.D. degrees, and was the director of the Center for Devices and Radiological Health (CDRH) at the U.S. Food and Drug Administration (FDA) from September 2009 to July 2024.

He had previously served at the FDA in a variety of positions since 1998. From 2001 through 2003 he was the director of the Division of Items and Devices in the Coverage and Analysis Group at the Centers for Medicare & Medicaid Services, where he oversaw the development of Medicare's national coverage determinations for drugs, biologics, and non-implantable medical devices.

== Education, academic career, and publications ==
Shuren received a B.S. in Medicine in 1985, and an M.D. in 1987, both from Northwestern University.

He completed his medical internship at Beth Israel Hospital in Boston, his residency in neurology at Tufts New England Medical Center, and a fellowship in behavioral neurology and neuropsychology at the University of Florida.

Shuren joined the University of Cincinnati College of Medicine's Department of Neurology as an assistant professor; he led two active memory disorders clinics and implemented a research program in Alzheimer's disease and disorders of higher cognitive function.

He received a J.D. from the University of Michigan, in 1998.

Shuren has published a number of research studies on neurology, and on medical devices, regulatory concerns, and other subjects.

== Administrative career ==
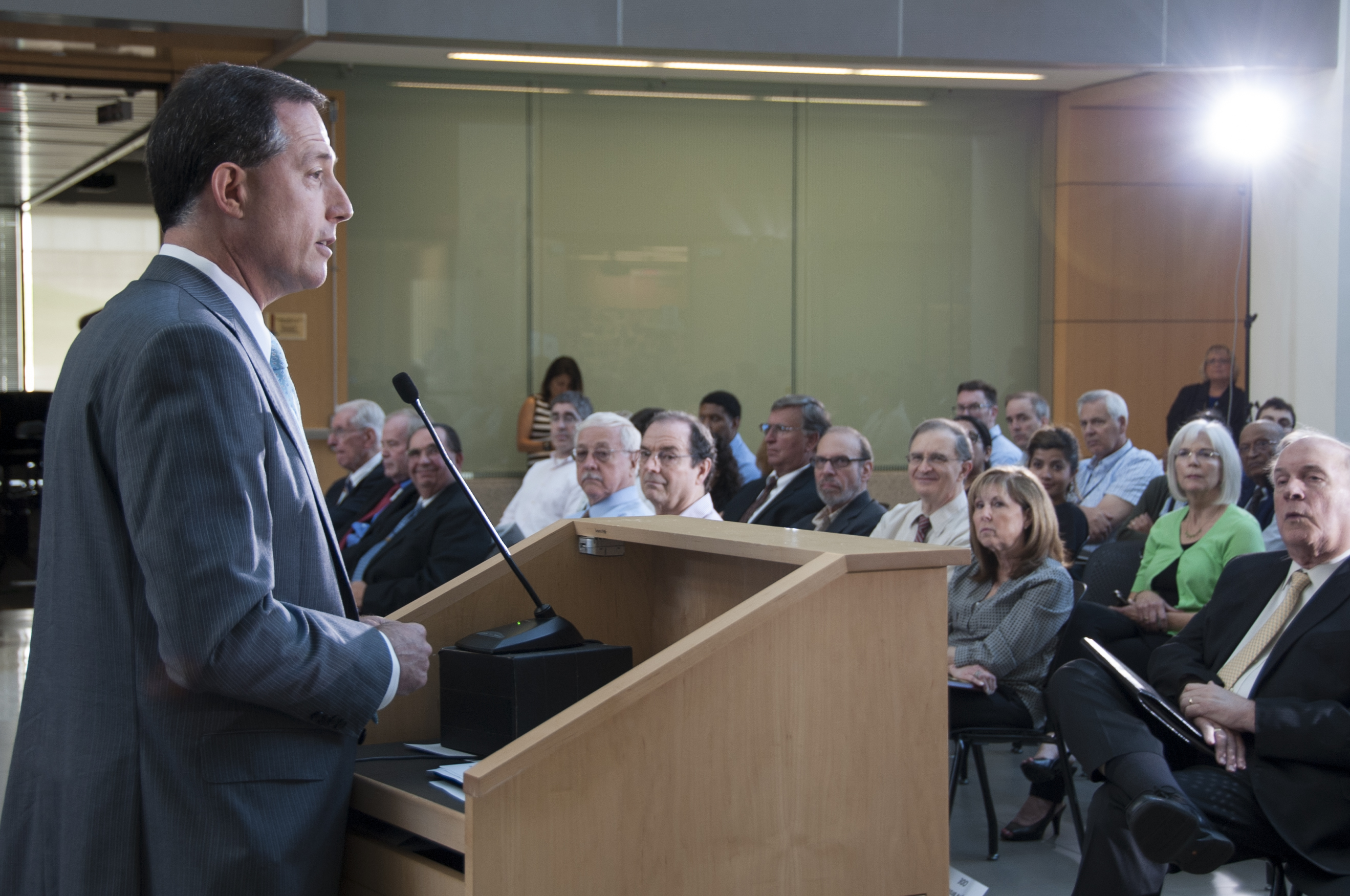
Shuren speaking at the FDA's Celebration of the 40th Anniversary of the Medical Device Amendments, in 2016

Shuren joined the FDA in 1998 as a medical officer in the Office of Policy, Planning, and Legislation, a position he held until 2001.

From 1999 through 2000, he also served as a detailee on Senator Edward Kennedy's staff on the Senate Health, Education, Labor, and Pensions (HELP) Committee.

From 2001 to 2003, Shuren was the director of the Division of Items and Devices in the Coverage and Analysis Group at the Centers for Medicare & Medicaid Services. In this position he oversaw the development of Medicare's national coverage determinations for drugs, biologics, and non-implantable devices.

From 1998 to 2003, he also served as a staff volunteer in the National Institutes of Health's National Institute of Neurological Disorders and Stroke Cognitive Neuroscience Section, supervising and designing clinical studies on human reasoning.

He returned to the FDA as the assistant commissioner for Policy in 2003. He was subsequently associate commissioner for Policy and Planning from March 2008 through August 2009, special counsel to the principal deputy commissioner from March 2009 to September 2009, and acting deputy commissioner for Policy, Planning, and Budget in August 2009.

Shuren became the acting director of the FDA's Center for Devices and Radiological Health (CDRH) in September 2009, and was appointed the permanent director in January 2010. The CDRH is responsible for assuring the safety, effectiveness, and quality of medical devices, assuring the safety of radiation-emitting products such as cell phones and microwaves, and fostering device innovation. He led an office with about 2,500 staff members and a budget of about $790 million, overseeing thousands of devices, ranging from tests to detect blood-lead levels to IV infusion pumps to ventilators.

During his tenure as head of CDRH, Shuren was credited with speeding the pace of medical device approvals, and with solidifying the U.S. as a destination for medical device study and innovation. Under Shuren, annual new device approvals more than tripled by 2018, while warnings letters to device manufacturers about product safety and quality issues fell roughly 80 percent. During his tenure, implementation of a required Unique Device Identification (UDI) for all internal medical devices was achieved.

In 2018, Shuren reorganized the structure of the CDRH to improve and streamline product evaluations, surveillance, and inspections. During his tenure, the CDRH launched new regulatory initiatives, and Shuren was also credited with establishing a variety of additional forums, consortiums, systems, and technology.

Shuren announced his plans to retire from the FDA in July 2024.

== Conflict of interest controversy ==
On August 20, 2024,The New York Times published an article asserting that Shuren had repeatedly refrained from recusing himself from cases where his spouse, Allison W. Shuren, represented the medical technology firm. Ms. Shuren was serving as "the co-leader of a team of lawyers at Arnold & Porter, one of Washington's most powerful law firms". The cases included the well-known episode of fraud at Theranos, as well as cases involving cancer attributed to breast implants made by Allergan, and issues involving LASIK vision-correction surgery. The article quoted a source claiming that reports of device-related injuries rose to 900,000 in 2023, up from about 190,000 in 2012. An FDA spokesperson told the Times that the FDA had noted an increase in device-injury reports in 2018, which it attributed to companies doing "'a better job reporting problems and fixing them due to a continued, concerted effort by the FDA to drive greater device safety.'" The Times article also reported the sources of income in the Shuren family, based on a financial disclosure form filed by Jeffery Shuren in 2018: "Ms. Shuren earned from $1 million to $5 million ... Dr. Shuren’s F.D.A. salary is $400,000 a year."

The Times also reported a response from the FDA, saying "Dr. Shuren has been advised of the need to exercise greater caution in matters concerning his recusal obligations and will be provided additional administrative support to better ensure future compliance."
