= New York State Restaurant Association v. New York City Board of Health =

American legal case

- Court: United States Court of Appeals for the Second Circuit
- Full case name: New York State Restaurant Association v. New York City Board of Health
- Decided: Pending

Holding
- Pending

New York State Restaurant Association v. New York City Board of Health is a case decided by the Second Circuit United States Court of Appeals. The case arose after New York City passed a law in January 2007 to become the first American city to require restaurant chains to state the number of calories in everything on their menus. The New York State Restaurant Association (NYSRA) sued, arguing infringement of commercial freedom of speech under the First Amendment. The NYSRA also argued that the Nutrition Labeling and Education Act (NLEA) of 1990 and FDA regulations preempted New York's calorie posting regulation. The Second Circuit rejected all of the Restaurant Association's claims and upheld the New York City law. Congressman Henry Waxman, who was the NLEA's chief sponsor, joined an amicus brief in support of New York City's position and was represented by Public Citizen Litigation Group.
