= Food and Drug Administration Revitalization Act =

- Long title: An Act to amend the Federal Food, Drug, and Cosmetic Act to revitalize the Food and Drug Administration, and for other purposes.
- Nicknames: Food and Drug Administration Revitalization Act of 1990
- Enacted by: the 101st United States Congress
- Effective: November 28, 1990

Citations
- Public law: 101-635
- Statutes at Large: 104 Stat. 4583

Codification
- Acts amended: Federal Food, Drug, and Cosmetic Act
- Titles amended: 21 U.S.C.: Food and Drugs
- U.S.C. sections amended: 21 U.S.C. ch. 9 § 301 et seq.; 21 U.S.C. ch. 9, subch. VII §§ 379b, 379c, 379d; 21 U.S.C. ch. 9, subch. X § 394

Legislative history
- Introduced in the Senate as S. 845 by Orrin G. Hatch (R–UT) on April 19, 1989; Committee consideration by Committee on Labor and Human Resources and House Committee on Energy and Commerce; Passed the Senate on October 25, 1990 (passed); Passed the House on October 27, 1990 (agreed by voice vote); Signed into law by President George H. W. Bush on November 28, 1990

The Food and Drug Administration Revitalization Act was introduced by the 101st Congress of the United States. Senator Orrin G. Hatch was the chairperson sponsor of the federal revitalization amendment for the Food and Drug Administration.

The FDA revitalization was orchestrated by Commissioner of Food and Drugs Dr. David Kessler in pursuant of the congressional authorization permissible by 101st Senate bill 845;

== Elements of Food and Drug Administration Revitalization ==
- Digital transformation and Information technology harmonizing FDA as information agency
- Enforcement programs streamlined by contingencies of FDA field activities
- Establishment of Office of Criminal Investigations
- New drug approval process funding by prescription drug user fee
- Progressive domestic and imports investigation programs by FDA
- Proposed rule for regulation of tobacco by U.S. FDA
- Quality standards for mammography facilities endorsed by Mammography Quality Act
- Reduction in application, IND, and NDA review times for healthcare products
- Safety information and adverse event reporting program ― MedWatch
- Standardization of nutrition facts label as authorized by Nutrition Labeling Act

The Title 21 amendment was signed into law on November 28, 1990, by President George H. W. Bush.

== Provisions of the Act ==
The Food and Drug Administration Revitalization Act of 1990 was penned with four legislative titles establishing a medium for the rejuvenation of the public health agency.

Title I: Administrative and Laboratory Facility Consolidation - 21 U.S.C. § 379b

General Services Administration provided authority to grant contracts for consolidated Food and Drug Administration facilities. The contracts shall be granted for the design, construction, and operation of consolidated Food and Drug Administration facilities.

Title II: Recovery and Retention of Fees for FOIA Requests - 21 U.S.C. § 379c

Charge fees shall be applied to recover reasonable costs incurred in processing Freedom of Information requests for records obtained or created under this Act.

Title III: Scientific Review Groups - 21 U.S.C. § 394

Technical and scientific review groups shall be established as needed to perform functions of the Food and Drug Administration.

Title IV: Automation of FDA - 21 U.S.C. § 379d

Agency shall automate appropriate activities of the Food and Drug Administration to ensure timely review of regulatory activities under this Act.

== Observations of U.S. Government Accountability Office ==
- "Efforts To Speed Up the Drug Review Process". U.S. GAO ~ Asset 116350. United States General Accountability Office. September 16, 1981.
- "Speeding Up the Drug Review Process: Results Encouraging but Progress Slow". U.S. GAO ~ HRD-82-16. United States General Accountability Office. November 23, 1981.
- "Food and Drug Administration: Insufficient Planning for Field Laboratory Consolidation Decisions" (PDF). U.S. GAO ~ HRD-88-21. United States Government Accountability Office. December 4, 1987.
- "FDA's Reviews of New Drugs: Changes Needed in Process for Reviewing and Reporting on Clinical Studies". U.S. GAO ~ HRD-88-100. United States General Accountability Office. September 12, 1988.
- "Drug Misuse: Anabolic Steroids and Human Growth Hormone". U.S. GAO ~ HRD-89-109. United States General Accountability Office. August 18, 1989.
- "FDA Resources: Comprehensive Assessment of Staffing, Facilities, and Equipment Needs" (PDF). U.S. GAO ~ HRD-89-142. United States Government Accountability Office. September 15, 1989.
- "FDA Drug Review: Postapproval Risks 1976-1985". U.S. GAO ~ PEMD-90-15. United States General Accountability Office. April 26, 1990.
- "FDA Laboratories: Magnitude of Benefits Associated With Consolidation Is Questionable" (PDF). U.S. GAO ~ HEHS-96-30. United States Government Accountability Office. March 19, 1996. OCLC 34612714.
- "Financial Management: FDA's Controls Over Property Have Improved, But Weaknesses Remain" (PDF). U.S. GAO ~ AIMD-99-51. United States Government Accountability Office. February 22, 1999. OCLC 40986237.
- "Food Safety: U.S. Needs a Single Agency to Administer a Unified, Risk-Based Inspection System". U.S. GAO ~ T-RCED-99-256. United States General Accountability Office. August 4, 1999.
- "Food and Drug Administration: Status of Actions to Address Property Control Weaknesses" (PDF). U.S. GAO ~ AIMD-99-257R. United States Government Accountability Office. August 10, 1999. OCLC 42583474.

== Supplementary Resources ==
- Benson, James S (January 1991). "Remarks by the Deputy Commissioner of Food and Drugs". Food, Drug, Cosmetic Law Journal. 46 (1). Food and Drug Law Institute: 27–29. JSTOR 26659272.
- Benson, James S (July 1990). "State of the Food and Drug Administration". Food, Drug, Cosmetic Law Journal. 45 (3). Food and Drug Law Institute: 301–317. JSTOR 26659048.
- Benson, James S (May 1990). "Improving the Generic Drug Regulatory System". Food, Drug, Cosmetic Law Journal. 45 (3). Food and Drug Law Institute: 207–217. JSTOR 26659239.
- Hatch, Orrin G (April 1983). "Areas for Change in the Food and Drug Laws". Food, Drug, Cosmetic Law Journal. 38 (2). Food and Drug Law Institute: 97–102. JSTOR 26658496.
