= Paul Kent (actor) =

American actor

- Kent in front of the Melrose Theater in 1975
- Born: Paul Inglese; October 13, 1930; Brooklyn, New York, U.S.
- Died: October 7, 2011 (aged 80); Hollywood Hills, California, U.S.
- Occupation: Actor
- Years active: 1956–2011

Paul Kent (October 13, 1930 – October 7, 2011) was an American actor and the founder and artistic director of the Melrose Theatre in West Hollywood.

== Biography ==
=== Early life ===
Kent was born as Paul Inglese on October 13, 1930, in Brooklyn, New York. He studied acting at the Pasadena Playhouse and briefly served in the United States Army during the Korean War. In 1958, he and his parents moved from New York to California, where he trained under Sanford Meisner and later assisted Meisner with his classes. The two became close friends and colleagues during Meisner's life, and when Meisner left Los Angeles to go back to New York, he left his teaching methods to be carried on in the West by Kent who consequently taught acting for many years through his theater.

Kent played a part in the formation of Lucille Ball's Desilu Workshop, where he became the first acting student signed by the workshop. According to Hedda Hopper, when Kent appeared at the workshop to help a female friend at an audition, he was discovered by Ball and promptly signed to an actor-stage manager contract. Kent's acting roles during this period included a small part in an episode of December Bride in 1957.

=== Acting instruction ===
In 1964, Kent founded the Melrose Theater, in the city of West Hollywood, with the assistance of fellow actors including Tom Troupe, Carole Cook, Richard Bull and Don Eitner. Funds for the theater were partially raised by a guest appearance with Lucille Ball and Gary Morton on Password.

Kent later recalled in an interview with The Los Angeles Times:

I was scared to death. I wasn't working steadily, I didn't know where the next rent would come from, and I had no experience in building a theater...I bought seats from a defunct movie house on Washington Boulevard. I'll never forget. Two dollars a seat. Linden Chiles and the students and I literally unbolted the seats from the floor and brought them back here.

In 1976, Kent entered into a partnership with workshop organizer Jomarie Ward to purchase a former bakery and photographer's studio at 733 North Seward Street, a half block north of Melrose Avenue, in the Hollywood neighborhood of Los Angeles. With the assistance of Ward and members of the workshop, the building was renovated and converted to the new Melrose Theater in 1977. The new, larger theater became the permanent headquarters of the Melrose, with Kent installed as artistic director and Ward as managing director.

In 1984, Kent decided to create a production employing the largest possible number of Melrose actors, and convened several playwrights at the Mark Taper Forum to write a play in a bar setting to be produced by the theater. The resulting collaboration, The Bar Off Melrose, was credited to fifteen playwrights and employed nearly forty actors. The play premiered successfully in 1986, and is still performed today at various theaters, drama workshops and colleges.

=== Acting career ===
While serving as artistic director of the Melrose Theater, Kent also acted in many of its plays, and continued acting in film and television. One of Kent's acting appearances in the 1970s was a small part in the television miniseries Helter Skelter. The part was notable because Kent later played a different character in the 2004 adaptation directed by John Gray. Gray later bought Kent back to play a spirit in the episode "Mended Hearts", of his TV seriesGhost Whisperer. In addition, Kent often played different characters in multiple episodes of a series, including his appearances in Lou Grant, T. J. Hooker and Falcon Crest.

In 1982, Kent portrayed Commander Beach, the helmsman and third-in-command of the Starship USS Reliant in Star Trek II: The Wrath of Khan. When the ill-fated starship was commandeered by Ricardo Montalbán's Khan, the character of Beach would be marooned on a desolate planet along with the majority of the ship's crew until rescued by the USS Enterprise.

In 1987 Kent played Harry M. Daugherty in a biographical TV movie of J. Edgar Hoover, produced by Showtime. In 1999, he became the third actor to play the character of Doctor Noel Clinton in Port Charles, a spinoff of General Hospital, succeeding actors Dean Harens and Ron Husmann. He had a lead starring role as the character of Miles Mason in Viagra Falls, a television pilot. One of his final acting roles was his portrayal of Mack Sennett in Return to Babylon, an independent film released in 2013.

In 1975, Kent reflected on his craft to Los Angeles Times reporter Lawrence Christon:

Acting is my sanity, the thing I run to when things go wrong in my life. My special joy is rehearsing, making discoveries about the ins and outs of character. I love it so much that the actual performance, to me, is like the cigarette after the affair.

=== Personal life ===
Kent was the father of several children. At the time of his death he was married to actress and author Madelyn Cain.

=== Death ===
Kent died on October 7, 2011, six days before his 81st birthday, in Hollywood Hills, California, from multiple myeloma. He was buried in Forest Lawn Memorial Park in Hollywood Hills.

== Partial filmography ==
=== Film ===
Title	Character	Year	Notes
1956	Diane	Groom	uncredited
1966	Seconds	Party Guest	uncredited
1973	The Mad Bomber	Dr. Devincy	
1976	Lifeguard	Jack Gilmore	
1977	Ruby	Louie	
1982	Star Trek II: The Wrath of Khan	Commander Beach	
1985	Perfect	Judge	
1987	A Nightmare on Elm Street 3: Dream Warriors	Doctor Carver	
1987	Programmed to Kill	Carlson	
1988	Double Revenge	Judge	
1989	The Jigsaw Murders	Captain Matt Ludwig	
2003	The Road Home	Coach Dale	
2013	Return to Babylon	Mack Sennett	black-and-white silent film

=== Television ===
Year(s)	Title	Character(s)	Notes
1963	My Three Sons	Announcer	Episode: "Bub's Butler"
1963	The Outer Limits	Detective	Episode: "The Man with the Power"
1966	Mission: Impossible	Frederico	Episode: "Elena" (uncredited)
1967	The Man from U.N.C.L.E.	Valandros's Aide	Episode: "The Master's Touch Affair"
1968	Hawaii Five-O	David Milner	Episode: "Strangers In Our Own Land"
1970	Bonanza	Doctor Martin	Episode: "The Night Virginia City Died"
1972	The Astronaut	Carl Samuels	ABC Movie of the Week
1972	Family Flight	First Controller	ABC Movie of the Week
1973	The Alpha Caper	John Woodbury	ABC Movie of the Week
1974	Pray for the Wildcats	Doctor Harris	ABC Movie of the Week
1974	The Six Million Dollar Man	Flight Surgeon Wolf	Episode: "The Rescue of Athena One"
1976	Helter Skelter	Dennis Ranson	TV movie
1977	Starsky & Hutch	Lieutenant Anderson	Episode: "The Plague: Part 1"
1979, 1981	Three's Company	Alvin Morrell, Doctor Anderson	2 episodes: "Jack Moves Out", "Professor Jack"
1980, 1982	Diff'rent Strokes	Judge Roscoe C. Briggs, Chief Scott	2 episodes: "Small Claims Court", "Fire"
1981	The Dukes of Hazzard	Mister Hodges	Episode: "Cletus Falls In Love"
1987	J. Edgar Hoover	Harry M. Daugherty	TV movie
1990	Doogie Howser, M.D.	Philip Leonetti	Episode: "Doogenstein"
1993	Coach	Mister Burrows	Episode: "Vegas Odds"
1994	Frasier	Doctor Sternstein	Episode: "Burying a Grudge"
1997	High Incident	Steven Carlisle	Episode: "Knock Knock"
1997	The Practice	Judge Skully	Episode: "Trial And Error" (uncredited)
1999	Boy Meets World	Tourist #1	Episode: "The Honeymooners"
2003	The West Wing	Cardinal Patrick	Episode: "Inauguration: Part I"
2004	ER	Mister Morgan	Episode: "Get Carter"
2004	Helter Skelter	Van Nuys Judge	TV movie
2005	Ghost Whisperer	Patient	Episode: "Mended Hearts"
