= Medical device regulation =

Medical device regulation may refer to:

- Regulation (EU) 2017/745 in the European Union
- Medical Device Regulation Act of 1976 in the United States
