= Nutrition Labeling and Education Act of 1990 =

US law

- Long title: To amend the Federal Food, Drug, and Cosmetic Act to prescribe nutrition labeling for foods, and for other purposes.
- Acronyms (colloquial): NLE Act, "NL&E Act"
- Enacted by: the 101st United States Congress
- Effective: November 8, 1990

Citations
- Public law: 101-535
- Statutes at Large: 104 Stat. 2353

Codification
- Acts amended: Federal Food, Drug, and Cosmetic Act
- Titles amended: 21 U.S.C.: Food and Drugs
- U.S.C. sections amended: Chapter 9 § 301

Legislative history
- Introduced in the House as H.R. 3562 by Henry Waxman (D–CA) on October 31, 1989; Committee consideration by House Committee on Energy and Commerce; Passed the House on July 30, 1990 (passed voice vote); Passed the Senate on October 24, 1990 (passed voice vote) with amendment; House agreed to Senate amendment on October 26, 1990 (passed voice vote); Signed into law by President George H. W. Bush on November 8, 1990

United States Supreme Court cases
- New York State Restaurant Association v. New York City Board of Health

The Nutrition Labeling and Education Act (NLEA) (Public Law 101-535) is a 1990 United States Federal law. It was signed into law on November 8, 1990 by President George H. W. Bush.

The law gives the Food and Drug Administration (FDA) authority to require nutrition labeling of most foods regulated by the Agency; and to require that all nutrient content claims (for example, 'high fiber', 'low fat', etc.) and health claims meet FDA regulations. The act did not require restaurants to comply with the same standards.

The regulations became effective for health claims, ingredient declarations, and percent juice labeling on May 8, 1993 (but percent juice labeling was exempted until May 8, 1994).

Effective Jan. 1, 2006, the Nutrition Facts Labels on packaged food products are required by the FDA to list how many grams of trans fatty acid (trans fat) are contained within one serving of the product.

== Dietary Supplement Act of 1992 ==
Senator Orrin Hatch of Utah introduced the Health Freedom Act of 1992 which would have blocked the FDA from using health claims as a reason to regulate dietary supplements as drugs. The senator said he "entered the controversy after hearing from constituents in his home state, including both consumers and makers of dietary supplements". Hatch stated that the FDA "can put anybody out of business if they want to." Hatch's bill did not get very far, but it encouraged Congress to pass the Dietary Supplement Act of 1992 (Public Law 102-571), which blocked the FDA from applying its forthcoming labeling rules for conventional foods to dietary supplements for another year, until the end of 1993.

The Nutritional Health Alliance, an industry lobby group, claimed credit for getting the Dietary Supplement Act of 1992 passed.

== Title 21 and Guidelines ==
=== Enforcement and Standards ===
When forming nutritional guidelines, it is done with the intention to give consumers information about the nutritional content of the food products they are consuming. Due to this goal, companies are held to a standard of nutritional analysis that is enforced by the FDA and is a requirement for businesses, with the exemption of small businesses, to sell food products. The primary law that creates this standard is Title 21 in the Code of Federal Regulations, and a majority of the rules for food labels are found in chapter I. In accordance with this, businesses must send their products for nutrition analysis, and label their products with the following list of food components: fat, saturated fat, cholesterol, total carbohydrate, sodium, dietary fiber, protein, and added sugars. These are considered to be the necessary macronutrients and micronutrients for people to form a healthy diet. Along with this information, it is also required for calories to be included which is the most important consideration for dieting. For clarity, this title was established by the federal government, however the enforcement and altering of this chapter is done by the FDA. With this information, it is expected that people will be able to use their own due diligence and judgment to consume an acceptable amount of food. However, due to concerns of cost and the current technology available for nutritional analysis, there is an acceptable difference between a foods’ actual nutritional content and the measurements shown on food labels. Specifically, these standards come from the allowed margin of error and rounding enabled by the FDA. According to the guidelines, there is an allowed twenty percent margin of error for all of the nutrient measurements. Additionally, measurements are able to be rounded based on the specific nutrient with the most significant rounding occurring with calories. Specifically, items with anything under five calories can be labeled as zero, items under fifty calories can be rounded to the nearest increment of 5, and items with over fifty calories can be rounded to the nearest increment of ten. Additionally, the possible difference can also depend on whether or not a multi-serving product is labelled with a total serving measurement as well. If it is not, the possible difference would also be multiplied with the standard serving size, in the end producing a different estimate than that of a total serving product label. While this may not be an issue in the eyes of general consumers, it does deviate from the original goal of creating nutrition labels.

==== Current Circumstances ====
To further understand this, it is important to consider the underlying reason for this issue. The current standard of nutritional analysis comes in various forms of chemical testing. With such testing, there are significant costs that can make distribution difficult for businesses. If a business were to choose software-based analysis, which is cheaper but inaccurate, it would cost around $100 to $300 for testing. According to Medallion Labs, a full panel of laboratory based chemical testing costs around $1800. This is reflective of general pricing for such analysis with most costing around $2000. With this number itself is significant, any attempts to make testing more accurate would most likely lead to raising costs. This would mean that businesses would most likely need to raise prices and in turn general consumers would face higher costs for a reason that doesn’t benefit or apply to them. To quickly note, a National Health and Nutrition Examination Survey conducted in 2001 found that only fifty percent of Americans tried to control their weight at some point in the year, and of them only thirty-six percent "switched to food with lower calories". While this survey is rather old, it goes to show that the general consumer is likely not focused on the in depth accuracy of a nutritional label. However, this issue is overshadowed by the existing limitations of nutrition analysis technology. For example, the methods used to test protein content is through the nitrogen content of a food product. This opens up the possibility for labels to contain a protein content that is higher than the product actually is due to added nitrogen content. This is one of the main reasons for the current system to be improved as reducing the possibility for "consumer confusion" is one of the primarily goals of nutritional labelling. Therefore, with the current state of guidelines and testing technology, there are limitations on how effective nutrition labelling and improvement would likely come with unintended cost consequences on an industry wide level.

== See also ==
- Dietary Supplement Health and Education Act of 1994
- Food Guide Pyramid
- New York State Restaurant Association v. New York City Board of Health
