= Infant Formula Act of 1980 =

- Long title: An Act to amend the Federal Food, Drug, and Cosmetic Act to strengthen the authority under that Act to assure the safety and nutrition of infant formulas, and for other purposes.
- Acronyms (colloquial): IFA
- Enacted by: the 96th United States Congress

Citations
- Public law: Pub. L. 96–359
- Statutes at Large: 94 Stat. 1190

Codification
- Acts amended: Pub. L. 75–717, 52 Stat. 1040, Chap. 675
- Titles amended: 21 U.S.C.: Food and Drugs
- U.S.C. sections created: 21 U.S.C. ch. 9, subch. IV § 350a
- U.S.C. sections amended: 21 U.S.C. ch. 9, subch. II § 321(z)

Legislative history
- Introduced in the House as H.R. 6940 by Henry Waxman (D-CA) on March 26, 1980; Committee consideration by House Energy and Commerce, Senate Health, Education, Labor, and Pensions; Passed the House on May 20, 1980 (388-15); Passed the Senate on September 8, 1980 (Passed, in lieu of S. 2490) with amendment; House agreed to Senate amendment on September 9, 1980 (Agreed); Signed into law by President Jimmy Carter on September 26, 1980

Major amendments
- Anti-Drug Abuse Act of 1986

Infant Formula Act of 1980, 21 U.S.C. § 350a, is a United States statute authorizing good manufacturing practices and infant food safety for infant formula packaged and labeled in the United States. The Act of Congress amended the Federal Food, Drug, and Cosmetic Act creating section 350a under subchapter IV entitled as Food.

The United States administrative law endorsed a nutrient composition standard promoting human nutrition. The neonatal nutritive composition was incipiently affirmed by the American Academy of Pediatrics in 1967. The infant formula standard proposal orchestrated regulatory provisions for adequate nutrient levels as suitable for toddler nutrition.

The H.R. 6940 bill was passed by the 96th U.S. Congressional session and signed into law by U.S. President Jimmy Carter on September 26, 1980.

== FDA Nutritive Fortification of Federal Register ==
- 31 FR 15730
- 47 FR 17016
- 45 FR 17206
- 47 FR 18832
- 45 FR 86362
- 54 FR 3783
- 47 FR 2331
- 56 FR 66566

== Infant Formula and Pediatrics Supplementals ==
- "Commentary on Breast-Feeding and Infant Formulas, Including Proposed Standards for Formulas". Pediatrics. 57 (2). American Academy of Pediatrics: 278–285. February 1976. doi:10.1542/peds.57.2.278. ISSN 1098-4275.
- "Infant Formulas". FDA Drug Bulletin. Rockville, Maryland: U.S. Department of Health, Education, and Welfare. November 1979. p. 30 – via HathiTrust Digital Library.
- "The Dietary Chloride Deficiency Syndrome". Pediatrics. 66 (3). American Academy of Pediatrics: 366–374. September 1980. doi:10.1542/peds.66.3.366. ISSN 1098-4275.
- "New Infant Formula Additives Approved by FDA". AAP News. 20 (5). American Academy of Pediatrics: 209–210. May 2002. ISSN 1556-3332.

== See also ==
- 1977 Nestlé boycott
- Child Nutrition Act
- 2008 Chinese milk scandal
- Nutrition facts label
- 2022 United States infant formula shortage
- Regulatory Flexibility Act
- AOAC International
- United States Senate Select Committee on Nutrition and Human Needs
