= United States v. Park =

- Supreme Court of the United States

Argued March 18–19, 1975 Decided June 9, 1975
- Full case name: United States v. Park
- Docket no.: 74-215
- Citations: 421 U.S. 658 (more) 95 S. Ct. 1903; 44 L. Ed. 2d 489; 1975 U.S. LEXIS 69

Holding
- Even if there is no affirmative wrongdoing, the manager of a corporation can be prosecuted under the Federal Food, Drug, and Cosmetic Act.

Court membership
- Chief Justice Warren E. Burger Associate Justices William O. Douglas · William J. Brennan Jr. Potter Stewart · Byron White; Thurgood Marshall · Harry Blackmun; Lewis F. Powell Jr. · William Rehnquist

Case opinions
- Majority: Burger, joined by Douglas, Brennan, White, Blackmun, Rehnquist
- Dissent: Stewart, joined by Marshall, Powell

United States v. Park, 421 U.S. 658 (1975), was a case in the Supreme Court of the United States which held the Chief Executive Officer of a company may be criminally liable for contaminating food in violation of the Federal Food, Drug, and Cosmetic Act.

Sections 402 and 301 of the Act prohibited adulterating food held for sale in interstate commerce. Park was the CEO of Acme Markets, Inc. In 1971, the FDA notified Acme and Park that a 12-day inspection revealed insanitary conditions and vermin contamination.

Park failed to comply with a mandate from the FDA, under the Federal Food, Drugs, and Cosmetics Act, to keep conditions within his warehouses legally sanitary.

In the case, the Court found Park strictly liable for the unsanitary conditions that his company had created, arguing for strict liability under the rationale that the Federal Food, Drugs, and Cosmetics Act was a 'public welfare' statute. The Court concluded that as a welfare statute, the purpose was to prevent egregious social harm; therefore, the Defendant could be held strictly liable for the crime.

The Court held that if someone were to willingly be in charge of a company, and therefore its problems, then he or she willingly accepts the consequences of any illegal practices that his or her company or organization is involved in. An exception is made if the problem is impossible to fix.

== See also ==
- List of United States Supreme Court cases
- Lists of United States Supreme Court cases by volume
- List of United States Supreme Court cases by the Burger Court
- United States v. Dotterweich
