= Radiation Control for Health and Safety Act of 1968 =

- Long title: An Act to amend the Public Health Service Act to provide for the protection of the public health from radiation emissions from electronic products.
- Acronyms (colloquial): RCHSA
- Enacted by: the 90th United States Congress
- Effective: October 18, 1968

Citations
- Public law: 90-602
- Statutes at Large: 82 Stat. 1173

Codification
- Titles amended: 42 U.S.C.: Public Health and Social Welfare
- U.S.C. sections amended: 42 U.S.C. ch. 6A §§ 262-263a; 42 U.S.C. ch. 23 § 2011 et seq.; 42 U.S.C. ch. 23 § 2021

Legislative history
- Introduced in the House as H.R. 10790 by Paul Rogers (D–FL) on March 12, 1968; Committee consideration by House Interstate and Foreign Commerce; Passed the House on March 20, 1968 (382-0); Passed the Senate on October 3, 1968 (passed voice vote, in lieu of S. 2067); Reported by the joint conference committee on October 10, 1968; agreed to by the House on October 11, 1968 (agreed voice vote) and by the Senate on October 11, 1968 (agreed voice vote); Signed into law by President Lyndon B. Johnson on October 18, 1968

Radiation Control for Health and Safety Act of 1968 was an amendment to the Public Health Service Act mandating performance standards for electronic products suspectible of electromagnetic radiation or radiation emissions. The United States statute established provisions involving research and development programs for the studies of electromagnetic shielding, ionizing radiation, non-ionizing radiation, and exposure assessment to humans.

The Act of Congress was recodified to Title 21 from Title 42 with the passage of the Safe Medical Device Amendments of 1990. The electronic product radiation control provisions are authorized for administrative law purposes by the Federal Food, Drug, and Cosmetic Act.

The H.R. 10790 legislation was passed by the 90th United States Congressional session and enacted into law by the 36th President of the United States Lyndon B. Johnson on October 18, 1968.

== Declaration of Radiation Control Safety Act ==
=== U.S. Congressional Statement of Purpose ===
Congress declares that the public health and safety must be protected from the dangers of electronic product radiation. Thus, it is the purpose of this subpart to provide for the establishment by the Secretary of an electronic product radiation control program which shall include the development and administration of performance standards to control the emission of electronic product radiation from electronic products and the undertaking by public and private organizations of research and investigation into the effects and control of such radiation emissions.

=== Definitions ===
As used in this subpart —

(1) Electronic Product Radiation means —

(A) Any ionizing or non-ionizing electromagnetic or particulate radiation
(B) Any sonic, infrasonic, or ultrasonic wave, which is emitted from an electronic product as the result of the operation of an electronic circuit in such product

(2) Electronic Product means —

(A) Any manufactured or assembled product which, when in operation

(i) Contains or acts as part of an electronic circuit
(ii) Emits (or in the absence of effective shielding or other controls would emit) electronic product radiation

(B) Any manufactured or assembled article which is intended for use as a component, part, or accessory of a product and which when in operation emits (or in the absence of effective shielding or other controls would emit) such radiation

(3) Manufacturer means any person engaged in the business of manufacturing, assembling, or importing of electronic products
(4) Commerce means —

(A) Commerce between any place in any State and any place outside thereof
(B) Commerce wholly within the District of Columbia

(5) State includes the District of Columbia, the Commonwealth of Puerto Rico, the Virgin Islands, Guam, and American Samoa
(6) Secretary means the Secretary of Health, Education, and Welfare, and the term 'Department' means the Department of Health, Education, and Welfare

=== Electronic Product Radiation Control Program ===
(a) The Secretary shall establish and carry out an electronic product radiation control program designed to protect the public health and safety from electronic product radiation. As a part of such program, Secretary shall —

(1) Develop and administer performance standards for electronic products
(2) Plan, conduct, coordinate, and support research, development, training, and operational activities to minimize the emissions of and the exposure of people to, unnecessary electronic product radiation
(3) Maintain liaison with and receive information from other Federal and State departments and agencies with related interests, professional organizations, industry, industry and labor associations, and other organizations on present and future potential electronic product radiation
(4) Study and evaluate emissions of, and conditions of exposure to, electronic product radiation and intense magnetic fields
(5) Develop, test, and evaluate the effectiveness of procedures and techniques for minimizing exposure to electronic product radiation
(6) Consult and maintain liaison with the United States Secretary of Commerce, the United States Secretary of Defense, the United States Secretary of Labor, the United States Atomic Energy Commission, and other appropriate Federal departments and agencies on —

(A) Techniques, equipment, and programs for testing and evaluating electronic product radiation
(B) Development of performance standards to control such radiation emissions .

(b) In carrying out the purposes of this Act, the Secretary is authorized to —

(1) As used in this subpart —

(A) Collect and make available, through publications and other appropriate means, the results of, and other information concerning, research and studies relating to the nature and extent of the hazards and control of electronic product radiation
(B) Make such recommendations relating to such hazards and control as the Secretary considers appropriate

(2) Make grants to public and private agencies, organizations, and institutions, and to individuals for the purposes stated
(3) Contract with public or private agencies, institutions, and organizations, and with individuals, without regard to the Revised Statutes of the United States
(4) Procure (by negotiation or otherwise) electronic products for research and testing purposes, and sell or otherwise dispose of such products

(c) In carrying out the purposes of this Act, it is authorized to —

(1) Each recipient of assistance records to grants or contracts entered into under other than competitive bidding procedures shall keep such records as the Secretary shall prescribe, including records which fully disclose the amount and disposition by such recipient of the proceeds of such assistance, the total cost of the project or undertaking in connection with which such assistance is given or used, and the amount of that portion of the cost of the project or undertaking supplied by other sources, and such other records as will facilitate an effective audit
(2) The Secretary and the Comptroller General of the United States, or any of their duly authorized representatives, shall have access for the purpose of audit and examination to any books, documents, papers, and records of the recipients that are pertinent to the grants or contracts entered into under this subpart under other than competitive bidding procedures.

=== Studies by the Secretary ===
(a) The Secretary shall conduct the following studies, and make a report or reports of the results of such studies to the Congress on or before January 1, 1970, and from time to time thereafter as he may find necessary, together with such recommendations for legislation as the Secretary may deem appropriate:
(1) A study of present State and Federal control of health hazards from electronic product radiation and other types of ionizing radiation, which study shall include, but not be limited to —

(A) Control of health hazards from radioactive materials other than materials regulated under the Atomic Energy Act of 1954
(B) Any gaps and inconsistencies in present controls
(C) The need for controlling the sale of certain used electronic products, particularly antiquated X-ray equipment, without upgrading such products to meet the standards for new products or separate standards for used products
(D) Measures to assure consistent and effective control of the aforementioned health hazards
(E) Measures to strengthen radiological health programs of State governments
(F) The feasibility of authorizing the Secretary to enter into arrangements with individual States or groups of States to define their respective functions and responsibilities for the control of electronic product radiation and other ionizing radiation

(2) A study to determine the necessity for the development of standards for the use of nonmedical electronic products for commercial and industrial purposes
(3) A study of the development of practicable procedures for the detection and measurement of electronic product radiation which may be emitted from electronic products manufactured or imported prior to the effective date of any applicable standard established pursuant to this subpart
(b) In carrying out these studies, the Secretary shall invite the participation of other Federal departments and agencies having related responsibilities and interests, State governments — particularly those of States which regulate radioactive materials under the Atomic Energy Act of 1954, as amended, and interested professional, labor, and industrial organizations. Upon request from congressional committees interested in these studies, the Secretary shall keep these committees currently informed as to the progress of the studies and shall permit the committees to send observers to meetings of the study groups
(c) The Secretary or designee shall organize the studies and the participation of the invited participants as the Secretary deems best. Any dissent from the findings and recommendations of the Secretary shall be included in the report if so requested by the dissenter

=== Performance Standards for Electronic Products ===
(a) In carrying out the purposes of this Act, it is authorized to —

(1) The Secretary shall by regulation prescribe performance standards for electronic products to control the emission of electronic product radiation from such products if the Secretary determines that such standards are necessary for the protection of the public health and safety. Such standards may include provisions for the testing of such products and the measurement of their electronic product radiation emissions, may require the attachment of warning signs and labels, and may require the provision of instructions for the installation, operation, and use of such products. Such standards may be prescribed from time to time whenever such determinations are made, but the first of such standards shall be prescribed prior to January 1, 1970. In the development of such standards, the Secretary shall consult with Federal and State departments and agencies having related responsibilities or interests and with appropriate professional organizations and interested persons, including representatives of industries and labor organizations which would be affected by such standards, and shall give consideration to —

(A) The latest available scientific and medical data in the field of electronic product radiation
(B) The standards currently recommended by

(i) Other Federal agencies having responsibilities relating to the control and measurement of electronic product radiation
(ii) Public or private groups having an expertise in the field of electronic product radiation

(C) The reasonableness and technical feasibility of such standards as applied to a particular electronic product
(D) The adaptability of such standards to the need for uniformity and reliability of testing and measuring procedures and equipment
(E) In the case of a component, or accessory, the performance of such article in the manufactured or assembled product for which it is designed

(2) The Secretary may prescribe different and individual performance standards, to the extent appropriate and feasible, for different electronic products so as to recognize their different operating characteristics and uses
(3) The performance standards prescribed under this section shall not apply to any electronic product which is intended solely for export if

(A) Such product and the outside of any shipping container used in the export of such product are labeled or tagged to show that such product is intended for export
(B) Such product meets all the applicable requirements of the country to which such product is intended for export

(4) The Secretary may by regulation amend or revoke any performance standard prescribed under this section
(5) The Secretary may exempt from the provisions of this section any electronic product intended for use by departments or agencies of the United States provided such department or agency has prescribed procurement specifications governing emissions of electronic product radiation and provided further that such product is of a type used solely or predominantly by departments or agencies of the United States.

(b) The provisions of subchapter II of chapter 5 of Title 5 of the United States Code (relating to the administrative procedure for rulemaking), and of chapter 7 of such title (relating to judicial review), shall apply with respect to any regulation prescribing, amending, or revoking any standard prescribed under this section.
(c) Each regulation prescribing, amending, or revoking a standard shall specify the date on which it shall take effect which, in the case of any regulation prescribing, or amending any standard, may not be sooner than one year or not later than two years after the date on which such regulation is issued, unless the Secretary finds, for good cause shown, that an earlier or later effective date is in the public interest and publishes in the Federal Register the reason for such finding, in which case such earlier or later date shall apply.
(d) In carrying out the purposes of this Act, it is authorized to —

(1) In the case of actual controversy as to the validity of any regulation issued under this section prescribing, amending, or revoking a performance standard, any person who will be adversely affected by such regulation when it is effective may at any time prior to the sixtieth day after such regulation is issued file a petition with a United States courts of appeals for the circuit wherein such person resides or has a principal place of business, for a judicial review of such regulation. A copy of the petition shall be forthwith transmitted by the clerk of the court to the Secretary or other officer designated by the Secretary for that purpose. The Secretary thereupon shall file in the court the record of the proceedings on which the Secretary based the regulation, as provided in section 2112 of Title 28 of the United States Code.
(2) If the petitioner applies to the court for leave to adduce additional evidence, and shows to the satisfaction of the court that such additional evidence is material and that there were reasonable grounds for the failure to adduce such evidence in the proceeding before the Secretary, the court may order such additional evidence (and evidence in rebuttal thereof) to be taken before the Secretary, and to be adduced upon the hearing, in such manner and upon such terms and conditions as to the court may seem proper. The Secretary may modify findings, or make new findings, by reason of the additional evidence so taken, and the Secretary shall file such modified or new findings, and the Secretary's recommendations, if any, for the modification or setting aside of original regulation, with the return of such additional evidence.
(3) Upon the filing of the petition referred to in this subsection, the court shall have jurisdiction to review the regulation in accordance with chapter 7 of title 5 of the United States Code and to grant appropriate relief as provided in such chapter.
(4) The judgment of the court affirming or setting aside, in whole or in part, any such regulation of the Secretary shall be final, subject to review by the Supreme Court of the United States upon certiorari or certification as provided in section 1254 of title 28 of the United States Code.
(5) Any action instituted under this subsection shall survive, not-withstanding any change in the person occupying the office of Secretary or any vacancy in such office.
(6) The remedies provided for in this subsection shall be in addition to and not in substitution for any other remedies provided by law.

(e) A certified copy of the transcript of the record and administrative proceedings under this section shall be furnished by the Secretary to any interested party at the Secretary's request, and payment of the costs thereof, and shall be admissible in any criminal, exclusion of imports, or other proceeding arising under or in respect of this subpart, irrespective of whether proceedings with respect to the regulation have previously been initiated or become final under this section.
(f) As used in this subpart —

(1) In carrying out the purposes of this Act, it is authorized to —

(A) The Secretary shall establish a Technical Electronic Product Radiation Safety Standards Committee (hereafter in this subpart referred to as the 'Committee') which the Secretary shall consult before prescribing any standard under this section. The Committee shall be appointed by the Secretary, after consultation with public and private agencies concerned with the technical aspect of electronic product radiation safety, and shall be composed of fifteen members each of whom shall be technically qualified by training and experience in one or more fields of science or engineering applicable to electronic product radiation safety, as follows:

(i) Five members shall be selected from governmental agencies, including State and Federal Governments
(ii) Five members shall be selected from the affected industries after consultation with industry representatives
(iii) Five members shall be selected from the general public, of which at least one shall be a representative of organized labor

(B) The Committee may propose electronic product radiation safety standards to the Secretary for consideration. All proceedings of the Committee shall be recorded and the record of each such proceeding shall be available for public inspection

(2) Members of the Committee who are not officers or employees of the United States shall, while attending meetings or conferences of the Committee or otherwise engaged in the business of the Committee, be entitled to receive compensation at a rate fixed by the Secretary, but not exceeding $100 per diem (including travel time), and while away from their homes or regular places of business they may be allowed travel expenses, including per diem in lieu of subsistence, as authorized in section 5703 of title 5 of the United States Code for persons in the Government service employed intermittently. Payments under this subsection shall not render members of the Committee officers or employees of the United States for any purpose.

(g) The Secretary shall review and evaluate on a continuing basis programs carried out by industry to assure the adequacy of safeguards against hazardous electronic product radiation and to assure that electronic products comply with standards prescribed under this section.
(h) Every manufacturer of an electronic product to which is applicable a standard in effect under this section shall furnish to the distributor or dealer at the time of delivery of such product, in the form of a label or tag permanently affixed to such product or in such manner as approved by the Secretary, the certification that such product conforms to all applicable standards under this section. Such certification shall be based upon a test, in accordance with such standard, of the individual article to which it is attached or upon a testing program which is in accord with good manufacturing practice and which has not been disapproved by the Secretary (in such manner as the Secretary shall prescribe by regulation) on the grounds that it does not assure the adequacy of safeguards against hazardous electronic product radiation or that it does not assure that electronic products comply with the standards prescribed under this section.

=== Notification of Defects In, and Repair or Replacement, of Electronic Products ===
(a) In carrying out the purposes of this Act, it is authorized to —

(1) Every manufacturer of electronic products who discovers that an electronic product produced, assembled, or imported by the manufacturer has a defect which relates to the safety of use of such product by reason of the emission of electronic product radiation, or that an electronic product produced, assembled, or imported by the manufacturer on or after the effective date of an applicable standard prescribed and fails to comply with such standard, shall immediately notify the Secretary of such defect or failure to comply if such product has left the place of manufacture and shall with reasonable promptness furnish notification (except as authorized by paragraph (2)) of such defect or failure to the persons (where known to the manufacturer) specified in subsection (b) of this section.
(2) If, in the opinion of such manufacturer, the defect or failure to comply is not such as to create a significant risk of injury, including genetic injury, to any person, manufacturer may, at the time of giving notice to the Secretary of such defect or failure to comply, apply to the Secretary for an exemption from the requirement of notice to the persons specified in subsection (b). If such application states reasonable grounds for such exemption, the Secretary shall afford such manufacturer an opportunity to present the manufacturer's views and evidence in support of the application, the burden of proof being on the manufacturer. If, after such presentation, the Secretary is satisfied that such defect or failure to comply is not such as to create a significant risk of injury, including genetic injury, to any person, the Secretary shall exempt such manufacturer from the requirement of notice to the persons specified in subsection (b) of this section and from the requirements of repair or replacement imposed by subsection (f) of this section.

(b) The notification (other than to the Secretary) required shall be accomplished —

(1) By certified mail to the first purchaser of such product for purposes other than resale, and to any subsequent transferee of such product
(2) By certified mail or other more expeditious means to the dealers or distributors of such manufacturer to whom such product was delivered

(c) The notifications required shall contain a clear description of such defect or failure to comply with an applicable standard, an evaluation of the hazard reasonably related to such defect or failure to comply, and a statement of the measures to be taken to repair such defect. In the case of a notification to a person, the notification shall also advise the person of her/his rights under subsection (f) of this section.
(d) Every manufacturer of electronic products shall furnish to the Secretary a true or representative copy of all notices, bulletins, and other communications to the dealers or distributors of such manufacturer or to purchasers (or subsequent transferees) of electronic products of such manufacturer regarding any such defect in such product or any such failure to comply with a standard applicable to such product. The Secretary shall disclose to the public so much of the information contained in such notice or other information obtained as the Secretary deems will assist in carrying out the purposes of this subpart, but shall not disclose any information which contains or relates to a trade secret or other matter referred to in Title 18 of the United States Code unless the Secretary determines that it is necessary to carry out the purposes of this subpart.
(e) If through testing, inspection, investigation, or research carried out pursuant to this subpart, or examination of reports submitted, or otherwise, the Secretary determines that any electronic product —

(1) Does not comply with an applicable standard prescribed in this Act
(2) Contains a defect which relates to the safety of use of such product by reason of the emission of electronic product radiation; the Secretary shall immediately notify the manufacturer of such product of such defect or failure to comply. The notice shall contain the findings of the Secretary and shall include all information upon which the findings are based. The Secretary shall afford such manufacturer an opportunity to present the Secretary's views and evidence in support thereof, to establish that there is no failure of compliance or that the alleged defect does not exist or does not relate to safety of use of the product by reason of the emission of such radiation hazard. If after such presentation by the manufacturer the Secretary determines that such product does not comply with an applicable standard prescribed pursuant of this Act, or that it contains a defect which relates to the safety of use of such product by reason of the emission of electronic product radiation, the Secretary shall direct the manufacturer to furnish the notification specified in subsection (c) of this section to the persons (where known to the manufacturer), unless the manufacturer has applied for an exemption from the requirement of such notification on the ground specified and the Secretary is satisfied that such noncompliance or defect is not such as to create a significant risk of injury, including genetic injury, to any person.

(f) If any electronic product is found under subsection (a) or (e) to fail to comply with an applicable standard prescribed under this subpart or to have a defect which relates to the safety of use of such product, and the notification specified in subsection (c) is required to be furnished on account of such failure or defect, the manufacturer of such product shall

(1) Without charge, bring such product into conformity with such standard or remedy such defect and provide reimbursement for any expenses for transportation of such product incurred in connection with having such product brought into conformity or having such defect remedied.
(2) Replace such product with a like or equivalent product which complies with each applicable standard prescribed under this subpart and which has no defect relating to the safety of its use.
(3) Make a refund of the cost of such product. The manufacturer shall take the action required by this subsection in such manner, and with respect to such persons, as the Secretary by regulations shall prescribe.

(g) This section shall not apply to any electronic product that was manufactured before the date of the enactment of this subpart.

=== Imports ===
(a) Any electronic product offered for importation into the United States which fails to comply with an applicable standard prescribed under this subpart, or to which is not affixed a certification in the form of a label or tag in conformity with this Act shall be refused admission into the United States. The United States Secretary of the Treasury shall deliver to the Secretary of Health, Education, and Welfare, upon the latter's request, samples of electronic products which are being imported or offered for import into the United States, giving notice thereof to the owner or consignee, who may have a hearing before the Secretary of Health, Education, and Welfare. If it appears from an examination of such samples or otherwise that any electronic product fails to comply with applicable standards prescribed pursuant to this Act, then, unless subsection (b) of this section applies and is complied with.

(1) Such electronic product shall be refused admission
(2) The Secretary of the Treasury shall cause the destruction of such electronic product unless such article is exported, under regulations prescribed by the Secretary of the Treasury, within 90 days after the date of notice of refusal of admission or within such additional time as may be permitted by such regulations.

(b) If it appears to the Secretary of Health, Education, and Welfare that any electronic product refused admission pursuant to subsection (a) of this section can be brought into compliance with applicable standards prescribed pursuant this Act, final determination as to admission of such electronic product may be deferred upon filing of timely written application by the owner or consignee and the execution by her/him of a good and sufficient bond providing for the payment of such liquidated damages in the event of default as the Secretary of Health, Education, and Welfare may by regulation prescribe. If such application is filed and such bond is executed the Secretary of Health, Education, and Welfare may, in accordance with rules prescribed by the Secretary, permit the applicant to perform such operations with respect to such electronic product as may be specified in the notice of permission.
(c) All expenses (including travel, per diem or subsistence, and salaries of officers or employees of the United States) in connection with the destruction provided for in subsection (a) of this section and the supervision of operations provided for in subsection (b) of this section, and all expenses in connection with the storage, cartage, or labor with respect to any electronic product refused admission pursuant to subsection (a) of this section, shall be paid by the owner or consignee, and, in event of default, shall constitute a lien against any future importations made by such owner or consignee.
(d) It shall be the duty of every manufacturer offering an electronic product for importation into the United States to designate in writing an agent upon whom service of all administrative and judicial processes, notices, orders, decisions, and requirements may be made for and on behalf of said manufacturer, and to file such designation with the Secretary, which designation may from time to time be changed by like writing, similarly filed. Service of all administrative and judicial processes, notices, orders, decisions, and requirements may be made upon said manufacturer by service upon such designated agent at her/his office or usual place of residence with like effect as if made personally upon said manufacturer, and in default of such designation of such agent, service of process, notice, order, requirement, or decision in any proceeding before the Secretary or in any judicial proceeding enforcement of this subpart or any standards prescribed pursuant to this subpart may be made by posting such process, notice, order, requirement, or decision in the Office of the Secretary or in a place designated by the Secretary by regulation.

(a) If the Secretary finds for good cause that the methods, tests, or programs related to electronic product radiation safety in a particular factory, warehouse, or establishment in which electronic products are manufactured or held, may not be adequate or reliable, officers or employees duly designated by the Secretary, upon presenting appropriate credentials and a written notice to the owner, operator, or agent in charge, are thereafter authorized.

(1) To enter, at reasonable times, any area in such factory, warehouse, or establishment in which the manufacturer's tests (or testing programs) required by this Act are carried out.
(2) To inspect, at reasonable times and within reasonable limits and in a reasonable manner, the facilities and procedures within such are a which are related to electronic product radiation safety. Each such inspection shall be commenced and completed with reasonable promptness. In addition to other grounds upon which good cause may be found for purposes of this subsection, good cause will be considered to exist in any case where the manufacturer has introduced into commerce any electronic product which does not comply with an applicable standard prescribed under this subpart and with respect to which no exemption from the notification requirements has been granted by the Secretary.

(b) Every manufacturer of electronic products shall establish and maintain such records (including testing records), make such reports, and provide such information, as the Secretary may reasonably require to enable her/him to determine whether such manufacturer has acted or is acting in compliance with this subpart and standards prescribed pursuant to this subpart and shall, upon request of an officer or employee duly designated by the Secretary, permit such officer or employee to inspect appropriate books, papers, records, and documents relevant to determining whether such manufacturer has acted or is acting in compliance with standards prescribed pursuant to this subpart.
(c) Every manufacturer of electronic products shall provide to the Secretary such performance data and other technical data related to safety as may be required to carry out the purposes of this subpart. The Secretary is authorized to require the manufacturer to give such notification of such performance and technical data at the tim e of original purchase to the ultimate purchaser of the electronic product, as the Secretary determines necessary to carry out the purposes of this subpart after consulting with the affected industry.
(d) Accident and investigation reports made under this subpart by any officer, employee, or agent of the Secretary shall be available for use in any civil, criminal, or other judicial proceeding arising out of such accident. Any such officer, employee, or agent may be required to testify in such proceedings as to the facts developed in such investigations. Any such report shall be made available to the public in a manner which need not identify individuals. All reports on research projects, demonstration projects, and other related activities shall be public information.
(e) The Secretary or appointed representative shall not disclose any information reported to or otherwise obtained by the Secretary, pursuant to subsection (a) or (b) of this section, which concerns any information which contains or relates to a trade secret or other matter referred to in section 1905 of title 18 of the United States Code information may be disclosed to other officers or employees of the Department and of other agencies concerned with carrying out this subpart or when relevant in any proceeding under this subpart. Nothing in this section shall authorize the withholding of information by the Secretary, or by any officers or employees under the Secretary's control, from the duly authorized committees of the Congress.
(f) The Secretary may by regulation —

(1) Require dealers and distributors of electronic products, to which there are applicable standards prescribed under this subpart and the retail prices of which is not less than $50, to furnish manufacturers of such products such information as may be necessary to identify and locate, for purposes, the first purchasers of such products for purposes other than resale.
(2) Require manufacturers to preserve such information.

Any regulation establishing a requirement pursuant to clause (1) of the preceding sentence shall —

(A) Authorize such dealers and distributors to elect, in lieu of immediately furnishing such information to the manufacturer, to hold and preserve such information until advised by the manufacturer or Secretary that such information is needed by the manufacturer for purposes of this Act.
(B) Provide that the dealer or distributor shall, upon making such election, give prompt notice of such election (together with information identifying the notifier and the product) to the manufacturer and shall, when advised by the manufacturer or Secretary, of the need therefor for the purposes of this Act, immediately furnish the manufacturer with the required information. If a dealer or distributor discontinues the dealing in or distribution of electronic products, the Secretary shall turn the information over to the manufacturer. Any manufacturer receiving information pursuant to this subsection concerning first purchasers of products for purposes other than resale shall treat it as confidential and may use it only if necessary for the purpose of notifying persons.

=== Prohibited Acts ===
(a) It shall be unlawful —

(1) For any manufacturer to introduce, or to deliver for introduction, into commerce, or to import into the United States, any electronic product which does not comply with an applicable standard prescribed pursuant to this Act.
(2) For any person to fail to furnish any notification or other material or information required by this Act; or to fail to comply with the requirements of this Act.
(3) For any person to fail or to refuse to establish or maintain records required by this subpart or to permit access by the Secretary or any of his duly authorized representatives to, or the copying of, such records, or to permit entry or inspection, as required by or pursuant to this Act.
(4) For any person to fail or to refuse to make any report required pursuant to this Act or to furnish or preserve any information required pursuant to this Act.
(5) For any person —

(A) To fail to issue a certification as required by this Act
(B) To issue such a certification when such certification is not based upon a test or testing program meeting the requirements of this Act or when the issuer, in the exercise of due care, would have reason to know that such certification is false or misleading in a material respect.

(b) The Secretary may exempt any electronic product, or class thereof, from all or part of subsection (a), upon such conditions as the Secretary may find necessary to protect the public health or welfare, for the purpose of research, investigations, studies, demonstrations, or training, or for reasons of national security.

=== Enforcement ===
(a) The United States district court shall have jurisdiction, for cause shown, to restrain violations of this Act and to restrain dealers and distributors of electronic products from selling or otherwise disposing of electronic products which do not conform to an applicable standard prescribed pursuant to this Act except when such products are disposed of by returning them to the distributor or manufacturer from whom they were obtained. The district courts of the United States shall also have jurisdiction in accordance with section 1355 of title 28 of the United States Code to enforce the provisions of subsection (b) of this section.
(b) As used in this subpart —

(1 ) Any person who violates this Act shall be subject to a civil penalty of not more than $1,000. For purposes of this subsection, any such violation shall with respect to each electronic product involved, or with respect to each act or omission made unlawful by this Act, constitute a separate violation, except that the maximum civil penalty imposed on any person under this subsection for any related series of violations shall not exceed $300,000.
(2) Any such civil penalty may on application be remitted or mitigated by the Secretary. In determining the amount of such penalty, or whether it should be remitted or mitigated and in what amount, the appropriateness of such penalty to the size of the business of the person charged and the gravity of the violation shall be considered. The amount of such penalty, when finally determined, may be deducted from any sums owing by the United States to the person charged.

(c) Actions under subsections (a) and (b) of this section may be brought in the district court of the United States for the district wherein any act or omission or transaction constituting the violation occurred, or in such court for the district where the defendant is found or transacts business, and process in such cases may be served in any other district of which the defendant is an inhabitant or wherever the defendant may be found.
(d) Nothing in this subpart shall be construed as requiring the Secretary to report for the institution of proceedings minor violations of this subpart whenever the Secretary believes that the public interest will be adequately served by a suitable written notice or warning.
(e) Except as provided in the first sentence of this Act, compliance with this subpart or any regulations issued thereunder shall not relieve any person from liability at common law or under statutory law.
(f) The remedies provided for in this subpart shall be in addition to and not in substitution for any other remedies provided by law.

=== Annual Report ===
(a) The Secretary shall prepare and submit to the President for transmittal to the Congress on or before April 1 of each year a comprehensive report on the administration of this subpart for the preceding calendar year. Such report shall include —

(1) A thorough appraisal (including statistical analyses, estimates, and long-term projections) of the incidence of biological injury and effects, including genetic effects, to the population resulting from exposure to electronic product radiation, with a breakdown, insofar as practicable, among the various sources of such radiation.
(2) A list of Federal electronic product radiation control standards prescribed or in effect in such year, with identification of standards newly prescribed during such year.
(3) An evaluation of the degree of observance of applicable standards, including a list of enforcement actions, court decisions, and compromises of alleged violations by location and company name.
(4) A summary of outstanding problems confronting the administration of this subpart in order of priority.
(5) An analysis and evaluation of research activities completed as a result of Government and private sponsorship, and technological progress for safety achieved during such year.
(6) A list, with a brief statement of the issues, of completed or pending judicial actions under this subpart.
(7) The extent to which technical information was disseminated to the scientific, commercial, and labor community and consumer oriented information was made available to the public.
(8) The extent of cooperation between Government officials and representatives of industry and other interested parties in the implementation of this subpart including a log or summary of meetings held between Government officials and representatives of industry and other interested parties.

(b) The report required by subsection (a) shall contain such recommendations for additional legislation as the Secretary deems necessary to promote cooperation among the several States in the improvement of electronic product radiation control and to strengthen the national electronic product radiation control program.

=== Federal-State Cooperation ===
The Secretary is authorized by this Act —

(1) To accept from State and local authorities engaged in activities related to health or safety or consumer protection, on a reimbursable basis or otherwise, any assistance in the administration and enforcement of this subpart which the Secretary may request and which they may be able and willing to provide and, if so agreed, may pay in advance or otherwise for the reasonable cost of such assistance.
(2) The Secretary may, for the purpose of conducting examinations, investigations, and inspections, commission any officer or employee of any such authority as an officer of the Department.

=== Effect on State Standards ===
Whenever any standard prescribed pursuant to this Act with respect to an aspect of performance of an electronic product is in effect, no State or political subdivision of a State shall have any authority either to establish, or to continue in effect, any standard which is applicable to the same aspect of performance of such product and which is not identical to the Federal standard. Nothing in this subpart shall be construed to prevent the Federal Government or the government of any State or political subdivision thereof from establishing a requirement with respect to emission of radiation from electronic products procured for its own use if such requirement imposes a more restrictive standard than that required to comply with the otherwise applicable Federal standard.

=== Noninterference with Other Federal Agencies ===
The amendments made by section 2 (Amendments to Public Health Service Act) of this Act shall not be construed as superseding or limiting the functions, under any other provision of law, of any officer or agency of the United States.

== See also ==
- Cathode ray tube
- Classical electromagnetism
- Electromagnetic field
- Electromagnetic induction
- Electromagnetic radiation and health
- Electromagnetic spectrum
- Electromagnetism
- Magnetism and temperature
