= Nutritional Health Alliance =

USA Political Lobbyist Group

The Nutritional Health Alliance is an industry lobby group which lobbies United States lawmakers to pass industry-friendly health legislation.

The Nutritional Health Alliance was formed in 1992 by the supplement industry "to mount a forceful campaign to evade studies of their products." Gerald Kessler, president of Nature's Plus, was the first head. Flyers were sent to health food stores with titles such as "The FDA wants to put you out of Business" and "Don't Let the FDA Take Your Vitamins Away".

The Nutritional Health Alliance is best known for its involvement in the Nutritional Health Alliance vs. Shalala case. In this case, the Nutritional Health Alliance argued to the second circuit that the U.S. Food and Drug Administration (FDA) mandating health claims on dietary supplements violated manufacturer's First Amendment rights.

== See also ==
- Nutrition Labeling and Education Act
