= Safe Medical Device Amendments of 1990 =

- Long title: An Act to amend the Federal Food, Drug, and Cosmetic Act to make improvements in the regulation of medical devices, and for other purposes.
- Enacted by: the 101st United States Congress
- Effective: November 28, 1990

Citations
- Public law: 101-629
- Statutes at Large: 104 Stat. 4511

Codification
- Acts amended: Federal Food, Drug and Cosmetic Act; Medical Device Amendments of 1976
- Titles amended: 21 U.S.C.: Food and Drugs
- U.S.C. sections amended: 21 U.S.C. ch. 9, 21USC360i: Sec. 519, 21USC360i: Sec. 519a, 21USC360j: Sec. 520j, 21USC360c: Sec. 513f, 21USC360e: Sec. 515, 21USC360j: Sec. 520l, 21USC360c: Sec. 513(a)(l)(A)(ii), 21USC360c: Sec. 513(a)(l)(B), 21USC360c: 513(a)(1)(C), 21USC360c: Sec. 513e, 21USC360c: Sec. 513(f)(2)(A), 21USC360j: Sec. 520(1)(2), 21USC360c: Sec. 513(f), 21USC360d: Sec. 514, 21USC360d: Sec. 514(b), 21USC360j: Sec. 520(i), 21USC360i: Sec. 519, 21USC360h: Sec. 518, 21USC360e: Sec. 515(e), 21USC351: Sec. 501(f), 21USC360j: Sec. 520, 21USC360g: Sec. 517(a), 21USC353: Sec. 503, 21USC321: Sec. 201, 21USC333: Sec. 303, 21USC360c: Sec. 513(f)(2), 21USC360d: Sec. 514(b), 21USC360e: Sec. 515(c)(2), 21USC360f: Sec. 516(a), 21USC360j: Sec. 520(f)(l)(A), 21USC360j: Sec. 520(l)(2)

Legislative history
- Introduced in the House of Representatives as H.R. 3095 by Henry Waxman (D–CA) on August 2, 1989; Committee consideration by Committee on Energy and Commerce; Passed the House on October 10, 1990 (Agreed by Voice Vote); Passed the Senate on October 12, 1990 (Agreed by Voice Vote, in lieu of S. 3006) with amendment; House agreed to Senate amendment on October 27, 1990 (Agreed by Voice Vote) with further amendment; Senate agreed to House amendment on October 27, 1990 (Agreed by Voice Vote); Signed into law by President George H. W. Bush on November 28, 1990

Safe Medical Device Amendments of 1990 or Safe Medical Devices Act sanctioned progressive reporting and tracking rules for medical devices classified by the Medical Device Regulation Act. The Act mandates reporting requirements by medical device manufacturers regarding adverse safety events and product effectiveness of devices classified as substantially equivalent to Class III medical devices. The United States Statute established the Health and Human Services Office of International Relations and a U.S. Food and Drug Administration office for regulatory activities concerning healthcare products which are considered a combinational biological, device, or drug product. The Act of Congress transferred the electronic product radiation control provisions established by the Radiation Control for Health and Safety Act.

Congressman Henry A. Waxman and Senator Edward M. Kennedy were the chairperson sponsors of the safe medical device amendments. The H.R. 3095 legislation was passed by the 101st Congressional session and enacted by the 41st President of the United States George H. W. Bush on November 28, 1990.

== History ==
The 1990 Safe Medical Device law originated after an eight-year U.S. congressional inquiry of the Medical Device Amendments of 1976. The 1976 legislation deviated the clarification and proper evaluation of competitive or "substantial equivalence" medical devices.

The U.S. General Accounting Office presented exhibits for the legislative review which defined the vulnerabilities of the 510K premarket notification process. The 510K premarket approval program was cross-examined to discover qualified medical devices were disallowed from testing in some instances, inadequately tested in a clinical setting, and deficient in adverse data collection oversight.

The U.S. congressional review concluded medical devices would require actual device experience in a clinical setting and sufficient reporting of adverse data events. The legislation would encompass medical devices demonstrating the potential for life-threatening events and accurate adverse data collection would be required for informed regulatory decisions.
