= United States v. Dotterweich =

- Supreme Court of the United States

Argued October 12, 1943 Decided November 22, 1943
- Full case name: United States v. Dotterweich
- Citations: 320 U.S. 277 (more) 64 S. Ct. 134; 88 L. Ed. 48; 1943 U.S. LEXIS 1100

Court membership
- Chief Justice Harlan F. Stone Associate Justices Owen Roberts · Hugo Black; Stanley F. Reed · Felix Frankfurter; William O. Douglas · Frank Murphy; Robert H. Jackson · Wiley B. Rutledge

Case opinions
- Majority: Frankfurter, joined by Stone, Black, Douglas, Jackson
- Dissent: Murphy, joined by Roberts, Reed, Rutledge

Laws applied
- Federal Food, Drug, and Cosmetic Act

United States v. Dotterweich, 320 U.S. 277 (1943), was a United States Supreme Court case in which the Court upheld strict, vicarious liability for the president of a company convicted of a public welfare offense.

== Decision ==
Defendant Dotterweich was the president and general manager of a company that purchased drugs from a manufacturer, repackaged them, and shipped them with a new label. Dotterweich was convicted of a misdemeanor under the Food and Drugs Act of 1906, which prohibited the shipment of adulterated and misbranded drugs in interstate commerce. The Supreme Court upheld Dotterweich's conviction even though he did not directly participate in the proscribed shipments. The Court reasoned that this was a public welfare offense where strict, vicarious liability was appropriate because the president of a company ought to be aware of the regulations associated with their business, and that the president was in a much better position than members of the public to protect against the possible dangers of the product.

== See also ==
- List of United States Supreme Court cases
- Lists of United States Supreme Court cases by volume
- United States v. Park
