= Federal Food, Drug, and Cosmetic Act =

Acts of the United States Congress

Federal Food, Drug, and Cosmetic Act of 1938
- Long title: To prohibit the movement in interstate commerce of adulterated and misbranded food, drugs, devices, and cosmetics, and for other purposes.
- Acronyms (colloquial): FFDCA, FD&C Act
- Enacted by: the 75th United States Congress

Citations
- Public law: 75-717
- Statutes at Large: 52 Stat. 1040

Codification
- Acts repealed: Pure Food and Drug Act
- Titles amended: 21 U.S.C.: Food and Drugs
- U.S.C. sections created: 21 U.S.C. ch. 9 § 301 et seq.

Legislative history
- Introduced in the Senate as S. 5 by Royal Copeland (D–NY) on January 6, 1937; Passed the Senate on March 9, 1937 (voice); Passed the House with amendment on June 1, 1938 (voice); Reported by the joint conference committee on June 10, 1938; agreed to by the Senate on June 10, 1938 (voice) and by the House on June 13, 1938 (voice); Signed into law by President Franklin D. Roosevelt on June 25, 1938

Major amendments
- 1951 Food, Drug, and Cosmetics Act Amendments, PL 82–215, 65 Stat 648; 1962 Food, Drug, and Cosmetics Act Amendments, PL 87–781, 76 Stat 780; Fair Packaging and Labeling Act, PL 89–755, 80 Stat 1296; Medical Device Regulation Act, PL 94–295, 90 Stat 539; Radiation Control for Health and Safety Act of 1968, PL 90-602, 82 Stat 1173; Drug Price Competition and Patent Term Restoration Act of 1984, PL 98-471, 98 Stat 1585; Nutrition Labeling and Education Act (1990), PL 101-535, 104 Stat 2353; Safe Medical Device Amendments of 1990, PL 101-629, 104 Stat 4511; Food and Drug Administration Revitalization Act (1990), PL 101-635, 104 Stat 4583; Dietary Supplement Health and Education Act (1994), PL 103-417, 108 Stat 4332; Food Quality Protection Act of 1996; Food and Drug Administration Modernization Act of 1997, PL 105-115, 111 Stat 2296; Food and Drug Administration Amendments Act of 2007, PL 110-85, 121 Stat 823; Over-the-Counter Hearing Aid Act of 2017; Sunscreen Innovation Act; Drug Quality and Security Act; Microbead-Free Waters Act of 2015

United States Supreme Court cases
- 62 Cases of Jam v. United States (1951)

The Federal Food, Drug, and Cosmetic Act (abbreviated as FFDCA, FDCA, or FD&C) is a set of laws passed by the United States Congress in 1938 giving authority to the Food and Drug Administration (FDA) to oversee the safety of food, drugs, medical devices, and cosmetics. The FDA's principal representative with members of congress during its drafting was Charles W. Crawford. A principal author of this law was Royal S. Copeland, a three-term U.S. senator from New York. In 1968, the Electronic Product Radiation Control provisions were added to the FD&C. Also in that year the FDA formed the Drug Efficacy Study Implementation (DESI) to incorporate into FD&C regulations the recommendations from a National Academy of Sciences investigation of effectiveness of previously marketed drugs. The act has been amended many times, most recently to add requirements about bioterrorism preparations.

The introduction of this act was influenced by the death of more than 100 patients due to elixir sulfanilamide, a sulfanilamide medication where the toxic solvent diethylene glycol was used to dissolve the drug and make a liquid form. It replaced the earlier Pure Food and Drug Act of 1906.

== Contents ==
The FDC Act has ten chapters:

I. Short Title
II. Definitions

- 201(f) is the definition for a food, which explicitly includes chewing gum
- 201(g) is the definition for a drug
- 201(h) is the definition for a medical device
- 201(s) is the definition of a food additive
- 201(ff) is the definition of a dietary supplement

III. Prohibited Acts and Penalties

This section contains both civil law and criminal law clauses. Most violations under the act are civil, though repeated, intentional, and fraudulent violations are covered as criminal law. All violations of the FD&C Act require interstate commerce because of the commerce clause, but this is often interpreted broadly and few products other than raw produce are considered outside of the scope of the act.
Notably, the FD&C Act uses strict liability due to the Dotterweich and Park Supreme Court cases. It is one of a very small number of criminal statutes that does.

IV. Food

There is a distinction in food adulteration between those that are added and those that are naturally present. Substances that are added are held to a stricter "may render (it) injurious to health" standard, whereas substances that are naturally present need only be at a level that "does not ordinarily render it injurious to health"

V. Drugs and Devices

- 505 is the description of the drug approval process
- 510(k) is the section that allows for clearance of class II medical devices
- 515 is the description of the (class III) device approval process

VI. Cosmetics
VII. General Authority

- 704 allows inspections of regulated entities. Inspection results are reported on Form 483.

VIII. Imports and Exports
IX. Tobacco Products
X. Miscellaneous

== Food coloring ==
The FD&C Act is perhaps best known to consumers because of its use in the naming of food coloring additives, such as "FD&C Yellow No. 6". The Act made the certification of some food color additives mandatory. The FDA lists nine FD&C (Food, Drugs & Cosmetics) certified color additives for use in foods in the United States, and numerous D&C (Drugs & Cosmetics) colorings allowed only in drugs for external application or cosmetics. Color additives derived from natural sources, such as vegetables, minerals or animals, and artificial counterparts of natural derivatives, are exempt from certification. Both artificial and naturally derived color additives are subject to rigorous standards of safety before their approval for use in foods.

=== Certifiable colors ===
Name	Common name	Color	Comment
FD&C Blue No. 1	Brilliant blue FCF	blue	
FD&C Blue No. 2	Indigo carmine	indigo	
FD&C Green No. 3	Fast Green FCF	green	
FD&C Red No. 3	Erythrosine	pink	Banned in the United States on January 15, 2025.
FD&C Red No. 40	Allura Red AC	red	
FD&C Yellow No. 5	Tartrazine	yellow	
FD&C Yellow No. 6	Sunset Yellow FCF	orange	
	Orange B	orange	Restricted to specific uses
	Citrus Red No. 2	red	Restricted to specific uses

== Food additives ==
The FFDCA requires producers of food additives to demonstrate to a reasonable certainty that no harm will result from the intended use of an additive. If the FDA finds an additive to be safe the agency issues a regulation specifying the conditions under which the additive may be safely used.

=== Definition of food additive ===
A shortened definition of "food additive" is defined by the FDA as "any substance the intended use of which results or may reasonably be expected to result, directly or indirectly, in its becoming a component or otherwise affecting the characteristic of any food (including any substance intended for use in producing, manufacturing, packing, processing, preparing, treating, packaging, transporting, or holding food; and including any source of radiation intended for any such use); if such substance is not GRAS or sanctioned prior to 1958 or otherwise excluded from the definition of food additives." The full definition can be found in Section 201(s) of the FD&C Act, which provides for any additional exclusions.

== Homeopathic medications ==
Homeopathic preparations are regulated and protected under Sections 201(g) and 201(j), provided that such medications are formulated from substances listed in the Homeopathic Pharmacopoeia of the United States, which the Act recognizes as an official drug compendium.

However, under separate authority of FTC Act, the Federal Trade Commission declared in November 2016 that homeopathic products cannot include claims of effectiveness without "competent and reliable scientific evidence". If no such evidence exists, they must state this fact clearly on their labeling.

== Bottled water ==
Bottled water is regulated by the FDA as a food. The Agency has published identity standards for types of water (mineral water, spring water), and regulations covering water processing and bottling, water quality and product labeling.

== Cosmetics ==
This Act defines cosmetics as "articles intended to be rubbed, poured, sprinkled, or sprayed on, introduced into, or otherwise applied to the human body ... for cleansing, beautifying, promoting attractiveness, or altering the appearance." Under the Act, the FDA does not approve cosmetic products, but the Act prohibits the marketing of adulterated or misbranded cosmetics. However, the FDA does not have the authority to order recalls of cosmetics. If a company is selling a product that is adulterated or misbranded, the FDA can ask the company to recall their product or sue them. The FDA can and does inspect cosmetics manufacturing facilities to ensure that cosmetics are not adulterated.

== Medical devices ==
On May 28, 1976, the FD&C Act was amended to include regulation for medical devices. The amendment required that all medical devices be classified into one of three classes:

- Class I: Devices that do not require premarket approval or clearance but must follow general controls. Dental floss is a class I device.
- Class II: Devices that are cleared using the 510(k) process. Diagnostic tests, cardiac catheters, hearing aids, and dental amalgams are examples of class II devices.
- Class III: Devices that are approved by the premarket approval (PMA) process, analogous to a New Drug Application. These tend to be devices that are permanently implanted into a human body or may be necessary to sustain life. An artificial heart meets both criteria. The most commonly recognized class III device is an automated external defibrillator. Devices that do not meet either criterion are generally cleared as class II devices.

For devices that were marketed prior to the amendment (preamendment devices) and were classified as Class III, the amendment obligated the FDA to review the device to either reclassify it as a Class II device subject to premarket notification, or to require the device manufacturer to undergo the premarket authorization process and prove the safety and efficacy of the device in order to continue marketing it. Notable examples of such preamendment devices are those used for electroconvulsive therapy, which the FDA started reviewing in 2011.

=== Premarket notification (510(k), PMN) ===
Section 510(k) of the Federal Food, Drug, and Cosmetic Act requires those device manufacturers who must register to notify FDA, at least 90 days in advance, of their intent to market a medical device.

This is known as premarket notification, PMN, or 510(k). It allows FDA to determine whether the device is equivalent to a device already placed into one of the three classification categories. Thus, "new" devices (not in commercial distribution prior to May 28, 1976) that have not been classified can be properly identified.

Any device that reaches market via a 510(k) notification must be "substantially equivalent" to a device on the market prior to May 28, 1976 (a "predicate device"). If a device being submitted is significantly different, relative to a pre-1976 device, in terms of design, material, chemical composition, energy source, manufacturing process, or intended use, the device nominally must go through a premarket approval, or PMA.

A device that reaches market via the 510(k) process is not considered to be "approved" by the FDA. Nevertheless, it can be marketed and sold in the United States. They are generally referred to as "cleared" or "510(k) cleared" devices.

A 2011 study by Diana Zuckerman and Paul Brown of the National Research Center for Women and Families, and Steven Nissen of the Cleveland Clinic, published in the Archives of Internal Medicine, showed that most medical devices recalled in the last five years for "serious health problems or death" had been previously cleared by the FDA using the less stringent, and cheaper, 510(k) process. In a few cases the devices had been deemed so low-risk that they did not need FDA regulation. Of the 113 devices recalled, 35 were for cardiovascular issues.

=== Premarket approval (PMA) ===
Premarket approval (PMA) is the most stringent type of device marketing application required by FDA. Unlike the 510(k) pathway, the maker of the medical device must submit an application to the FDA and must receive approval prior to marketing the device.

The PMA application contains information about how the medical device was designed and how it is manufactured, as well as preclinical and clinical studies of the device, demonstrating that it is safe and effective for its intended use. Because the PMA requires a clinical trial it is significantly more expensive than a 510(k).

=== Automatic Class III designation (de novo classification) ===
The Food and Drug Administration Modernization Act of 1997 created section 513(f)(2) of the FD&C Act, which obligated the FDA to establish a risk-based regulatory system for medical devices. As a result, the FDA established a de novo pathway for devices that would automatically be classified as Class III because there was no already-existing device that could be used a predicate for a 510(k) submission, but for which general controls or general and special controls could provide a reasonable assurance of safety and effectiveness.

== Related legislation ==
The Wheeler-Lea Act, passed in 1938, granted the Federal Trade Commission the authority to oversee advertising of all products regulated by FDA, other than prescription drugs.

== Significant amendments and related laws ==
Descriptions of these can be found at the FDA's web site.

Amendments:

- Durham-Humphrey Amendment, Public Law (PL) 82–215 (October 26, 1951) created prescription-only status for some drugs
- Drug Efficacy Amendment ("Kefauver Harris Amendment") PL 87–781 (October 10, 1962)
- Vitamin-Mineral Amendment ("Proxmire Amendment") (April 22, 1976) prohibited the FDA from establishing standards to limit the potency of vitamins and minerals in food supplements or regulating them as drugs based solely on their potency.
- Drug Abuse Control Amendments of 1965
- Medical Device Amendments of 1976 PL 94–295 (May 28, 1976)
- Infant Formula Act of 1980, PL 96–359 (October 26, 1980)
- Orphan Drug Act, PL 97–414 (January 4, 1983)
- Drug Price Competition and Patent Term Restoration Act of 1984, PL 98–417 (aka Hatch-Waxman) (September 24, 1984)
- Prescription Drug Marketing Act of 1987, PL 100–293 (August 18, 1988)
- Generic Animal Drug and Patent Term Restoration Act of 1988, PL 100–670 (November 16, 1988)
- Nutrition Labeling and Education Act of 1990, PL 101–535 (November 8, 1990)
- Safe Medical Device Amendments of 1990, PL 101–629 (November 28, 1990)
- Medical Device Amendments of 1992, PL 102–300 (June 16, 1992)
- Prescription Drug User Fee Act (PDUFA) of 1992, PL 102–571 (October 29, 1992)
- Animal Medicinal Drug Use Clarification Act (AMDUCA) of 1994, PL 103–396 (October 22, 1994)
- Dietary Supplement Health And Education Act of 1994, PL 103–417 (October 25, 1994)
- Food Quality Protection Act of 1996, PL 104–170 (August 3, 1996)
- Animal Drug Availability Act of 1996, PL 104–250 (October 9, 1996)
- Best Pharmaceuticals for Children Act, PL 107–109 (January 4, 2002)
- Medical Device User Fee and Modernization Act (MDUFMA) of 2002, PL 107–250 (October 26, 2002)
- Animal Drug User Fee Act of 2003, PL 108–130 (February 20, 2003)
- Pediatric Research Equity Act of 2003, PL 108–155 (December 3, 2003)
- Minor Use and Minor Species Animal Health Act of 2004 PL 108–282 (August 2, 2004)
- Food Allergen Labeling and Consumer Protection Act of 2004, PL 108–282 (August 2, 2004)
- FDA Food Safety Modernization Act (January 4, 2011)
- Generic Drug User Fee Amendment of 2012
- 21st Century Cures Act, PL 114–255 (December 13, 2016)
- FDA Reauthorization Act of 2017, PL 115–52 (August 18, 2017)

Other laws:

- Biologics Control Act of 1902 (repealed; for historical reference)
- Federal Food and Drugs Act of 1906 (repealed; for historical reference)
- Federal Meat Inspection Act (March 4, 1907)
- Federal Trade Commission Act (September 26, 1914)
- Filled Milk Act (March 4, 1923)
- Import Milk Act (February 15, 1927)
- Public Health Service Act (July 1, 1944)
- Trademark Act of 1946 (July 5, 1946)
- Reorganization Plan 1 of 1953 (March 12, 1953)
- Poultry Products Inspection Act (August 28, 1957)
- Fair Packaging and Labeling Act (November 3, 1966)
- The National Environmental Policy Act of 1969 (January 1, 1970)
- Controlled Substances Act (October 27, 1970)
- Controlled Substances Import and Export Act (October 27, 1970)
- Egg Products Inspection Act (December 29, 1970)
- Lead-Based Paint Poisoning Prevention Act (January 13, 1971)
- Federal Advisory Committee Act (October 6, 1972)
- Government in the Sunshine Act (September 13, 1976)
- Government Patent Policy Act of 1980 (December 12, 1980)
- Federal Anti-Tampering Act (October 13, 1983)
- Sanitary Food Transportation Act (November 3, 1990)
- Food and Drug Administration Revitalization Act (November 28, 1990)
- Mammography Quality Standards Act (MQSA) (October 27, 1992)
- Food and Drug Administration Modernization Act (November 21, 1997)
- Bioterrorism Act of 2002 (June 12, 2002)
- Project BioShield Act of 2004 (July 21, 2004)
- Food and Drug Administration Amendments Act of 2007 (September 27, 2007)
- Pandemic and All-Hazards Preparedness Reauthorization Act of 2013 (H.R. 307; 113th Congress) Pub. L. 113–5 (text) (PDF) (March 13, 2013)

== Comparison to state laws ==
Some US states have adopted the FD&C Act as an equivalent state law and will by default adopt any changes to the Federal law as changes to the state law as well.

- California Safe Cosmetics Act of 2005

== See also ==
- Drugs in the United States
- Food Administration
- Food Quality Protection Act
- Kefauver Harris Amendment
- List of food additives
- Office of Criminal Investigations
- Pure Food and Drug Act
- Regulation of therapeutic goods
- 100,000,000 Guinea Pigs (c. 1933 book which influenced passage of this Act)
