= Detailee =

Type of USA federal government employee

A detailee is an employee of a United States executive branch government agency temporarily assigned to another position, generally in another U.S. government agency or an international organization. The employee's original agency will usually continue to pay the person's salary. Examples include advisors to the National Security Council. Detailees are usually not political appointees and are not usually screened to check their political loyalty, although the second Trump administration may be changing this practice.

== See also ==
- Definition of detailee at Wiktionary
