= Medical Device User Fee and Modernization Act =

The Medical Device User Fee and Modernization Act (MDUFA) authorizes the Center for Devices and Radiological Health (CDRH) to collect user fees from medical device manufacturers. It is reauthorized every 5 years.

In the years preceding enactment of MDUFMA, the FDA's medical device program suffered a long-term, significant loss of resources that undermined the program's capacity and performance.

== History ==
Medical Device User Fee and Modernization Act legislative history
Year	Act	Legislative package	Synopsis
2002	MDUFA		Authorized FDA to collect fees for premarket review
2007	MDUFA II	FDA Amendments Act of 2007	Added two types of annual fees: establishment registration fee and product fee
2012	MDUFA III	Safety and Innovation Act of 2012	Expanded the definition of establishments subject to a registration fee, thus increasing the applicable device establishments paying the fee.
2017	MDUFA IV	FDA Reauthorization Act of 2017	Advanced the use of real-world evidence and patient engagement
2022	MDUFA V	Continuing Appropriations and Ukraine Supplemental Appropriations Act	

== User fees ==
User Fees for FY 2024
Application type	Standard fee	Small-business fee
510(k)	$21,760	$5,440
513(g)	$6,528	$3,264
PMA, PDP, PMR, BLA	$483,560	$120,890
De novo classification request	$145,068	$36,267
Panel-track supplement	$386,848	$96,712
180-day supplement	$72,534	$18,134
Real-time supplement	$33,849	$8,462
BLA efficacy supplement	$483,560	$120,890
30-day notice	$7,737	$3,869
Annual fee for periodic reporting on a class III device (PMAs, PDPs, and PMRs)	$16,925	$4,231
