= Mended Hearts =

- Founded: 1951
- Website: Official Website

Mended Hearts is a United States-based charity which functions as a support group for individuals suffering from heart disease. It was founded in 1951 by cardiac surgeon Dwight Harken. Harken was the first surgeon in history to repeatedly perform successful heart surgery. Harken invited post-surgery and prospective heart patients to meet for mutual encouragement and support. These patients spoke of their "mended hearts". Mended Hearts offers a program for the families of children born with congenital heart defects known as Mended Little Hearts.

Mended Hearts partners with 460 hospitals and rehabilitation clinics across the United States, with 285 chapters employing 21,000 volunteers.
