= Henry Waxman =

American politician (born 1939)

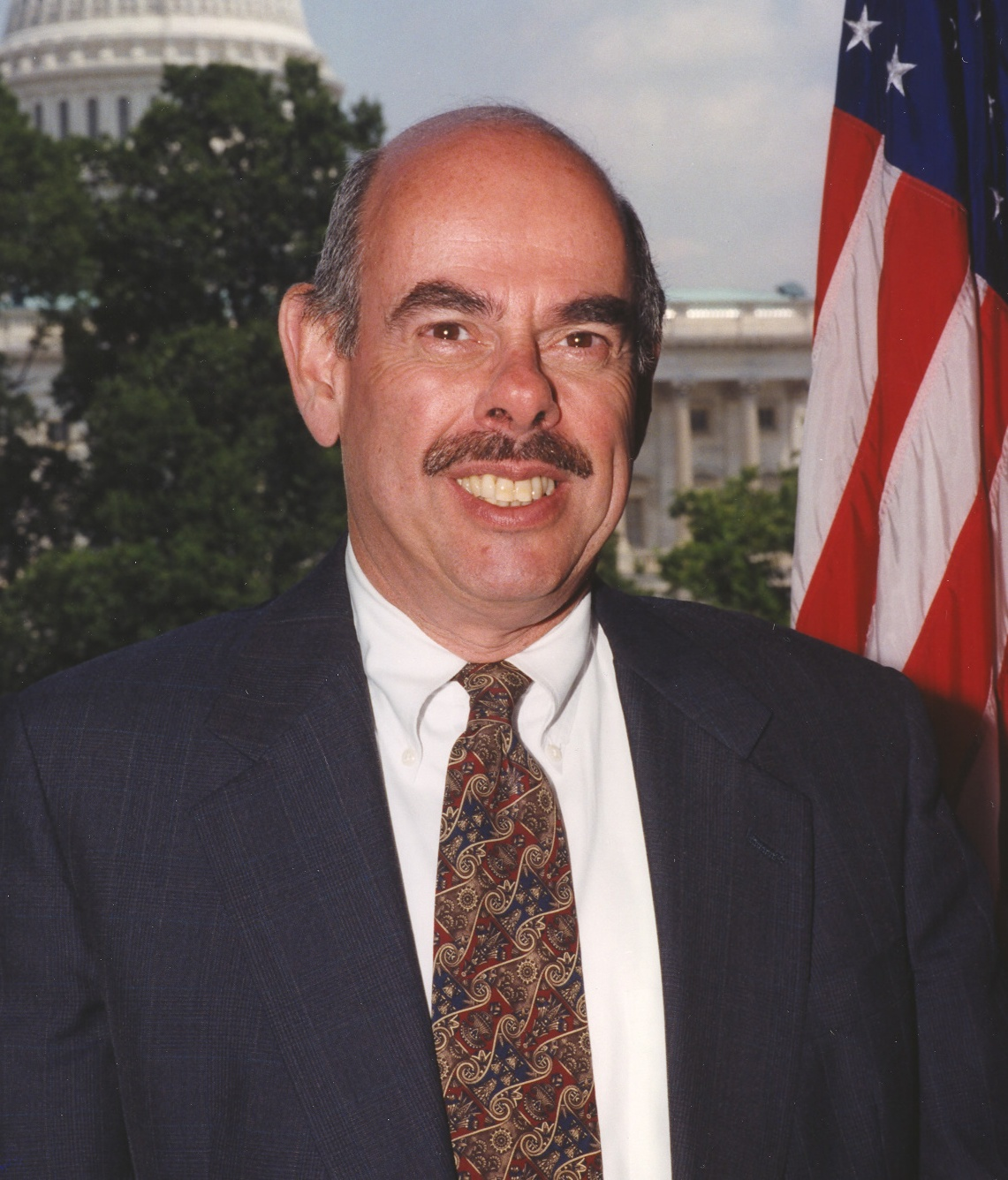

Member of the U.S. House of Representatives from California
- In office January 3, 1975 – January 3, 2015
- Preceded by: John Rousselot
- Succeeded by: Ted Lieu
- Constituency: 24th district (1975–1993); 29th district (1993–2003); 30th district (2003–2013); 33rd district (2013–2015)
Committee positions
Chair of the House Energy Committee
In office January 3, 2009 – January 3, 2011
Preceded by	John Dingell
Succeeded by	Fred Upton
Chair of the House Oversight Committee
In office January 3, 2007 – January 3, 2009
Preceded by	Tom Davis
Succeeded by	Edolphus Towns

Member of the California State Assembly from the 61st district
- In office January 6, 1969 – November 30, 1974
- Preceded by: Lester McMillan
- Succeeded by: Bud Collier

Personal details
- Born: Henry Arnold Waxman; September 12, 1939 (age 87) Los Angeles, California, U.S.
- Party: Democratic
- Spouse: Janet Kessler
- Children: 2
- Education: University of California, Los Angeles (BA, JD)
- Waxman's voice Waxman supporting the Family Smoking Prevention and Tobacco Control Act. Recorded April 1, 2009

Henry Arnold Waxman (born September 12, 1939) is an American politician and lobbyist who was a U.S. representative from California from 1975 to 2015. He is a member of the Democratic Party.

His district included much of the western part of the city of Los Angeles, as well as West Hollywood, Santa Monica, and Beverly Hills, and was numbered the 24th district from 1975 to 1993, the 29th district from 1993 to 2003, and the 30th district from 2003 to 2013, changing because of redistricting after the 1990, 2000, and 2010 censuses.

Waxman was an influential liberal member of Congress, and was instrumental in passing laws including the Infant Formula Act of 1980, the Orphan Drug Act of 1983, the Drug Price Competition and Patent Term Restoration Act of 1984, the Clean Air Act of 1990, the Ryan White CARE Act of 1990, the Food Quality Protection Act of 1996, the State Children's Health Insurance Program of 1997, the Postal Accountability and Enhancement Act of 2006, the Family Smoking Prevention and Tobacco Control Act of 2009, and the Patient Protection and Affordable Care Act of 2010. In 1985, he played an instrumental role in banning federal funding for the Red Line subway in Los Angeles so that it would not go into his affluent Westside district.

He is currently chairman at Waxman Strategies, a D.C.-based lobbying firm, Regent Lecturer for the University of California, Los Angeles, and lecturer at the Johns Hopkins Bloomberg School of Public Health.

== Early life, education, and early career ==
Waxman was born to a Jewish household in Los Angeles, California, the son of Esther (née Silverman) and Ralph Louis Waxman. His father was born in Montreal, Canada; his mother was from Pennsylvania. All of his grandparents were Jewish immigrants from Russia. He attended college at UCLA, earning a bachelor's degree in political science in 1961 and a J.D. degree from UCLA School of Law in 1964. After graduating, he worked as a lawyer. He was elected to the California State Assembly in 1968, and served three terms. Along with U.S. Representative Howard Berman, whom he studied with at UCLA, Waxman co-founded the Los Angeles County Young Democrats.

== U.S. House of Representatives ==
=== Elections ===
In 1974, Democratic U.S. Representative Chet Holifield retired after 16 terms in Congress. Waxman gave up his state assembly seat to run for the district, which had been re-numbered from the 19th to the 24th in a mid-decade redistricting. Waxman won the Democratic nomination for the district, and easily won the general election, as this was tantamount to election in this heavily Democratic district. He was re-elected 17 times, with no substantive opposition. He faced no major-party opposition in 1986, and was completely unopposed in 2008. His district changed numbers four times in his tenure — from the 24th (1975–1993) to the 29th (1993–2003) to the 30th (2003–2013) to the 33rd (2013–2015). At the time of his retirement, he was one of the last two members, along with George Miller of California, of the large Democratic freshman class of 1975.

From 2003 to 2013, Waxman's district included Santa Monica, Beverly Hills, Agoura Hills, Calabasas, Hidden Hills, Malibu, West Hollywood, and Westlake Village, as well as such areas of western Los Angeles as West Los Angeles, Fairfax, Pacific Palisades, Brentwood, Beverlywood, Topanga, Chatsworth, Palms, Westwood, West Hills, Westside Village, Woodland Hills, but through the creation of a new 33rd Congressional District by the California Citizens Redistricting Commission, in the November 2012 general election, Waxman won re-election in an area including his home community of Beverly Hills and stretching to Malibu and Pacific-coastal communities heading south, including Santa Monica, Manhattan Beach, Redondo Beach, Hermosa Beach, the Palos Verdes Peninsula, and Northwest San Pedro.

=== Tenure ===
Before the Democrats lost control of the House of Representatives in 1995, Waxman was a powerful figure in the House as chair of the Energy and Commerce Subcommittee on Health and the Environment from 1979. In this role, he conducted investigations into a range of health and environmental issues, including universal health insurance, Medicare and Medicaid coverage, AIDS, and air and water pollution. In 1994, Waxman forced the chief executives of the seven major tobacco companies to swear under oath that nicotine was not addictive.

Waxman's stated legislative priorities are health and environmental issues. These include universal health insurance, Medicare and Medicaid coverage, tobacco, AIDS, air and water quality standards, pesticides, nursing home quality standards, women's health research and reproductive rights, the availability and cost of prescription drugs, and the right of communities to know about pollution levels. As an example of Waxman's thoughts regarding tobacco, on April 13, 2010, he requested that Major League Baseball ban smokeless tobacco in all its various forms - snuff, dipping tobacco, chewing tobacco, snus, etc.

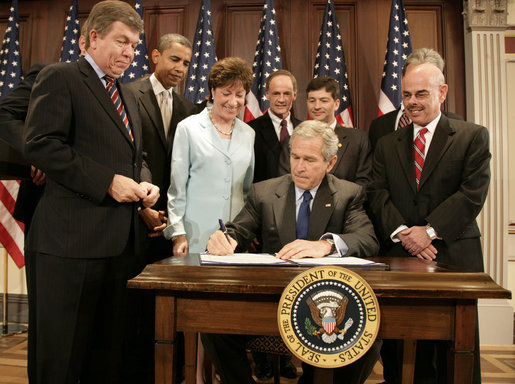
Waxman at a bill signing ceremony with President George W. Bush in September 2006

With the Democrats' victory in the 2006 midterm elections, Waxman became chairman of the House Oversight and Government Reform Committee, the principal investigative committee of the House. He was the committee's ranking Democrat from 1997 to 2007. In 1998, while he was still ranking member, he created a "Special Investigations Division" to investigate matters that he felt the full committee had neglected. This was possible because the committee has broad powers to investigate any matter with federal policy implications, even if another committee has jurisdiction over it. He has also harshly criticized the Republicans for ignoring their "constitutional responsibility" to conduct oversight over the government.

On March 16, 2004, at Waxman's request, the Committee on Government Reform Minority Office published "Iraq on the Record, the Bush Administration's Public Statements on Iraq", a detailed and searchable collection of 237 specific misleading statements made by Bush Administration officials about the threat posed by Iraq. It contains statements that were misleading based on what was known to the Administration at the time the statements were made. It does not include statements that appear mistaken only in hindsight. If a statement was an accurate reflection of U.S. intelligence at the time it was made, it was excluded even if it now appears erroneous.

In 2006, Project On Government Oversight, a government watchdog group, presented Waxman with its Good Government Award for his various contributions to government transparency and oversight.

On the day after the 2006 elections, Waxman directed his aides to draw up an "oversight plan" for the panel. He had already let it be known that he wanted to investigate Halliburton, as well as its alleged malfeasance related to government contracts in Iraq. It is very likely that he could also investigate the numerous scandals surrounding Jack Abramoff. This led to concerns among Democratic aides that the Government Reform Committee under Waxman would stage a repeat of the committee's performance under the Clinton administration, when it issued over 1,000 subpoenas. However, Waxman told Newsweek that he is interested in accountability and not retaliation.

In 2009, he began serving as the Chairman of the House Energy and Commerce Committee, after defeating Chairman John Dingell in a 137–122 secret vote of House Democrats on November 20, 2008.

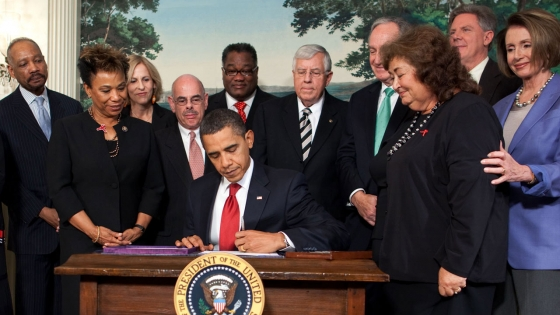
Waxman stands behind President Obama at an October 30, 2009, bill signing ceremony

Senator Alan Simpson of Wyoming once described Waxman as being 'tougher than a boiled owl.'

Waxman is proud of his "strong Jewish identity" and has drawn political conclusions from his exploration of the religion. "Judaism is about acting and doing the right thing, not simply believing in it or mindlessly following ritual," he said in a speech presented by the University of Southern California's Casden Institute for the Study of the Jewish Role in American Life. Waxman said he applies Jewish ethical values to his congressional service. He further said that the "Jewish values" of "human rights, social justice, and equal opportunities ... are synonymous with American values," and that such values "are in my opinion closer to a Democratic position." Waxman supported fellow representative Jane Harman during her primary challenge from Marcy Winograd when Winograd said she would support a one-state solution to the Israeli-Palestinian conflict, instead of the two-state resolution endorsed by Waxman and Harman. Saying it suffers from "a culture of corruption" and "has become obsessed with secrecy," he accused the American government of having abandoned these values. "(The) Republican leadership ignores presidential rules and norms and has no consideration for custom," he said.

==== Abortion ====
Waxman was strongly critical of the Stupak-Pitts Amendment, which places limits on taxpayer-funded abortions in the context of the November 2009 Affordable Health Care for America Act. Instead of this version, it was reported that many Democrats supported a version that would find "common ground."

==== 1985 subway opposition ====
In 1985, Waxman sponsored a bill supported by affluent homeowners groups in his district to ban federal funding for the Red Line subway after a methane gas explosion in the Fairfax District. Prior to that, Waxman had privately expressed concerns about "gentrification" of his affluent district.

Waxman maintains that the 1985 bill was sponsored in the interest of public safety and not, as some allege, to hinder access of the working classes in South and East Los Angeles to his affluent district. In a letter to the Los Angeles Times, Waxman cites the 2005 study: "The panel concurred as well that in 1985, the decision to hold further tunneling in abeyance was prudent, given the circumstances and extent of information and technology at that time. Much has changed since then to significantly improve tunneling and operation safety."

In 2005, a robust real estate market, multi-dwelling construction boom, and lack of public mass transit planning on the westside caused by Waxman's bill resulted in gridlock throughout Waxman's district. At the request of Los Angeles Mayor and LA Metro Board President Antonio Villaraigosa, Waxman agreed to lift the ban if a panel of five engineers found tunneling under the Miracle Mile stretch of Wilshire Boulevard to be safe. In October 2005, the panel decided that tunneling was possible, and on December 16, Waxman responded by announcing he would introduce a bill to the U.S. House that would lift the ban on federal money for subway tunneling in the district. This bill passed the House via unanimous vote on September 20, 2006.

==== Solyndra ====
Waxman, as the ranking member of the House Energy and Commerce Committee, oversaw the case of Solyndra, a solar company that filed for bankruptcy after receiving a $535 million loan guarantee from the DOE. Waxman recounted meeting with Solyndra's CEO two months before they filed for bankruptcy, who assured him that "Solyndra’s future was bright with sales and production booming." Waxman was accused of being involved with the Solyndra loan by Darrell Issa. Waxman responded, saying he had no involvement in the selection of the loan.

=== Committee assignments ===
- Committee on Energy and Commerce (Ranking Member)
  - As ranking member of the full committee, Rep. Waxman may serve as an ex officio member of all subcommittees.

==== Caucus memberships ====
- Congressional Progressive Caucus
- Congressional Space Caucus
- Congressional Travel & Tourism Caucus
- International Conservation Caucus

== Electoral history ==
California's 24th congressional district: Results 1974–1990
Year	Democratic	Votes	Pct	Republican	Votes	Pct	3rd Party	Party	Votes	Pct	3rd Party	Party	Votes	Pct	3rd Party	Party	Votes	Pct
1974	Henry Waxman	85,343	63%	Elliott Graham	45,680	34%	David Davis	American Independent	3,980	3%								
1976	Henry Waxman	108,296	68%	David Simmons	51,478	32%												
1978	Henry Waxman	85,075	63%	Howard Schaefer	44,243	33%	Kevin Peters	Peace and Freedom	6,453	5%								
1980	Henry Waxman	93,569	64%	Roland Cayard	39,744	27%	Maggie Feigin	Peace and Freedom	5,905	4%	Robert Lehman	Libertarian	5,172	3%	Jack Smilowitz	American Independent	2,341	2%
1982	Henry Waxman	88,516	65%	Jerry Zerg	42,133	31%	Jeff Mandel	Libertarian	5,420	4%								
1984	Henry Waxman	97,340	63%	Jerry Zerg	51,010	33%	James Green	Peace and Freedom	2,780	2%	Tim Custer	Libertarian	2,477	2%				
1986	Henry Waxman	103,914	87%	no candidate			George Abrahams	Libertarian	8,871	8%	James Green	Peace and Freedom	5,388	5%				
1988	Henry Waxman	112,038	72%	John Cowles	36,835	24%	James Green	Peace and Freedom	3,571	2%	George Abrahams	Libertarian	2,627	2%				
1990	Henry Waxman	71,562	69%	John Cowles	26,607	26%	Maggie Phair	Peace and Freedom	5,706	5%								

California's 29th congressional district: Results 1992–2000
Year	Democratic	Votes	%	Republican	Votes	%	Third Party	Party	Votes	%	Third Party	Party	Votes	%				
1992	Henry Waxman	160,312	61%	Mark Robbins	67,141	26%	David Davis	Independent	15,445	6%	Susan Davies	Peace and Freedom	13,888	5%	Felix Rogin	Libertarian	4,699	2%
1994	Henry Waxman	160,312	72%	Paul Stepanek	53,801	24%	Michael Binkley	Libertarian	7,162	3%								
1996	Henry Waxman	145,278	68%	Paul Stepanek	52,857	25%	John Daly	Peace and Freedom	8,819	4%	Mike Binkley	Libertarian	4,766	2%	Brian Rees	Natural Law	3,097	1%
1998	Henry Waxman	131,561	74%	Mike Gottlieb	40,282	23%	Mike Binkley	Libertarian	3,534	2%	Karen Blasdell-Wilkinson	Natural Law	2,717	2%				
2000	Henry Waxman	180,295	76%	Jim Scileppi	45,784	19%	Jack Anderson	Libertarian	7,944	3%	Bruce Currivan	Natural Law	4,178	2%				

California's 30th congressional district: Results 2002–2010
Year	Democratic	Votes	%	Republican	Votes	%	Third Party	Party	Votes	%	Third Party	Party	Votes	%
2002	Henry Waxman	130,604	70%	Tony Goss	54,989	30%								
2004	Henry Waxman	216,682	71%	Victor Elizalde	87,465	29%								
2006	Henry Waxman	151,284	71%	David Jones	55,904	26%	Adele Cannon	Peace and Freedom	4,546	2%				
2008	Henry Waxman	242,792	100%	No candidate										
2010	Henry Waxman	153,663	67%	Charles Wilkerson	75,948	32%	Erich Miller	Libertarian	5,021	2%	Richard Castaldo	Peace and Freedom	3,115	1%

California's 33rd congressional district: Results 2012–
Year	Democratic	Votes	%	Republican	Votes	%	Third Party	Party	Votes	%
2012	Henry Waxman	171,860	54%	No candidate			Bill Bloomfield	Independent	146,660	46%

== Post-congressional career ==
Once hailed in the media as a "lobbyist's worst nightmare," Waxman became a successful and influential lobbyist when he opened his own firm after retiring from Congress.

== In popular culture ==
In 1993, a news clip of Waxman was used for the movie And the Band Played On, and in 2021, Waxman was praised by television host Bill Maher on his HBO Talk Show Series Real Time with Bill Maher. In discussing the concept of political "work horses", as compared to "show horses", Maher described Waxman's legislative achievements and emphasized that Waxman's tenacity and low public profile as a "work horse" allowed him to effect substantial change in the United States, specifically through updates to programs and policies including food safety, clean air, HIV research, and the social safety net. In Waxman's honor, Maher introduced a segment titled "The Baldy Awards", to recognize the achievements of Waxman and other "work horse" politicians.

== See also ==
- Hatch-Waxman Act
- Politicization of science for a brief discussion of Waxman's work on the subject
- Deficit Reduction Act of 2005 for Waxman's take on whether that bill became law or not
- American Clean Energy and Security Act, also known as the Waxman-Markey bill, legislation for the introduction of emissions trading into the United States.
- List of Jewish members of the United States Congress

U.S. House of Representatives
Preceded by John Rousselot	Member of the U.S. House of Representatives from California's 24th congressional district 1975–1993	Succeeded by Anthony Beilenson
Preceded by Maxine Waters	Member of the U.S. House of Representatives from California's 29th congressional district 1993–2003	Succeeded by Adam Schiff
Preceded by Cardiss Collins	Ranking Member of the House Oversight Committee; 1997–2007	Succeeded by Tom Davis
Preceded by Xavier Becerra	Member of the U.S. House of Representatives from California's 30th congressional district 2003–2013	Succeeded by Brad Sherman
Preceded by Tom Davis	Chair of the House Oversight Committee; 2007–2009	Succeeded by Edolphus Towns
Preceded by John Dingell	Chair of the House Energy Committee; 2009–2011	Succeeded by Fred Upton
Preceded by Joe Barton	Ranking Member of the House Energy Committee; 2011–2015	Succeeded by Frank Pallone
Preceded by Karen Bass	Member of the U.S. House of Representatives from California's 33rd congressional district 2013–2015	Succeeded by Ted Lieu
U.S. order of precedence (ceremonial)
Preceded by George Miller as Former U.S. Representative	Order of precedence of the United States as Former U.S. Representative	Succeeded by Nick Rahall as Former U.S. Representative
