= Medical Device Regulation Act =

Law in the United States

Medical Device Amendments of 1976
- Long title: An Act to amend the Federal Food, Drug, and Cosmetic Act to provide for the safety and effectiveness of medical devices intended for human use, and for other purposes.
- Enacted by: the 94th United States Congress
- Effective: May 28, 1976

Citations
- Public law: 94-295
- Statutes at Large: 90 Stat. 539

Codification
- Acts amended: Federal Food, Drug and Cosmetic Act
- Titles amended: 21 U.S.C.: Food and Drugs
- U.S.C. sections created: 21 U.S.C. ch. 9, subch. V §§ 360c:Sec. 513, 360d:Sec. 514, 360e:Sec. 515, 360f:Sec. 516, 360g:Sec. 517, 360h:Sec. 518, 360i:Sec. 519, 360j:Sec. 520, 360k:Sec. 521
- U.S.C. sections amended: 21 U.S.C. ch. 9, subch. II § 321; 21 U.S.C. ch. 9, subch. III §§ 331, 334; 21 U.S.C. ch. 9, subch. V §§ 351, 352, 358, 360; 21 U.S.C. ch. 9, subch. VII §§ 374, 379e; 21 U.S.C. ch. 9, subch. VIII § 381

Legislative history
- Introduced in the Senate as S. 510 by Edward M. Kennedy (D–MA) on January 30, 1975; Committee consideration by Senate Committee on Commerce Senate Committee on Labor and Public Welfare House Committee on Interstate and Foreign Commerce; Passed the House on March 9, 1976 (362-32); Passed the Senate on April 17, 1975 (88-5, in lieu of H.R. 11124) with amendment; House agreed to Senate amendment on May 13, 1976 (cleared) with further amendment; Senate agreed to House amendment on May 13, 1976 (cleared); Signed into law by President Gerald R. Ford on May 28, 1976

Major amendments
- Safe Medical Device Amendments of 1990

The Medical Device Regulation Act or Medical Device Amendments of 1976 was introduced by the 94th Congress of the United States. Congressman Paul G. Rogers and Senator Edward M. Kennedy were the chairperson sponsors of the medical device amendments. The Title 21 amendments were signed into law on May 28, 1976, by the 38th President of the United States Gerald R. Ford.

The U.S. legislation enacted in 1976 amended the Food, Drug, and Cosmetic Act of 1938 signed by the 32nd President of the United States Franklin D. Roosevelt.

== History ==
During the 1960s, the Secretary of Health, Education, and Welfare (HEW) commissioned the Cooper Committee to study the adverse effects of medical devices for human use. In 1970, the study committee recommended a classification for medical devices based on comparative risk. In 1976, the Dalkon Shield intrauterine device injured at least 900,000 women in the United States, which aided the emphasis for regulatory oversight and therapeutic requirements provided by the U.S. legislation P.L. 94-295.

== Provisions of the Act ==
Classification of Medical Devices
There are three classifications for medical devices:

- Class I - General Controls for devices considered as low risks for human use.

Medical device has sufficient information to provide reasonable assurance of the safety and effectiveness of the device. Medical device is not to be for a use in supporting or sustaining human life, for a use which is of substantial importance in preventing impairment of human health, and does not present a potential unreasonable risk of illness or injury.

- Class II - Performance Standards for devices considered as moderate risks for human use.

Medical device has insufficient information to provide reasonable assurance of the safety and effectiveness of the device. Medical device cannot be classified as a class I device because the controls authorized are insufficient to provide reasonable assurance of the safety and effectiveness of the device. Medical device has sufficient information to establish a performance standard and it is necessary to establish a performance standard for the device.

- Class III - Premarket Approval for devices considered as high risks for human use.

Medical device cannot be classified as a class I device because insufficient information exists to determine that the controls authorized are sufficient to provide reasonable assurance of the safety and effectiveness of the device. Medical device cannot be classified as a class II device because insufficient information exists for the establishment of a performance standard to provide reasonable assurance of its safety and effectiveness of the device. Medical device is to be for use in supporting or sustaining human life, of substantial importance in preventing impairment of human health, or presents a potential unreasonable risk of illness or injury, is to be subject, premarket approval to provide reasonable assurance of its safety and effectiveness.

Classification Panels for Medical Devices

- Classification panels are to determine which devices intended for human use should be subject to the requirements of class I - general controls, class II - performance standards, or class III - premarket approval.
- Classification panels are to provide notice to the manufacturers and importers of medical devices intended for human use.
- Manufacturers and importers are to prepare for the application of such requirements and to report medical devices intended for human use manufactured or imported by them.
- Panel appointments shall consist of members with adequately diversified expertise in such fields as biological and physical sciences, clinical and administrative medicine, engineering, and other related professions. Persons who are qualified by training and experience to evaluate the safety and effectiveness of medical devices or possess skills in the use of, experience in the development, manufacture, or utilization of such medical devices.
- No individual who is in the regular full-time employment of the United States and engaged in the administration of this Act may be a member of any medical device classification panel.
