= Ending Medical Reversal =

2015 book by Vinay Prasad and Adam Cifu

- First edition
- Author: Vinay Prasad; Adam Cifu
- Language: English
- Genre: Non-fiction
- Publisher: Johns Hopkins University Press
- Publication date: 2015

Ending Medical Reversal: Improving Outcomes, Saving Lives is a nonfiction book written by Vinay Prasad and Adam Cifu, published in 2015 by Johns Hopkins University Press.

== Content ==
Medical reversal occurs when "a current clinical practice is found to be ineffective or inferior to a previous standard of care."

== Reviews ==
According to reviews in The New York Times, the book is "subtly subversive". Writing for The NY Times, Abigail Zuger writes, "More surprising, though, is an odd paradox: Often it is the treatments that make the most theoretical sense that fail." Sarah Wallan, a writer for MedPage Today, interviewed the co-authors about the book's origins as well as the potential improvements and comprehensive solutions they would like to see implemented in the landscape of healthcare and regulatory policy. In Wallan's review of the book, she wrote that Prasad and Cifu "carefully note that their intent in compiling this evidence was not to scold or criticize the members of their profession, but to remind clinicians to be humble in their approach to medicine, and to insist on proof before practice."
