= White House Coronavirus Task Force =

US government effort to mitigate COVID-19

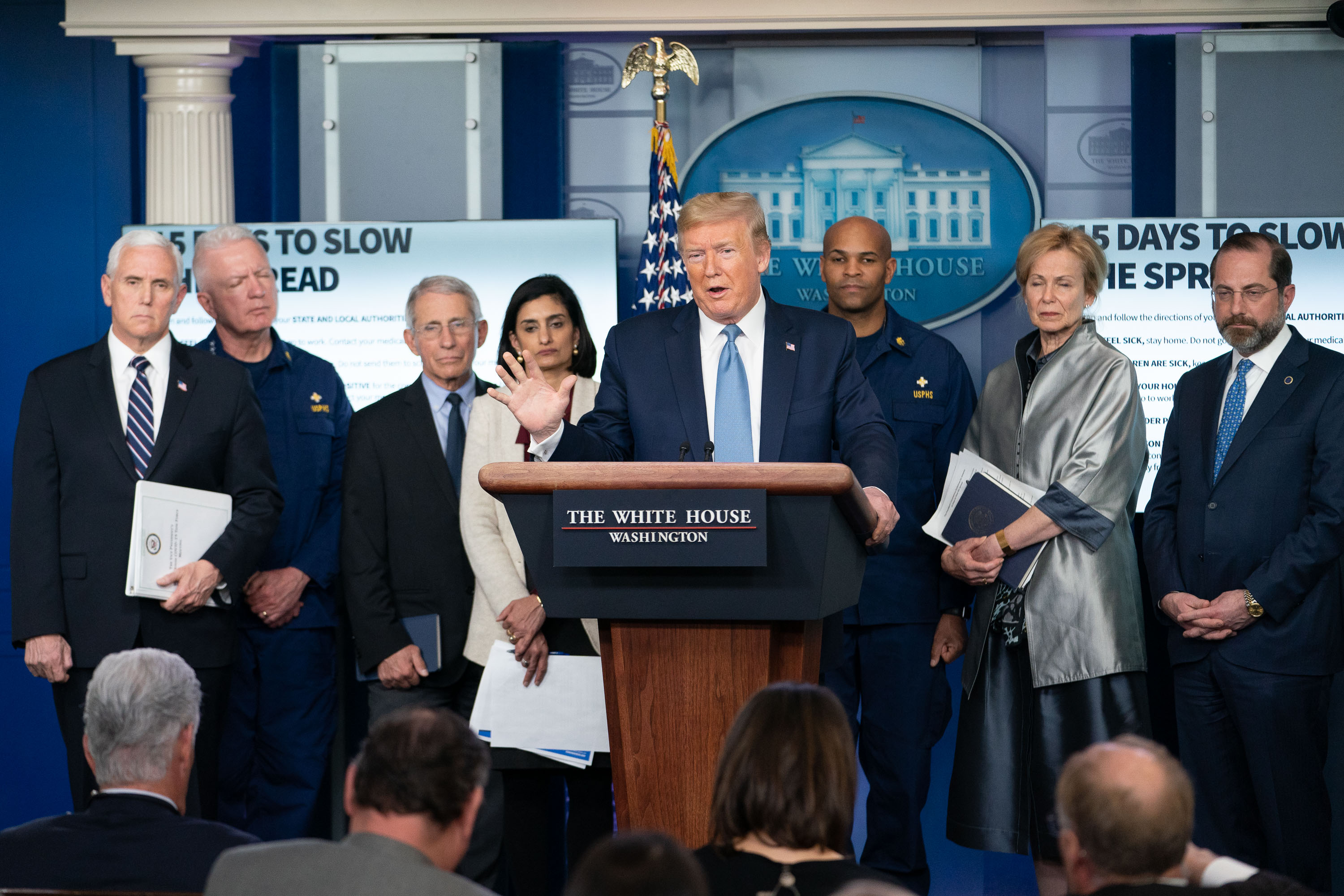
U.S. president Donald Trump and members of the White House Coronavirus Task Force brief the media on March 16, 2020.

The White House Coronavirus Task Force was the United States Department of State task force during the first Trump administration. The goal of the Task Force was to coordinate and oversee the administration's efforts to monitor, prevent, contain, and mitigate the spread of coronavirus disease 2019 (COVID-19). Also referred to as the President's Coronavirus Task Force, it was established on January 29, 2020, with Secretary of Health and Human Services Alex Azar as chair. On February 26, 2020, U.S. vice president Mike Pence was named to chair the task force, and Deborah Birx was named the response coordinator.

The task force was succeeded by the White House COVID-19 Response Team under the Biden administration.

== Background ==
The first known case in the United States of COVID-19 was confirmed in the state of Washington on January 20, 2020, in a 35-year-old man who had returned from Wuhan, China, on January 15. The White House Coronavirus Task Force was established on January 29, with Secretary of Health and Human Services Alex Azar as its chair. On January 30, the WHO declared a Public Health Emergency of International Concern and on January 31, the Trump administration declared a public health emergency, and placed travel restrictions on entry by non-citizens who had recently been in China. On February 26, U.S. vice president Mike Pence replaced Azar as chair.

== Members ==
Member		Role	Appointment
Portrait of Mike Pence	Mike Pence	Vice President of the United States; Chair of White House Coronavirus Task Force	February 26, 2020
Portrait of Debora L. Birx	Deborah Birx	United States Global AIDS Coordinator; White House Coronavirus Response Coordinator	February 26, 2020
Portrait of Jerome Adams	Vice Admiral Jerome Adams	Surgeon General of the United States	February 26, 2020
Portrait of Alex Azar	Alex Azar	United States Secretary of Health and Human Services	January 29, 2020
Portrait of Stephen E. Biegun	Stephen Biegun	United States Deputy Secretary of State	January 29, 2020
art=Portrait of Robert Blair	Robert Blair	Senior Advisor to the White House Chief of Staff	January 29, 2020
Portrait of Ben Carson	Ben Carson	United States Secretary of Housing and Urban Development	March 1, 2020
Portrait of Francis Collins	Francis Collins	Director of the National Institutes of Health	May 15, 2020
Portrait of Ken Cuccinelli	Ken Cuccinelli	Acting United States Deputy Secretary of Homeland Security	January 29, 2020
Portrait of Kelvin Droegemeier	Kelvin Droegemeier	Director of the Office of Science and Technology Policy	March 1, 2020
Portrait of Thomsas J. Engels	Thomas J. Engels	Administrator of the Health Resources and Services Administration	May 15, 2020
Portrait of Anthony Fauci	Anthony Fauci	Director of the National Institute of Allergy and Infectious Diseases	January 29, 2020
Portrait of Brett Giroir	Admiral Brett Giroir	Assistant Secretary for Health	March 13, 2020
Portrait of Joe Grogan	Joe Grogan	Director of the Domestic Policy Council	January 29, 2020
Portrait of Stephen Hahn	Stephen Hahn	Commissioner of Food and Drugs	March 1, 2020
Portrait of Derek Kan	Derek Kan	Executive Associate Director of the Office of Management and Budget	January 29, 2020
Picture of Larry Kudlow	Larry Kudlow	Director of the National Economic Council	February 26, 2020
Portrait of Chris Liddell 2017	Chris Liddell	White House Deputy Chief of Staff for Policy Coordination	January 29, 2020
Picture of Peter Marks	Peter Marks	Director of the Center for Biologics Evaluation and Research	May 15, 2020
Portrait of Steven Mnuchin	Steven Mnuchin	United States Secretary of the Treasury	February 26, 2020
Portrait of Robert C. O'Brien	Robert C. O'Brien	National Security Advisor	January 29, 2020
Portrait of Sunny Perdue	Sonny Perdue	United States Secretary of Agriculture	May 15, 2020
Portrait of Matthew Pottinger	Matthew Pottinger	Deputy National Security Advisor	January 29, 2020; Resigned January 2021
Portrait of Robert R. Redfield	Robert R. Redfield	Director of the Centers for Disease Control and Prevention	January 29, 2020
Portrait of Eugene Scalia	Eugene Scalia	United States Secretary of Labor	May 15, 2020
Portrait of Joel Szabat	Joel Szabat	Acting Under Secretary of Transportation for Policy	January 29, 2020
Portrait of Seema Verma	Seema Verma	Administrator of the Centers for Medicare and Medicaid Services	March 2, 2020
Portrait of Robert Wilkie	Robert Wilkie	United States Secretary of Veterans Affairs	March 2, 2020

== Actions ==
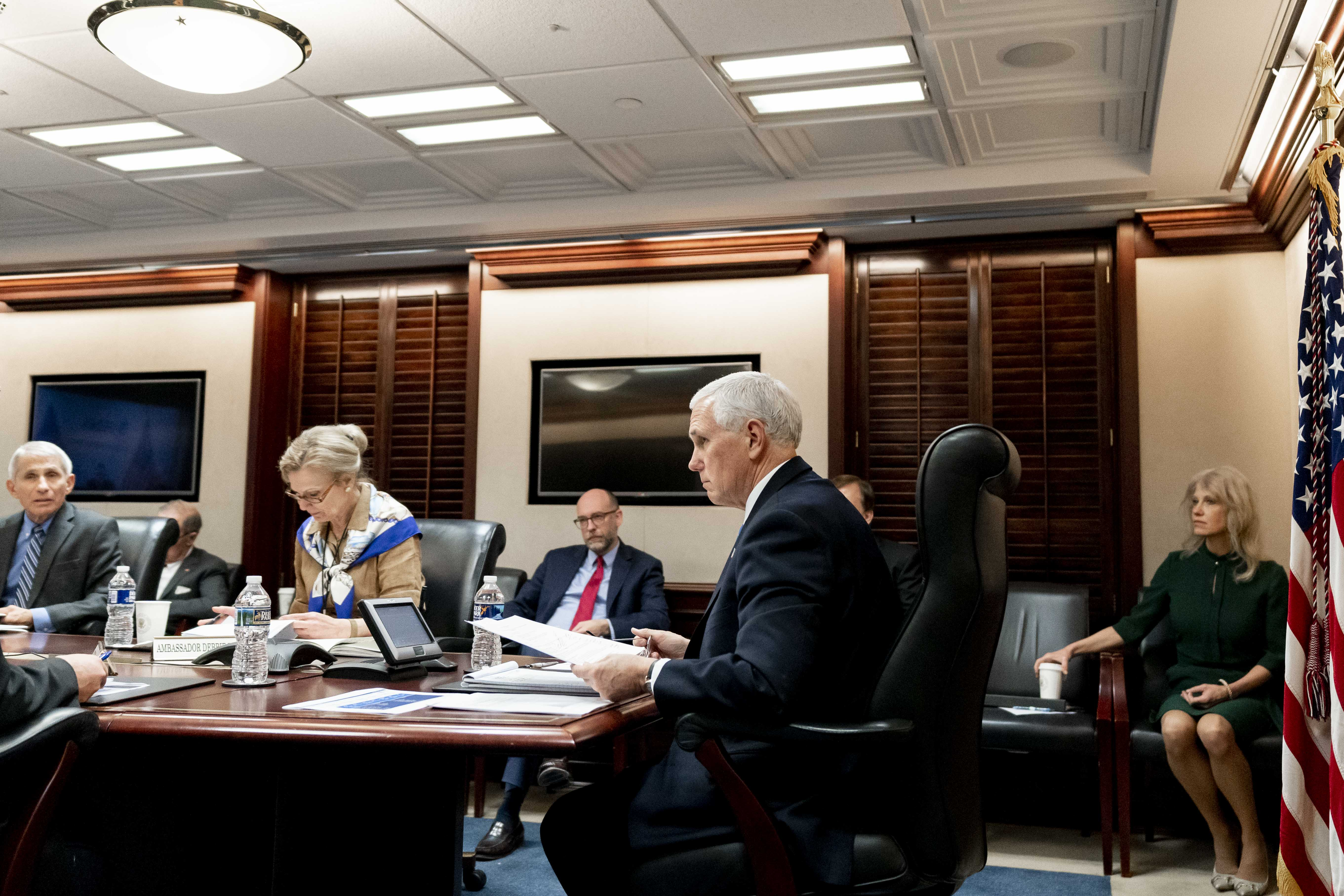
Vice president Mike Pence during the April 2020 meeting of the White House Coronavirus Task Force

The task force reviewed all coronavirus-related actions by federal agencies, and overruled the Centers for Disease Control and Prevention (CDC) several times. The New York Times reported that the CDC's leadership has been criticized during the pandemic, for mismanaging the testing kit rollout and changing its guidance on transmission of the virus; the White House says it is following the science in overruling the CDC. In March 2020, the task force deployed a team to cope with test kit shortages across the country, overseen by Brett Giroir, recognizing that the shortages were a serious threat to the country.

Pete Gaynor, the administrator of the Federal Emergency Management Agency (FEMA) was involved and stated that the task force had directed FEMA to shift in March "from playing a supporting role in assisting the U.S Department of Health and Human Services, which was designated as the initial lead federal agency for the COVID-19 pandemic response, to coordinating the Whole-of Government response to the COVID-19 pandemic".

Peter Navarro was named in March the Defense Production Act policy coordinator for the federal government. The Defense Production Act gives the President broad powers to control manufacturing during emergencies. Navarro criticized the CDC for the testing problems, and has also criticized Fauci; critics like Chuck Schumer say Navarro is unqualified for the job.

Operation Warp Speed was initiated in early April to facilitate and accelerate the development, manufacturing, and distribution of COVID-19 vaccines, therapeutics, and diagnostics after a round-table meeting with Trump, Pence and industry executives at the White House on March 2.

On September 29, the task force overruled the CDC's recommendation regarding when passenger cruise ships should be allowed to resume sailing. The CDC wanted to extend the existing "no-sail" directive until February 2021, but the task force agreed with the cruise ship industry's recommendation that the prohibition end on October 31, 2020. Two unnamed federal health officials told The New York Times that on October 9 the task force rejected a proposed CDC order requiring passengers and employees to wear masks on all forms of public and commercial transportation in the United States, including airplanes, trains, buses, subways, and transit hubs. A federal mask mandate was supported by some airlines and the transportation worker unions; the task force said that such orders should be left up to states and local governments.

== Press briefings ==
On March 10, 2020, The Hill reported that U.S. Senate Republicans who had attended a briefing with President Donald Trump had encouraged him to hold more briefings and to make Anthony Fauci the "face of the federal government's response" because according to an unnamed senator, "he has credibility", he "speaks with authority" and he "has respect in the medical community". The role of Health and Human Services secretary Alex Azar was downsized, according to The Wall Street Journal, with Pence taking a larger role.

The Task Force livestreamed press briefings at whitehouse.gov to communicate updates, guidelines, and policy changes to the public during the COVID-19 pandemic in the United States. On March 16, the White House began holding the task force press briefings daily, often two hours long, but by late April the White House discussed reducing the frequency of these briefings. On April 25, there was no press briefing, and at that time no further press briefings had been scheduled. On May 5, Pence said that the administration was discussing "what the proper time is for the task force to complete its work"; the next day, Trump said that the task force would "continue on indefinitely" but would refocus on returning the nation to normal activity.

As the US entered a new phase of re-opening businesses and getting back to work, Pence named five new members to the task force on May 15, 2020. The task force gave a press briefing on May 15, and on May 22, Birx appeared with press secretary Kayleigh McEnany. For the rest of May and into June, the task force met once or twice weekly, behind closed doors, as the White House switched to an economic message. The task force gave another press briefing on July 8. Fauci said on July 10 that he had not given a briefing to Trump for two months, and had not seen him in person since June 2.

== See also ==
- Scott Atlas, advisor to the task force
- John Fleming, assistant to the President for Planning and Implementation, and liaison to White House Chief of Staff
- Olivia Troye, former top aide to the White House Coronavirus Task Force
- Great American Economic Revival Industry Groups
- COVID-19 Advisory Board
- White House COVID-19 Response Team
