= Center for Biologics Evaluation and Research =

FDA research center

The Center for Biologics Evaluation and Research (CBER) is one of six main centers for the U.S. Food and Drug Administration (FDA), which is a part of the U.S. Department of Health and Human Services. The current director of CBER is Karim Mikhail. CBER is responsible for assuring the safety, purity, potency, and effectiveness of biologics and related products (such as vaccines, live biotherapeutics (probiotics), blood products, and cell, tissue, and gene therapies). Not all biologics are regulated by CBER. Monoclonal antibodies and other therapeutic proteins are regulated by the FDA Center for Drug Evaluation and Research (CDER).

== Scope ==
- Blood for transfusion and as a raw material for drug products, as well as reagents used for blood typing and other related activities -and- plasma derivatives, including immunoglobulins, hyperimmune products, and antitoxins.
  - Blood and blood products activities are managed through the Office of Blood Research and Review (OBRR)
- Human cells, tissues, and cellular and tissue-based products (HCT/Ps), except vascularized organs for transplantation and the associated blood vessels.
- Vaccines for use in humans.
- Diagnostic and therapeutic allergenic extracts.
- Live biotherapeutics (probiotics).
- Some medical devices, specifically test kits for HIV, tests used to screen blood donations, blood bank collection machines and equipment, and blood bank computer software.
- Xenotransplantation
- Historically, CBER was responsible for some therapeutic proteins, such as monoclonal antibodies. Control of these has been transferred to CDER. Some other drugs, such as certain anticoagulants and plasma volume expanders remain under the control of CBER.

== Authority ==
As of July 2006 CBER's authority resides in sections 351 and 361 of the Public Health Service Act and in various sections of the Food, Drug and Cosmetic Act.

Section 351 of the Public Health Service Act requires licensure of biological products that travel in interstate commerce in the United States. CBER may deny licensure or suspend or cancel a current license if a manufacturer does not comply with requirements. Unlicensed blood products used within the boundaries of a state are not unusual, and these products are subject to general regulations from other FDA legal authorities.

Section 361 of the same act allows the surgeon general to make and enforce regulations to control the interstate spread of communicable disease. This broad authority has been delegated to the FDA through a Memorandum of Understanding. Many of the products overseen by CBER are also considered drugs, and are subject to the same rules and regulations as any other drug product from the Food, Drug, and Cosmetic Act.

From these legal authorities, CBER publishes regulations which are included in the first chapter Title 21 of the Code of Federal Regulations. Most of the regulations specific to CBER are found from 21CFR600-680. 21CFR1271 contains the rules for HCT/Ps. For products which are also drugs, such as blood for transfusion, rules in 21CFR200 and following apply. Other general rules, such as the regulations for clinical trials involving human subjects in 21CFR50, may also apply.

In addition to these laws and guidelines, CBER also publishes guidance documents. These are not requirements, but are generally followed by industry. Licensed manufacturers are expected to adopt either the guidance or an equivalent process. In some cases, the guidance documents have the force of regulation because they are written to clarify existing rules.

== Vaccine Adverse Event Reporting System ==
As of 2003, the Vaccine Adverse Event Reporting System was based on a data integration platform from Informatica. The FDA uses this software to analyze data on adverse reactions to vaccines and other biologics in order to improve regulation.

== Flu vaccines ==
CBER's Vaccines and Related Biological Products Advisory Committee meets annually for a discussion and vote concerning the next year's influenza vaccine virus selection.

== Review and approval times ==
According to numbers from the FDA, in 2001 the CBER reviewed 16 Biologics License Applications (BLAs) with a median review time of 13.8 months and a median approval time of 20.3 months.

== History ==
CBER's history began with a horse named Jim, a vaccine-contamination scandal that prompted the Biologics Control Act of 1902. Originally, CBER was part of what became the National Institutes of Health, rather than the FDA. Its mission included a mandate to foster the development of new vaccines.

The Bureau was transferred from the NIH to the FDA in 1972, where it was renamed Bureau of Biologics and focused on vaccines, serums for allergy shots, and blood products.

Ten years later, with the beginning of the biotechnology revolution, the line between a drug and a biologic, or a device and a biologic, became blurred. It was merged with the FDA's Bureau of Drugs to form the Center for Drugs and Biologics during an agency-wide reorganization under Commissioner Arthur Hayes. This reorganization similarly merged the bureaus responsible for medical devices and radiation control into the Center for Devices and Radiological Health.

In 1987, under Commissioner Frank Young, CBER and the Center for Drug Evaluation and Research (CDER) were split into their present form. The two groups were charged with enforcing different laws and had significant philosophical and cultural differences. CBER took a more collaborative, public-health driven approach to working with the industry, and in the 1980s was quicker to approve products than their drugs counterparts. The growing crisis around HIV testing and treatment, and an inter-agency dispute between officials from the former Bureau of Drugs and officials from the former Bureau of Biologics over whether to approve Genentech's Activase (tissue plasminogen activator), led to the split. CBER was declared the primary agency for HIV/AIDS-related products, since HIV had been spread significantly by blood transfusion and related products.

In 1997, Congress re-authorized user fees, and research previously done at taxpayer expense began to be charged to manufacturers. CBER's research work has diminished dramatically since then.

In 2002, the FDA transferred a number of biologically produced therapeutics to CDER. CBER regulates a number of biologics-related products, including blood tests, computer software, and devices related to blood transfusion, which industry representatives would like to see handled by the much brisker Center for Devices and Radiological Health.

=== Directors ===
- Karen Midthun (c. 2010 – January 2016)
- Peter Marks (January 2016 – April 2025)
- Vinay Prasad (May 2025 – present)

== Advisory committees ==
Federal law and DHS policy define the procedures for the CBER to establish advisory committees, which may further be divided into panels and must be renewed every two years. As of 2018 the FDA has 31 advisory committees.

During the COVID-19 pandemic in 2020, the Vaccines and Related Biological Products Advisory Committee (VRBPAC) received media attention as it reviewed COVID-19 vaccines before their approval.

=== Current committees ===
- Allergenic Products Advisory Committee (APAC)
- Anesthetic and Analgesic Drug Products Advisory Committee
- Antimicrobial Drugs Advisory Committee (AMDAC) – formerly called the Anti-Infective Drugs Advisory Committee
- Arthritis Advisory Committee
- Blood Products Advisory Committee (BPAC)
- Bone, Reproductive and Urologic Drugs Advisory Committee – formerly called the Reproductive Health Drugs Advisory Committee
- Cardiovascular and Renal Drugs Advisory Committee
- Cellular, Tissue, and Gene Therapies Advisory Committee
- Dermatologic and Ophthalmic Drugs Advisory Committee (DODAC)
- Device Good Manufacturing Practice Advisory Committee (DGMPAC)
- Drug Safety and Risk Management Advisory Committee
- Endocrinologic and Metabolic Drugs Advisory Committee
- Gastrointestinal Drugs Advisory Committee
- Medical Devices Advisory Committee (MDAC) – 18 panels
- Medical Imaging Drugs Advisory Committee
- National Mammography Quality Assurance Advisory Committee (NMQAAC)
- Nonprescription Drugs Advisory Committee
- Oncologic Drugs Advisory Committee
- Patient Engagement Advisory Committee
- Pediatric Advisory Committee
- Peripheral and Central Nervous System Drugs Advisory Committee
- Pharmaceutical Science and Clinical Pharmacology Advisory Committee
- Pharmacy Compounding Advisory Committee
- Psychopharmacologic Drugs Advisory Committee
- Pulmonary-Allergy Drugs Advisory Committee
- Risk Communication Advisory Committee
- Science Advisory Board (SAB) to the National Center for Toxicological Research
- Science Board to the Food and Drug Administration
- Technical Electronic Product Radiation Safety Standards Committee (TEPRSSC)
- Tobacco Products Scientific Advisory Committee (TPSAC)
- Vaccines and Related Biological Products Advisory Committee (VRBPAC)

=== Former committees ===
- Antiviral Drugs Advisory Committee – terminated February 15, 2015
- Food Advisory Committee – terminated December 12, 2017
- Transmissible Spongiform Encephalopathies Advisory Committee – terminated June 9, 2016
- Veterinary Medicine Advisory Committee – terminated September 24, 2013

== See also ==
- Risk Evaluation and Mitigation Strategies
