= Center for Drug Evaluation and Research =

US Food and Drug Administration division

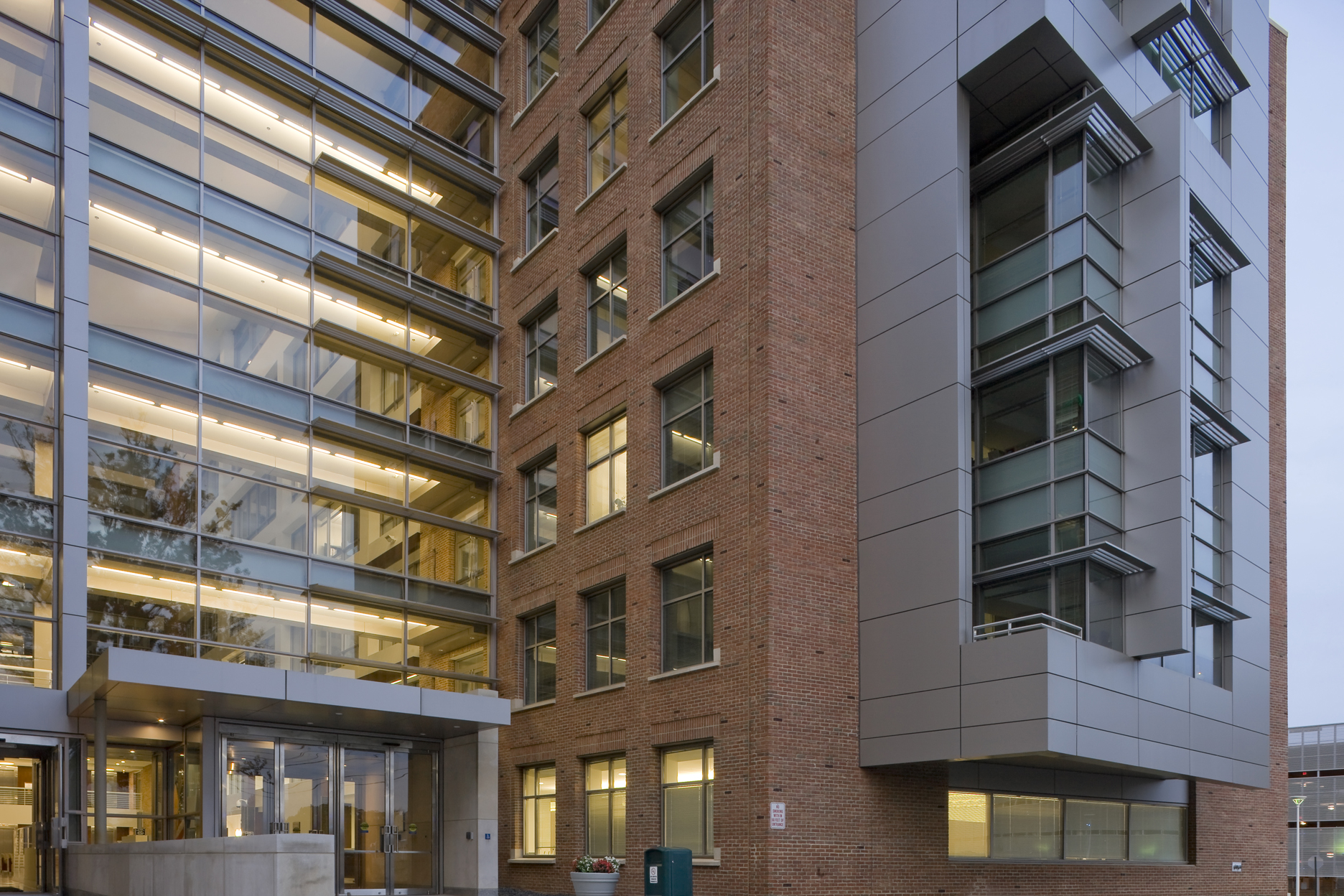
FDA Building 51 is one of the main buildings in its White Oak campus that houses the Center for Drug Evaluation and Research.

The Center for Drug Evaluation and Research (CDER, pronounced "see'-der") is a division of the U.S. Food and Drug Administration (FDA) that monitors most drugs as defined in the Food, Drug, and Cosmetic Act. Some biological products are also legally considered drugs, but they are covered by the Center for Biologics Evaluation and Research. The center reviews applications for brand name, generic, and over the counter pharmaceuticals, manages US current Good Manufacturing Practice (cGMP) regulations for pharmaceutical manufacturing, determines which medications require a medical prescription, monitors advertising of approved medications, and collects and analyzes safety data about pharmaceuticals that are already on the market.

CDER receives considerable public scrutiny, and thus implements processes that tend toward objectivity and tend to isolate decisions from being attributed to specific individuals. The decisions on approval will often make or break a small company's stock price (e.g., Martha Stewart and Imclone), so the markets closely watch CDER's decisions.

The center has around 1,300 employees in "review teams" that evaluate and approve new drugs. Additionally, the CDER employs a "safety team" with 72 employees to determine whether new drugs are unsafe or present risks not disclosed in the product's labeling.

The FDA's budget for approving, labeling, and monitoring drugs is roughly $290 million per year. The safety team monitors the effects of more than 3,000 prescription drugs on 200 million people with a budget of about $15 million a year.

== Responsibilities ==
CDER reviews New Drug Applications to ensure that the drugs are safe and effective. Its primary objective is to ensure that all prescription and over-the-counter (OTC) medications are safe and effective when used as directed.

The FDA requires a four-phased series of clinical trials for testing drugs. Phase I involves testing new drugs on healthy volunteers in small groups to determine the maximum safe dosage. Phase II trials involve patients with the condition the drug is intended to treat to test for safety and minimal efficacy in a somewhat larger group of people. Phase III trials involve one to five thousand patients to determine whether the drug is effective in treating the condition it is intended to be used for. After this stage, a new drug application is submitted. If the drug is approved, stage IV trials are conducted after marketing to ensure there are no adverse effects or long-term effects of the drug that were not previously discovered.

With the rapid advancement of biologically-derived treatments, the FDA has stated that it is working to modernize the process of approval for new drugs. In 2017, Commissioner Scott Gottlieb estimated that they have more than 600 active applications for gene and cell-based therapies.

== Divisions ==
CDER is divided into 8 sections with different responsibilities:

- Office of New Drugs

This office is responsible for oversight of clinical trials and other studies during drug development, and for the evaluation of new drug applications
The Office of New Drugs is divided into several departments based on the indication of the drug (the medical need for which it is being proposed)

- Office of Generic Drugs

This office reviews generic drug applications to ensure generic drugs are equivalent to their branded forms

- Office of Strategic Programs

This office is responsible for business programs, represents CDER in the FDA Bioinformatics Board, and communicates with other agencies

- Office of Pharmaceutical Quality

This office is responsible for integrating assessment, inspection, surveillance, policy, and research activities to strengthen pharmaceutical quality on a global scale.

- Office of Surveillance and Epidemiology

This office is responsible for post-marketing surveillance to identify adverse effects that may not have been apparent during clinical trials, using the MedWatch program

- Office of Translational Sciences

This office promotes collaboration across offices in CDER by maintaining databases and biostatistical tools for evaluating drugs

- Office of Medical and Regulatory Policy

This office develops and reviews guidelines pertinent to CDER's mission of ensuring the safety of drugs

- Office of Compliance

This office ensures compliance with regulations relating to drug development and marketing

== History ==
The FDA has had the responsibility of reviewing drugs since the passage of the 1906 Pure Food and Drugs Act. The 1938 Federal Food, Drug and Cosmetic Act required all new drugs to be tested before marketing by submitting the original form of the new drug application. Within the first year, the FDA's Drug Division, the predecessor to CDER, received over 1200 applications. The Drug Amendments of 1962 required manufacturers to prove to the FDA that the drug in question was both safe and effective. In 1966, the division was reorganized to create the Office of New Drugs, which was responsible for reviewing new drug applications and clinical testing of drugs.

In 1982, when the beginning of the biotechnology revolution blurred the line between a drug and a biologic, the Bureau of Drugs was merged with the FDA's Bureau of Biologics to form the National Center for Drugs and Biologics during an agency-wide reorganization under Commissioner Arthur Hayes. This reorganization similarly merged the bureaus responsible for medical devices and radiation control into the Center for Devices and Radiological Health.

In 1987, under Commissioner Frank Young, CDER and the Center for Biologics Evaluation and Research (CBER) were split into their present form. The two groups were charged with enforcing different laws and had significantly different philosophical and cultural differences. At that time, CDER was more cautious about approving therapeutics and had a more adversarial relationship with the industry. The growing crisis around HIV testing and treatment and an inter-agency dispute between officials from the former Bureau of Drugs and officials from the former Bureau of Biologics over whether to approve Genentech's Activase (tissue plasminogen activator) led to the split.

In its original form, CDER was composed of six offices: Management, Compliance, Drug Standards, Drug Evaluation I, Drug Evaluation II, Epidemiology and Biostatistics, and Research Resources. The Division of Antiviral Products was added in 1989 under Drug Evaluation II due to the large amount of drugs proposed for treating AIDS. The Office of Generic Drugs was also formed.

In 2002, the FDA transferred a number of biologically produced therapeutics to CDER. These include therapeutic monoclonal antibodies, proteins intended for therapeutic use, immunomodulators, and growth factors and other products designed to alter production of blood cells.
