= Carole Johnson (health official) =

American health official

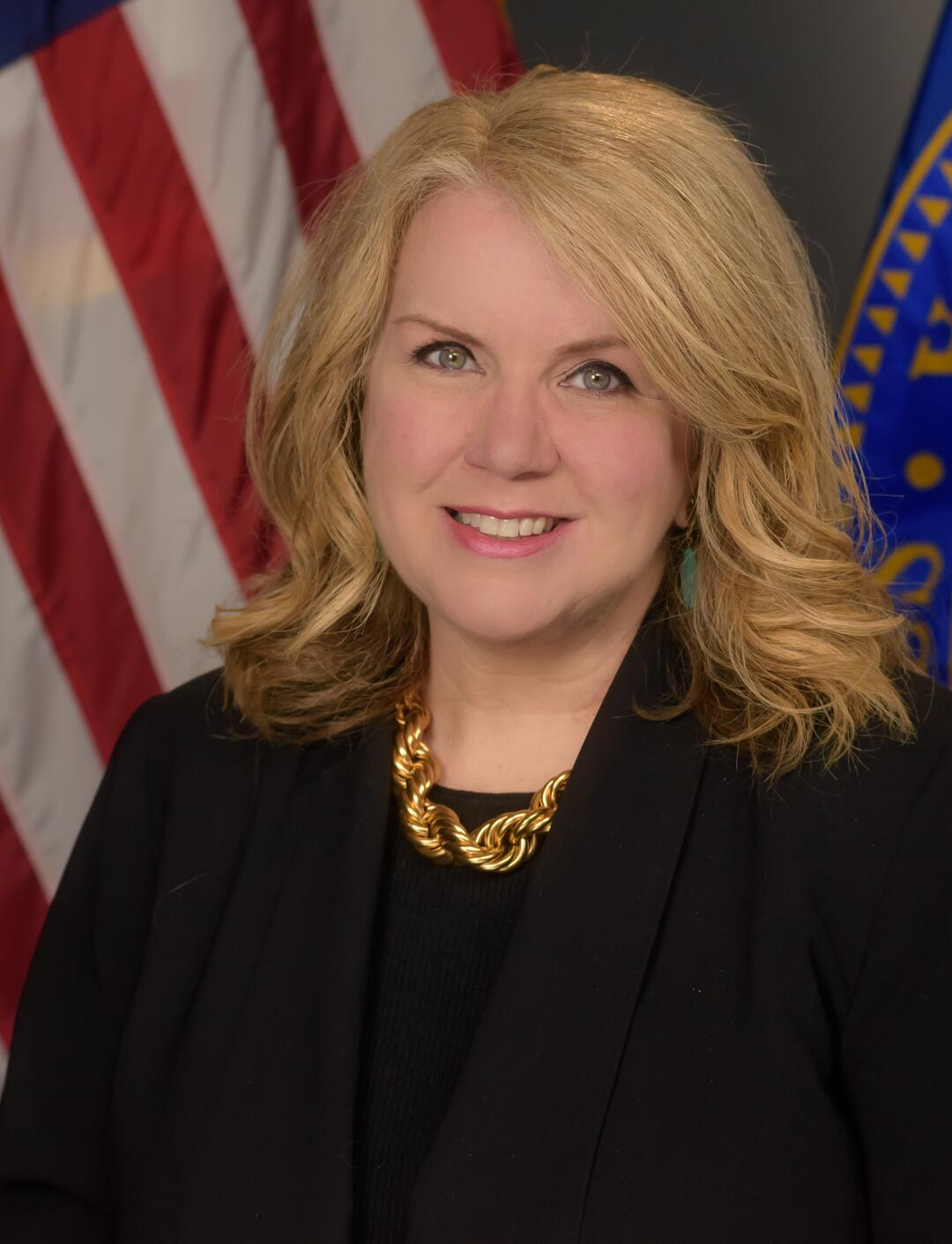

Administrator of the Health Resources and Services Administration
- In office January 6, 2022 – January 20, 2025
- President: Joe Biden
- Preceded by: Thomas J. Engels
- Succeeded by: Thomas J. Engels

White House Testing Coordinator
- In office January 20, 2021 – December 17, 2021
- President: Joe Biden
- Preceded by: Position Established
- Succeeded by: Tom Inglesby

Personal details
- Education: University of Virginia

Carole Johnson is an American health official who served as the administrator of Health Resources and Services Administration from 2022 to 2025. She was previously a member of the White House COVID-19 Response Team. Johnson is a former commissioner of the New Jersey Department of Human Services.

== Life ==
Johnson completed a master’s degree in government from the University of Virginia.

At the United States Department of Health and Human Services (DHHS), Johnson previously managed health care workforce policy issues for Health Resources and Services Administration (HRSA). She also was policy director for the Alliance of Community Health Plans, program officer with the Pew Charitable Trusts health program, and senior government relations manager with the American Heart Association.

Johnson was the commissioner of the New Jersey Department of Human Services. During her tenure as commissioner, the department expanded Medicaid coverage of mental health and substance use disorder services, created new Medicaid benefits to improve maternal health outcomes, and integrated Medicaid into the newly launched state-based Affordable Care Act marketplace. Under Johnson’s leadership, the department also substantially increased child care rates for the first time in a decade, expanded food assistance benefits, and created an Office of New Americans to support the state’s diverse communities.

Johnson was a member of the White House COVID-19 Response Team. Johnson served for more than five years as the Domestic Policy Council public health lead in the Obama White House, working on the Ebola and Zika responses, implementation of the Affordable Care Act, and combatting the opioid epidemic. In addition, she served on Capitol Hill as health staff for the U.S. Senate Special Committee on Aging and for members of the U.S. Senate Finance Committee and U.S. House of Representatives Ways and Means Committee.

Johnson was appointed by U.S. president Joe Biden to serve as the commissioner of HRSA. She began on January 6, 2022.
