= 1901 diphtheria antitoxin contamination incident =

Described as "the first modern medical disaster"

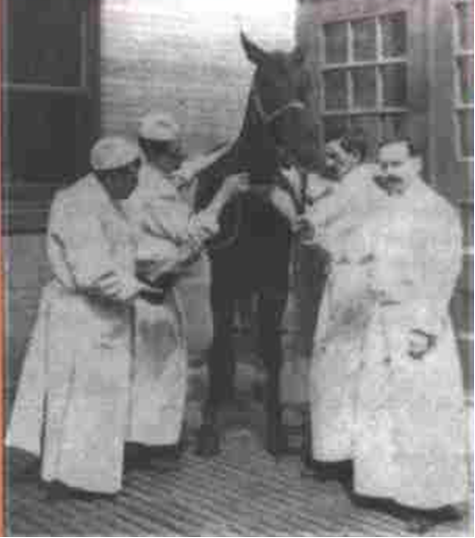
Jim

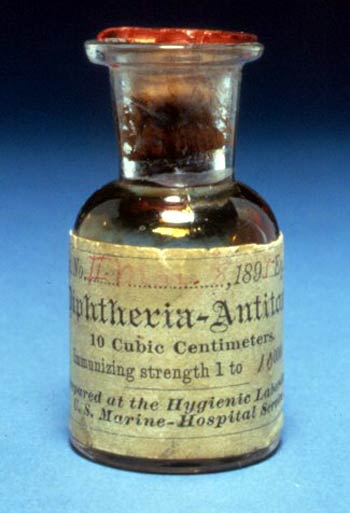
Vintage 1895 vial of diphtheria antitoxin

On October 2, 1901, a former milk wagon horse named Jim showed signs that he had contracted tetanus and was euthanized. He had been used to produce serum containing diphtheria antitoxin (antibodies against diphtheria toxin). Jim produced over 30 US quarts (7.5 US gallons; 28.5 litres) of diphtheria antitoxin in his career. After the death of a girl in St. Louis, Missouri, was traced back to Jim's contaminated serum, it was discovered that serum dated September 30 contained tetanus in its incubation phase. This contamination could have easily been discovered if the serum had been tested prior to its use. Furthermore, samples from September 30 had also been used to fill bottles labeled "August 24", while actual samples from the 24th were shown to be free of contamination.

These failures in oversight led to the distribution of antitoxin that caused the death of 12 more children, which were highly publicized by newspaper magnate Joseph Pulitzer as part of his general opposition to the practice of vaccination. This incident, and a similar one involving contaminated smallpox vaccine in Camden, New Jersey, led to the passage of the Biologics Control Act of 1902, which established the Center for Biologics Evaluation and Research. Jim's misfortune, and the ensuing tragedy and reaction, thus established a precedent for the regulation of biologics, leading to the 1906 formation of the US Food and Drug Administration (FDA). The incident has since been referred to as "the first modern medical disaster".

== See also ==
- Bundaberg tragedy, a similar incident involving contamination of diphtheria vaccine doses in Australia in 1928
- Immunology
- Inoculation
- Public health
- List of historical horses
