= Bundaberg tragedy =

1928 medical disaster

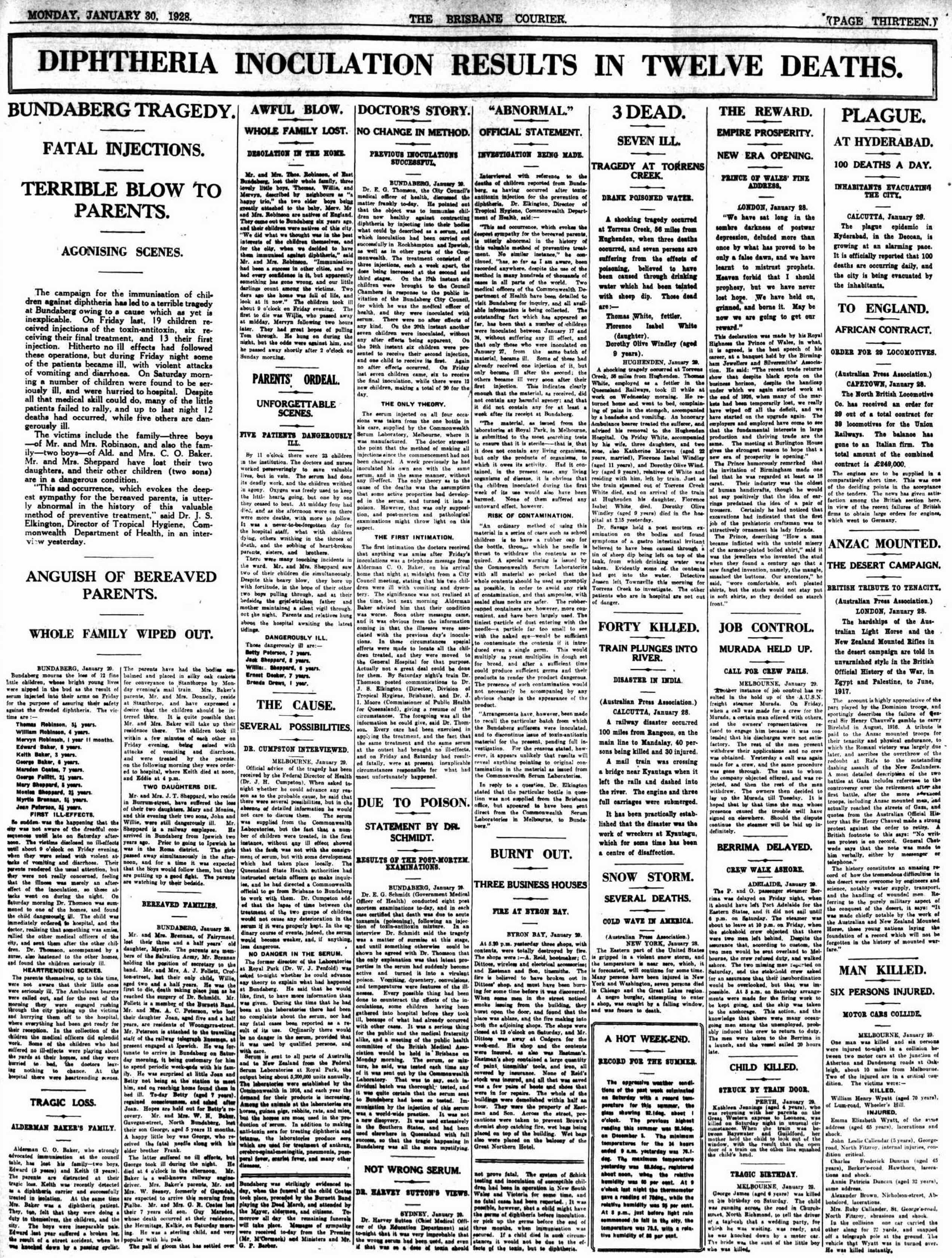
Brisbane Courier coverage of the incident

The Bundaberg tragedy (or Bundaberg disaster) was a medical disaster that occurred in January 1928, resulting in the deaths of 12 children in Bundaberg, Queensland, Australia. A royal commission concluded that the deaths were caused by the contamination of a diphtheria vaccine with the bacterium Staphylococcus aureus.

== Background ==
The Australian state of Queensland experienced frequent diphtheria outbreaks in the early 20th century, with up to 2,000 cases reported per annum. In the city of Bundaberg there were 130 cases reported in 1926 and 89 cases in 1927. The disease had a high mortality rate and in a number of years was the leading cause of childhood death in Australia.

The federal government recommended immunisation against diphtheria as early as 1921, but uptake of the diphtheria vaccine was slow. Some medical authorities felt that the effectiveness of mass immunisation had yet to be proven, while the decentralised nature of the Australian healthcare system meant that decisions on immunisation were made by local health boards and medical officers of health.

By the late 1920s, the Queensland Department of Health had initiated a policy of free immunisation against diphtheria, with the department purchasing vaccines manufactured by the federal government's Commonwealth Serum Laboratories (CSL) and distributing them to local authorities. In 1928, the joint health board covering the City of Bundaberg, the Shire of Woongarra and the Shire of Gooburrum voted to authorise an immunisation program. The scheme was to be led by Bundaberg's chief medical officer Ewing Thomson.

== Disaster ==
Thomson began the immunisation program on 17 January 1928, with each recipient intended to receive three inoculations spaced one week apart. The program was without incident until 27 January, when a total of 21 children between the ages of one and nine were inoculated. Within seven hours, 18 of the children were seriously ill with symptoms that began with vomiting and diarrhoea and progressed to fever, cyanosis, convulsions and unconsciousness. Eleven children died within 24 hours of their inoculations, while another died on the following day; many died only hours after being admitted to hospital. Three were from a single family, the Robinsons, while two other families lost two children. Thomson's son was among those inoculated, but survived.

The mass-casualty incident overwhelmed the town's two hospitals, Bundaberg General Hospital and St Vincent's Hospital, which did not have the staff or capacity to handle multiple paediatric emergencies. The hospitals' mortuary facilities were also inadequate to deal with multiple victims, with the problem exacerbated by an ongoing heat wave. With one exception, post-mortem examinations were performed by Egmont Schmidt, the government medical officer of Maryborough, who concluded that the children had died due to "acute toxaemia" of an unknown cause. Schmidt had little experience in forensic analysis, also lacking access to expert advice and facing pressure from families to certify death so that interment could proceed.

== Reaction and investigation ==
=== Health response ===
The inoculation program in Bundaberg was suspended immediately after the children's deaths, following shortly by those in the major cities of Brisbane and Melbourne. As news of the deaths spread, programs were also suspended in New Zealand and Cape Town, South Africa. All bottles of the toxin-antitoxin (TAT) serum used in Bundaberg were recalled within two days. However, it was soon discovered that the Bundaberg batch had been used in other locations without incident. An early consensus developed that the deaths had not been caused by a fault in manufacture, but rather by the treatment of the serum after it left the CSL facilities in Melbourne.

=== Political response ===
On 31 January, the day of the last victim's funeral, Prime Minister S. M. Bruce announced a royal commission into the deaths. He additionally sent federal treasurer Earle Page, a former surgeon, to Bundaberg as his personal representative. The federal government's response was coordinated by John Cumpston, the director-general of the Department of Health, a strong supporter of mass immunisation who sought to defend the reputation of his department and CSL. According to Akers & Porter (2008), "the swift announcement of an imminent Royal Commission, its open terms of reference and Page's visit, engendered scientific and political confidence".

=== Royal commission ===
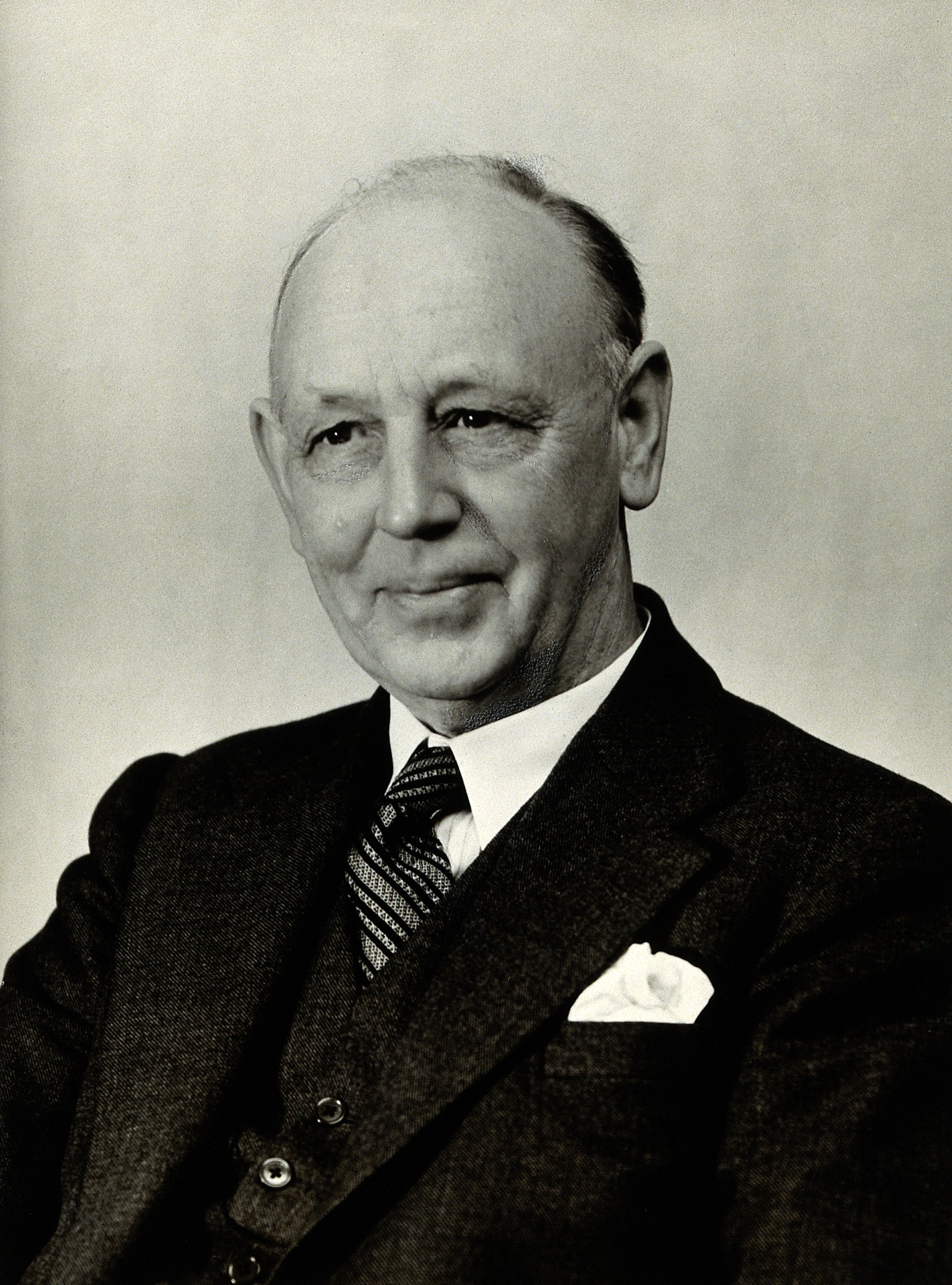
Charles Kellaway, chair of the royal commission into the children's deaths

The federal government called a royal commission into the deaths on 31 January, the day of the last victim's funeral. Hearings began on 13 February. The manufacturer of the toxin–antitoxin was Commonwealth Serum Laboratories (CSL), owned by the federal government. As a result, responsibility for the deaths was seen to lie with the federal government rather than the Queensland state government (the administrators of the immunisation program), and inquiries were conducted by the federal government.

The three commissioners were Charles Kellaway, director of the Walter and Eliza Hall Institute; Peter MacCallum, professor of pathology at the University of Melbourne; and Arthur Tebbutt, bacteriologist at Sydney's Royal Prince Alfred Hospital. Kellaway was appointed as the commission's chairman. There was some criticism of the appointment of three medical professionals. The commissioners heard evidence in Bundaberg, Stanthorpe, Toowoomba, Brisbane, Sydney, and Melbourne. The sessions were open to the press and were extensively reported. Kellaway delegated much of the commission's work to Macfarlane Burnet, his assistant director at the Hall Institute and a future Nobel Prize laureate. Burnet was able to isolate Staphylococcus aureus in both the toxin–antitoxin mixture and in pus taken from the surviving children.

Following a four-month investigation, the commission's report was presented to the House of Representatives by federal health minister Neville Howse on 13 June 1928. The Medical Journal of Australia and British Medical Journal concurred with the findings of the commission. The commission concluded that the children's deaths were the result of the serum being contaminated with the bacterium Staphylococcus aureus, but that the manufacturer CSL had contributed to the deaths by distributing bottles of serum that did not contain antiseptic.

The report made five main recommendations: that biological products intended for repeated use should contain "a sufficient concentration of antiseptic to inhibit bacterial growth"; that any biological products not containing antiseptic should be clearly labelled as such, used immediately upon opening and discarded after use; that biological products should be distributed in glass bottles to allow for easy detection of turbidity or other defects; that the federal Department of Health should investigate the substitution of toxin–antitoxin with anatoxin for future campaigns; and that medical officers overseeing vaccine campaigns should be given special postgraduate training.

The royal commission's was immediately forwarded to the state departments of health and the recommendations were "rapidly promulgated throughout the health system", with toxin–antitoxin phased out by CSL and replaced with anatoxin over a period of several years. The inquiry was praised in medical circles as "both a vindication for the safety of properly conducted immunisation campaigns and a demonstration of the value of modern medical research techniques". Its recommendations resulted in an increased focus on manufacturing and labelling standards within CSL and also influenced practices in the United Kingdom. The day after the report was issued, Prime Minister S.M. Bruce announced that the federal government would issue compensation payments to the families of the deceased and would cover the medical expenses of the surviving children.

== See also ==
- 1901 diphtheria antitoxin contamination incident, a similar incident in the United States

== Sources ==
- Akers, Harry; Porter, Suzette (2008). "Bundaberg's Gethsemane: the tragedy of the inoculated children" (PDF). Royal Historical Society of Queensland Journal. 20 (7): 261–278.
- Hobbins, Peter (2010). "'Immunisation is as popular as a death adder': the Bundaberg tragedy and the politics of medical science in interwar Australia". Social History of Medicine. 24 (2): 426–444. doi:10.1093/shm/hkq047.
- Hooker, Claire (2000). "Diphtheria, immunisation and the Bundaberg tragedy: a study of public health in Australia". Health and History. 2 (1): 52–78. doi:10.2307/40111374. JSTOR 40111374.
