= Nahid Bhadelia =

Indian-American infectious diseases physician and researcher

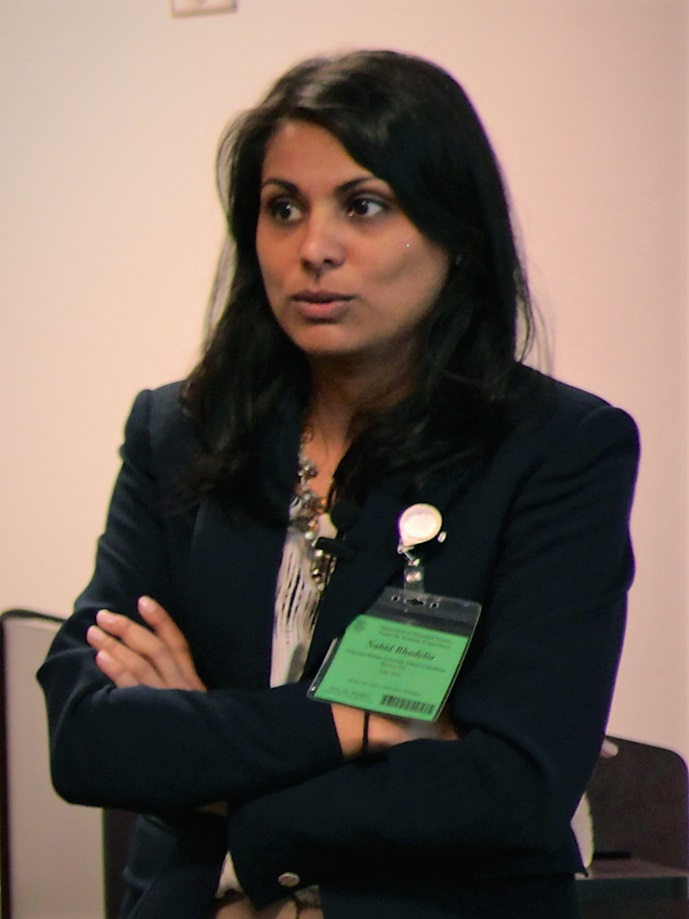
- Bhadelia lectures students at the U.S. Federal Emergency Management Agency Center for Domestic Preparedness in Anniston, Alabama in 2014
- Education: Tufts University School of Medicine, MD; Fletcher School of Law and Diplomacy, MALD; Tufts University, BS, 1999
- Known for: Infectious Disease Response
- Scientific career
- Fields: Infectious Diseases, Health Security, Outbreak Preparedness
- Workplaces: Boston Medical Center, Boston University School of Medicine

Nahid Bhadelia is an American infectious-diseases physician, founding director of the Center on Emerging Infectious Diseases (CEID) at Boston University, and an associate professor at the Boston University School of Medicine. She served as the Senior Policy Advisor for Global COVID-19 Response on the White House COVID-19 Response Team.

== Education and early career ==
Bhadelia attended Tufts University, where she received her Bachelor of Science degree. She continued her education at Tufts University School of Medicine, where she received her Doctor of Medicine. While in medical school, she served as an HIV/AIDS counselor and clinic coordinator for a student-run clinic that serves underserved populations in Malden, Massachusetts.

Bhadelia also holds a Master's degree in international affairs from the Fletcher School of Law and Diplomacy, specializing in health security with a focus on pandemic response.

== Career ==
In 1999, Bhadelia worked as the Director of National Outreach for Oxfam America, working on projects related to civic engagement of young Americans in voting and policy change issues. In 2002, she worked with Massachusetts Campus Compact on a project funded by Pew Charitable trusts to promote voting among college students. She completed her medical training in New York City at Mount Sinai Hospital and Columbia Presbyterian Hospital.

In 2011, Bhadelia began working at Boston Medical Center and Boston University School of Medicine. With a specialization in infection control and emerging pathogens, Bhadelia served as the medical director of the Special Pathogens Unit. She was also the Director of Infection Control and an Associate Director at the National Emerging Infectious Diseases Laboratories, a biosafety level 4 laboratory, which is one of six such programs for studying deadly viruses in the United States. During her career, she has worked on assessing the healthcare response to the 2009 flu pandemic that resulted from Influenza A virus subtype H1N1, the 2013-2016 Ebola virus epidemic, and the 2020 COVID-19 pandemic. She works on national task force for evaluation of experimental medical treatments for emerging infections. On May 19, 2021, it was announced that Bhadelia will lead a new research center at Boston University entitled the Center on Emerging Infectious Diseases (CEID). CEID's mission is to improve resilience against threat of emerging & epidemic infectious diseases worldwide through transdisciplinary research, global and local capacity building, training, evidence generation for policy support, and community engagement. In 2025, Bhadelia co-founded and became the director of Biothreats Emergence, Analysis, Communications Network (BEACON), a free global outbreak surveillance program based at CEID.

Role in Biocontainment Care and Special Pathogens Unit

Between 2011 and 2021, Bhadelia built from ground up and led a medical unit that specializes in the care of patients with highly communicable infectious diseases, serving as its medical director. She also served as the director of medical response to maximum containment research at NEIDL. The Special Pathogens Unit (SPU) is situated within Boston Medical Center (BMC), BU’s primary teaching hospital. Her work involved everything from engineering and infection control to training hundreds of associated healthcare workers, developing clinical care policies, and taking part in national conversations about development and stockpiling treatments for emerging diseases.

=== Role during the West African Ebola Epidemic ===
During the Western African Ebola virus epidemic, which lasted from 2013 through 2016 Bhadelia worked with the World Health Organization and Partners In Health to address the epidemic on the ground and work as a physician in Ebola Treatment Units. She was deployed to Kenema, Sierra Leone to serve as a clinician in August 2014, in Port Loko in November 2014, and returned to Sierra Leone twice more in 2015. Bhadelia applied her first-hand experience to co-developing and co-authoring a Centers for Disease Control and Prevention Safety Training Course for ebola virus disease healthcare workers. She also applied her expertise in international affairs and policy to co-author a white paper on strategies to strengthen healthcare systems while responding to a health crisis in the wake of the ebola epidemic in Sierra Leone.

In the wake of the epidemic, Bhadelia has returned to West Africa to help set up research centers to study viruses such as Ebolavirus. She is also the lead investigator on a John E. Fogarty International Center grant to establish a training program for Liberian researchers in emerging infectious diseases to build local capacity for research and treatment in the aftermath of the ebola epidemic. She also has campaigned to raise funds for local healthcare workers fighting the ebola epidemic, many of whom have gone unpaid.

=== Role during the Ebola Outbreak in Democratic Republic of Congo ===
Bhadelia serves as a clinical lead for the Joint Mobile Emerging Disease Intervention Clinical Capability (JMEDICC) program, which is a joint US-Ugandan effort to create clinical research capacity to combat viral hemorrhagic fevers in Uganda, most recently related to the Ugandan response to the 2018–2020 Ebola outbreak in the Democratic Republic of Congo.

=== Role during the COVID-19 Pandemic ===
On February 9, 2020, Bhadelia published an op-ed for The Atlantic warning about the burden of the emerging COVID-19 pandemic on healthcare systems based on her experiences as a physician on the frontlines of past epidemics. She called for the need for the international community to invest more in healthcare in the most vulnerable countries to maximize the likelihood of containing outbreaks. Even after COVID-19 reached the status of pandemic, Bhadelia continues to stress the importance of containment and mitigation strategies for healthcare workers, governments, and citizens, advocating also for the importance of COVID-19 testing in containing the virus. Bhadelia was one of the authors of the John Snow Memorandum, which points out that from evidence-based considerations a "pandemic management strategy relying upon immunity from natural infections for COVID-19 is flawed".

=== Medical communication and advocacy ===
Bhadelia has published writing in outlets such as The Atlantic NPR, Science, Washington Post and Nature recounting her experiences as a frontline physician during the ebola epidemic, providing clinical insight on new technologies related to outbreak response, and relaying her expertise as an infectious disease expert in response to the 2020 COVID-19 pandemic. Bhadelia has spoken about devastating role of stigma during outbreaks in a TedX talk. She's also an NBC News Medical contributor.

==== Selected writing for non-scientific audiences ====
- "Has The World Learned The Wrong Lessons From The Ebola Outbreak?" NPR, January 16, 2016
- "The Best Defense Against Disturbing New Diseases" The Atlantic, February 9, 2020
- “We’re losing ground against diseases we’ve already defeated” Washington Post, November 9, 2021.

== Awards and honors ==
- Fletcher Women's Leadership Award, Fletcher School of Law and Diplomacy, 2016
- Woman of the Year, INDIA New England, 2015
- Medium Elemental's “50 Experts to Trust in a Pandemic”
