= Health Resources and Services Administration =

United States government agency

- HRSA Logo

Agency overview
- Formed: September 1, 1982; 44 years ago
- Preceding agencies: Health Services Administration (1973–1982); Health Resources Administration (1973–1982)
- Jurisdiction: Federal government of the United States
- Headquarters: North Bethesda, Maryland (Rockville mailing address)
- Employees: 1,996
- Annual budget: US$12.1 billion (2021)
- Agency executives: Thomas J. Engels, Administrator, Health Resources and Services Administration; Diana Espinosa, Deputy Administrator, Health Resources and Services Administration
- Parent agency: United States Department of Health and Human Services
- Website: hrsa.gov

Footnotes
- ("HRSA" is pronounced /ˈhɜːrsə/ HUR-sə by initiates; /ˌeɪtʃ ɑːr ɛs ˈeɪ/ "H-R-S-A" is an often-heard spelling pronunciation)

The Health Resources and Services Administration (HRSA) is an agency of the U.S. Department of Health and Human Services (HHS) headquartered in North Bethesda, Maryland. It is the primary federal agency for improving access to health care services for people who are uninsured, isolated or medically vulnerable.

Comprising six bureaus and twelve offices, HRSA provides leadership and financial support to health care providers in every state and U.S. territory. Its grantees provide health care to uninsured people, people living with HIV/AIDS, people who are low-income, and pregnant women, mothers and children. They train health professionals and improve systems of care in rural communities.

HRSA oversees organ, bone marrow and cord blood donation. It supports programs that prepare against bioterrorism, a program to compensate people who experience vaccine adverse events, and maintains databases that protect against health care malpractice and health care waste, fraud and abuse.

== Functions ==
HRSA's $10 billion budget (FY 2015) provides direct health care to 23 million people. Its health center program supports medical, oral and behavioral health services to uninsured and underinsured individuals through a nationwide network of community-based clinics and mobile medical vans. By bringing comprehensive primary and preventive health care services to inner-city and rural communities that otherwise would be without them, health centers improve the health of their communities and relieve pressure on overburdened hospital emergency rooms. The agency also recruits doctors, nurses, dentists and others to work in areas with too few health care professionals.

HRSA funds life-sustaining medication and primary care to about half of the estimated number of people living with HIV/AIDS in the United States. The agency also furnishes funds and expertise that save and improve the lives of millions of mothers and children. HRSA also oversees all organ, tissue, and blood-cell donations. It is the federal agency primarily responsible for pediatric poison control. It also maintains databases that track cases of health care malpractice and compensates individuals judged to be harmed by vaccinations. HRSA monitors trends in the health care workforce and forecasts future demand. Scholarships and academic loan programs encourage greater minority participation in the health professions and seek to maintain an adequate supply of primary care professionals.

== Organization ==
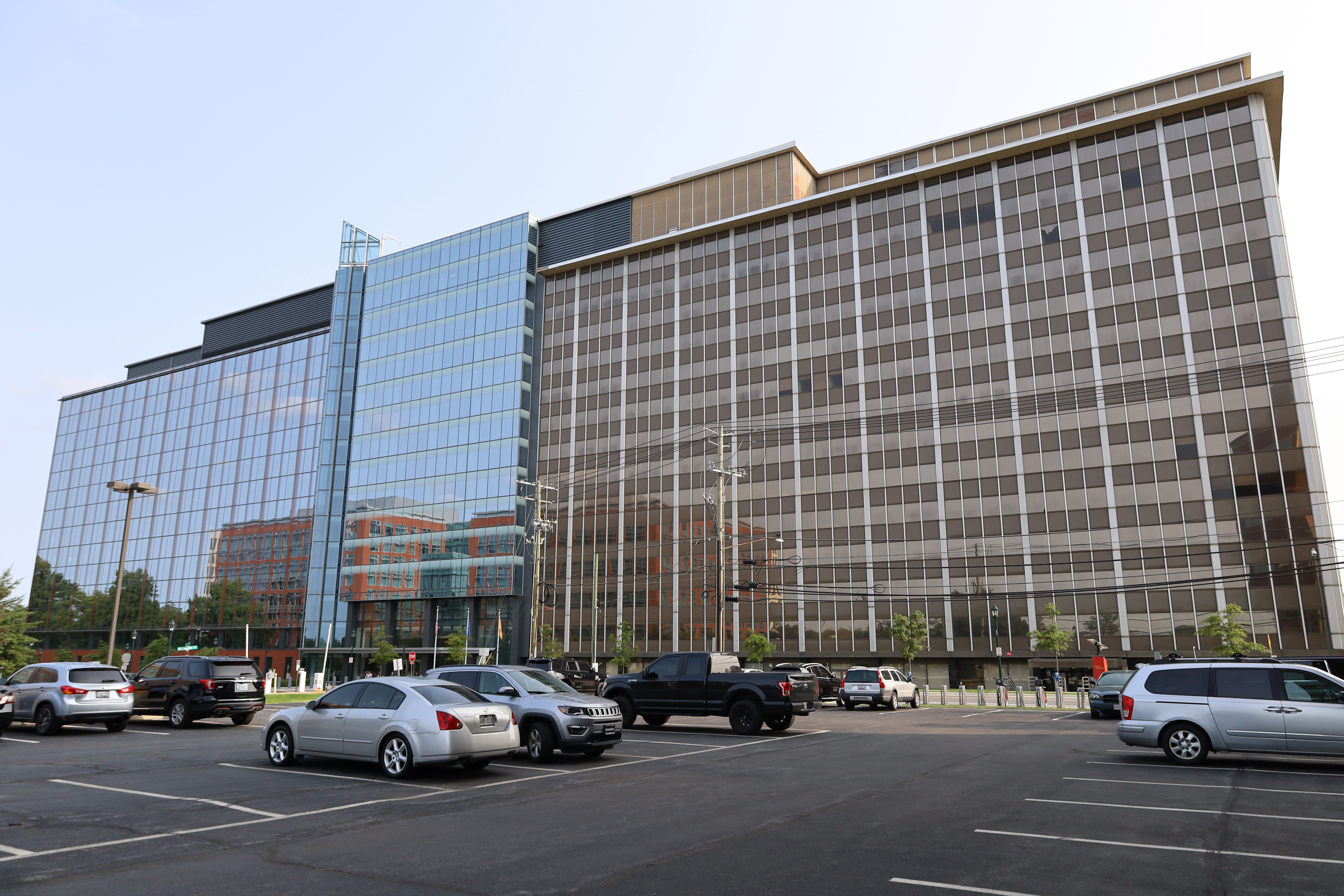
HRSA headquarters at 5600 Fishers Lane in Rockville, Maryland

=== Primary health care ===
HRSA funds almost 1,400 health center grantees that operate more than 10,400 clinics and mobile medical vans. Health centers deliver primary and preventive care to over 16 million low-income patients in every state, the District of Columbia, Puerto Rico, the U.S. Virgin Islands, and U.S. possessions in the Pacific.

=== HIV/AIDS ===
HRSA's Ryan White HIV/AIDS Program provides primary care, support services and antiretroviral drugs for about 530,000 low-income people. The program also funds training, technical assistance and demonstration projects designed to slow the spread of the epidemic in high-risk populations. These services avert more costly in-patient care and improve the quality of life for those living with the virus.

=== Maternal and child health ===
HRSA administers a broad range of programs for pregnant women, mothers, infants, children, adolescents and their families, and children with special health care requirements. The largest of the programs, the Maternal and Child Health Services Block Grant to States, supports local efforts to reduce infant mortality and childhood illness and control costs associated with poor pre- and neo-natal care. The Block Grant includes State Formula Block Grants, Special Projects of Regional and National Significance (SPRANS), and Community Integrated Service Systems (CISS) projects. Other vital missions include Universal Newborn Hearing Screening, Traumatic Brain Injury, Healthy Start, Sickle Cell Service Demonstrations, Family to Family Health Information Centers, Emergency Medical Services for Children, and autism.

Among the most successful public health initiatives in U.S. history, HRSA's Maternal and infant health programs annually serve more than 34 million people.

=== Rural health ===
In order to make health care more accessible for the 60 million residents of rural America, HRSA funds programs that integrate and streamline existing rural health care institutions and aid in the recruitment and retention of physicians in rural hospitals and clinics. HRSA's telehealth program uses information technology to link isolated rural practitioners to medical institutions over great distances. Many of these activities are designed and operated out of the Agency's Office of Rural Health Policy.

=== Health workforce ===
The agency strives to ensure a health care workforce that is diverse, well-trained and adequately distributed throughout the nation. In exchange for financial assistance through National Health Service Corps scholarships and student loan repayment programs, more than 28,000 clinicians have served in some of the most economically deprived and geographically isolated communities in America over the past 35 years.

=== Healthcare systems ===
HRSA oversees the nation's organ and tissue donation and transplantation systems, by way of supervising the work of the United Network for Organ Sharing, a nonprofit organization that is contracted to run the complex organ and tissue donation and transplantation system in the U.S.

HRSA oversees a drug discount program for certain safety-net health care providers.

HRSA also supports the nation's poison control centers and vaccine injury compensation programs, which distribute awards to individuals and families who have been injured by certain vaccines, after proving it to the National Vaccine Injury Compensation Program. The awards come from a trust fund that is funded by an excise tax on all vaccines. Whenever anyone gets a vaccine, there is a $.75 excise tax. The fund currently has almost $4 billion available (as of September 2019) for compensations to petitioners and for attorneys fees and costs of the program.

== History ==
=== Predecessors ===
Most of HRSA's bureaus have predecessors within the Public Health Service (PHS), coming from either its Bureau of Medical Services or the Community Health Divisions of its Bureau of State Services. During the PHS reorganizations of 1966–1973, these were both absorbed into the short-lived Health Services and Mental Health Administration (HSMHA). The goal was to coordinate divisions with similar focus with a holistic rather than fragmented approach; however, it came to be seen as large and unwieldy.

In 1973, HSMHA was abolished and split into four parts: the Centers for Disease Control and National Institute of Mental Health were spun off within PHS, and the remaining functions were split between the newly established Health Services Administration and Health Resources Administration.

A few of HRSA's programs have origins outside PHS, though. The Maternal and Child Health Bureau originates from a 1969 split of the Children's Bureau, with its special projects, training, and research programs moving into PHS. The Bureau of Primary Health Care's system of Community Health Centers were initially part of the Office of Economic Opportunity, but were moved into PHS in 1974.

=== Establishment and later history ===
HRSA was established on September 1, 1982, when the Health Resources Administration and the Health Services Administration were merged. Dr. Robert Graham was the first administrator of the Health Resources and Services Administration.

In November 2019, Thomas Engels was appointed administrator of the Health Resources and Services Administration, replacing administrator George Sigounas. Engels left the post on January 20, 2021.

On January 20, 2021, the incoming Biden administration named Deputy Administrator Diana Espinosa, a career civil servant, to serve as Acting Administrator until a permanent successor is named. On December 17, 2021, it was announced that Carole Johnson would be named as Administrator, having previously served as testing coordinator on the White House COVID-19 Response Team. Johnson took up her administrator role in the first week of January 2022.

On August 1, 2022, the HRSA vaccine injury database revealed that 6,088 claims had been made for injuries/deaths attributed to the COVID-19 vaccination, only a very small number of which had been denied, but no payouts had yet occurred. Any payout resulting from the remaining granted claims will automatically trigger a Congressional review of the PREP Act's medical fraud section, as vaccines were certified to Congress as being "safe and effective." In addition, under the 1986 Healthcare Quality Improvement Act, Congress is responsible for reviewing the HRSA vaccine injury database every three years.
