= Malignant (book) =

2020 book by Vinay Prasad

- First edition cover
- Author: Vinay Prasad
- Genre: Non-fiction
- Publisher: Johns Hopkins University Press
- Publication date: 2020

Malignant: How Bad Policy and Bad Evidence Harm People with Cancer is a nonfiction book by Vinay Prasad, published in 2020 by Johns Hopkins University Press.

== Content ==
The book delves into cancer policy, oncological drug regulation, and clinical trial design, examining how many marginal and unproven cancer therapies are pushed to market on the basis of hype and bias.

== Reviews ==
According to Benjamin Chin Yee, who wrote an in-depth review of Malignant, "Prasad does not shy away from controversy, and lays out his argument in lucid, readable prose." Tahla Burki writes in the Lancet Haematology, "Prasad outlines how the US Food and Drug Administration (FDA) approves cancer therapies on the basis of arbitrarily assigned surrogate endpoints that typically have no bearing on overall survival or quality of life. He examines how a complex web of conflicts-of-interests pollutes policy debates and expert recommendations, and how studies ask irrelevant questions in unrepresentative patient populations."
