= Abbe Gluck =

American legal scholar

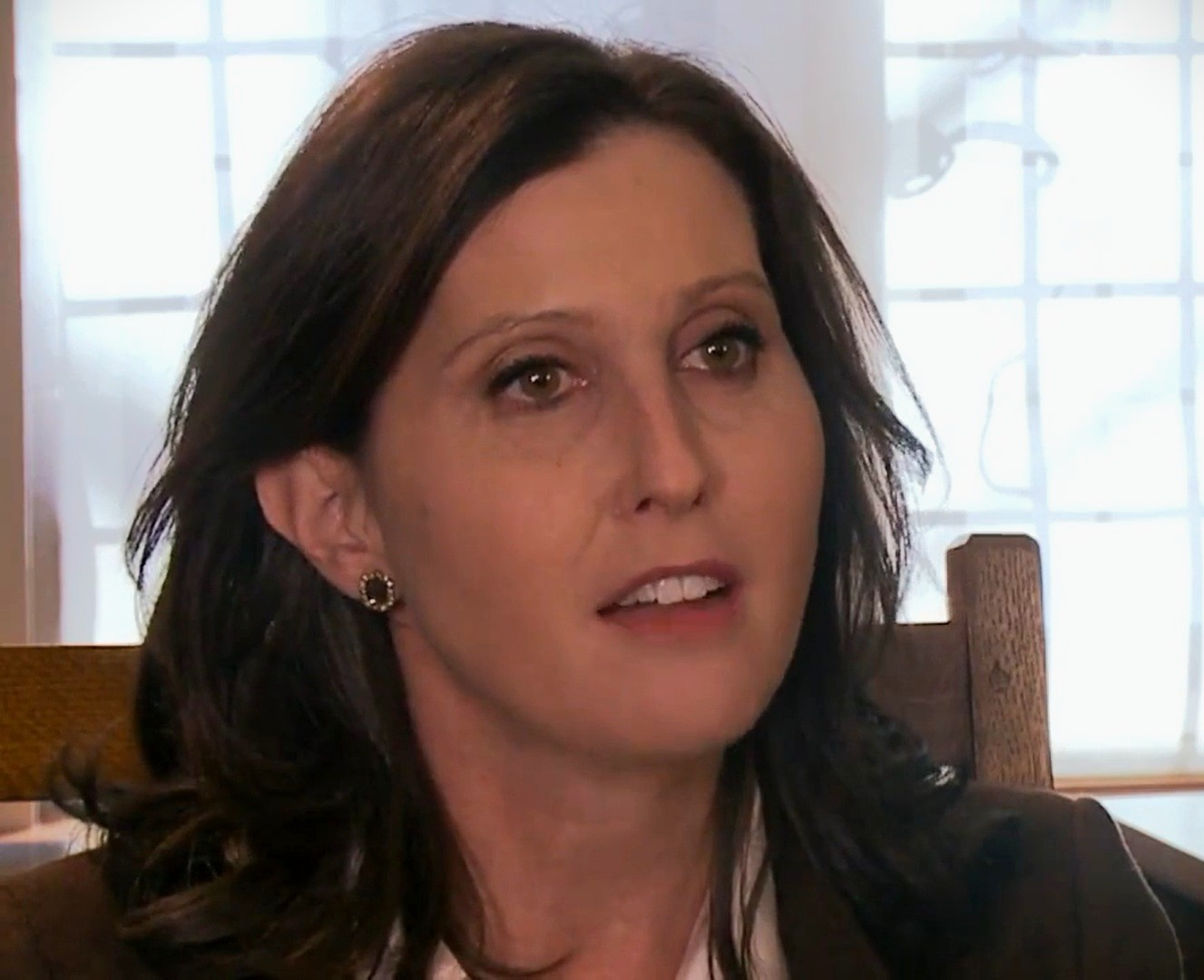
Gluck in 2015

Abbe R. Gluck is an American lawyer who serves as the Alfred M. Rankin Professor of Law and faculty director of the Solomon Center for Health Law and Policy at Yale Law School. She is also professor of internal medicine at Yale Medical School and professor at Yale's institution for social and policy studies. She previously served as special counsel to the president from November 2020 to November 2021, in which capacity she served as the lead counsel for the White House COVID-19 Response Team; during this time, she also served as a member of the White House Counsel’s Office.

== Education ==
Gluck received her B.A. summa cum laude from Yale University and her J.D. from Yale Law School. She went on to serve as a clerk for United States Court of Appeals for the Second Circuit Judge Ralph K. Winter and for Supreme Court of the United States Justice Ruth Bader Ginsburg.

== Career ==
Gluck began working at Yale Law School in 2012. She had previously worked for Columbia Law School, and for numerous elected officials, including New Jersey Governor Jon Corzine, New York City Mayor Michael Bloomberg, and United States Senator Paul Sarbanes of Maryland. In 2022, she was one of seven finalists to be chosen for the position of Chief Judge of New York by New York Governor Kathy Hochul.
