= Frederick R. Maxfield =

Biochemist

- Education: Union College (BS); Cornell University (PhD)
- Known for: Endocytosis, intracellular cholesterol transport, cellular membrane trafficking
- Awards: NIH MERIT Award; Highly Cited Researcher

Frederick R. Maxfield is an American biochemist and the Vladimir and Wanda Toscanini Horowitz Distinguished Professor in the Department of Biochemistry at Weill Cornell Medicine. He is recognized for his work on cellular membrane trafficking, endocytosis, and intracellular cholesterol transport.

== Early life and education ==
Maxfield completed his Bachelor of Science in chemistry at Union College in June 1971. He earned his PhD in biophysical chemistry from Cornell University in May 1977 under the supervision of Harold A. Scheraga. From August 1977 to December 1979, he was a postdoctoral fellow in the Laboratory of Molecular Biology at the National Cancer Institute under Ira Pastan.

In 1979, Maxfield joined the faculty at the New York University School of Medicine as an Assistant Professor of Pharmacology, later rising to Professor. He moved to Columbia University Irving Medical Center in 1987 as Professor of Pathology and Physiology. In 1995, he was appointed Vladimir and Wanda Toscanini Horowitz Professor and Chair of Biochemistry at Weill Cornell Medical College, a department leadership role he held until 2021. He also served as Interim Chair of Cell and Developmental Biology at Weill Cornell from 2014 till 2021.

== Research ==
The Maxfield laboratory utilizes quantitative biological and physical methods, including fluorescence microscopy, to analyze dynamic processes in living cells. Early investigations focused on measuring endosomal pH levels, mapping endocytic pathways, and characterizing intracellular cholesterol transport mechanisms.

His research focuses on cellular lipid transport, endocytosis, and neurodegenerative diseases. His laboratory identified digestive exophagy; a process where macrophages degrade aggregated low-density lipoproteins (LDL) extracellularly, contributing to foam cell formation in atherosclerosis. His team also studied intracellular cholesterol transport via STARD4, microglial degradation of amyloid beta in Alzheimer's disease, and experimental treatments for Niemann–Pick disease, type C.

Former lab members include physician-scientist Peter Marks, who completed his Ph.D. under Maxfield's supervision.

== Leadership and honors ==
Maxfield has served as President of the Harvey Society and the New York Society for Experimental Microscopy. In 2020, he was elected a Fellow of the American Society for Cell Biology.

In 2019, he received Fletcher McDowell Award from Burke Neurological Institute.

== Publications ==
Maxfield has authored or co-authored nearly 270 peer-reviewed scientific publications. Selected publications include:

- Maxfield FR, Schlessinger J, Schechter Y, Pastan I, Willingham MC (1978). "Collection of insulin, EGF, and alpha2-macroglobulin in the same patches on the surface of cultured fibroblasts and common internalization". Cell. 14 (4): 805–810. doi:10.1016/0092-8674(78)90336-7. PMID 80283.
- Tycko B, Maxfield FR (1982). "Rapid acidification of endocytic vesicles containing alpha2-macroglobulin". Cell. 28 (3): 643–651. doi:10.1016/0092-8674(82)90219-7. PMID 6176331.
- Yamashiro DJ, Tycko B, Fluss SR, Maxfield FR (1984). "Segregation of transferrin to a mildly acidic (pH 6.4) para-Golgi compartment in the recycling pathway". Cell. 37 (3): 789–800. doi:10.1016/0092-8674(84)90414-8. PMID 6204769.
- Marks PW, Maxfield FR (1990). "Transient increases in cytosolic free calcium appear to be required for the migration of adherent human neutrophils". The Journal of Cell Biology. 110 (1): 43–52. doi:10.1083/jcb.110.1.43. PMC 2115989. PMID 2295683.
- Mayor S, Rothberg KG, Maxfield FR (1994). "Sequestration of GPI-anchored proteins in caveolae triggered by cross-linking". Science. 264 (5167): 1948–1951. Bibcode:1994Sci...264.1948M. doi:10.1126/science.7516582. PMID 7516582.
- Paresce DM, Ghosh RN, Maxfield FR (1996). "Microglial cells bind and internalize aggregates of the Alzheimer's disease amyloid beta-protein by a scavenger receptor". Neuron. 17 (3): 553–565. doi:10.1016/s0896-6273(00)80187-7. PMID 8816718.
- Mukherjee S, Ghosh RN, Maxfield FR (1997). "Endocytosis". Physiological Reviews. 77 (3): 759–803. Bibcode:1997PhyRv..77..759M. doi:10.1152/physrev.1997.77.3.759. PMID 9234965.
- Maxfield FR, McGraw TE (2004). "Endocytic recycling". Nature Reviews Molecular Cell Biology. 5 (2): 121–132. Bibcode:2004NRMCB...5..121M. doi:10.1038/nrm1315. PMID 15040445.
- Haka AS, Grosheva I, Chaing E, Buxbaum AR, Baird BA, Pierini LM, Maxfield FR (2009). "Macrophages create an acidic extracellular hydrolytic compartment to digest aggregated lipoproteins". Molecular Biology of the Cell. 20 (23): 4932–4940. doi:10.1091/mbc.e09-07-0559. PMC 2785736. PMID 19812250.
- Pipalia NH, Subramanian K, Mao S, Ralph H, Hutt DM, Scott SM, Balch WE, Maxfield FR (2017). "Histone deacetylase inhibitors correct the cholesterol storage defect in most NPC1 mutant cells". Journal of Lipid Research. 58 (4): 695–708. doi:10.1194/jlr.M072140. PMC 5376033. PMID 28193631.
- TCW J, Qian L, Pipalia NH, Chao MJ, Liang SA, Shi Y, Jain BR, Bertelsen SE, Kapoor M, Marcora E, Sikora E, Andrews EJ, Martini AC, Karch CM, Head E, Holtzman DM, Zhang B, Wang M, Maxfield FR, Poon WW, Goate AM (2022). "Cholesterol and matrisome pathways dysregulated in astrocytes and microglia". Cell. 185 (13): 2213–2233. doi:10.1016/j.cell.2022.05.017. PMC 9258284. PMID 35750051.
- Jacquet RG, González Ibáñez F, Picard K, Funes L, Khakpour M, Gouras GK, Tremblay MÈ, Maxfield FR, Solé-Domènech S (2024). "Microglia degrade Alzheimer's amyloid-beta deposits extracellularly via digestive exophagy". Cell Reports. 43 (12) 115052. doi:10.1016/j.celrep.2024.115052. PMC 11760508. PMID 39644493.
