= Robert Blair (political advisor) =

American political advisor

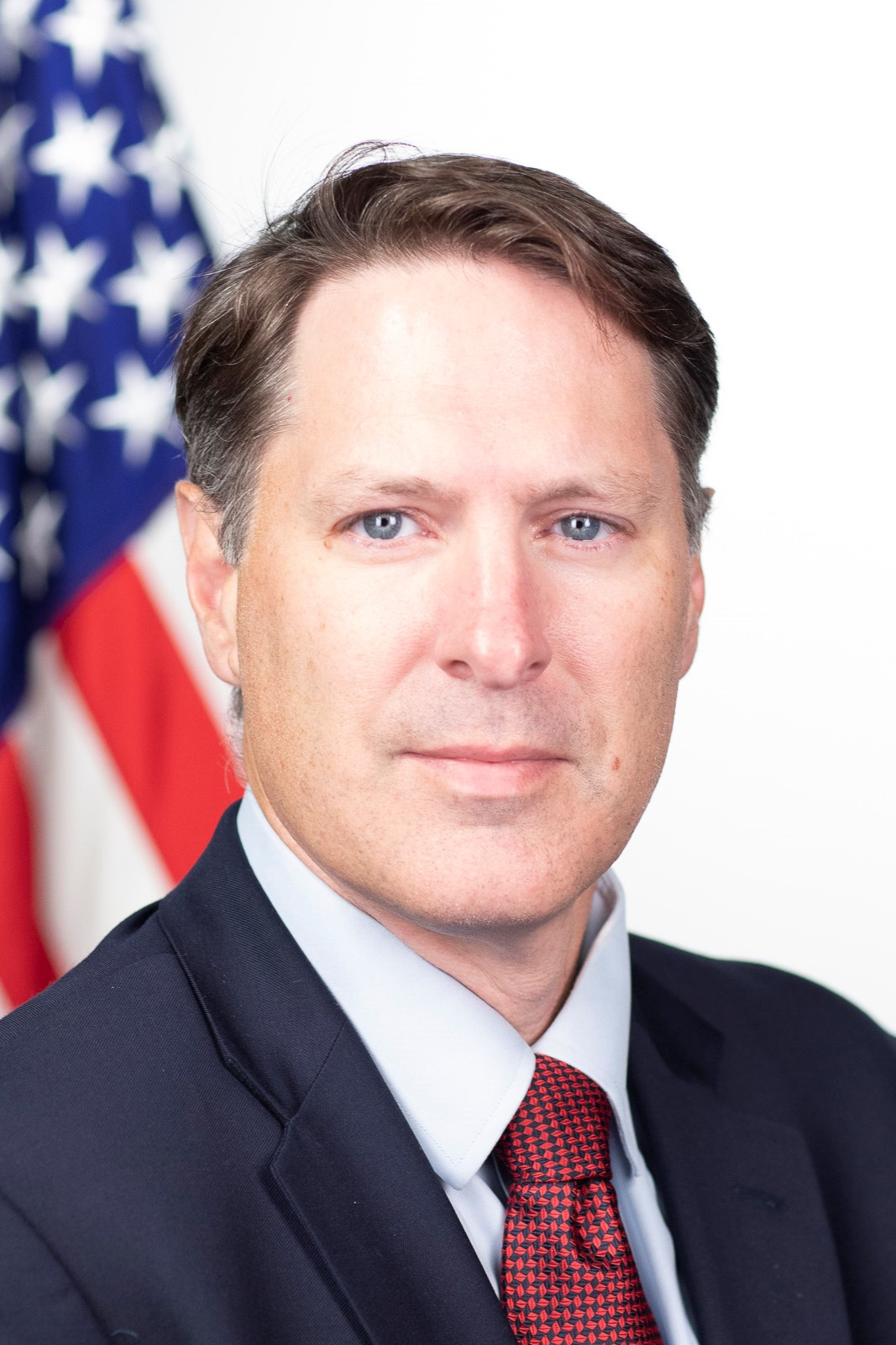

Special Representative for International Telecommunications Policy
- In office December 18, 2019 – January 20, 2021
- President: Donald Trump

Assistant to the President and Senior Advisor to the Chief of Staff
- In office January 4, 2019 – January 20, 2021
- President: Donald Trump

Personal details
- Born: Robert Benjamin Blair; December 18, 1972 (age 53) Alexis, Illinois, U.S.
- Party: Republican
- Education: Cornell University (BS); Tufts University (MA, MALD)

Robert Benjamin Blair (born December 18, 1972) is an American government official who served as the United States Special Representative for International Telecommunications Policy. Blair previously served as the clerk of the United States House Appropriations Subcommittee on Defense until 2017.

== Early life and education ==
Blair grew up near Alexis, Illinois, the son of school teachers and the oldest of three children. Blair graduated from Alexis High School in 1990. He attended Cornell University in Ithaca, New York, completing his Bachelor of Sciences degree in 1994. He attended Tufts University from 1998 to 2001, where he earned a Masters of Arts from the Graduate School of Arts and Sciences and a Masters of the Arts of Law and Diplomacy from the Fletcher School of Law and Diplomacy.

== Career ==
Blair has served in the federal government for more than 20 years in both the legislative and executive branches. He began his federal service as a Peace Corps Volunteer in the Central African Republic from 1994 to 1996. His Peace Corps tour was ended by a series of violent revolts by the country's military. From 2001 to 2003, Blair was a Presidential Management Fellow at the United States Department of State, where he focused on international health diplomacy.

From 2003 until 2017, Blair served on the staff of the United States House Committee on Appropriations. Over that period he was clerk. (staff director) for both the Defense subcommittee and Energy and Water subcommittee. His first assignment on the Committee was as a professional staff member on the Foreign Operations subcommittee.

Blair joined the Trump Administration in March 2017 as the Associate Director for National Security Programs at the Office of Management and Budget. He was one of the staff members listening to Trump's July 25, 2019 phone call with Ukrainian President Volodymyr Zelenskyy. He was subpoenaed to testify about military aid to Ukraine and refused, citing direction from the White House and advice from the Department of Justice.

Blair was named in December 2019 by the President as the Special Representative for International Telecommunications Policy, tasked with leading efforts to "promote the development, deployment, and operation of the next-generation telecommunications infrastructure that will provide the security, data privacy, and stability required for a fully interconnected world". Blair works closely with Larry Kudlow, Director of the National Economic Council, who is in charge of the Trump Administration's 5G initiative. In this role, he has travelled to many other countries to discuss 5G and telecommunications policy.

Blair has received the Meritorious and Superior Honor Awards from the Department of State, and the Decoration for Distinguished Civilian Service from the Department of the Army.

Blair was appointed a member of the White House Coronavirus Task Force in January 2020.

In April 2020, it was announced that Blair would become the Department of Commerce's director of policy and work on domestic 5G policy.
