= Karen Midthun =

American infectious disease internist and physician-scientist

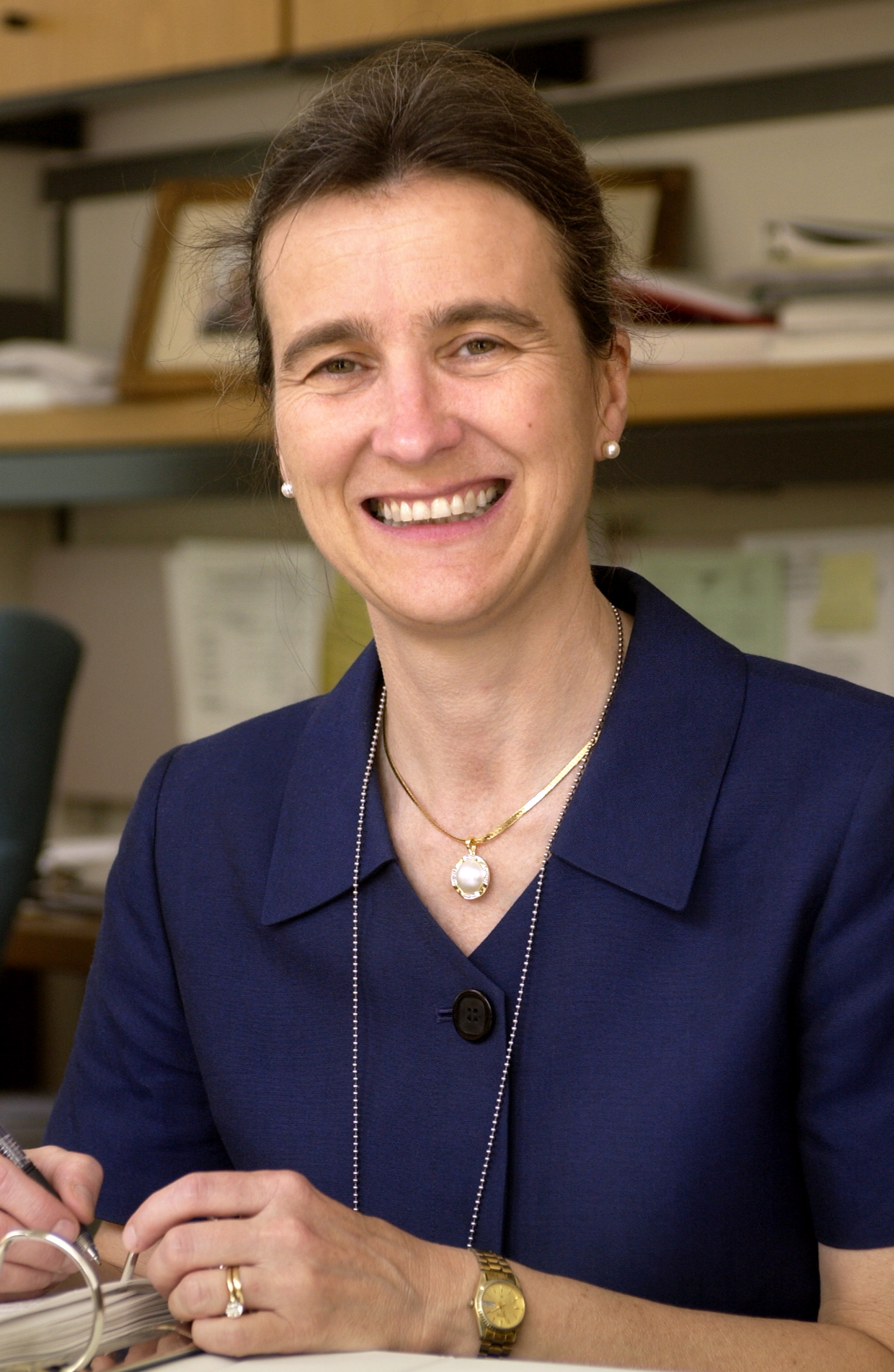
- Education: Massachusetts Institute of Technology; George Washington University
- Scientific career
- Fields: Infectious diseases, internal medicine, biopharmaceuticals
- Workplaces: Johns Hopkins University; Food and Drug Administration

Karen Midthun is an American infectious disease internist and physician-scientist. She worked at the Food and Drug Administration from 1993 to 2016, ultimately holding the position of director of the Center for Biologics Evaluation and Research.

== Education ==
Midthun received a bachelor's degree from the Massachusetts Institute of Technology and a M.D. from the George Washington University School of Medicine & Health Sciences. She trained as a resident in internal medicine at Johns Hopkins Hospital and as a fellow in infectious diseases at Johns Hopkins Hospital and the National Institute of Allergy and Infectious Diseases.

== Career ==
Midthun was on the faculty of the department of international health at the Johns Hopkins Bloomberg School of Public Health, where she was involved in the clinical development of investigational vaccines and was an attending physician at the Johns Hopkins Hospital.

In 1993, she joined the Food and Drug Administration (FDA) as a medical officer. She later became director of the Center for Biologics Evaluation and Research (CBER) Office of Vaccines Research and Review. She was promoted to CBER deputy director and later director. She retired in January 2016. During her tenure at the FDA, Midthun oversaw the approval of biologics, including influenza vaccines using novel technologies, vaccines for pneumococcal and meningococcal diseases, human papillomavirus, and treatments for rare blood disorders. She also contributed to the development of regulatory frameworks for human cell and tissue products and collaborated with other FDA centers on biosimilar policy.

Midthun is a fellow of the Infectious Diseases Society of America and a member of the American College of Physicians and the American Society for Virology.
