= Jere E. Goyan =

American pharmacist

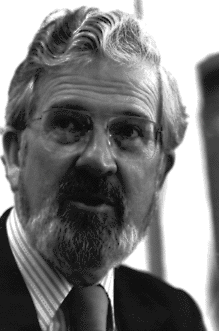

13th Commissioner of Food and Drugs
- In office October 21, 1979 – January 20, 1981
- President: Jimmy Carter
- Preceded by: Donald Kennedy
- Succeeded by: Arthur H. Hayes Jr.

Personal details
- Born: August 3, 1930; Oakland, California, U.S.
- Died: January 17, 2007 (aged 76); Houston, Texas, U.S.
- Political party: Democratic

Jere E. Goyan (August 3, 1930 – January 17, 2007) was an American pharmacist who served as Commissioner of Food and Drugs from 1979 to 1981.

He died on January 17, 2007, in Houston, Texas at age 76.
