= Vinay Prasad =

American hematologist-oncologist

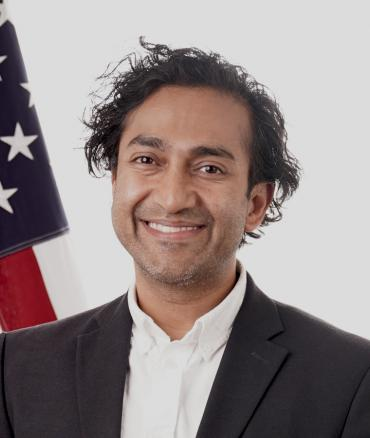

Director of the Center for Biologics Evaluation and Research
- In office May 6, 2025 – April 30, 2026
- President: Donald Trump
- Preceded by: Peter Marks

Personal details
- Education: Michigan State University (BA); University of Chicago (MD); Johns Hopkins University (MPH)

Vinay Kashyap Prasad is an American hematologist-oncologist and health researcher, who served as the director of the Center for Biologics Evaluation and Research from May 2025 to April 2026 at the Food and Drug Administration (FDA). He is a professor of epidemiology and biostatistics at the University of California, San Francisco (UCSF), and is the author of the books Ending Medical Reversal (with Adam Cifu, 2015), and Malignant (2020), both from Johns Hopkins University Press.

In May 2025, during the second Trump administration, he was appointed head of the Center for Biologics Evaluation and Research at the Food and Drug Administration (FDA). Following criticism of the FDA's decisions on multiple vaccine reviews, reports appeared that he would leave his position at the end of April 2026.

== Early life and education ==
Prasad was raised in a suburb of Cleveland, before moving to Northern Indiana, outside of Chicago. His parents immigrated from India.

Prasad attended Michigan State University (MSU), where he took courses in health care ethics and physiology. In 2005, Prasad graduated summa cum laude from MSU with a double major in philosophy and physiology. He gave the commencement speech to the College of Arts and Letters on behalf of the philosophy department. Prasad received his medical degree from University of Chicago in 2009, and completed a residency in internal medicine at Northwestern University in 2012. That same year, he was certified in internal medicine by the American Board of Internal Medicine, and earned a Master's of Public Health from Johns Hopkins University in 2014. In 2015, Prasad completed a joint National Institutes of Health (NIH) fellowship, the Hematology Oncology Fellowship at the National Cancer Institute (NCI) and the National Heart, Lung, and Blood Institute (NHLBI).

== Career ==
Prasad is a cancer drug and health policy researcher, and has studied the financial conflicts in drug approvals.

From 2015 to 2020, Prasad was assistant and then associate professor at the Oregon Health & Science University. In that time, worked at San Francisco General Hospital. Prasad was elevated to the rank of full professor of hematology-oncology at UCSF, before departing to work at the FDA in 2025.

In 2023, reporters have surmised, as a part of an application to work in an editorial capacity, Prasad submitted a curriculum vitae (CV) to the publisher, John Wiley & Sons. Paul Goldberg, writing for The Cancer Letter, a publication with focused reporting on matters related to U.S. Governmental cancer programs, one that has been called both a "watchdog" and "muckraking", called attention to the fact in a report and subsequent related podcast, that an element of that CV, Prasad's claim to have been a member of the prestigious President's Cancer Panel (in 2016–2017), was a false representation, as Prasad had only ever presented before the Panel, and never had been a member of it.

Effective May 6, 2025, Prasad was appointed head of the FDA's Center for Biologics Evaluation and Research (CBER), after the previous head was forced to resign by Secretary Kennedy. In March 2026, The Wall Street Journal and National Public Radio reported that Prasad would leave his position the following month.

=== Book-length publications ===
In 2015, Prasad published the book Ending Medical Reversal with physician and academic Adam Cifu. In the spring of 2020, Prasad published the book Malignant: How Bad Policy and Bad Evidence Harm People with Cancer.

=== Other media work ===
Prasad has hosted the podcast Plenary Session, and has blogged at MedPage Today.

== Views and reception ==
=== Medical reversals ===
In 2011, Prasad and colleagues published a research letter in the Archives of Internal Medicine. Charles Bankhead, a senior editor at MedPageToday, covered the topic, outlining the paper's primary point, which was the high prevalence of research articles demonstrating findings that deviated from the accepted standard of treatment at the time. Separately, "Retraction Watch" reported on Prasad's personal remarks about the paper, saying "For a long time, we were interested by what we believe to be a pervasive problem in modern medicine. Namely, the spread of new technologies and therapies without clear evidence that they work, which are later (and often after considerable delay) followed by contradictions, which, in turn, after yet another delay, is followed by changes in practice and reimbursement."

Matthew Hoffman, writing in 2012 for MedPageToday's KevinMD covered a paper by Prasad and colleagues on "When to abandon ship" when it comes to failing medical practices and treatments. Hoffman builds on the authors' proposed barriers to market entrance, such as evidence of effectiveness in large randomized controlled studies before broad usage, and links them to the insidious aspects of healthcare, such as profit and status. In 2013, Prasad and colleagues addressed the necessity for randomized controlled trials for the inferior vena cava filter (VCF) despite the intervention's bio-plausibility. The authors suggest that since the intervention has known adverse effects but an uncertain benefit, well-designed studies are necessary to shed light on the intervention's efficacy. The JAMA Internal Medicine article received widespread media attention, with Reuters' Genevra Pittman interviewing Prasad about his further views on the intervention. In the interview, Prasad advises against filter placement in all but the most extreme instances, owing to his perceived lack of proof and possibility for adverse events.

In 2013, Prasad's paper A Decade of Reversal: An Analysis of 146 Contradicted Practices was published; The article was covered in a piece by The Huffington Post, which highlights a key lesson from the paper: patients should become more involved in their health care decisions rather than assuming a prescribed medication or device is beneficial. Patients may do this by asking their physician pertinent questions, such as what patient outcomes the intervention improved. Additionally, the article discusses the concept of healthcare cost. With growing anxiety about the expense of healthcare, utilizing limited resources on questionable medical practices with a weak evidence base threatens to jeopardize both the healthcare economy and patient health. Additionally, the authors of a Lancet Oncology editorial remark that "almost 10% of practice reversals occurred in oncology," suggesting that certain fields of medicine may be more susceptible to medical reversals than others.

=== COVID response ===
In October 2021, during the COVID-19 pandemic, Prasad prompted social media controversy when he published an essay warning that restrictions on movements during future pandemics could lead to a suspension of elections, and compared such an outcome to the rise of Adolf Hitler's Third Reich. Bioethicist Arthur L. Caplan said that Prasad's arguments were specious and ignorant, and science historian Robert N. Proctor said that Prasad was "trivializing the genuine harms to liberty posed by 1930s fascism".

In November 2021, Prasad expressed his opinion that pediatricians should warn parents about risks of COVID immunization such as myocarditis. However, physician Jonathan Howard noted that Prasad was selectively omitting that myocarditis from the vaccine was always mild and that COVID disease itself carried much higher risks, including a worse form of myocarditis which would not be consistent with the tenets of medical informed consent.

In January 2022, the conservative periodical City Journal published an opinion piece by Prasad in which he attempted to demonstrate that the American public health organizations were not being honest in their response to the COVID-19 pandemic. Writing for Science-Based Medicine, epidemiologist Lynn Shaffer criticized Prasad's article for the various "mistruths" it contained about face masks as a COVID-19 mitigation measure, for example the unevidenced claim that mask wearing was stunting children's language development. In Shaffer's view Prasad's writing "lean[s] heavily on pushing people's emotional hot buttons" and amounted to a form of fearmongering.

Prasad was an early member of the Urgency of Normal, a group that in 2022 campaigned against quarantines and mask mandates in schools during the COVID-19 pandemic. He spoke in support of repealing such mandates in a March 2022 interview.

=== Medical skepticism ===
Prasad has criticized other medical skeptics for their choices of topics to tackle, including homeopathy, as being poor use of their time. Skeptics David Gorski and Steven Novella published criticisms of and counter-arguments to Prasad's stance, pointing out the perils of not challenging alternative medicine during a pandemic.

=== Engagement with Robert Kennedy's ideas ===
Earlier in 2023, Prasad showed support for the ideas of Robert Kennedy Jr. However, according to physician David Gorski, Prasad did not show sufficient understanding of bad faith debate. In November 2023, the levels of kindergarten vaccine exemptions rose to the highest level in years. Prasad mentioned this outcome but did not acknowledge his role in causing this outcome, per physician Jonathan Howard. In 2024, Prasad expressed criticism for the funding decisions of the NIH as well as support for more cluster randomized controlled trials. However, according to physician David Gorski, Prasad again demonstrated insufficient understanding of the limitations of these randomized controlled trials as well as how the NIH's funding decisions work.

=== FDA ===
On May 20, 2025, during his tenure as CBER head, Prasad, with FDA Commissioner Marty Makary, published an article in The New England Journal of Medicine announcing that the FDA would limit COVID-19 vaccines to people over 65 or at high risk of serious illness and would require manufacturers to conduct additional large studies to evaluate their benefits for children and healthy younger adults.

In late July 2025, Prasad quit after political provocateur Laura Loomer said he was a "progressive leftist saboteur". (Note: "Loomer had released misleadingly edited audio to suggest that that Prasad had admitted sticking pins in a Trump voodoo doll, when the full audio made it clear that he was talking about the kind of thing an imagined liberal Trump-hater would do." The Guardian Vinay Prasad returns to FDA days after leaving under pressure from Laura Loomer August 9, 2025.) Journalist Antonia Hitchens reports that Prasad had been attempting to place a hold on a muscular-dystrophy drug for safety reasons, but that it would have cost Sarepta Therapeutics, the drug's manufacturer, millions of dollars. Shortly after the hold went into effect, Loomer began attacking Prasad in a series of online posts, declaring that he had "infiltrated" the Administration as a "Marxist Trojan Horse". The following week, Prasad resigned, "under pressure", according to Hitchens. Hitchens states that "to Loomer's critics, the timing and intensity of her campaign against Prasad seemed like a form of lobbying." A Trump Administration official told Antonia Hitchens that "the consensus among political leadership" was that the attack on Prasad "was a directed assault by corporate forces." Prasad resumed his role in August 2025, after less than two weeks away. In explaining the absence, FDA Commissioner Marty Makary stated that "He [Prasad] saw some media headlines and didn't want to be a distraction", and that Prasad was convinced to return.

On August 29, 2025, Prasad demanded of YouTube that six of his critic Jonathan Howard's videos be taken down. Subsequently, Howard's entire channel, a record of the medical positions of various doctors and administrators, was removed.

Prasad has been the subject of numerous internal complaints at the FDA, including "retaliation against subordinates and verbally berating staff." In February 2026, the FDA refused to review Moderna's application for an mRNA flu vaccine. Stat and The Wall Street Journal reported that Prasad had single-handedly made the decision, overruling scientists at the agency.

In November 2025, Prasad sent a 3,000-word memo to FDA staff saying the agency would change the process for approving vaccines, and claiming without evidence that ten children had died as a result of Covid vaccination. The memo said that the figure came from an "initial analysis" of 96 deaths, but did not offer further details. Prasad characterized the claim as a "profound revelation". Twelve former FDA commissioners described Prasad's memo as a "a threat to evidence-based vaccine policy and public health security". Former deputy director CBER Phil Krause, who was mentioned approvingly in Prasad's memo, said that while he supported Prasad's call for gathering more data on vaccines, he considered the change to the vaccine approval process "destructive" of what "has been an excellent system", and called for "radical transparency" and for Prasad to publish evidence for his claims about fatalities. Paul Offit said the claims were both "irresponsible" and "dangerous"; Peter Marks said the memo's content was taken from the anti-vaccine playbook. To date, no evidence the COVID-19 vaccine killed children has been released by the FDA.

In March 2026, The Wall Street Journal and National Public Radio reported Prasad to be leaving his FDA CBER position the following month.

== Personal life ==
As of February 2026, Prasad lives in the San Francisco Bay area.

== Selected works ==
- Prasad, Vinayak & Cifu, Adam S. (2015). Ending Medical Reversal: Improving Outcomes, Saving Lives. Baltimore, MD: Johns Hopkins University Press. doi:10.1353/book.49286. ISBN 978-1-4214-5108-4. Project MUSE book 49286.
- Prasad, Vinayak (2020). Malignant: How Bad Policy and Bad Evidence Harm People with Cancer. Baltimore, MD: Johns Hopkins University Press. doi:10.1353/book.74312. ISBN 978-1-4214-3764-4. Project MUSE book 74312.
