= Tomato effect =

Mistaken rejection of medical theory

The tomato effect occurs when effective therapies for a condition are rejected because they do not make sense in the context of the current understanding or theory of the disease in question. The name refers to the fact that tomatoes were rejected as a food source by most North Americans until the end of the 19th century, because the prevailing belief at the time was that they were poisonous.

A parallel concern is medical reversal, which is when new clinical information is based on new clinical trials or understanding of a disease, contradicting clinical practice. Medical reversal implies the original clinical practice failed to achieve success or had harms that outweighed benefits. That is contrasted with the phenomenon of replacement where a useful clinical practice is replaced by one that works better.

== Examples ==
Tomatoes were becoming a staple food in Europe by the 1560s; they were shunned in North America since they were considered poisonous until the 1820s. Similarly, willow tree bark extract was ignored to provide relief of pain and fever, and it was not until the late 1800s with the commercial production of salicylate (also known as aspirin) that this treatment was prescribed to patients.

In 1753, it was established that scurvy can be treated with lemon juice. Despite this knowledge, it was considered an imbalance of the humors until the mid 1800s.
