= Medical reversal =

Contradiction of clinical practice by newer and more rigorous trials

Medical reversal refers to when a newer and methodologically superior clinical trial produces results that contradict existing clinical practice and the older trials on which it is based. This leads to an intervention that was widely used falling out of favor, because new evidence either demonstrates that it is ineffective or that its harms exceed its benefits. It is distinct from replacement, which occurs when a newly developed medical treatment supersedes an older, less effective one as the standard of care. Medical reversals are caused when a treatment is widely adopted even when there is not compelling evidence for its safety and effectiveness. For example, an intervention may be adopted because it "makes sense", or because there are observational studies supporting its putative benefits. The negative effects of such reversals include harm to patients who received the intervention when it was considered relatively safe and effective, as well as reducing public trust in medicine.

The term, medical reversal, was coined in 2011 by Vinay Prasad, Victor Gall and Adam Cifu in a research letter published in the Archives of Internal Medicine (now JAMA Internal Medicine).

The term evidence reversal has also been proposed to refer to the same concept as medical reversal, but with a broader scope, including other scientific disciplines in addition to medical science.

The tomato effect is a parallel concern. But, instead of clinical trials producing a different result, it is about changes in theory or the current understanding of a disease.

== Prevalence ==
A 2011 study of one year of original New England Journal of Medicine publications found that 13% of them constituted medical reversals. A 2013 study of a decade of medical journal articles found that of the 363 articles focused on standard of care practices, 146, or about 40%, led to reversals of the practice. A 2019 study of over 3,000 randomized controlled trials published in three prominent general medical journals concluded that 396 of these trials constituted medical reversals. The most common disease category among the reversals identified was cardiovascular disease.

== Diethylstilbestrol ==
One example of medical reversal is diethylstilbestrol (DES). In the 1940s diethylstilbestrol was used to treat endometriosis until it was determined that it had the opposite effect and increased the risk of endometriosis in the treated women.

In cases where this was given to pregnant women, DES was found to cause cancers in girls and women who had been exposed to this medication in utero when their mothers were pregnant The United States Food and Drug Administration subsequently withdrew approval of DES as a treatment for pregnant women.

It was later determined that DES can also cause other major medical complications in those exposed. In the exposed daughters of exposed women, those complications include not only the cancers previously discussed, but also an increased risk of miscarriage, premature birth, and endometriosis.
