= Adam Cifu =

American physician

Adam Seth Cifu
- Born: New York City
- Occupations: Physician, academic, author and researcher
- Awards: Distinguished Educator/Mentor Award; Biological Sciences Division, University of Chicago

Academic background
- Education: Haverford College; Cornell University Medical College

Academic work
- Institutions: The University of Chicago
- Website: https://www.adamcifu.com/

Adam Seth Cifu is an American physician, academic, author, and researcher. He is Professor of Medicine and Associate Director of the Bucksbaum Institute for Clinical Excellence at the University of Chicago.

Adam Cifu has authored over 140 peer-reviewed publications on clinical practice, medical decision-making, medical reversal, and general internal medicine. He is the co-author of a textbook on clinical reasoning, Symptom to Diagnosis: An Evidence-Based Guide, and a book about medical decision making for the lay audience, Ending Medical Reversal: Improving Outcomes, Saving Lives. He, together with Scott Stern, hosted the podcast S2D: The Symptom to Diagnosis Podcast and currently hosts The Clinical Excellence Podcast.

== Education ==
Adam Cifu attended the Dalton School in New York City. He received his bachelor's degree (with honors) in chemistry from Haverford College in 1989, and a medical degree from Cornell University Medical College (now Weill Cornell Medicine) in 1993. He completed his internal medicine residency at the Beth Israel Hospital (now in Beth Israel Deaconess Medical Center) in 1996, and then served as the Primary Care Chief Resident.

== Career ==
Adam Cifu joined the faculty of the University of Chicago as an Assistant Professor of Medicine in 1997. He was promoted to Associate Professor in 2005, and to Professor of Medicine in 2013.

== Research ==
Adam Cifu's has conducted meta-research with his primary contribution being in the field of medical reversal.

A medical reversal occurs when a robust clinical trial produces results that contradict existing clinical practice and the older, less methodologically sound trials on which it is based. The term was coined in 2011 in an article by Vinay Prasad, Victor Gall, and Adam Cifu published in the Archives of Internal Medicine (now JAMA Internal Medicine).

Cifu and Prasad published extensively on the topic. In one large study, Cifu, Prasad, and collaborators reviewed all of the original research articles published in the New England Journal of Medicine between 2001 and 2010. They identified 146 common medical practices that offered no net benefits. They also focused on low-value practices and patterns of medical research, and found out that reversal of established medical practice occurs across all classes of medical practice. In a 2012 paper, Cifu and colleagues argued that established practices must be abandoned if they are shown to be ineffective.

Cifu and Prasad brought together much of their research on medical reversal in a book entitled Ending Medical Reversal: Improving Outcomes, Saving Lives. Abigail Zuger reviewed the book in The New York Times writing that the book concerns itself with "how often modern medicine reverses itself, analyzing why it happens, and suggesting ways to make it stop."

== Medical education ==
Adam Cifu taught clinical medicine and evidence-based medicine at the Pritzker School of Medicine at the University of Chicago for decades. His teaching included medical the courses Medical Evidence and Critical Appraisal of the Landmark Medical Literature. He is the co-author of the textbook, Symptom to Diagnosis: An Evidence Based Guide. The book, originally published in 2006, is currently in its fourth edition. The book teaches an evidence-based, step-by-step process for evaluating, diagnosing, and treating patients based on their clinical complaints. Doody's Review stated that the book is "useful as a refresher for established clinicians when the more common diagnoses are not the cause of a patient's complaints." Cifu and co-author Scott Stern hosted the podcast S2D: The Symptom to Diagnosis Podcast in which they shared a case and diagnosis based on each chapter in the book.

== Health humanities ==
Cifu has published many health humanities essays in medical journals on topics such as the death of his patients, the changes in a physician's practice over time, and the variability of practice quality from day to day. His most highly viewed article concerns advice to students starting medical school. He is a founder of the Sensible Medicine blog.

== Bibliography ==
=== Books ===
- Symptom to Diagnosis: An Evidence Based Guide, Fourth Edition (2019) ISBN 9781260121124
- Ending Medical Reversal: Improving Outcomes, Saving Lives (2019) ISBN 9781421429045

=== Selected articles ===
- Prasad, V., Gall, V., & Cifu, A. (2011). The frequency of medical reversal. Archives of internal medicine, 171(18), 1675–1676.
- Prasad, V., Cifu, A., & Ioannidis, J. P. (2012). Reversals of established medical practices: evidence to abandon ship. Jama, 307(1), 37–38.
- Prasad, V., Vandross, A., Toomey, C., Cheung, M., Rho, J., Quinn, S., ... & Cifu, A. (2013, August). A decade of reversal: an analysis of 146 contradicted medical practices. In Mayo Clinic Proceedings (Vol. 88, No. 8, pp. 790–798). Elsevier.
- Cifu, A. S., & Davis, A. M. (2017). Prevention, detection, evaluation, and management of high blood pressure in adults. Jama, 318(21), 2132–2134.
