= Thomas J. Engels =

American politician

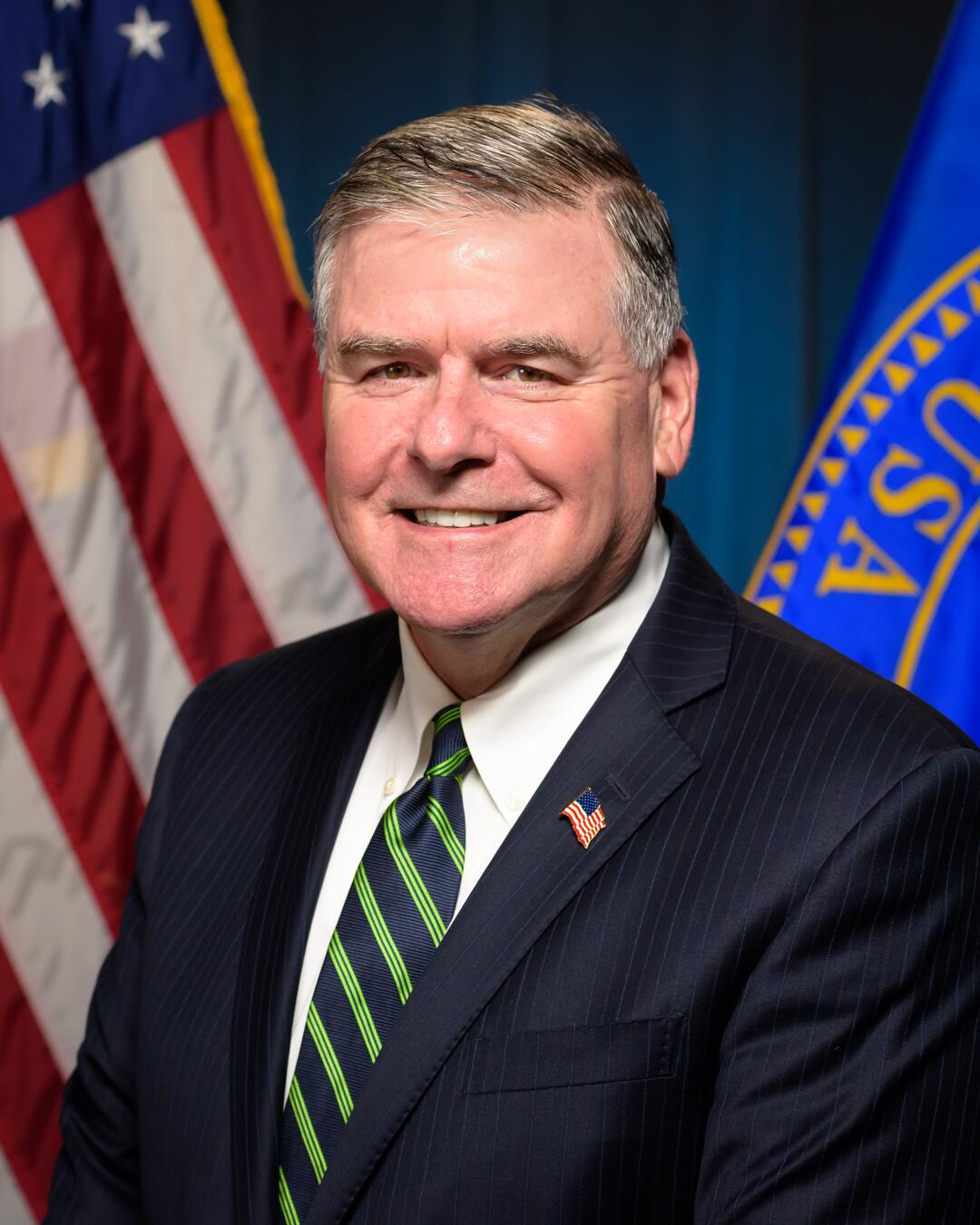

Administrator of the Health Resources and Services Administration
- Incumbent
- Assumed office February 11, 2025
- President: Donald Trump

Thomas J. Engels is an American politician who serves as the administrator of the Health Resources and Services Administration of the United States Department of Health and Human Services during the second Trump Administration. He previously held the position from 2019 to 2021 in the first Trump Administration.

== Career ==
Thomas Engels began his political career as Wisconsin governor Tommy Thompson's deputy press secretary. He served in various political roles within Wisconsin, such as working as the Government Affairs Director for the Wisconsin State Telecommunications Association, Vice President of Public Affairs at the Pharmacy Society of Wisconsin, and the Assistant Deputy Secretary at the Wisconsin Department of Safety and Professional Services.

Serving as the deputy secretary of the Wisconsin Department of Health Services from 2015 to 2019, Thomas Engels expanded mental health services, implemented an electronic system for managing state medical records, and increased staffing at long-term care facilities. Additionally, he addressed the opioid epidemic during his service on the Governor's Task Force on Opioid Abuse.

During Thomas Engels' time serving as Deputy and Acting Administrator of the Health Resources and Services Administration (HRSA) since April 2019, he was responsible for increasing access to health care for those who are isolated by geography, impoverished, or medically incapable. This office involved providing grants from the federal Department of Health and Human Services (HHS) to state and local governments, medical training programs, and health care providers. He focused on confronting the opioid epidemic, increasing the workforce providing behavioral health services, and improving medical access for rural communities. He implemented the Provider Relief Fund, providing around $117 billion in payments to medical providers addressing the COVID-19 pandemic.

On May 15, 2020, the White House announced Mr. Engels appointment to the White House Coronavirus Task Force.

In February 2025, Engels was named as HRSA Administrator by President Donald Trump.
