= Biologics Control Act =

1902 US law

Biologics Control Act of 1902
- Long title: An Act to regulate the sale of viruses, serums, toxins, and analogous products in the District of Columbia; to regulate interstate traffic in said articles, and for other purposes.
- Nicknames: Virus-Toxin Law
- Enacted by: the 57th United States Congress
- Effective: July 1, 1902

Citations
- Public law: 57-244
- Statutes at Large: 32 Stat. 728, Chapter 1378

Legislative history
- Signed into law by President Theodore Roosevelt on July 1, 1902

The Biologics Control Act of 1902, also known as the Virus-Toxin Law, was the first law that implemented federal regulations of biological products such as vaccines in the United States. It was enacted in response to two incidents involving the deaths of 22 children who had contracted tetanus from contaminated vaccines. This law paved the way for further regulation of drug products under the Pure Food and Drug Act of 1906 and the Federal Food, Drug, and Cosmetic Act of 1938. Biologics control is now under the supervision of the U.S. Food and Drug Administration (FDA).

== History ==
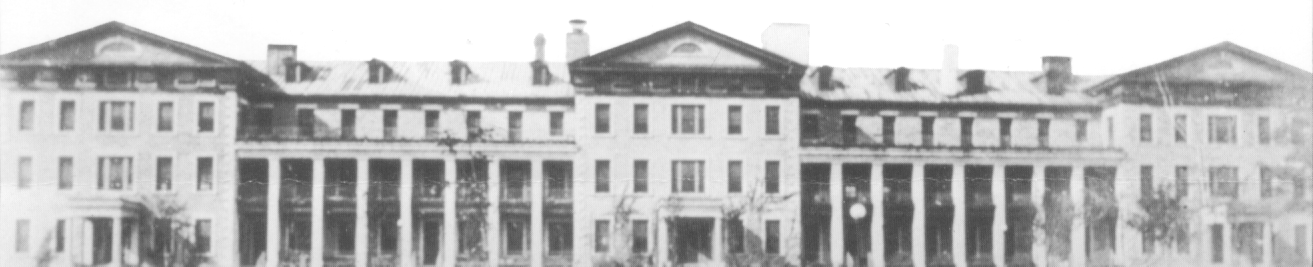
The Marine Hospital, Staten Island, N.Y. In 1887, National Institute of Health began as a single room Laboratory of Hygiene for bacteriological investigation established by the U.S. Marine Hospital Service at Stapleton, Staten Island, New York. From 1887 to 1891, the Laboratory was located in the attic of the Marine Hospital on Staten Island.

When the large scale production of vaccines and anti-toxin serum began in the late 19th century, the United States had no government regulation of biological products. During a 1901 outbreak of diphtheria in St. Louis, Missouri, a 5-year-old girl died after being given contaminated diphtheria antitoxin that was produced from blood of an infected horse. After the contaminated serum ultimately killed thirteen children, the St. Louis Board of Health's record-keeping failures prompted a national outcry. Combined with nine children in Camden, New Jersey, dying from contaminated smallpox vaccines that same year, Congress was prompted by the Hygienic Laboratory and the Medical Society of the District of Columbia to pass the Biologics Control Act on July 1, 1902.

== Contents of the Act ==
The Biologics Control Act established a board to oversee the implementation of regulations of biological products. The board consisted of the Surgeon-General of the Army, the Surgeon-General of the Navy, and the Surgeon-General of the Marine Hospital Service, and was to be overseen by the Secretary of the Treasury. This board was given the power to issue, suspend, and revoke licenses to produce and sell biological products. The Biologics Control Act also mandated that all products be labeled accurately with the name of the product and the address and license number of the manufacturer. Laboratories could be subjected to unannounced inspections by the Treasury Department. The punishment for the violation of this law was a fine of up to $500 or up to a year in prison.

== Institutions ==
The Laboratory of Hygiene of the Marine Hospital Service, established on Staten Island, NY, in 1887, was in charge of testing biologics before the Biologics Control Act. It was moved to Washington, D.C., in 1891, and renamed the Hygienic Laboratory of the Public Health and Marine Hospital Service in 1902. The Hygienic Laboratory was responsible for renewing licenses annually, testing products, and performing inspections. In 1930, the Ransdell Act transformed the Hygienic Laboratory into the National Institute of Health and gave it a larger role in public health research. In 1948, the name was changed again to the National Institutes of Health, as it encompassed many institutes and centers dedicated to biomedical research. In 1972, biologics regulation was moved to the Food and Drug Administration and later became known as the Center for Biologics Evaluation and Research (CBER).

== Impact ==
The Biologics Control Act set a precedent for the federal regulation of biologics such as vaccines and blood components. With the development of biotechnology, the FDA's Center for Biologics Evaluation and Research (CBER) has taken a larger role in reviewing and approving new biological products intended for medical purposes, including probiotics, xenotransplantation and gene therapy.
