= White House COVID-19 Response Team =

U.S. presidential task force

COVID-19 Response Team
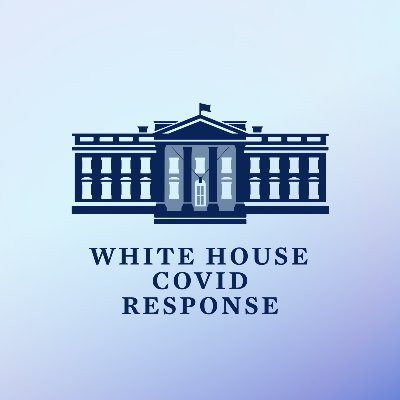

Agency overview
- Formed: January 20, 2021
- Preceding agencies: COVID-19 Advisory Board; White House Coronavirus Task Force; Operation Warp Speed
- Dissolved: May 2023
- Superseding agency: Office of Pandemic Preparedness and Response Policy
- Type: White House Office
- Jurisdiction: United States
- Parent agency: Executive Office of the President of the United States
- Website: whitehouse.gov

The White House COVID-19 Response Team was a task force during the presidency of Joe Biden to respond to the COVID-19 pandemic in the United States. It was set up by President Joe Biden on his first day in office – January 20, 2021 – and replaced President Donald Trump's White House Coronavirus Task Force and President Biden's transitional COVID-19 Advisory Board.

The task force was established by Executive Order 13987. The task force disbanded in May 2023 when the COVID-19 emergency officially ended in the United States.

In July 2023, the Biden Administration created the Office of the Pandemic Preparedness and Response Policy to help prepare the United States for the next pandemic.

== Members ==
Member	Current	Appointment
Joe Biden	President of the United States	January 20, 2021
Kamala Harris	Vice President of the United States	January 20, 2021
Ashish Jha	Coordinator of the COVID-19 response	April 5, 2022
Lisa Barclay	Deputy Coronavirus Response Coordinator	April 13, 2022
David A. Kessler	Chief Science Officer of COVID Response; Former Commissioner of Food and Drugs; Former Co-chair of the COVID-19 Advisory Board; Former Head of Operation Warp Speed	January 20, 2021
Vivek Murthy	Surgeon General of the United States	January 20, 2021
Abbe Gluck	Special Counsel	January 20, 2021
Eduardo Cisneros	Director of Intergovernmental Affairs	January 20, 2021
Ben Wakana	Director of Strategic Communications and Engagement	January 20, 2021
Clarke Humphrey	Digital Director	January 20, 2021
Cyrus Shahpar	Data Director	January 20, 2021
Tom Inglesby	Testing Coordinator	January 3, 2022
Thomas Tsai	Testing and Treatments Coordinator	June 1, 2022
Tim Manning	Supply Coordinator	January 20, 2021
Nahid Bhadelia	Senior Policy Advisor for the Global COVID-19 Response	July 15, 2022
Rochelle Walensky	Director of the Centers for Disease Control and Prevention	January 20, 2021

== Former members ==
Member	Current	Appointment	End of tenure
Andy Slavitt	White House Senior Advisor	January 20, 2021	June 9, 2021
Bechara Choucair	Vaccinations Coordinator	January 20, 2021	November 22, 2021
Carole Johnson	Testing Coordinator	January 20, 2021	December 17, 2021
Jeff Zients	Covid-19 Response Coordinator; Assistant to the President; Counselor to the President	January 20, 2021	April 5, 2022
Natalie Quillian	Deputy Covid-19 Response Coordinator	January 20, 2021	April 13, 2022
Anthony Fauci	Chief Medical Advisor to the President and Chief Medical Adviser for COVID Response; Director of the National Institute of Allergy and Infectious Diseases; Former member of the White House Coronavirus Task Force	January 20, 2021	December 31, 2022
