= Diphtheria antitoxin =

Treatment for diphtheria

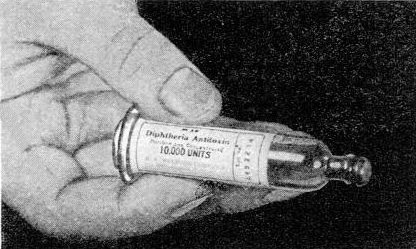
- Vial of 10,000 units, circa 1925.

Clinical data
- AHFS/Drugs.com: Micromedex Detailed Consumer Information
- Routes of administration: Intramuscular, intravenous
- ATC code: J06AA01 (WHO)

Identifiers
- ChemSpider: none

Diphtheria antitoxin (DAT) is a medication made up of antibodies used in the treatment of diphtheria. It is no longer recommended for prevention of diphtheria. It is administered through injection into a vein or muscle.

Side effects are common. They include serum sickness and allergic reactions including anaphylaxis. Diphtheria antitoxin is made from the blood plasma of horses that have been immunized against diphtheria toxin. It works by neutralizing the toxins produced by Corynebacterium diphtheriae.

Diphtheria antitoxin was developed and came into medical use in the late 1800s. The 1901 diphtheria antitoxin contamination incident, in which the milk wagon horse used to culture the antitoxin became infected with tetanus, which contaminated vials of the antitoxin leading to the deaths of several children in the midwest United States, led to the passage of the Biologics Control Act of 1902 and the 1906 formation of the U.S. Food and Drug Administration (FDA). The celebrated 1925 serum run to Nome was a transport of the antitoxin by dog sled relay across the U.S. territory of Alaska across 674 miles (1,085 km) in 5 1/2 days, saving the small town of Nome and the surrounding communities from an epidemic of the disease.

Diphtheria antitoxin is on the World Health Organization's List of Essential Medicines. In the United States it can be obtained from the Centers for Disease Control. It is not available in many countries including many in Europe as of 2008.

== Chemistry ==
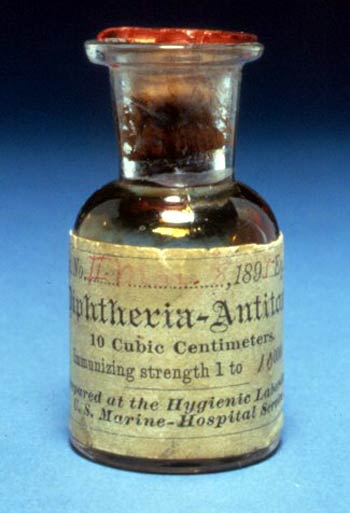
One of the first bottles of Diphtheria antitoxin produced by the Hygienic Laboratory (predecessor of the NIH), c. 1895

It is a solution of concentrated proteins, chiefly globulins, containing antibodies obtained from the blood of horses that have been immunized against diphtheria toxin.
