= Peter Marks (physician) =

American hematologist oncologist

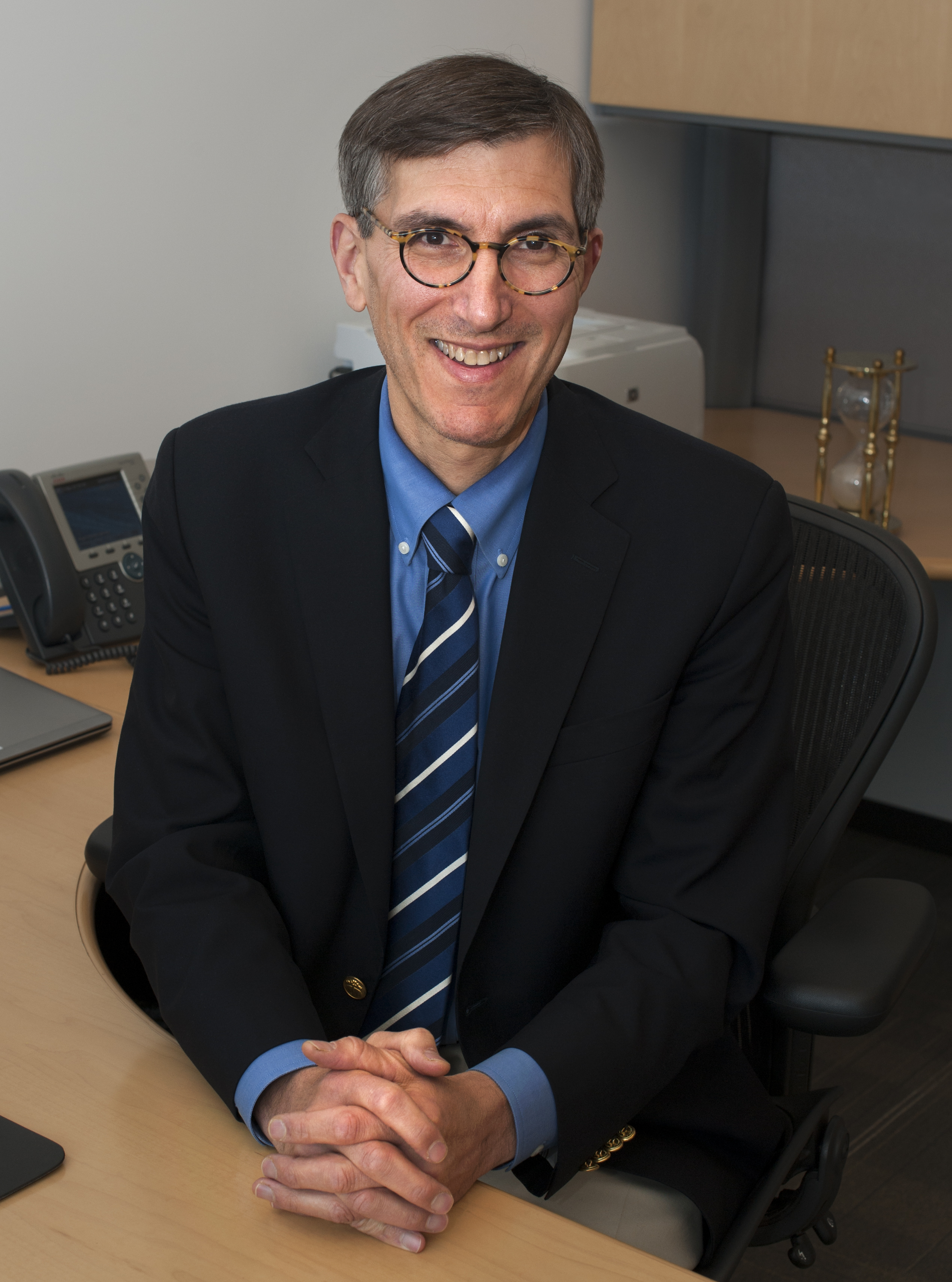
- Born: November 5, 1963 (age 62); Brooklyn, New York, U.S.
- Education: Columbia University (BS); New York University (MD, PhD)
- Occupation: Business executive
- Employer: Eli Lilly (2025–present)
- Known for: FDA Director of the Center for Biologics Evaluation and Research
- Title: Head of infectious disease and senior vice president of molecule discovery
- Scientific career
- Fields: Hematology, Oncology
- Institutions: Brigham and Women's Hospital; Yale University
- Doctoral advisor: Frederick R. Maxfield

Peter Marks is an American hematologist and oncologist who currently serves as the head of infectious disease and senior vice president of molecule discovery at Eli Lilly. He previously served as the director of the Center for Biologics Evaluation and Research within the Food and Drug Administration, having been appointed to the position in 2016 after previously serving as deputy director. Among other duties, Marks oversaw the FDA vaccine program. In March 2025, Marks resigned from his position.

== Education ==
Marks earned a Bachelor of Science degree from Columbia University, followed by a Doctor of Medicine and PhD in cell and molecular biology from New York University in the lab of Fredrick R. Maxfield. As an undergraduate, he volunteered at Mount Sinai St. Luke's in New York City, where he worked in the radioimmunoassay lab. He completed an internal medicine residency and oncology training at the Brigham and Women's Hospital.

== Career ==
After completing his training, Marks worked at the Brigham and Women's Hospital as a clinician-scientist, and later served as Clinical Director of Hematology. He then worked in the pharmaceutical industry, where he worked on the development of hematology and oncology products. He later managed the Adult Leukemia Service at Yale University and served as the Chief Clinical Officer of the Yale New Haven Hospital Cancer Center. Marks joined the FDA's Center for Biologics Evaluation and Research as deputy director in 2012, and was promoted to director in 2016.

In May 2020, he was selected to serve as a member of the White House Coronavirus Task Force, although he left a few days later over concerns that his participation would represent a conflict with his position at FDA. Marks also played a role in establishing Operation Warp Speed, a partnership between the federal government and various private companies to develop a COVID-19 vaccine, but left the project in May 2020 shortly after it was launched. Marks believed he would be more useful in his role as chief regulator of vaccines as the Director of FDA's Center for Biologics Evaluation and Research.

In 2021, Marks served as a plenary speaker at the State of the National Hemophilia Foundation's Science Research Summit. In 2024, Marks overruled FDA staff to approve gene pharmacotherapy Elevidys—intended to treat Duchenne muscular dystrophy—despite it failing in Phase III clinical trial.

On March 28, 2025, US Secretary of Health and Human Services, Robert F. Kennedy, Jr., informed Marks that he should resign or be fired. Marks wrote a resignation letter that lamented Kennedy's attempts to erode trust in vaccines: “However, it has become clear that truth and transparency are not desired by the Secretary, but rather he wishes subservient confirmation of his misinformation and lies.”

In October 2025, Marks was appointed as the head of infectious disease and senior vice president of molecule discovery at Eli Lilly.

== Personal life ==
Marks has two children and resides in Washington, D.C., with his wife.
