= Arthur H. Hayes Jr. =

American pharmacologist

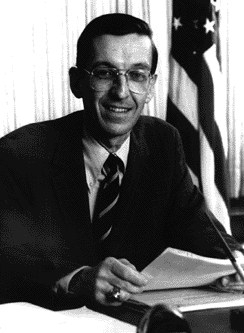

14th Commissioner of Food and Drugs
- In office April 13, 1981 – September 11, 1983
- President: Ronald Reagan
- Preceded by: Jere E. Goyan
- Succeeded by: Frank Edward Young

Personal details
- Born: July 18, 1933 Highland Park, Michigan
- Died: February 11, 2010 (aged 76) Danbury, Connecticut
- Party: Republican

Arthur Hull Hayes Jr. (July 18, 1933 – February 11, 2010) was an American pharmacologist, medical educator and administrator who served as Commissioner of the Food and Drug Administration (FDA) from 1981 to 1983.

== Early life ==
Hayes was the son of Arthur Hayes Sr. and Florence Gruber Hayes. He has two sisters and one brother. His father was the president of CBS Radio.

== Education ==
Arthur was a graduate of Immaculate Heart of Mary Catholic Elementary School, graduating in 1947. Around 1955, at the age of 21, Arthur received a bachelor's degree in philosophy from Santa Clara University. After turning 23, he traveled to Oxford as a Rhodes Scholar where he earned a degree in philosophy, politics, and economics. He earned his medical degree from Cornell University Medical School in 1964.

== Career ==
Following his internship, residency, and a two-year term services in the Army Medical Corps, he became an assistant professor of medicine and pharmacology at Cornell in 1968, and became a director of clinical pharmacology at the Pennsylvania State University Medical School in 1972.

On July 18, 1981, Hayes was appointed Commissioner of the FDA by Ronald Reagan. Three months later he controversially overturned an FDA review board and approved the use of aspartame in dry foods. He also shelved a ban under consideration on nitrates in meat, which increase the risk of developing cancer.

The Chicago Tylenol murders in 1982, caused nationwide alarm after seven people died after taking Extra-Strength Tylenol capsules which had been laced with potassium cyanide. Under Hayes' leadership, the government and the drug industry responded by developing the first federal regulations requiring tamper-evident packaging for all over-the-counter drugs.

Hayes allowed a potentially hazardous infant formula to be marketed and approved the anti-arthritis drug Oraflex, only to learn of reports that the drug caused deaths and adverse reactions.

He was finally investigated for accepting free lodging and travel from industry trade groups, double billing, and questionable reimbursements for private speaking engagements.

He resigned on September 11, 1983, to become dean and provost of New York Medical College in Valhalla, N.Y. and was named president of EM Pharmaceuticals Inc.

== Death ==
Hayes died from leukemia on February 11, 2010, at the age of 76. He is survived by his wife, Barbara Anne Carey; a son, Arthur, two daughters, Lisa Hayes and Kathy Saracino; two sisters, Mary Ann Kelley and Florence Hayes; his brother, Joseph; and eight grandchildren.
