= Wisconsin's 86th Assembly district =

American legislative district for north-central Wisconsin

Wisconsin's 86th State Assembly district
- 2024 map defined in 2023 Wisc. Act 94; 2022 map defined in Johnson v. Wisconsin Elections Commission; 2011 map was defined in 2011 Wisc. Act 43
Assemblymember
| John Spiros; R–Marshfield |
since January 7, 2013 (13 years)
- Demographics: 94.36% White; 0.72% Black; 1.85% Hispanic; 1.47% Asian; 1.08% Native American; 0.09% Hawaiian/Pacific Islander
- Population (2020) • Voting age: 59,462; 46,226
- Website: Official website
- Notes: North-central Wisconsin

The 86th Assembly district of Wisconsin is one of 99 districts in the Wisconsin State Assembly. Located in north-central Wisconsin, the district comprises the northern half of Wood County and parts of central and southwest Marathon County and northwest Portage County. It includes the cities of Marshfield and Pittsville, and the villages of Arpin, Auburndale, Edgar, Fenwood, Hewitt, Junction City, Marathon City, Milladore, Rudolph, Spencer, Stratford, and Vesper. The district has been represented by Republican John Spiros since January 2013.

The 86th Assembly district is located within Wisconsin's 29th Senate district, along with the 85th and 87th Assembly districts.

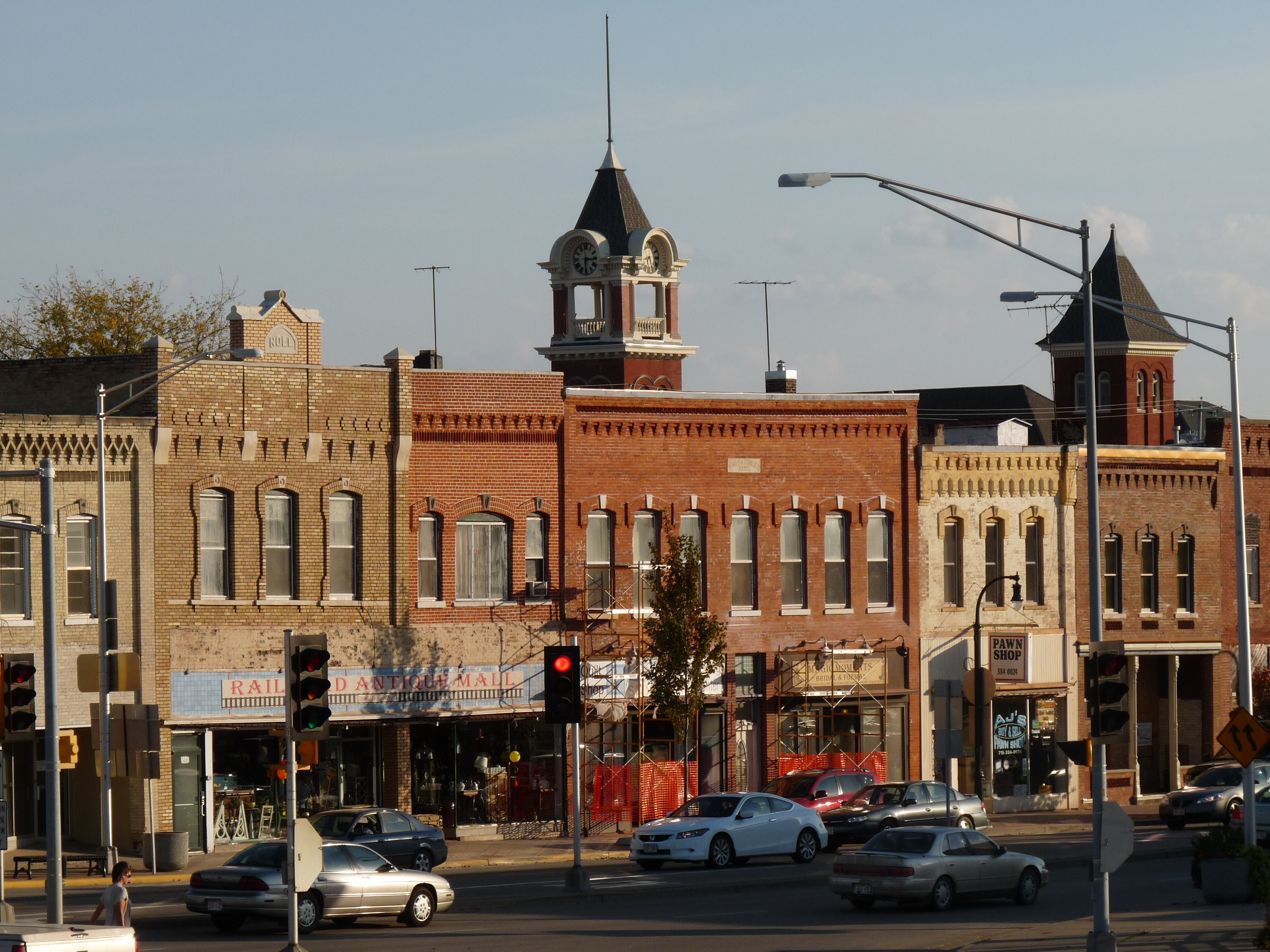
Marshfield Central Avenue Historic District

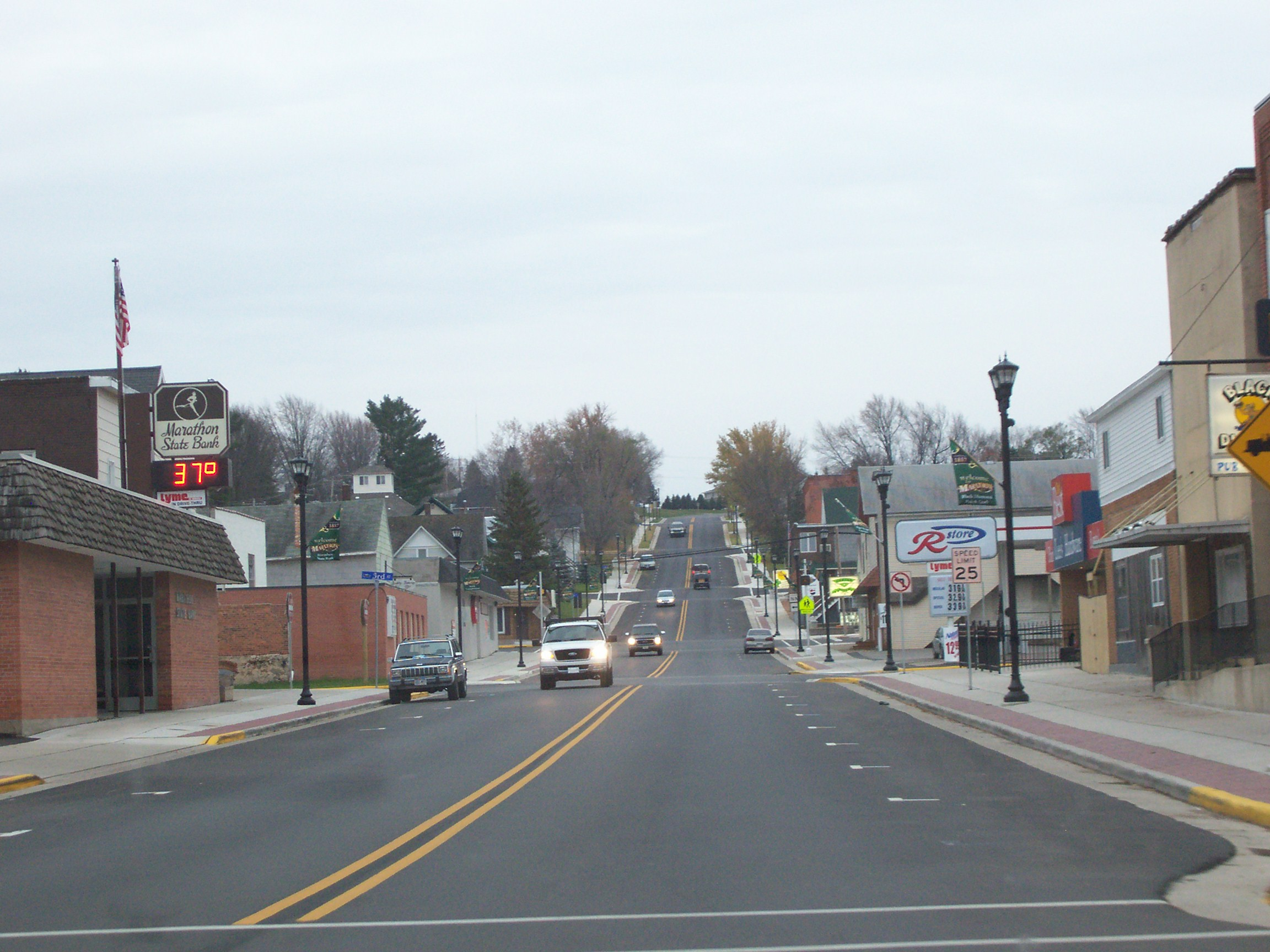
Downtown Marathon City

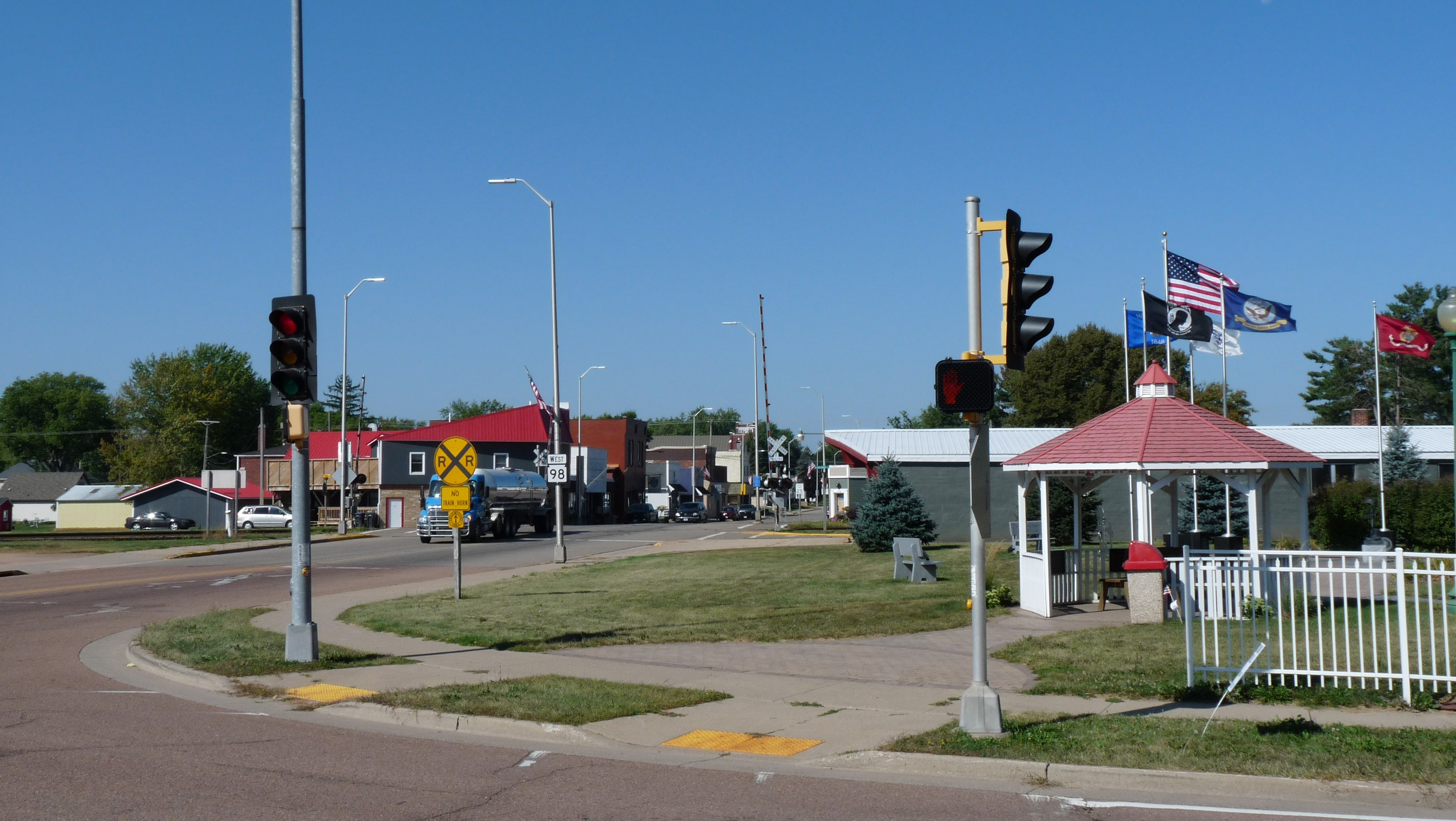
Spencer, Wisconsin

== List of past representatives ==
List of representatives to the Wisconsin State Assembly from the 86th district
| Member | Party | Residence | Counties represented | Term start | Term end | Ref. |
|---|---|---|---|---|---|---|
District created
| Laurence J. Day | Dem. | Eland | Marathon | January 1, 1973 | January 1, 1979 | |
| Raymond Omernick | Rep. | Wittenberg | Marathon | January 1, 1979 | January 5, 1981 | |
| John L. McEwen | Rep. | Schofield | Marathon | January 5, 1981 | January 3, 1983 | |
| Patricia A. Goodrich | Rep. | Berlin | Fond du Lac, Green Lake, Waushara | January 3, 1983 | January 7, 1985 | |
| William A. Kasten | Rep. | Mosinee | Marathon, Shawano, Waupaca | January 7, 1985 | January 5, 1987 | |
| Brad Zweck | Dem. | Mosinee | Marathon, Shawano, Waupaca | January 5, 1987 | September 16, 1991 | |
| --Vacant-- | | | Marathon, Shawano, Waupaca | September 16, 1991 | November 27, 1991 | |
| Thomas J. Springer | Dem. | Mosinee | Marathon | November 27, 1991 | January 3, 1999 | |
| Jerry Petrowski | Rep. | Marathon | Marathon, Portage, Shawano | January 3, 1999 | July 17, 2012 | |
| --Vacant-- | | | Marathon, Portage, Shawano | July 17, 2012 | January 7, 2013 | |
| John Spiros | Rep. | Marshfield | Marathon, Wood | January 7, 2013 | Current | |
