= Joseph Leean =

20th century American politician

Joe Leean

1st Secretary of the Wisconsin Department of Health and Family Services
- In office July 5, 1995 – March 10, 2001
- Governor: Tommy Thompson
- Preceded by: Richard Loring (acting); Gerald Whitburn
- Succeeded by: Phyllis Dube

Member of the Wisconsin Senate from the 14th district
- In office January 7, 1985 – July 5, 1995
- Preceded by: Gerald Lorge
- Succeeded by: Robert Welch

Personal details
- Born: March 10, 1942 Iola, Wisconsin, U.S.
- Died: February 2, 2022 (aged 79)
- Party: Republican
- Spouse: Virginia "Ginny" Leean
- Children: 3
- Education: Augustana College (B.A.)

Joseph S. "Joe" Leean (born March 10, 1942) is an American businessman and retired Republican politician. He served as Secretary of the Wisconsin Department of Health and Family Services for seven years under Governor Tommy Thompson and was instrumental in the creation of BadgerCare, Wisconsin's state health insurance program.

Leean subsequently worked as a consultant to Thompson after his appointment as United States Secretary of Health and Human Services. Earlier in his career, he served ten years in the Wisconsin State Senate, representing the 14th Senate district.

== Early life and career ==
Leean was born in Iola, Wisconsin. He earned his bachelor's degree from Augustana College in 1964 and went on to do graduate studies at the University of Wisconsin–Madison and Western Michigan University. He worked as a high school math and physics teacher for several years, then became owner and operator of a recreational boating company on the Chain O' Lakes outside Waupaca, Wisconsin.

== Political career ==
Leean was first elected to the Senate in 1984, representing the 14th District, and was re-elected in 1988 and 1992. Leean was appointed to the influential budget-writing Joint Finance Committee in 1989, and became co-chair of the powerful committee after Republicans secured the Senate majority in 1993.

He resigned from the Senate in July 1995 to accept an appointment as the head of the newly reorganized Department of Health and Family Services (now the Wisconsin Department of Health Services). He was succeeded in the 14th Senate district by Robert Welch after a September special election.

At the time of his appointment, Governor Thompson said Leean had demonstrated his "diplomacy, skill, and ability" as co-chair of the Joint Finance Committee—where he had to forge consensus with a Democratic co-chair Barbara Linton. Leean served seven years as head of the Department Health and Family Services under Thompson. In 2001, Thompson was appointed United States Secretary of Health and Human Services in the George W. Bush administration and Leean joined Thompson as a consultant in Washington, D.C.

Leean retired to Wisconsin after his stint with the Department of Health and Human Services. He remained active in state politics, however, and was an outspoken supporter of Wisconsin's medicaid program, BadgerCare, and worked with Democratic Governor Jim Doyle's administration to develop a bipartisan state health insurance plan.

== Personal life ==
Leean and his wife, Ginny, lived in Waupaca, Wisconsin. He is survived by three adult daughters.

== Electoral history ==
=== Wisconsin Senate (1984–1992) ===
Year	Election	Date	Elected				Defeated				Total	Plurality
1984	Primary	Sep. 11	Joseph Leean	Republican	6,948	38.35%	William D. Lorge	Rep.	6,741	37.21%	18,118	207
1984	Primary	Sep. 11	Joseph Leean	Republican	6,948	38.35%	Richard O. Wright	Rep.	4,000	22.07%	18,118	207
1984	Primary	Sep. 11	Joseph Leean	Republican	6,948	38.35%	Bernard Bult	Rep.	429	2.37%	18,118	207
1984	General	Nov. 6	Joseph Leean	Republican	41,654	69.27%	Raymond Huber	Dem.	18,482	30.73%	60,136	23,172
1988	Primary	Sep. 13	Joseph Leean (inc)	Republican	13,907	75.31%	Robert E. Matz	Rep.	4,560	24.69%	18,467	9,347
1988	General	Nov. 8	Joseph Leean (inc)	Republican	40,020	69.77%	Max W. Harrington	Dem.	17,337	30.23%	57,357	22,683
1992	Primary	Sep. 8	Joseph Leean (inc)	Republican	10,587	64.12%	Robert M. Sprenger	Rep.	5,924	35.88%	16,511	4,663
1992	General	Nov. 3	Joseph Leean (inc)	Republican	50,034	100.0%	--Unopposed--				50,034	N/A

Wisconsin Senate
Preceded by Gerald Lorge	Member of the Wisconsin Senate from the 14th district January 7, 1985 – July 5, 1995	Succeeded by Robert Welch
Government offices
Preceded by Richard Loring (acting); Gerald Whitburn (confirmed)	Secretary of the Wisconsin Department of Health and Family Services; July 5, 1995 – March 10, 2001	Succeeded by Phyllis Dube
