= Mark McClellan =

American health economist (born 1963)

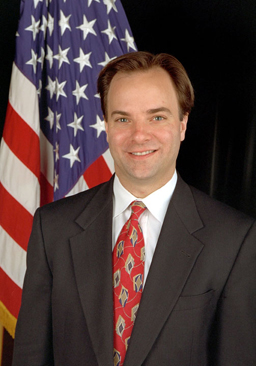

12th Administrator of the Centers for Medicare and Medicaid Services
- In office March 25, 2004 – October 14, 2006
- President: George W. Bush
- Preceded by: Dennis Smith (Acting)
- Succeeded by: Leslie Norwalk (Acting)

18th Commissioner of Food and Drugs
- In office November 14, 2002 – March 25, 2004
- President: George W. Bush
- Preceded by: Jane Henney
- Succeeded by: Lester Crawford

Personal details
- Born: June 26, 1963 (age 63) Austin, Texas, U.S.
- Parents: Barr McClellan (father); Carole Keeton Strayhorn (mother)
- Relatives: W. Page Keeton (grandfather)
- Education: University of Texas, Austin (BA); Harvard University (MPA, MD); Massachusetts Institute of Technology (PhD)

Mark Barr McClellan (born June 26, 1963) is the director of the Robert J Margolis Center for Health Policy and the Margolis Professor of Business, Medicine and Health Policy at Duke University. Formerly, he was a senior fellow and director of the Health Care Innovation and Value Initiative at the Engelberg Center for Health Care Reform at The Brookings Institution, in Washington, D.C. McClellan served as commissioner of the United States Food and Drug Administration under President George W. Bush from 2002 through 2004, and subsequently as administrator of the Centers for Medicare and Medicaid Services from 2004 through 2006.

== Education ==
After graduating from the University of Texas in 1985 majoring in English, Biology, and Plan II, he earned his M.D. degree from the Harvard–MIT Division of Health Sciences and Technology in 1992 and his Ph.D. in economics from MIT in 1993. He also earned a Master of Public Administration degree from Harvard Kennedy School in 1991. He completed his residency training in internal medicine at Brigham and Women's Hospital, and he is board-certified in internal medicine. McClellan's research studies have addressed measuring and improving the quality of health care, the economic and policy factors influencing medical treatment decisions and health outcomes, estimating the effects of medical treatments, technological change in health care and its consequences for health and medical expenditures, and the relationship between health and economic well-being. He has twice received the Arrow Award for Outstanding Research in Health Economics.

== Career ==
=== In government ===
From 1998 to 1999, McClellan served as deputy assistant secretary of the Treasury for Economic Policy, where he supervised economic analysis and policy development on a wide range of domestic policy issues.

During 2001 and 2002, McClellan served in the White House. He was a member of the president's Council of Economic Advisers, where he advised on domestic economic issues. He also served during this time as a senior policy director for health care and related economic issues for the White House.

McClellan served as commissioner for the Food and Drug Administration (FDA) beginning November 14, 2002, becoming the first economist to hold that position. Originally from Austin, Texas, he is the brother of former White House Press Secretary Scott McClellan and the son of Texas comptroller Carole Keeton Strayhorn and attorney Barr McClellan.

He was administrator for the Centers for Medicare and Medicaid Services in the United States Department of Health and Human Services from 2004 to 2006. In this position, he was responsible for administering the Medicare and Medicaid programs, including Medicare Part D, the prescription drug benefit program engendered by the Medicare Prescription Drug, Improvement, and Modernization Act.

Following the resignation of Health & Human Services Secretary Tommy Thompson in 2004, McClellan was mentioned as a possible replacement, but President Bush ultimately nominated former Utah governor Mike Leavitt. On September 5, 2006, McClellan announced his resignation from his post in the department. He told The Associated Press he would be leaving the agency in about five weeks and would probably work for a think tank where he could write about improving health care in the United States.

McClellan is the founding chair and senior advisor of the Reagan-Udall Foundation, a public-private partnership between the U.S. Food and Drug Administration and industry founded in 2007.

=== In academia ===
Previously, McClellan was associate professor of economics at Stanford University, associate professor of medicine at the Stanford University School of Medicine, a practicing internist, and director of the Program on Health Outcomes Research at Stanford University. He was also a research associate of the National Bureau of Economic Research and a visiting scholar at the American Enterprise Institute. Additionally, he was a member of the National Cancer Policy Board of the National Academy of Sciences, associate editor of the Journal of Health Economics, and co-principal investigator of the Health and Retirement Study (HRS), a longitudinal study of the health and economic well-being of older Americans.

=== Publications ===
==== Hospital Reimbursement Incentives: An Empirical Analysis ====
Published in 1997 in the Journal of Economics and Management Strategy, McClellan's paper serves as a review and analysis of provider payment incentives resulting from the Medicare prospective payment system (PPS). Implemented in the 1980s, PPS was intended to incentivize hospitals to drive down costs by limiting the use of costly technologies that added little benefit. The hallmark of the program is the use of fixed payments via diagnosis-related groups (DRGs) in a prospective manner based on diagnosis at the time of admission. McClellan suggests that PPS may not optimally incentivize cost sharing among insurers and health providers due to the income effect by which hospitals may seek out particular diagnoses with higher reimbursement rates, akin to skimming in the insurance arena. Conversely, retrospective cost sharing allows for possible supply induced demand, minimizing the hospital's incentive to decrease resource utilization and costs in more complicated cases.

This paper presents an econometric model to summarize these reimbursement incentives, present information on cost sharing and generosity in the PPS model, and discuss the implications of these findings. McClellan points out repeatedly that the PPS has increasingly permitted more retrospective adjustments to the payments. This has been primarily driven through outliers and treatment-driven DRG's developed during the admission, rather than diagnosis-driven DRG's identified at the time of admission. Outlier payments allow for supplemental payments for unusually lengthy or expensive admissions and make up no more than 5% of all hospital admissions. The author considers the increase in case mix index, a measure of the intensity of care delivered, to have the most important influence on overall PPS payments. He adds that these retrospective adjustments may be hampering the program's effectiveness in implementing cost sharing. McClellan's model allows individual aspects of PPS to be evaluated for their contribution to cost sharing rates and reimbursement variance. He used linear regression to approximate how the cost sharing reimbursement is derived, using fixed and variable components. Lower costs equaled lower reimbursement; however, higher costs led to higher reimbursements only if the costs were driven by a procedure. This was most true for men aged 65 to 69 with surgery requiring ICU care and an increased length of stay. Generosity estimates indicate that virtually all hospitals do some cost sharing. Higher generosity is usually associated with greater retrospective limits on cost sharing. In the 1990s, high-tech hospitals saw more generous reimbursements and were more likely to survive, whereas for-profit hospitals were more likely to exit the market.

In summary, the Medicare "Prospective" Payment System has multiple retrospective factors that limited cost sharing in 1990. McClellan's review serves as a harbinger of current attempts to model a health care reimbursement program focused on pay for performance criteria such as penalties for readmissions and incentives for value-based purchasing. The Patient Protection and Affordable Care Act continues to drive home the message of cost sharing by reducing reimbursements in the Inpatient Prospective Payment System.

== Role in Center for Reproductive Rights lawsuit ==
During McClellan's tenure as Commissioner of the Food and Drug Administration (FDA), the makers of Plan B emergency contraception applied for over-the-counter status.

In May 2004, FDA commissioner Steven Galson rejected over-the-counter status for Plan B. The Center for Reproductive Rights then filed a lawsuit, and deposed Dr John Jenkins, director of the FDA's Office of New Drugs. Jenkins alleges that he learned in early 2004 that McClellan, then Commissioner of the FDA, had decided against approval even before the staff could complete their analysis. "I think many of us were very concerned that there were policy or political issues that came to play in the decision," Jenkins stated. He later said he did not know if anyone outside FDA influenced the decision.

McClellan said in his deposition that he was not involved in the decision to reject the initial Plan B application for non-prescription sales; he left the FDA in February 2004 to head the agency that runs Medicare and Medicaid. He also said that he was never told by anyone higher up in the Bush administration what to do about the application, although he did say that he "briefed" two White House domestic-policy advisors. The litigation is ongoing; no finding has been made for either side.

== Selected publications ==
- McClellan M, McNeil BJ, Newhouse JP (1994). "Does more intensive treatment of acute myocardial infarction in the elderly reduce mortality? Analysis using instrumental variables". JAMA. 272 (11): 859–66. doi:10.1001/jama.1994.03520110039026. PMID 8078163.
- Kessler D, McClellan M (1996). "Do doctors practice defensive medicine?" (PDF). The Quarterly Journal of Economics. 111 (2): 353–390. doi:10.2307/2946682. JSTOR 2946682. S2CID 153535430.
- Newhouse JP, McClellan M (1998). "Econometrics in outcomes research: the use of instrumental variables". Annual Review of Public Health. 19: 17–34. doi:10.1146/annurev.publhealth.19.1.17. PMID 9611610.
- Kessler DP, McClellan MB (2000). "Is hospital competition socially wasteful?*" (PDF). The Quarterly Journal of Economics. 115 (2): 577–615. doi:10.1162/003355300554863.
- Cutler DM, McClellan M, Newhouse JP (2000). "How does managed care do it?" (PDF). The RAND Journal of Economics. 31 (3): 526–48. JSTOR 2600999. PMID 11503704. Archived from the original (PDF) on 2011-04-17.
- Cutler DM, McClellan M (2001). "Is technological change in medicine worth it?". Health Affairs. 20 (5): 11–29. doi:10.1377/hlthaff.20.5.11. PMID 11558696.
- Dranove D, Kessler D, McClellan M, Satterthwaite M (2003). "Is more information better? The effects of "report cards" on health care providers" (PDF). Journal of Political Economy. 111 (3): 555–588. doi:10.1086/374180.
- Fisher ES, McClellan MB, Bertko J, Lieberman SM, Lee JJ, Lewis JL, Skinner JS (2009). "Fostering accountable health care: moving forward in Medicare". Health Affairs. 28 (2): w219–31. doi:10.1377/hlthaff.28.2.w219. PMC 2656392. PMID 19174383.
- McClellan M, McKethan AN, Lewis JL, Roski J, Fisher ES (2010). "A national strategy to put accountable care into practice" (PDF). Health Affairs. 29 (5): 982–990. doi:10.1377/hlthaff.2010.0194. PMID 20439895. Archived from the original (PDF) on 2011-07-19.
- McClellan M, Benner J, Schilsky R, Epstein D, Woosley R, Friend S, Sidransky D, Geoghegan C, Kessler D (2011). "An accelerated pathway for targeted cancer therapies". Nature Reviews Drug Discovery. 10 (2): 79–80. doi:10.1038/nrd3360. PMID 21283090. S2CID 5315079.

Political offices
| Preceded by Jane Henney | Commissioner of Food and Drugs; 2002–2004 | Succeeded by Lester Crawford |
| Preceded by Dennis Smith; Acting | Administrator of the Centers for Medicare and Medicaid Services; 2004–2006 | Succeeded by Leslie Norwalk; Acting |
