= Eloise Anderson =

American politician and social worker

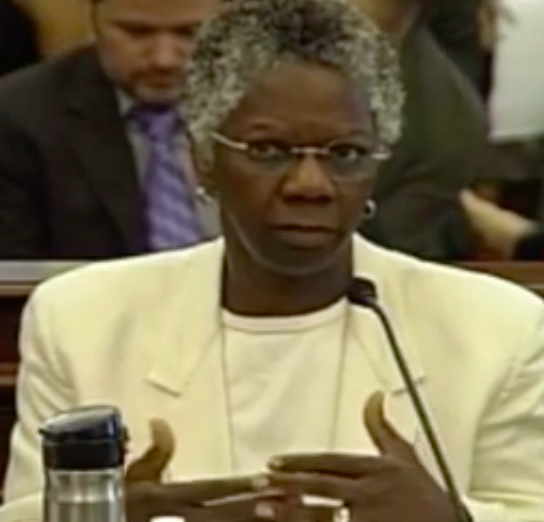

2nd Secretary of the Wisconsin Department of Children and Families
- In office January 11, 2011 – January 7, 2019
- Governor: Scott Walker
- Preceded by: Reginald Bicha
- Succeeded by: Emilie Amundson

Director of the California Department of Social Services
- In office 1992–1998
- Governor: Pete Wilson
- Succeeded by: Rita Saenz

Personal details
- Born: February 7, 1942 (age 84)
- Party: Republican
- Education: University of Toledo; University of Wisconsin–Milwaukee

Military service
- Allegiance: United States
- Branch/service: United States Army
- Years of service: 1972-1977

Eloise Anderson is an American politician and social worker who served as the Wisconsin Secretary of Children and Families from 2011 until 2019. Anderson has been an influential voice opposed to conventional welfare programs in the United States. Radio host Charlie Sykes has referred to Anderson as a "Conservative Warrior in Fight Against Poverty."

== Biography ==
=== Career ===
Anderson worked as a social worker in Milwaukee, Wisconsin before joining state government. Anderson served as Administrator of the Division of Community Services at the Wisconsin Department of Health and Social Services from 1988-1992, where she helped to develop the W-2 program. She then served as director of the California Department of Social Services. During her time in California, the Los Angeles Times referred to Anderson as "The Queen of Responsibility" and "an outspoken champion of welfare reform." Anderson spoke at the Republican National Convention in 1996, endorsing Bob Dole for President of the United States. In her speech, she stated "Welfare is a tragedy. It has outlived its usefulness. It runs men out of families, leaving children without fathers. We have lost our sense of duty to marriage." During her time in California, the Los Angeles Times referred to Anderson as “The Queen of Responsibility” and “an outspoken champion of welfare reform. In 1999, Anderson was featured in George Will's book, The Woven Figure: Conservatism and America's Fabric, where she referred to the welfare system as "the plantation." Anderson has called for the total abolishment of welfare in the United States.

Anderson served on the Diocese of Sacramento School Board and the National Poverty Center's National Advisory Board. In October 2006, Governor of California Arnold Schwarzenegger appointed Anderson to the Little Hoover Commission. She served on the commission until 2010. Anderson has held a number of private-sector positions including President of Job Wave America, Director of the Project for the American Family at the Claremont Institute, and as President of Anderson Resource Management Services. Anderson was named by the leadership of the U.S. House of Representatives to the National Advisory Board on Welfare Indicators and was honored with the 1996 National Governors Association award for outstanding state official. Anderson has been a featured speaker and panelist for conservative think tanks including the American Enterprise Institute and The Heritage Foundation.

=== Secretary of Children and Families ===
Upon her appointment as Secretary of Children and Families in 2011, Anderson pledged to "weed out fraud" in the state's child care subsidy and other programs. As secretary, she served as a member of the cabinet of Governor of Wisconsin Scott Walker. Anderson has been called an "important proponent of welfare reform" in the United States.

Anderson was criticized for hiring Walker ally Cindy Archer to the position as legislative liaison at the Department of Children and Families at a salary of 65% more than what the last person to hold the position made. Anderson was also criticized for not interviewing Archer before offering her the nearly $100,000-a-year role. A few weeks after receiving the position, Archer's house was raised and searched by the FBI as part of a secret John Doe investigation of current and former Walker aides.

In April 2015, Anderson testified before the U.S. House of Representatives Ways and Means Subcommittee on Human Resources. Secretary Anderson has also testified to the House Budget Committee. During the same month, Anderson was criticized for the extensive backlog of 2,800 child abuse and neglect cases within the Department of Children and families, as well as reports of high staff turnover of two resignations per month.

In 2015, Anderson announced that the Department of Children and Families would not provide any benefits or services to any new refugees of the Syrian Civil War should they be placed in Wisconsin. In May 2016, Anderson delivered the commencement address at Cardinal Stritch University. Anderson penned a 2016 Op-Ed which stated, in part, "Studies show that the positive influences of family and marriage, and the structure of a stable home environment set the groundwork for children’s future success. Having a loving home with a mother and father who provide for their needs is a cornerstone to enhance family values.

In 2017, Anderson was publicly criticized by law enforcement leaders in Cook County, Illinois for alleged agency negligence and mishandling in a case involving a runaway 17-year-old girl.

During her time leading the Department of Children and Families, Anderson chaired the Secretaries' Innovation Group, a membership organization of conservative state human service and workforce secretaries advocating for "national solutions which favor healthy families, work, economic self-reliance, budget responsibility and limited government."

== Personal life ==
Secretary Anderson is married to Pat LeMahieu. She has adopted children and served as a foster parent.

Government offices
Preceded by Reginald Bicha	Secretary of the Wisconsin Department of Children and Families; 2011–2019	Succeeded by Emilie Amundson
