= Jasmine Zapata =

American physician and epidemiologist

Chief medical officer and state epidemiologist for community health, Wisconsin Department of Health Services
- Incumbent
- Assumed office May 2021

Personal details
- Born: Milwaukee, Wisconsin
- Education: University of Wisconsin School of Medicine and Public Health
- Profession: Physician and epidemiologist
- Website: www.drjasminezapata.com

Jasmine Y. Zapata is an American physician and epidemiologist. She is the chief medical officer and state epidemiologist for community health at Wisconsin Department of Health Services. Her career includes work as a pediatrician, public health researcher, assistant professor at the University of Wisconsin, author, and her support for youth empowerment with a variety of initiatives.

== Early life and education ==
Zapata was raised in the 53224 zip code in Milwaukee, Wisconsin, and before high school, lived in a house near N. 90th Street and W. Good Hope Road before her parents divorced. After her parents divorced, she moved into an apartment with her mother, Julia Battle, and younger brother Aaron, and they received public benefits, including BadgerCare, the public health insurance in Wisconsin. Zapata was the valedectorian at her high school graduation, and received a Burke Scholarship from Marquette University to attend the Marquette University College of Health Sciences. She married her husband, Miguel Zapata, in 2006. In 2007, Aaron died at age 16 from epilepsy.

Zapata completed her bachelor's degree in health sciences from Marquette University in 2009. She then accepted an Advanced Opportunity Fellowship to attend the University of Wisconsin School of Medicine and Public Health. In 2010, during her second year of medical school, she experienced the premature birth of her daughter, who was born at 25 weeks and survived. Her daughter spent three months in the neonatal intensive care unit, and the experience inspired Zapata to focus her career on the health of Black women and infants, as well as disparities in the health care system. Zapata earned her medical degree in 2013 and her master of public health degree in 2017 from the University of Wisconsin School of Medicine and Public Health. She completed her residency at the University of Wisconsin Hospital and Clinics.

== Career ==
Zapata has worked as a UW Health University Hospital pediatrician and newborn hospitalist at UnityPoint Health-Meriter, and as an assistant professor in the Neonatology and Newborn Nursery division at the University of Wisconsin Department of Pediatrics. Her research focuses on racial inequities and disparities in health care, and has included conducting interviews with Black women about their experiences with the health care system to help improve health care services related to pregnancy and infant care. She also worked with Harambee Village Doulas and the African American Breastfeeding Alliance to create a program to support pregnant people and infants.

In 2018, Zapata was selected for the University of Wisconsin School of Medicine and Public Health Centennial Scholar program, which granted her three years of 50 percent protected time to focus on public health research. In 2019, she was awarded a two-year New Investigator Grant from the Partnership Education and Research Committee (PERC) of the Wisconsin Partnership Program, for a project titled "Addressing Black Infant Mortality in Wisconsin through a Collaborative Health Equity Approach to Community-Based, Group Prenatal Care and Infant Support."

During the COVID-19 pandemic, she has conducted outreach to address COVID-19 vaccine hesitancy with local community groups and individuals. In 2020, she served as the advisor to University of Wisconsin School of Medicine and Public Health students, who invited health care workers to a White Coats for Black Lives rally in June 2020, where she marched with her daughter and spoke to the crowd about racism and implicit bias.

In September 2020, Zapata was appointed to the Governor's Health Equity Council by Wisconsin Governor Tony Evers. In May 2021, she was named chief medical officer and state epidemiologist for community health at the Wisconsin Department of Health Services.

== Youth empowerment ==
Zapata is the founder of Beyond Beautiful International, an international mentoring program for girls that offers workshops, coaching, books, and video series. In 2018, she toured seven cities in the Midwest on the Girls Empowerment Tour, a series of conferences with social workers, authors, youth counselors, ministers, and musicians, and was a speaker at the Black Girl Magic Conference in Madison, Wisconsin. At youth conferences, she performs a poem she wrote that became the basis for her book, Beyond Beautiful: A Girl's Guide to Unlocking the Power of Inner Beauty, Self Esteem, Resilience, and Courage, and asks her audience to participate by chanting lines that include, "I'm courageous, I'm resilient, I'm confident, I'm creative". The book has been adapted into a student workbook and translated into Swahili.

Zapata has served as the faculty director for the local branch of The Ladder, a national mentoring program supported by the University of Wisconsin School of Medicine and Public Health and the Boys and Girls Club of Dane County. She is also the co-founder and has served as the director of the Madison Inspirational Youth Choir. She also founded the Madam Dreamers Academy, an online mentoring program designed to support young women pursuing medical careers.

== Awards and recognition ==
- 2018 ATHENA Young Professional Award, The Business Forum
- 2019-20 Outstanding Women of Color Honoree, University of Wisconsin–Madison
- 2020 Wisconsin Medical Society Foundation's Superhero of Medicine Award
- 2021 Marquette University Young Alumna of The Year Award
- 2021 parade marshal at the Juneteenth celebration in Madison, Wisconsin

== Works ==
- Zapata, Jasmine; Co-authors (2016). She Conquered. Jasmine Zapata. ISBN 978-0998053011.
- Zapata, Jasmine (2017). Beyond Beautiful: A Girl's Guide to Unlocking the Power of Inner Beauty, Self Esteem, Resilience, and Courage. Motivational M.D. Enterprises, LLC. ISBN 9780998053028.

== Personal life ==
Zapata has three children with her husband Miguel. Around Thanksgiving 2020, Zapata, her mother, husband, and one of her three children tested positive for COVID-19. Following their recovery, Zapata and her husband donated convalescent plasma. Her great aunt died from COVID-19. Zapata and her mother were vaccinated together in March 2021.
