= Emilie Amundson =

21st century American educator

3rd Secretary of the Wisconsin Department of Children and Families
- In office January 7, 2019 – September 11, 2024
- Governor: Tony Evers
- Preceded by: Eloise Anderson
- Succeeded by: Jeff Pertl

Personal details
- Born: 1980 (age 45–46) Madison, Wisconsin, U.S.
- Spouse: Aaron Steffes
- Children: 2
- Education: University of Wisconsin–Madison; Harvard Graduate School of Education (M.Ed.)

Emilie A. Amundson (born 1980) is an American educator and government administrator. She served as secretary of the Wisconsin Department of Children and Families in the cabinet of Governor Tony Evers, from 2019 through 2024. She previously served as Evers' chief of staff when he was the state's Superintendent of Public Instruction.

== Biography ==
Amundson was born in Madison, Wisconsin, and received her undergraduate degree from the University of Wisconsin–Madison. She went on to earn her master's in education policy at Harvard Graduate School of Education. She began her career as an ESL teacher in Brooklyn, New York, and was a co-founder of the Urban Assembly School for Law and Justice (a law-themed high school). She subsequently moved back to Wisconsin, settling in Middleton, and worked as an English teacher in the Middleton-Cross Plains School District. She was also active with the bilingual education program at Edgewood College.

In 2002, Amundson went to work as an English language arts consultant at the Wisconsin Department of Public Instruction. Later, she became assistant director of the content and learning team, and then director of literacy and mathematics under the division for academic excellence. Finally, she was selected as chief of staff to Superintendent Tony Evers.

After Evers was elected Governor of Wisconsin in 2018, he named Amundson as his pick for Secretary of the Wisconsin Department of Children and Families. At the time of her selection, she was pursuing her Ph.D. in literacy studies. Many of Evers' cabinet appointees never received a vote of approval or disapproval in the Wisconsin State Senate and served in an acting capacity. Amundson did not receive an official vote until February 2020, when her nomination was confirmed by a vote of 32-to-1.

Amundson resigned from her role as secretary of the Department of Children and Families in September 2024.

== Personal life ==
Amundson and her husband live in Madison, Wisconsin, with their two young children. Her husband is a teacher in the Madison Metropolitan School District.

Amundson has also served on the Boards of Wisconsin Literacy, Cooperative Children's Book Center, Wisconsin Council of Teachers of English, and the Assembly of State Consultants of English Language Arts.

Government offices
Preceded by Eloise Anderson	Secretary of the Wisconsin Department of Children and Families; January 7, 2019 – September 11, 2024	Succeeded by Jeff Pertl
