= Patricia A. Goodrich =

American politician (1933–1999)

Secretary of the Wisconsin Department of Health and Social Services
- In office September 2, 1988 – February 7, 1991
- Appointed by: Tommy G. Thompson
- Preceded by: Timothy Cullen
- Succeeded by: Gerald Whitburn

Member of the Wisconsin State Assembly
- In office January 3, 1983 – January 7, 1985
- Preceded by: John L. McEwen
- Succeeded by: William A. Kasten
- Constituency: 86th district
- In office January 6, 1975 – January 3, 1983
- Preceded by: Jon P. Wilcox
- Succeeded by: Mary Panzer
- Constituency: 72nd district

Personal details
- Born: January 13, 1933 Jefferson City, Missouri, U.S.
- Died: March 31, 1999 (aged 66) Gold Canyon, Arizona
- Resting place: Oakwood Cemetery; Berlin, Wisconsin
- Party: Republican
- Spouse: Philo "Bud" Goodrich
- Children: Phil; Jim; John
- Education: Jefferson City Junior College; Park College

Patricia A. Goodrich (January 13, 1933 – March 31, 1999) was an American politician and homemaker. She served as secretary of the Wisconsin Department of Health and Social Services in the cabinet of Governor Tommy Thompson, and earlier served ten years in the Wisconsin State Assembly.

== Biography ==
Born in Jefferson City, Missouri, Goodrich was educated at Jefferson City Junior College and Park College. Goodrich moved to Berlin, Wisconsin.

She served in the Wisconsin State Assembly for five terms, from 1975 to 1985, as a Republican, representing Green Lake and Waushara counties. During her years in the Assembly she served alongside Tommy Thompson, who represented the neighboring district.

When Tommy Thompson later became Governor, he appointed Goodrich as Deputy Secretary of the Wisconsin Department of Health and Social Services. She would become Acting Secretary when her predecessor, Timothy Cullen, left office in 1988. Thompson later appointed her as Cullen's permanent replacement. Her appointment was controversial with some anti-abortion activists in Thompson's Republican base, due to her outspoken pro-choice record. She was confirmed and ultimately served in the role from mid 1988 through early 1991.

Goodrich died in Gold Canyon, Arizona. She was survived by her husband, Bud, and her three sons, Phil, Jim, and John.

== Notes ==
Wisconsin State Assembly
Preceded by Jon P. Wilcox	Member of the Wisconsin State Assembly from the 72nd district January 6, 1975–January 3, 1983	Succeeded by Mary Panzer
Preceded by John L. McEwen	Member of the Wisconsin State Assembly from the 86th district January 3, 1983–January 7, 1985	Succeeded by William A. Kasten
Government offices
Preceded by Timothy Cullen	Secretary of the Wisconsin Department of Health and Social Services; September 2, 1988 – February 7, 1991	Succeeded by Gerald Whitburn
