= Jane E. Henney =

American physician (born 1947)

Jane Henney
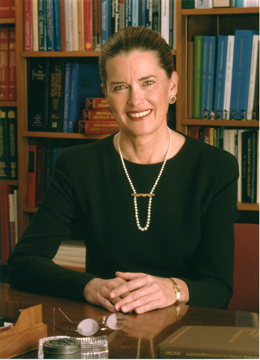

17th Commissioner of Food and Drugs
- In office January 17, 1999 – January 19, 2001
- President: Bill Clinton
- Preceded by: David A. Kessler
- Succeeded by: Mark McClellan

Personal details
- Born: 1947 (age 78–79) Woodburn, Indiana, U.S.
- Education: Manchester University (B.A.); Indiana University School of Medicine (M.D.); University of Texas MD Anderson Cancer Center

Jane Ellen Henney (born 1947) is an American physician who was the first woman to serve as commissioner of the U.S. Food and Drug Administration. Appointed by President Bill Clinton, she served at the FDA from 1999 to 2001.

== Education and career ==
Jane Henney was born in Woodburn, Indiana. She received her undergraduate training at Manchester University, an MD degree from Indiana University School of Medicine and did postgraduate work at the University of Texas MD Anderson Cancer Center in Houston. Trained as a medical oncologist, she joined the National Cancer Institute at the National Institutes of Health in 1976, working in the Cancer Therapy and Evaluation Program.

Prior to her appointment as commissioner, Henney had worked at the FDA from 1992 to 1994 as deputy commissioner for operations under then-commissioner David Aaron Kessler, and then at the University of New Mexico, where she was vice president of the health sciences center. After leaving the FDA she joined the board of directors of the pharmaceutical company AstraZeneca.

A significant and far reaching decision by the FDA under her tenure, was the ban on supplements and natural products that contain lovastatin, effectively handing exclusivity of cholesterol lowering compounds to pharmaceutical companies. AstraZeneca benefited directly from this decision this removed a cheap, natural product, from competing with their own statin rosuvastatin.

She was named senior vice president and provost for health affairs at the University of Cincinnati in 2003. In 2012, she was appointed to the Board of Directors of Cubist Pharmaceuticals.
