= Robert Welch (Wisconsin politician) =

American politician

Bob Welch
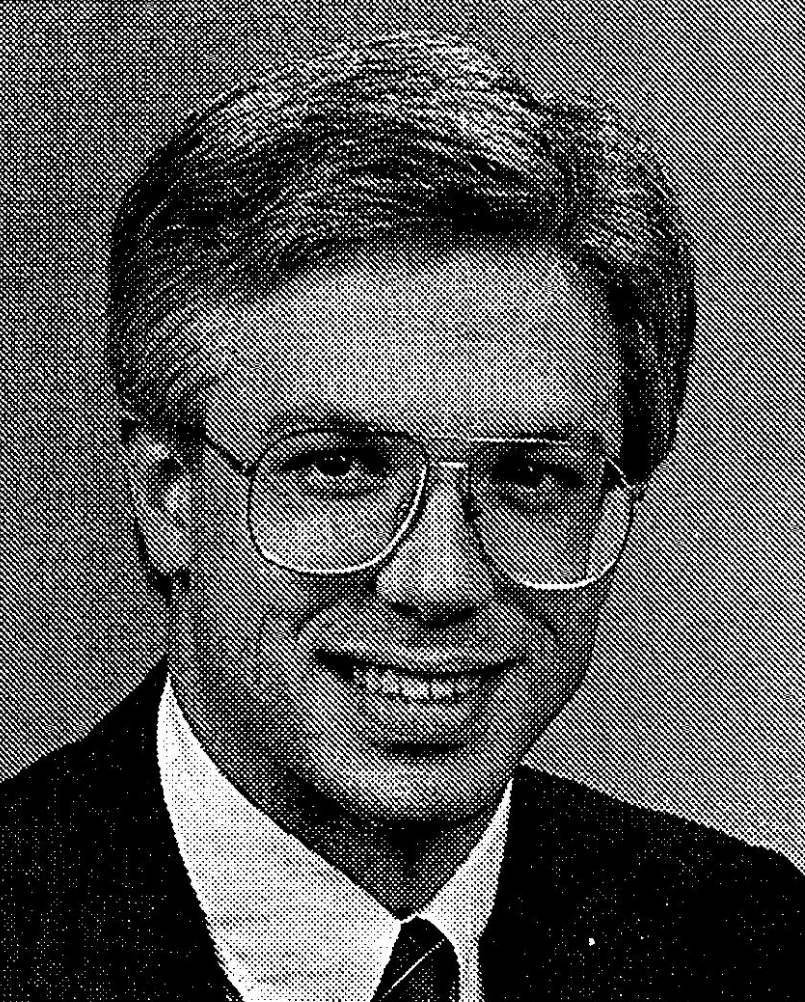
- Welch, circa 1992

Member of the Wisconsin Senate from the 14th district
- In office September 20, 1995 – January 3, 2005
- Preceded by: Joseph Leean
- Succeeded by: Luther Olsen

Member of the Wisconsin State Assembly from the 41st district
- In office January 7, 1985 – January 2, 1995
- Preceded by: Richard Shoemaker
- Succeeded by: Luther Olsen

Personal details
- Born: June 8, 1958 (age 68) Berlin, Wisconsin, U.S.
- Party: Republican
- Spouse: Jeanne
- Education: Ripon College (B.A.); Madison Area Technical College (A.A.S.)
- Website: Company website

Robert T. Welch (born June 8, 1958) is an American lobbyist and former Republican politician. He served 10 years in the Wisconsin State Senate and 10 years in the State Assembly, and was an unsuccessful candidate for United States Senate in 1994 and 2004.

== Biography ==
Born in Berlin, Wisconsin, Welch graduated from Ripon College and went to Madison Area Technical College, where he was trained to be a surveyor. He served in the Wisconsin State Assembly from 1985 to 1995. Rather than run for re-election in 1994, he chose to run for United States Senate and was defeated by Herb Kohl.

Shortly after the 1994 election, incumbent state senator Joseph Leean announced he would resign to accept an appointment from the Governor. Welch won the 1995 special election to fill the remainder of his term. He was subsequently elected to a full term in 1996 and 2000. In 2004, he again deferred re-election for an attempt at election to the United States Senate, but came in a distant 3rd in the Republican primary. He left office in January 2005.

After leaving office, Welch formed a lobbying firm, Welch Group Public Affairs, with his wife, Jeanne. Their son, Peter, took over the firm in 2025.

Party political offices
Preceded by Susan Engeleiter	Republican nominee for U.S. Senator from Wisconsin (Class 1); 1994	Succeeded by John Gillespie
Wisconsin State Assembly
Preceded by Richard Shoemaker	Member of the Wisconsin State Assembly from the 41st district January 7, 1985–January 2, 1995	Succeeded by Luther Olsen
Wisconsin Senate
Preceded by Joseph Leean	Member of the Wisconsin Senate from the 14th district September 20, 1995–January 3, 2005	Succeeded by Luther Olsen
