= John E. Niederhuber =

American oncologist

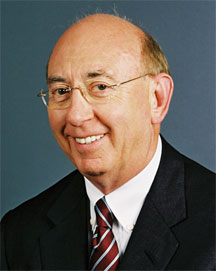
John E. Niederhuber, MD

John Edward Niederhuber is an American oncologist who was the 13th director of the National Cancer Institute (NCI), from 2006 until July 2010, succeeding Andrew von Eschenbach, who went on to become a director at biotechnology firm BioTime. A nationally renowned surgeon and researcher, Dr. Niederhuber has dedicated his four-decade career to the treatment and study of cancer - as a professor, cancer center director, National Cancer Advisory Board chair, external advisor to the NCI, grant reviewer, and laboratory investigator supported by NCI and the National Institutes of Health. He is now Executive Vice President/CEO of the Inova Translational Medicine Institute and Inova Health System and co-director, Johns Hopkins Clinical Research Network.

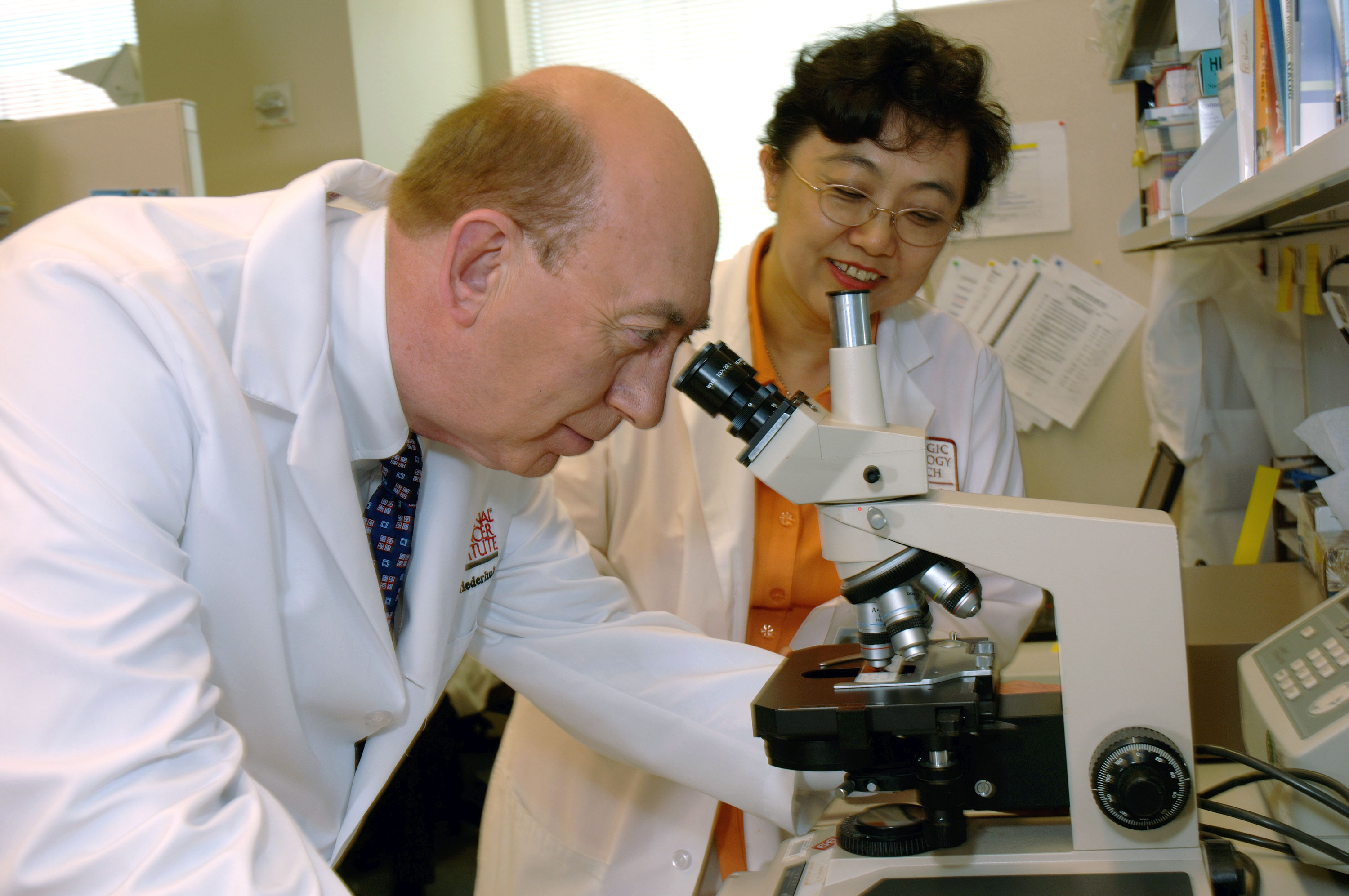
Dr. Niederhuber at work.

== Research work ==
In addition to his management of NCI, Dr. Niederhuber remained involved in research, through his laboratory on the National Institutes of Health campus. Under his leadership, the Laboratory of Tumor and Stem Cell Biology, which is a part of the Cell and Cancer Biology Branch of NCI's Center for Cancer Research, is studying tissue stem cells as the cell-of-origin for cancer. He is working to identify, fully characterize, and isolate this population of cells, with the hypothesis that they might become a therapeutic target. The lab is also studying the complex relationship between tumor cells and their microenvironment. Studies focus on how normal stroma (connective tissue) is changed during tumor progression and on strategies for preventing the development of tumors by manipulating the microenvironment. While at NCI, Dr. Niederhuber began The Cancer Genome Atlas (TCGA), and he had important impact in the areas of nanobiology and subcellular imaging of cancer.

== Surgical work ==
While at NCI, Dr. Niederhuber also held a clinical appointment on the NIH Clinical Center Medical Staff.

As a surgeon, Dr. Niederhuber's clinical emphasis is on gastrointestinal cancer, hepatobiliary (liver, bile duct, and gallbladder) cancer, and breast cancer. He is recognized for his pioneering work in hepatic artery infusion chemotherapy and was the first to demonstrate the feasibility of totally implantable vascular access devices.

== Earlier career ==
Prior to his current appointment, Dr. Niederhuber was NCI's Chief Operating Officer and deputy director for Translational and Clinical Sciences, a position he assumed in September 2005. In June 2002, President Bush appointed Dr. Niederhuber as Chair of the National Cancer Advisory Board. He resigned that position in order to become NCI's Deputy Director.

Before joining the Institute in a full-time capacity, Dr. Niederhuber was a Professor of Surgery and Oncology at the University of Wisconsin School of Medicine. He also served as Director of the University of Wisconsin Comprehensive Cancer Center, from July 1997 until October 2002. Earlier in his career, Dr. Niederhuber chaired the Department of Surgery at Stanford University.

Dr. Niederhuber is a board member of C-Change, an organization led by former president and Mrs. Bush and Sen. Dianne Feinstein. He served as vice-chair of the C-Change Business Planning and Budget committee from 2002 to 2004. He is a member of the prestigious CEO Roundtable and has served that organization as co-chair of its task force to develop a plan for future oncology development. Dr. Niederhuber has been a member of the Society of Surgical Oncology since 1978 and served as its president from 2001 to 2002. He was president of the Association of American Cancer Institutes from 2001 to 2003 and was a founding member (and executive committee member) of the American College of Surgeons Oncology Cooperative Group. He was a member of the American College of Surgeons Commission on Cancer from 1983 to 1995, chairing the commission from 1989 to 1990.

Over his career, Dr. Niederhuber has been a long-time external advisor to the National Cancer Institute. He served as a member of the NCI Cancer Centers Review Committee from 1984 to 1986 and was, from 1986 to 1991, a member of the NCI Division of Cancer Treatment's Board of Scientific Counselors, which he chaired from 1987 to 1991. He was a member of the National Cancer Advisory Board's Subcommittee to Evaluate the National Cancer Program (Committee to Assess Measures of Progress Against Cancer) and chaired the Molecular Medicine Panel from 1993 to 1995.

Among his numerous other board and committee memberships, Dr. Niederhuber served on the General Motors Cancer Research Foundation Kettering Prize Selection Committee (1988-1989) and twice served on the GMCRF Awards Assembly, from 1988 to 1992 and from 1998 to 2002. He chaired the American Society of Clinical Oncology Surgical Oncology Task Force for the 2001-2002 strategic planning process and the ASCO Public Policy and Practice Committee, in 2002 and 2003. He served as a member of the Burroughs-Wellcome Foundation Translational Research Advisory Committee from 1999 to 2006.

== Education ==
Dr. Niederhuber is a graduate of Bethany College in West Virginia and the Ohio State University School of Medicine. He was an NIH Academic Trainee in Surgery at the University of Michigan from 1969 to 1970 and was a visiting fellow in the Division of Immunology at The Karolinska Institute in Stockholm, Sweden from 1970 to 1971. He completed his training in surgery at the University of Michigan in 1973 and was a member of the faculty of the University of Michigan from 1973 to 1987, being promoted to Professor of Microbiology/Immunology and Professor of Surgery in 1980. During 1986 and 1987, he was visiting professor in the Department of Molecular Biology and Genetics at The Johns Hopkins University School of Medicine in Baltimore, Md.

Dr. Niederhuber joined the faculty at Johns Hopkins in 1987 as Professor of Surgery, Oncology, and Molecular Biology and Genetics. In 1991, he was appointed Emile Holman Professor of Surgery, Professor of Microbiology and Immunology, and Chair of the Department of Surgery, Stanford University. He left Stanford in 1997 to become the Director of the University of Wisconsin Comprehensive Cancer Center, where he guided the consolidation of the university's two distinguished NCI-supported cancer centers.

== Awards ==
Dr. Niederhuber has received a U.S. Public Health Service Career Development Award from the National Institute of Allergy and Infectious Diseases and the Distinguished Faculty Service Award from the University of Michigan. He has also been recognized with the Alumni Achievement Award from The Ohio State University College of Medicine in 1989 and the Distinguished Alumni Award in Medicine from Bethany College in 1995. Dr. Niederhuber was elected to Who's Who in America in 1998 and Who's Who in Medicine and Health Care in 1997. In addition, he has received numerous honorary professorships and is currently serving on the editorial board of 10 scientific journals. Dr. Niederhuber was a member of the editorial board of the Journal of Clinical Oncology, from 1993 to 1995. He has authored and coauthored more than 180 publications and edited four books, including (with distinguished colleagues) the reference text Clinical Oncology, currently in its third edition.

Government offices
Preceded by Andrew von Eschenbach	13th Director of the National Cancer Institute; 2006 – 2010	Succeeded by Harold E. Varmus
