= Wisconsin Department of Children and Families =

Wisconsin state government agency

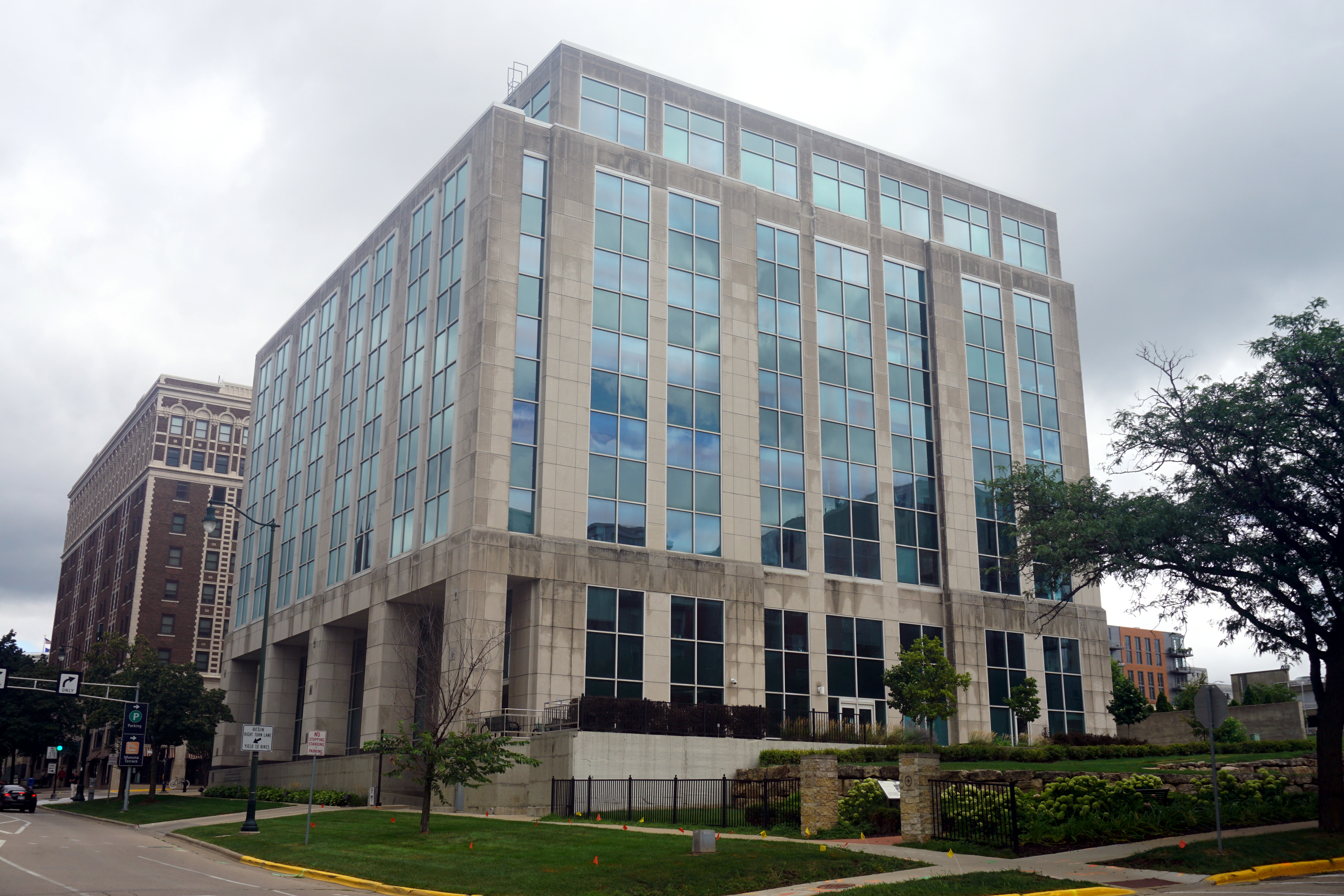
- Tommy G. Thompson Center

Agency overview
- Formed: July 1, 2008
- Preceding agencies: Wisconsin Department of Public Welfare (1939–1967); Wisconsin Department of Health and Social Services (1967–1996); Wisconsin Department of Health and Family Services (1996–2008)
- Headquarters: Tommy G. Thompson Building (TGT) 201 W. Washington Ave. Madison, Wisconsin, U.S. 43°04′21.8″N 89°23′10.4″W
- Employees: 798.17 (2023)
- Annual budget: $2,883,541,900 USD (2023)
- Agency executives: Jeff Pertl, Secretary; Nadya Pérez-Reyes, Deputy Secretary; Jessica Justman, Assistant Secretary
- Website: Agency website; Agency twitter

The Wisconsin Department of Children and Families (DCF) is an agency of the Wisconsin state government responsible for providing services to assist children and families and to oversee county offices handling those services. This includes child protective services, adoption and foster care services, and juvenile justice services. It also manages the licensing and regulation of facilities involved in the foster care and day care systems, performs background investigations of child care providers, and investigates incidents of potential child abuse or neglect. It administers the Wisconsin Works (W-2) program, the child care subsidy program, child support enforcement and paternity establishment services, and programs related to the federal Temporary Assistance to Needy Families (TANF) income support program.

The Department is currently led by Secretary-designee Jeff Pertl, an appointee of Governor Tony Evers. The DCF secretary is a cabinet member appointed by the Governor of Wisconsin and confirmed by the Wisconsin Senate.

The Department's main office is located in the Tommy G. Thompson Building (TGT) in downtown Madison, Wisconsin; it maintains regional offices throughout the state.

== History ==
The Department of Children and Families is the latest incarnation of a state agency to consolidate administration and oversight of children and family welfare services. In the early years of Wisconsin statehood, welfare services were largely created and controlled at the local level. Over the first three decades of statehood, the state government established boards to oversee and accredit these local organizations, with separate boards overseeing institutions for the care of prisoners; juveniles; and blind, deaf, or mentally ill persons. These early state boards were consolidated in 1871 under the supervision of the State Board of Charities and Reform. The separate boards were abolished in 1881, and their duties transferred to the State Board of Supervision of Wisconsin Charitable, Reformatory, and Penal Institutions. This board was consolidated with the State Board of Charities and Reform in 1891 as the State Board of Control of the Wisconsin Reformatory, Charitable and Penal Institutions (1891 Wisconsin Act 221).

By the time of the New Deal in the 1930s, Wisconsin had already pioneered a number of public welfare programs which would soon become national policy, including aid to children and pensions for the elderly. "The Wisconsin Children's Code," (1929 Wisconsin Act 439), was considered one of the most comprehensive in the nation. The state's initial response to the new federal funding was to establish separate departments to administer social security funds and other public welfare programs.

After several attempts through the 1930s, the Wisconsin Legislature established the State Department of Public Welfare in 1939 (1939 Wisconsin Act 435), to provide unified administration of all welfare programs.

In 1967, a state commission under William R. Kellett, which had been appointed by Governor Warren P. Knowles, recommended the consolidation of health and welfare functions under a new agency known as the Department of Health and Social Services (DHSS). The new agency was directed by a newly created Board of Health and Social Services, appointed by the governor, and a secretary, selected by the board. In 1975, however, the Legislature abolished the board and vested control in a secretary, to be directly appointed by the Governor with the advice and consent of the State Senate.

The 1960s and 70s saw an expansion of public welfare programs at both the state and federal level, including the establishment of Medicaid and Medicare, drug treatment programs, food stamps, Aid to Families with Dependent Children, and increased regulation of nursing homes and hospitals. DHSS was assigned additional oversight over child support, investigations of child abuse and neglect, and welfare reform during the 1980s.

In the 1990s, under Governor Tommy Thompson, welfare reform became an important pillar of the policies of his government. After Republicans gained control of the Legislature in 1994, they set about enacting a transformation of state welfare programs, creating Wisconsin Works and other welfare to work programs. In 1995 Wisconsin Act 27, DHSS transitioned into the Department of Health and Family Services (DHFS), and welfare-related programs were split off into the newly-created Wisconsin Department of Workforce Development.

The most recent reorganization occurred in 2007, under Democratic Governor Jim Doyle with a divided Legislature. The current Department of Children and Families was created by 2007 Wisconsin Act 20, which became effective on July 1, 2008. The law divided the DHFS into the Wisconsin Department of Health Services and the Wisconsin Department of Children and Families, and brought back a number of the welfare-related programs from the Wisconsin Department of Workforce Development to the new Department of Children and Families. The first secretary of the Wisconsin Department of Children and Families was Reginald Bicha.

== Organization ==
=== Leadership ===
The senior leadership of the Department consists of the Secretary, Deputy Secretary, and Assistant Secretary.

- Secretary: Jeff Pertl
- Deputy Secretary: Nadya Perez-Reyes
- Assistant Secretary: Jessica Justman

=== Divisions ===
==== Office of the Secretary ====
The Office of the Secretary is the central management of the department and provides support to the Secretary in formulating department policies.

Offices include:

- Communications
- Office of Legal Counsel
- Office of the Inspector General
- Office of Budget & Policy
- Tribal Affairs Liaison
- Legislative Liaison
- Urban Liaison

==== Division of Early Care and Education ====
The Division of Early Care and Education (DECE) manages child care licensing and regulation.

Bureaus include:

- Child Care Licensing and Certification
- Milwaukee County Child Care Administration
- YoungStar Program - a child care quality-improvement program
- Wisconsin Shares - a child care subsidy program
- Operations & Planning
- Program Integrity

==== Division of Management Services ====
The Division of Management Services (DMS) handles administrative services to support the mission of the department.

Bureaus include:

- Financial Management
- Information Systems & Technology
- Human Resources Services & Employment Relations
- Affirmative Action & Civil Rights Compliance
- Purchasing & Contract Administration
- Facilities Management
- Project Management
- Regional Operations

==== Division of Family and Economic Security ====
The Division of Family and Economic Security (DFES) manages programs to provide short term welfare assistance and resources.

Bureaus include:

- Wisconsin Works - Wisconsin's welfare-to-work program
- Child Support
- Refugee Services
- Transform Milwaukee & Transitional Jobs Programs - subsidized jobs programs for workers transitioning into a new industry or occupation

==== Division of Milwaukee Child Protective Services ====
The Division of Milwaukee Child Protective Services (DMCPS) works to ensure the safety and well-being of children in Milwaukee County. Direct responsibility for Milwaukee County child services has resided with the state agency since 1995.

==== Division of Safety and Permanence ====
The Division of Safety and Permanence (DSP) manages programs to ensure safe placement of children who have been victims of abuse, neglect, or trafficking, and seeks to improve long-term outcomes for foster youth and children in the juvenile justice system.

Bureaus include:

- Child Welfare Foster Care and Adoption Assistance
- Bureau of Youth Services
- Juvenile Justice Youth Aids Program
- Domestic Abuse Prevention

=== Statutory commissions ===
Separate from the ordinary organizational structure of the Department, there are two commissions created by the Governor or acts of the Wisconsin Legislature to oversee, advise, or administer certain functions.

- Governor's Council on Domestic Abuse
- Rate Regulation Advisory Committee

=== Attached independent entities ===
==== Child Abuse and Neglect Prevention Board ====
The Child Abuse and Neglect Prevention Board administers the Children's Trust Fund, which was created to fund strategies to prevent child abuse and neglect in Wisconsin. The board also recommends changes in statutes, policies, budges, or regulations to reduce child abuse and neglect.

==== Milwaukee Child Welfare Partnership Council ====
The Milwaukee Child Welfare Partnership Council makes recommendations for plans to improve the child welfare system in Milwaukee County.

== Secretaries ==
The Secretary of the Wisconsin Department of Children and Families is a cabinet member appointed by the Governor of Wisconsin and confirmed by the Wisconsin Senate.

Name	Took office	Left office	Governor
Reginald Bicha	2008	2011	Jim Doyle
Eloise Anderson	2011	2019	Scott Walker
Emilie Amundson	2019	2024	Tony Evers
Jeff Pertl	2024		Tony Evers

== See also ==
- Administration for Children and Families
- Wisconsin Department of Workforce Development
- Wisconsin Department of Health Services
