= Lester Crawford =

American government official

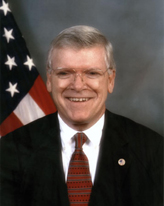

19th Commissioner of Food and Drugs
- In office July 18, 2005 – September 23, 2005
- President: George W. Bush
- Preceded by: Mark McClellan
- Succeeded by: Andrew von Eschenbach

Personal details
- Born: March 13, 1938 Demopolis, Alabama
- Died: December 23, 2021 (aged 83) Athens, Georgia
- Spouse: Catherine Walker (m. 1963)
- Education: Auburn University (DVM); University of Georgia (PhD)

Lester Mills Crawford, Jr. (March 13, 1938 – December 23, 2021) was an American veterinarian and government official who served as the former Commissioner of the U.S. Food and Drug Administration, being appointed by President George W. Bush. He served from July 18, 2005 until resigning two months later in September 2005.

On October 17, 2006, he pleaded guilty to a conflict of interest and false reporting of information about stocks he owned in food, beverage and medical device companies he was in charge of regulating. He received a sentence of three years of supervised probation and a fine of about $90,000.

== Early life ==
Crawford was born on 13 March 1938 in Demopolis, Alabama to Lester Mills Crawford, Sr. and Doris Crawford.

== Education ==
Crawford received a Doctor of Veterinary Medicine (DVM) degree from Auburn University in 1963 and a Ph.D. in pharmacology from the University of Georgia in 1969.

== Career ==
He was Chairman of Pharmacology and Physiology and Associate Dean of the College of Veterinary Medicine at the University of Georgia from 1966 to 1982.

From 1978 to 1980 and from 1982 to 1985 Crawford was director of the FDA's Center for Veterinary Medicine. From 1987 to 1991 Crawford was administrator of the Food Safety and Inspection Service at the U.S. Department of Agriculture. From 1997 to 2002, he was Director of the Center for Food and Nutrition Policy, based at Georgetown University before moving to Virginia Tech in 2001. Previously in his career he was chair of the Department of Physiology-Pharmacology at the University of Georgia, executive vice president of the National Food Processors Association, executive director of the Association of American Veterinary Medical Colleges, and a practicing veterinarian.

In 2004 he worked for the Bush-Cheney election campaign of 2004 as well as being a member of the National Republican Senatorial Committee.

Crawford served as a FDA Deputy Commissioner since February 25, 2002, and served as acting Commissioner for some of this time.

== Food and Drug nomination ==
His 2005 nomination was controversial because Senators Hillary Clinton of New York and Patty Murray of Washington, both Democrats, threatened to place holds on his confirmation vote until the FDA made its long-delayed decision on whether or not to allow emergency contraception to be sold over the counter, while Senator Tom Coburn of Oklahoma, a Republican, threatened to place a hold because the FDA failed to require new labels for condoms warning that they do not fully protect against sexually transmitted disease.

== Food and Drug Commissioner ==
The Health, Education, Labor, and Pensions Committee approved the nomination on June 15, 2005, and Crawford was confirmed by the Senate on July 18, 2005 by a vote of 78-16, with six senators not voting.

Crawford resigned on September 23, 2005, just a few short months later, in a surprise announcement. He denied that allegations of financial improprieties were the reason for his departure. Bush nominated Andrew von Eschenbach to succeed Crawford. Crawford joined a Washington lobbying firm, Policy Directions Inc.

On April 28, 2006, Crawford's lawyer, Barbara Van Gelder, announced that he was being investigated by a grand jury over accusations of financial improprieties and false statements to Congress.

On October 16, 2006, the U.S. Department of Justice charged Crawford with lying and violating conflict-of-interest laws for falsely reporting his ownership of stock in companies regulated by the FDA. He falsely stated in a 2004 government filing that he and his wife sold their shares of Sysco and Kimberly-Clark, when in fact they continued to hold them, and also failed to disclose income from exercising stock options in Embrex Inc.

== Personal life ==
Crawford was married since 1963 to Catherine Walker of Birmingham, Alabama. They had two daughters, Leigh and Mary, and four grandchildren.

Crawford was a devout Christian and enjoyed gardening, reading, and Single malt Scotch. He died in Athens, Georgia on 23 December 2021 after a long illness. He was eighty-three years old.

== Honors ==
Crawford was awarded a honorary doctorate from the University of Budapest in veterinary medicine. He was additionally a member of the National Academy of Sciences Institute of Medicine. He was a Fellow of the Royal Society of Medicine (UK) and a Fellow of the International Society of Food Science and Technology. In 1984, he was inducted into the French Academy of Veterinary Medicine. In 1991, he received the Wooldridge Award, the British Veterinary Association's highest award.
