= Galloway, Wisconsin =

Unincorporated community in Wisconsin, United States

- Unincorporated community
- Location within Wisconsin Location within the United States
- Coordinates: 44°42′46″N 89°15′51″W
- Country: United States
- State: Wisconsin
- County: Marathon
- Elevation: 1,171 ft (357 m)
- Time zone: UTC-6 (Central (CST))
  - Summer (DST): UTC-5 (CDT)
- ZIP code: 54432
- Area codes: 715 & 534
- GNIS feature ID: 1565385

Galloway is an unincorporated community in the Town of Franzen in Marathon County, Wisconsin, United States. It is located on Wisconsin Highway 49, south of Elderon. The community was named for Charles A. Galloway, a partner in a Fond du Lac lumber company. The Galloway post office was established in May, 1904, with Aldolph Torgerson as the first postmaster. The ZIP code is 54432.
