= 1994 United States Senate election in Wisconsin =

- November 8, 1994
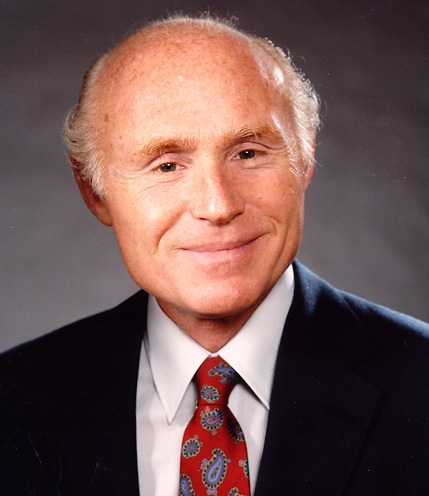

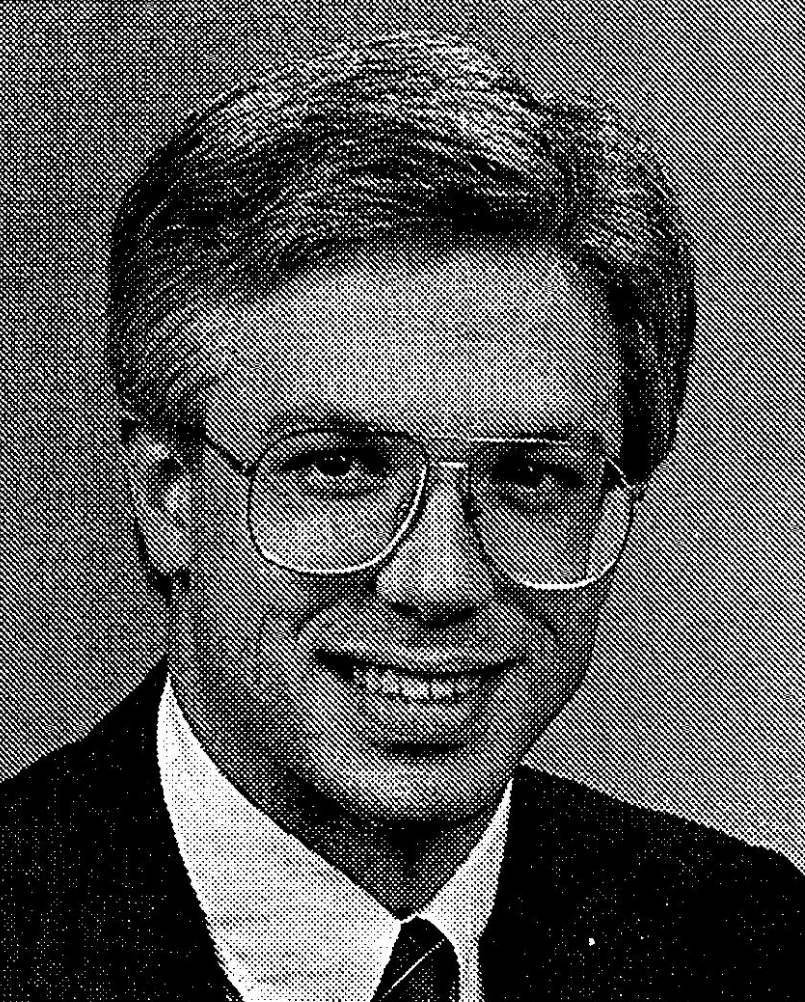
Nominee	Herb Kohl	Robert Welch
Party	Democratic	Republican
Popular vote	912,662	636,989
Percentage	58.31%	40.70%
- Kohl: 40–50% 50–60% 60–70% 70–80% 80–90% >90% Welch: 40–50% 50–60% 60–70% 70–80% 80–90% >90% Tie
U.S. senator before election
Herb Kohl
Democratic
Elected U.S. Senator
Herb Kohl
Democratic

The 1994 United States Senate election in Wisconsin was held November 8, 1994. Incumbent Democrat U.S. Senator Herb Kohl won re-election to a second term.

== Major candidates ==
=== Democratic ===
- Herb Kohl, incumbent U.S. Senator

=== Republican ===
- Robert Welch, State Representative
- Cathy Zeuske, State Treasurer

== Results ==
General election results
Party	Candidate	Votes	%
Democratic	Herb Kohl (Incumbent)	912,662	58.31%
Republican	Robert T. Welch	636,989	40.70%
Libertarian	James R. Dean	15,439	0.99%
Democratic hold			

== See also ==
- 1994 United States Senate elections
