= Harold E. Varmus =

American scientist (born 1939)

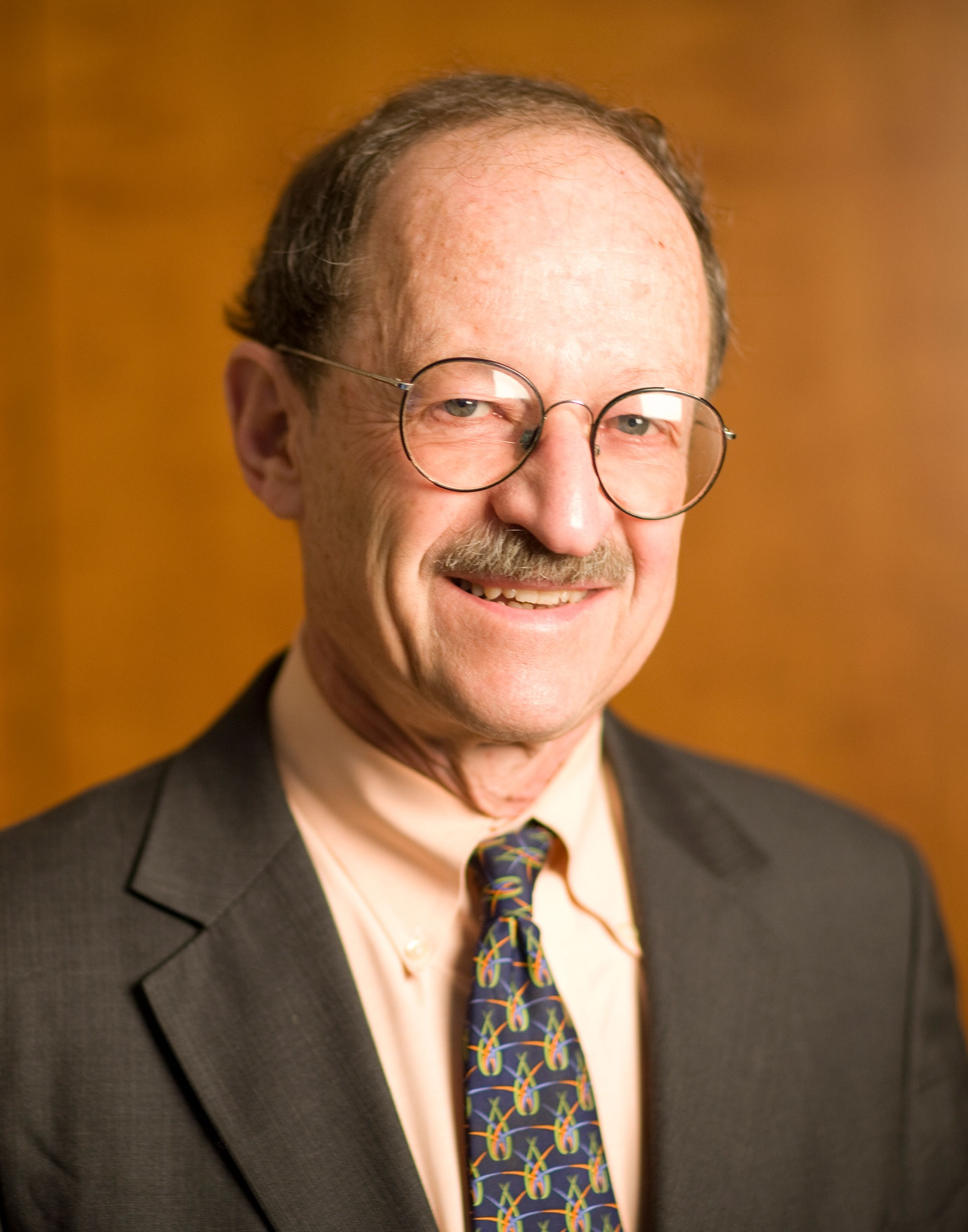
- Varmus in 2009

14th Director of the National Cancer Institute
- In office 2010–2015
- President: Barack Obama
- Preceded by: John E. Niederhuber
- Succeeded by: Douglas R. Lowy (Acting); Norman Sharpless

14th Director of the National Institutes of Health
- In office November 23, 1993 – December 31, 1999
- President: Bill Clinton
- Preceded by: Bernadine Healy
- Succeeded by: Elias Zerhouni

Personal details
- Born: Harold Eliot Varmus; December 18, 1939 (age 86) Oceanside, New York, U.S
- Spouse: Constance Louise Casey (m. 1969)
- Children: 2
- Scientific career
- Education: Amherst College (BA); Harvard University (MA); Columbia University (MD)
- Known for: Retroviral oncogenes; PLOS
- Awards: Nobel Prize in Physiology or Medicine (1989); Vannevar Bush Award (2001)
- Fields: Cancer biology
- Workplaces: University of California, San Francisco; National Institutes of Health; Memorial Sloan Kettering Cancer Center; National Cancer Institute; Weill Cornell Medicine; Columbia Presbyterian Medical Center
- Doctoral students: Kirsten Bibbins-Domingo; Tyler Jacks

Harold Eliot Varmus (born December 18, 1939) is an American Nobel Prize-winning scientist. He is currently the Lewis Thomas University Professor of Medicine at Weill Cornell Medicine and a senior associate at the New York Genome Center.

He was a co-recipient (along with J. Michael Bishop) of the 1989 Nobel Prize in Physiology or Medicine for discovery of the cellular origin of retroviral oncogenes. He was also the director of the National Institutes of Health from 1993 to 1999 and the 14th Director of the National Cancer Institute from 2010 to 2015, a post to which he was appointed by President Barack Obama.

== Early life and education ==
Varmus was born on December 18, 1939, to Beatrice, a social service worker, and Frank Varmus, a physician, Jewish parents of Eastern European descent, in Oceanside, New York. In 1957, he graduated from Freeport High School in Freeport, New York, and enrolled at Amherst College, intending to follow in his father's footsteps as a medical doctor, but eventually graduating with a B.A. in English literature. He went on to earn an M.A. in English at Harvard University in 1962, before changing his mind once again and applying to medical schools. He was twice rejected from Harvard Medical School. That same year, he entered the Columbia University College of Physicians and Surgeons and later worked at a missionary hospital in Bareilly, India, and the Columbia Presbyterian Medical Center. As an alternative to serving militarily in the Vietnam War, Varmus joined the Public Health Service at the National Institutes of Health in 1968. Working under Ira Pastan, he researched the regulation of bacterial gene expression by cyclic AMP. In 1970, he began postdoctoral research in Bishop's lab at University of California, San Francisco.

== Scientific career and research accomplishments ==
To fulfill his national service obligations during the Vietnam War, Varmus became a member of the commissioned corps of the Public Health Service, working as a Clinical Associate in the laboratory of Ira Pastan at the National Institutes of Health from 1968 to 1970. During this first period of laboratory research, he and Pastan and their colleagues described aspects of the mechanism by which the lac operon of E. coli is regulated transcriptionally by cyclic AMP. In 1970, he and his wife, Constance Casey, moved to San Francisco, where he began post-doctoral studies with Michael Bishop at University of California, San Francisco under a fellowship from the California Division of the American Cancer Society. Appointed as an assistant professor in the UCSF Department of Microbiology and Immunology in 1972, he was promoted to professor in 1979 and became an American Cancer Society Research Professor in 1984.

During the course of his years at UCSF (1970 to 1993), Varmus's scientific work was focused principally on the mechanisms by which retroviruses replicate, cause cancers in animals, and produce cancer-like changes in cultured cells. Much of this work was conducted jointly with Michael Bishop in a notably long scientific partnership. Their best-known accomplishment was the identification of a cellular gene (c-Src) that gave rise to the v-Src oncogene of Rous sarcoma virus, a cancer-causing virus first isolated from a chicken sarcoma by Peyton Rous in 1910. Their discovery triggered the identification of many other cellular proto-oncogenes—progenitors of viral oncogenes and targets for mutations that drive human cancers. Much of this work and its consequences are described in his Nobel lecture and Bishop's, in Varmus's book The Art and Politics of Science, and in numerous histories of cancer research.

Other significant components of Varmus's scientific work over the past four and a half decades include descriptions of the mechanisms by which retroviral DNA is synthesized and integrated into chromosomes; discovery of the Proto-oncogene Wnt-1 with Roel Nusse; elucidation of aspects of the replication cycle of hepatitis B virus (with Donald Ganem); discovery of ribosomal frameshifting to make retroviral proteins (with Tyler Jacks); isolation of a cellular receptor for avian retroviruses (with John Young and Paul Bates); characterization of mutations of the epidermal growth factor receptor gene in human lung cancers, including a common mutation that confers drug resistance (with William Pao); and generation of numerous mouse models of human cancer. Notably, Varmus continued to conduct or direct laboratory work throughout his service in leadership positions at the NIH, MSKCC, and NCI.

== Politics and government service ==
In the early 1990s, following the award of their Nobel Prize, Varmus and Bishop became active in the politics of science, working principally with UCSF colleagues Bruce Alberts and Marc Kirschner, and with the Joint Steering Committee (later renamed the Coalition for the Life Sciences). He also co-chaired Scientists and Engineers for Clinton-Gore during the 1992 presidential campaign.

In 2025, Dr. Varmus was among 75 Nobel Laureates that advocated that Robert Kennedy Jr. not be confirmed as Secretary of Health and Human Services due to concerns on the public health impact of the nomination given Mr. Kennedy's previous comments on vaccines and lack of health policy experiences.

=== National Institutes of Health directorship ===
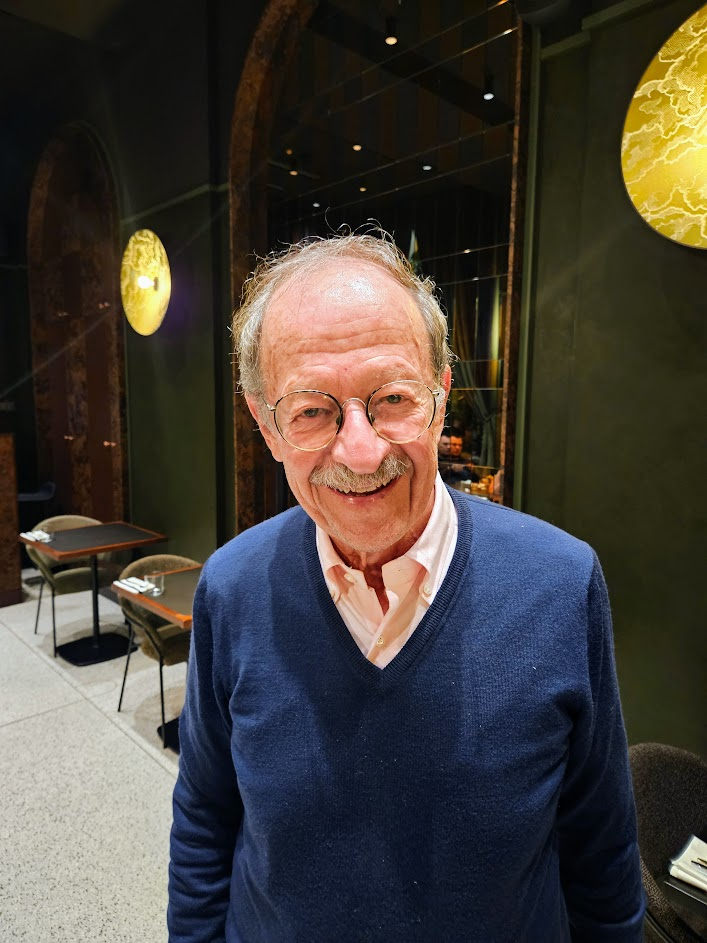
Harold E. Varmus in 2025 in Poland

After the resignation of NIH Director Bernadine Healy in April, 1993, Varmus was nominated for the post by President William J. Clinton in July, and confirmed by the Senate in November. As the NIH director, Varmus was credited with helping to nearly double the research agency's budget; his tenure was also noted for appointments of outstanding scientists to serve as Institute Directors; for excellent relationships with members of Congress and the Administration; for leadership on clinical and AIDS research; for policy statements about stem cell research, cloning of organisms, gene therapy, and patenting; for promoting global health research, especially on malaria; and for construction of new facilities, including a new Clinical Center and a Vaccine Research Center at the NIH.

=== Between directorships ===
Varmus supported the presidential candidacies of Al Gore (2000) and John Kerry (2004). During the George W. Bush presidency, he gave lectures critical of the Administration's science policies. But he has also written a laudatory account of PEPFAR (the President's Emergency Plan For AIDS Relief), Bush's initiative to combat AIDS globally.

Varmus declared his support for Barack Obama's quest for the presidency early in 2008 and chaired the campaign's Science and Technology Committee. Following Obama's election, he was named by the president-elect as one of three co-chairs of PCAST (the President's Council of Advisors on Science and Technology). He resigned from that post to assume the directorship of the National Cancer Institute (NCI) on July 12, 2010, after being named to the post by President Obama.

=== National Cancer Institute directorship ===
On May 17, 2010, the White House announced that Varmus would become the 14th Director of the NCI, making him the first person to have served as director of an individual NIH Institute after being director of the entire NIH. In this capacity, despite diminishing budgets at all the Institutes including NCI, he started new administrative centers for cancer genomics and global health; initiated novel grant programs for "outstanding investigators," for "staff scientists," and for addressing "Provocative Questions." He also renamed the Frederick National Laboratory for Cancer Research and started an initiative there to study RAS oncogenes.

On March 4, 2015, Varmus submitted his resignation to the president, effective March 31, 2015, announcing his intention to return to New York City as the Lewis Thomas University Professor of Medicine at Weill Cornell Medicine and as a senior associate at the New York Genome Center. Deputy NCI Director Douglas Lowy became acting director of the NCI on April 1, 2015.

During his tenure as NCI Director, Varmus took the unusual step of co-authoring with three non-governmental colleagues a critique of several practices prevalent in the biomedical research community. That essay has been the starting point for several subsequent efforts to reduce the hypercompetitive atmosphere in biomedical research.

== Presidency of Memorial Sloan Kettering Cancer Center ==
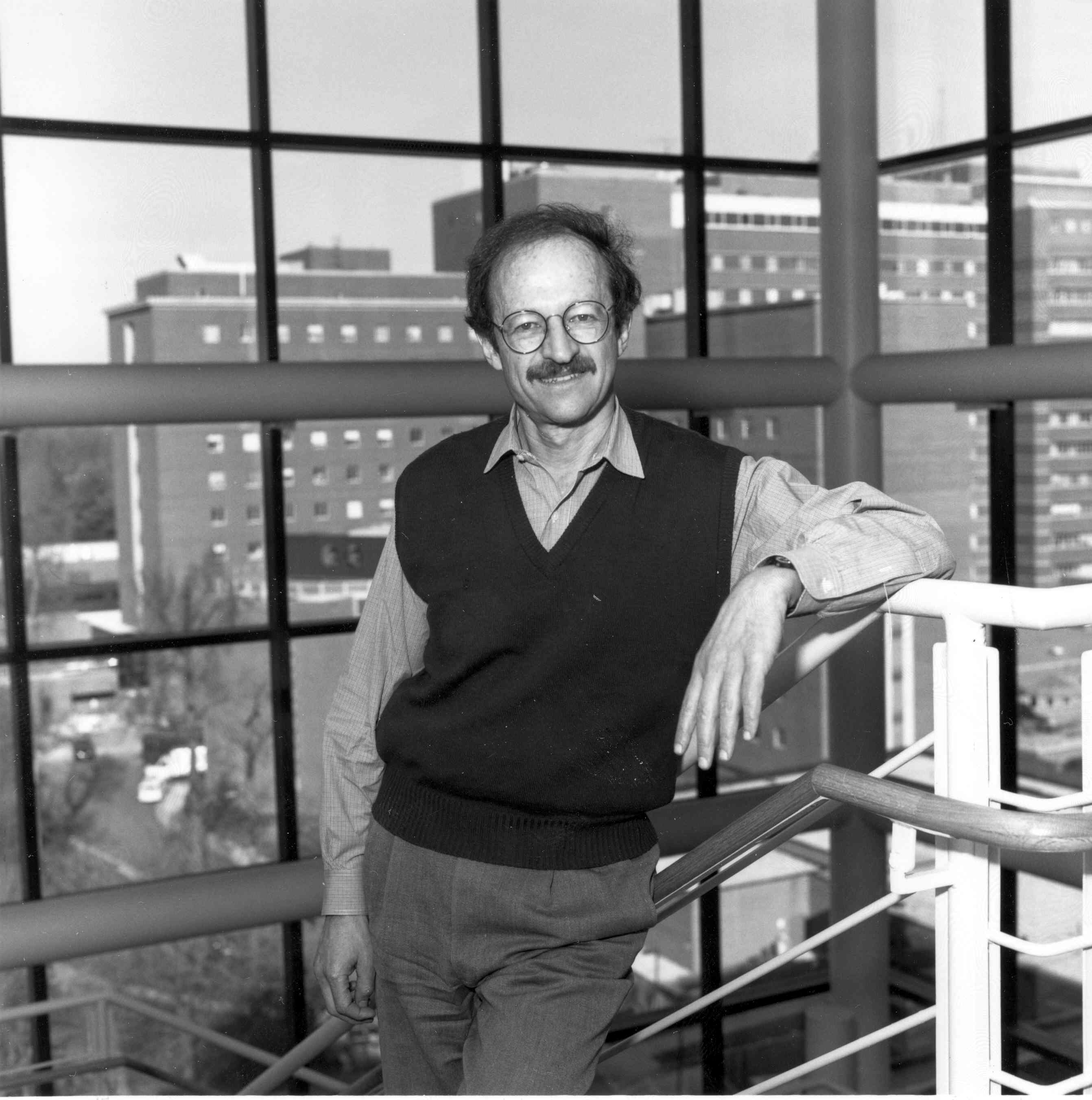
Varmus in 2000

After leaving the NIH Directorship at the end of 1999, Varmus became the president and CEO of Memorial Sloan-Kettering Cancer Center in New York City on January 1, 2000. During his ten and a half years at MSKCC, he was best known for enlarging the basic and translational research faculty; building a major new laboratory facility, the Mortimer E. Zuckerman Research Center; starting a new graduate school for cancer biology (the Louis V. Gerstner Jr. Graduate School of Biomedical Sciences); overseeing renovation and construction of many clinical facilities; and leading a major capital campaign. He also continued to run an active laboratory and to teach as a Member of the Sloan-Kettering Institute. On January 12, 2010, MSKCC reported that Varmus had asked the MSKCC Boards of Overseers and Managers "to begin a search for his successor." He left MSKCC on June 30, 2010, shortly before assuming the NCI directorship.

== Publication practices in science ==
Near the end of his tenure as NIH director, Varmus became a champion of ways to more effectively use the Internet to enhance access to scientific papers. The first practical outcome was the establishment, with David Lipman of the National Center for Biotechnology Information at NIH, of PubMed Central, a public digital library of full-length scientific reports; in 2007, Congress directed NIH to ensure that all reports of work supported by the NIH appear in PubMed Central within a year after publication. Varmus and two colleagues, Patrick Brown at Stanford and Michael Eisen at UC Berkeley, were co-founders and leaders of the board of directors of the Public Library of Science (PLOS), a not-for-profit publisher of a suite of open access journals in the biomedical sciences.

== Advisory roles ==
Varmus has been a frequent advisor to the US government, foundations, academic institutions and industry. Currently, he serves as a member of the Secretary of Energy's advisory board, the Global Health Advisory Board at the Bill and Melinda Gates Foundation, the board of directors of the International Biomedical Research Alliance, the Lasker Foundation Prize Jury, and the Scientific Advisory Board of the Broad Institute at Harvard and MIT, and he chairs advisory groups for the Faculty of 1000 and the Global Alliance for Genomics and Health. In the past, he was chairman of the Grand Challenges in Global Health at the Gates Foundation, a member of the World Health Organization's Commission on Macroeconomics and Health, and an advisor to Merck & Co., Chiron Corporation, Gilead, and Onyx Pharmaceuticals. He has been chair of the World Health Organization's Science Council since its founding in 2021

Varmus has criticized the high cost of many modern cancer drugs, which create barriers to treatment. He advocates for the genetic testing of cancers as a routine reimbursed procedure, and for wider use of the information that genetic testing of cancer can provide. He argues that widespread use of panel tests and exome analyses to identify cancer-causing mutations would be simpler and cheaper than full genome analysis. He has argued for the coverage of such services under Medicare and Medicaid on the grounds of Coverage with Evidence Development, since the data could be used to better evaluate test and treatments. He supports the creation of a database of information that can be correlated with clinical outcomes for use by all oncologists. He is hopeful that researchers will soon use new technologies to move beyond the study of primary tumors, where they have had considerable success, and explore how cancer initiates and the development of metastasic cancers.

== Awards and honors ==
- 1975: elected to the American Academy of Arts and Sciences
- 1982: Albert Lasker Award for Basic Medical Research
- 1984: Alfred P. Sloan, Jr. Prize
- 1989: Nobel Prize in Physiology or Medicine
- 1990: Golden Plate Award of the American Academy of Achievement
- 1994: elected to the American Philosophical Society
- 2002: Novartis-Drew Award
- 2005: Elected a Foreign Member of the Royal Society (ForMemRS)
- 2008: Henry G. Friesen International Prize in Health Research
- 2011: Double Helix Medal
- 2012: Glenn T. Seaborg Medal

== Personal life ==
Varmus has been married since 1969 to Constance Louise Casey, a journalist and science writer. They live on Manhattan's Upper West Side and have two sons: Jacob, a jazz trumpet player and composer who lives in Queens, and Christopher, a social worker who lives in Brooklyn. Varmus and Jacob have performed a series of lecture-concerts entitled "Genes and Jazz" at the Guggenheim and Smithsonian Museums, the Boston Museum of Science, the John F. Kennedy Center for the Performing Arts and the South Asian Summer Festival in Vancouver.

== See also ==
- List of Jewish Nobel laureates

Government offices
Preceded by Bernadine Healy	14th Director of the National Institutes of Health; 1993 – 1999	Succeeded by Elias Zerhouni
Preceded by John E. Niederhuber	14th Director of the National Cancer Institute; 2010 – 2015	Succeeded by Douglas R. Lowy (Acting); Norman Sharpless
