= Andrew von Eschenbach =

American physician

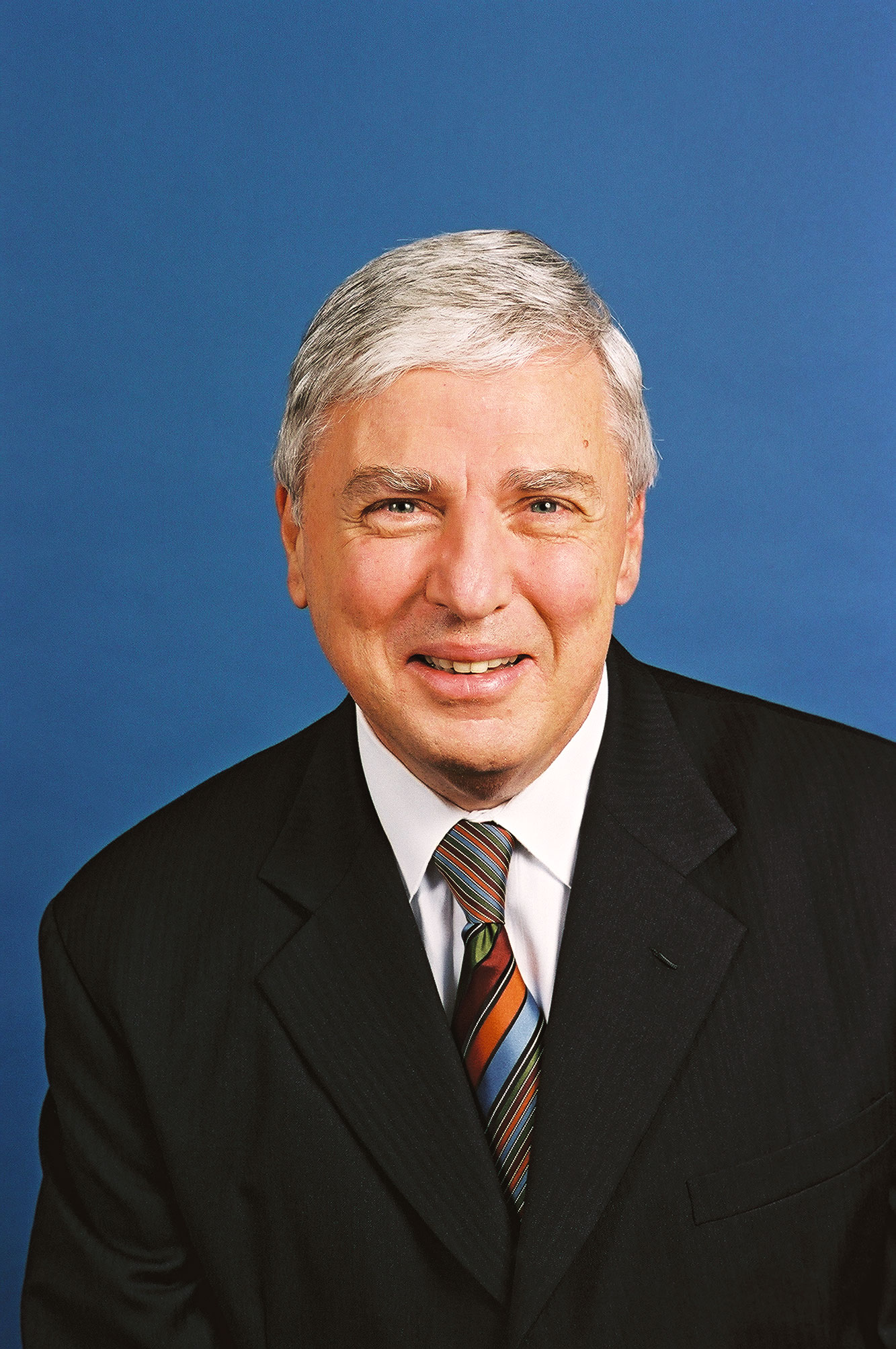

20th Commissioner of Food and Drugs
- In office December 13, 2006 – January 20, 2009
- President: George W. Bush
- Preceded by: Lester Mills Crawford
- Succeeded by: Margaret A. Hamburg

12th Director of the National Cancer Institute
- In office January 22, 2002 – June 10, 2006
- President: George W. Bush
- Preceded by: Richard D. Klausner
- Succeeded by: John E. Niederhuber

Personal details
- Born: October 30, 1941 (age 85) Philadelphia, Pennsylvania, U.S.
- Spouse: Madelyn von Eschenbach
- Children: Andrew von Eschenbach, Amanda von Eschenbach, Warren von Eschenbach, Christian von Eschenbach
- Education: St. Joseph's University, Georgetown University School of Medicine

Andrew Charles von Eschenbach (born October 30, 1941) is an American physician and government official who served the commissioner of the United States Food and Drug Administration from 2006 to 2009. He became acting Commissioner on September 26, 2005, after the resignation of his predecessor Lester Crawford, and was confirmed as Commissioner by the Senate on December 7, 2006. He was previously the 12th director of the National Cancer Institute.

Von Eschenbach currently serves on the board of directors of BioTime, a biotechnology company helmed by CEO Michael D. West. He also serves as a director of Viamet Pharmaceuticals.

== Biography ==
After graduating from St. Joseph's Preparatory School, von Eschenbach received his bachelor of science in biology from St. Joseph's University in 1963 and his MD from Georgetown University School of Medicine in 1967. He did residencies at Pennsylvania Hospital in general surgery and urology and taught urology at the University of Pennsylvania School of Medicine. He served in the US Navy Medical Corps with the rank of lieutenant commander from 1968 to 1971.

In 1976, von Eschenbach began his long association with The University of Texas M. D. Anderson Cancer Center, beginning as a urologic oncology fellow, and becoming chair of the department of urology in 1983. He was founding director of the Prostate Cancer Research Program in 1996, director of the Genitourinary Cancer Center, and held the Roy M. and Phyllis Gough Huffington Clinical Research Distinguished Chair in Urologic Oncology. Driven by his father's prostate cancer, he specialized in the disease.

Von Eschenbach was president-elect of the American Cancer Society when he was selected by President George W. Bush to head the NCI in December 2001. As director of the NCI he announced in 2003 that his organization's goal was to "eliminate suffering and death" caused by cancer by the year 2015. However, under von Eschenbach's leadership the FDA has been criticized for being too risk averse when considering life saving treatments for desperate, dying patients. For example, in 2007 the FDA failed to approve Provenge for the treatment of late stage prostate cancer against the recommendation of an independent advisory committee.

Von Eschenbach was criticized for overruling his staff recommendations, and approving the Menaflex knee implant, made by ReGen Biologics Inc., New Jersey, on a fast-track basis, after four New Jersey congressmen lobbied on ReGen's behalf. Von Eschenbach said, "We fumbled that process."

In 2006, Time named him as one of the Time 100 "People Who Shape Our World", writing that as head of the FDA, which "wields enormous influence on American lives", von Eschenbach "could make a signal contribution to the public's health" by focusing on issues of diet and obesity in addition to drugs and disease.

On August 1, 2006, Senators Clinton and Cantwell announced they would block his nomination to be the permanent FDA commissioner because of his department's failure to act on the application by Barr Pharmaceuticals to sell Plan B over-the-counter. They ultimately voted for his nomination.

Eschenbach left the FDA in 2009 to join Greenleaf Health, which counsels pharmaceutical clients, before starting his own consulting company, Samaritan Health Initiatives.

Andrew von Eschenbach was instrumental in the development and growth of the Prostate Cancer Foundation (founded by Michael Milken) since its inception in 1993 and held a board membership position and scientific advisor role at the foundation. C-Change, a forum that brings together the principal leaders of key national cancer organizations, and founded by Andrew von Eschenbach, is in partnership with the Prostate Cancer Foundation.
