= Reginald Bicha =

American politician

Reggie Bicha

Director of the Colorado Department of Human Services
- In office January 11, 2011 – February 2019
- Governor: John Hickenlooper
- Preceded by: Karen L. Beye
- Succeeded by: Michelle Barnes

1st Secretary of the Wisconsin Department of Children and Families
- In office July 1, 2008 – January 3, 2011
- Governor: Jim Doyle
- Preceded by: Position established
- Succeeded by: Eloise Anderson

Personal details
- Born: 1969 (age 56–57) Fort Worth, Texas, U.S.
- Spouse: Becky Lynn Bicha (m. 1992)
- Children: 3
- Education: University of Wisconsin–Eau Claire, University of Minnesota
- Website: Official bio

Reginald "Reggie" Bicha (born 1969) is an American social worker and government administrator. He was the first secretary of the Wisconsin Department of Children and Families (2008–2011), and then served as director of the Colorado Department of Human Services (2011–2019). Bicha is now the Chief Executive Office at the non-profit, American Public Human Services Association (APHSA) after his time as President of Acelero, Inc.

== Education ==
Born in 1969, Bicha was raised in La Crosse, Wisconsin. He was the first student Board of Education representative from Logan High School in La Crosse. After graduating in 1987, he enrolled at the University of Wisconsin–Eau Claire, earning a bachelor's degree in social work in 1992. Bicha then moved to Monroe County, Wisconsin, where he served as a social worker and child abuse investigator. In 2000, he was selected as a "Title IV-E Child Welfare Scholar" by the University of Minnesota, where he received a master's degree in social work.

== Career ==
From 2001 to 2007, Bicha was the Director of Human Services in Pierce County, Wisconsin. In 2008, Wisconsin Governor Jim Doyle tapped Bicha to become the first secretary of the Wisconsin Department of Children and Families. In that capacity, Bicha consolidated more than 30 statewide programs from two agencies into a single organization. He created the “Kidstat” performance management system to measure and improve child and family outcomes. Bicha also initiated prevention and permanency objectives aimed at reducing the number of children living in foster care.

In January 2011, Colorado Governor John Hickenlooper appointed Bicha Executive Director of the Colorado Department of Human Services. Bicha is a past president of the American Public Human Services Association, and was presented the APHSA State and Local Outstanding Member Award. In May 2015, 87 Colorado legislators delivered a letter of no-confidence to Hickenlooper, asking that he "replace or correct" the highest levels of leadership at the Colorado Department of Human Services. The letter detailed problems lawmakers attributed to mismanagement. As a response, Bicha pledged to improve communication with legislators. Hickenlooper's office released a four-page rebuttal to the letter from legislators, adding that Bicha has as "tough a job as there is".

In January 2014, Bicha was recognized with the Casey Family Programs “Excellence for Children Award” and in 2012, he was selected for the Ascend Fellowship, sponsored by the Aspen Institute, to focus on approaches to moving children and parents beyond poverty.

Government offices
New government agency	Secretary of the Wisconsin Department of Children and Families; July 1, 2008 – January 3, 2011	Succeeded by Eloise Anderson
Preceded by Karen L. Beye	Director of the Colorado Department of Human Services; January 11, 2011 – February 2019	Succeeded by Michelle Barnes
