= William A. Kasten =

American politician (born 1956)

Member of the Wisconsin State Assembly
- In office January 7, 1985 – January 5, 1987
- Preceded by: Patricia A. Goodrich
- Succeeded by: Brad Zweck
- Constituency: 86th district
- In office January 3, 1983 – January 7, 1985
- Preceded by: Jeffrey A. Neubauer
- Succeeded by: Jeffrey A. Neubauer
- Constituency: 62nd district

Personal details
- Born: 24 September 1956 (age 69) Wausau, Wisconsin, U.S.
- Party: Republican

William A. Kasten (born September 25, 1956) is a former member of the Wisconsin State Assembly.

== Biography ==
Kasten was born in Wausau, Wisconsin. After graduating from high school in Mosinee, Wisconsin, Kasten attended the United States Naval Academy before transferring to the University of Wisconsin-Madison.

== Career ==
Kasten was elected to the Assembly in 1982 and re-elected in 1984. He is a Republican.
