= William Pao =

Oncologist

- Born: 1967 (age 58–59)
- Education: Harvard University, Yale University
- Scientific career
- Fields: Oncology
- Workplaces: Memorial Sloan-Kettering Cancer Center; Vanderbilt University; Roche; Pfizer
- Doctoral advisor: Adrian Hayday
- Other academic advisors: Harold E. Varmus

William Pao (born 1967) is an oncologist and Executive Vice President and Chief Development Officer of Pfizer. He was previously the head of Pharma Research and Early Development (pRED) at Roche and a professor of medicine at the Vanderbilt University Medical Center. He is best known for his work in molecular oncology and cancer genomics.

== Education ==
William Pao studied at Harvard University and earned his MD and PhD degrees in biology from Yale University. He then did his residency training at Weill Cornell Medical School and postdoctoral fellowship with Harold E. Varmus at the Memorial Sloan Kettering Cancer Center. During that time, he did pivotal research on the tyrosine kinase of the epidermal growth factor receptor gene which identified new molecular mechanisms of sensitivity of lung cancers to inhibitors.

== Career and research ==
Pao started his career as a member of Memorial Sloan-Kettering Cancer Center. He joined Vanderbilt University as a professor in the Division of Hematology and Oncology eventually becoming head of the division and the personalized cancer medicine unit. He joined Roche as the global head of oncology disease and translational area in 2014. In 2018, he took over pRED replacing John Reed. In 2022, he joined Pfizer as Chief Development Officer.

=== Awards and honors ===
Pao was inducted into the American Society for Clinical Investigation and the Association of American Physicians.
