= Franzen, Wisconsin =

Town of Franzen, Wisconsin
- Town
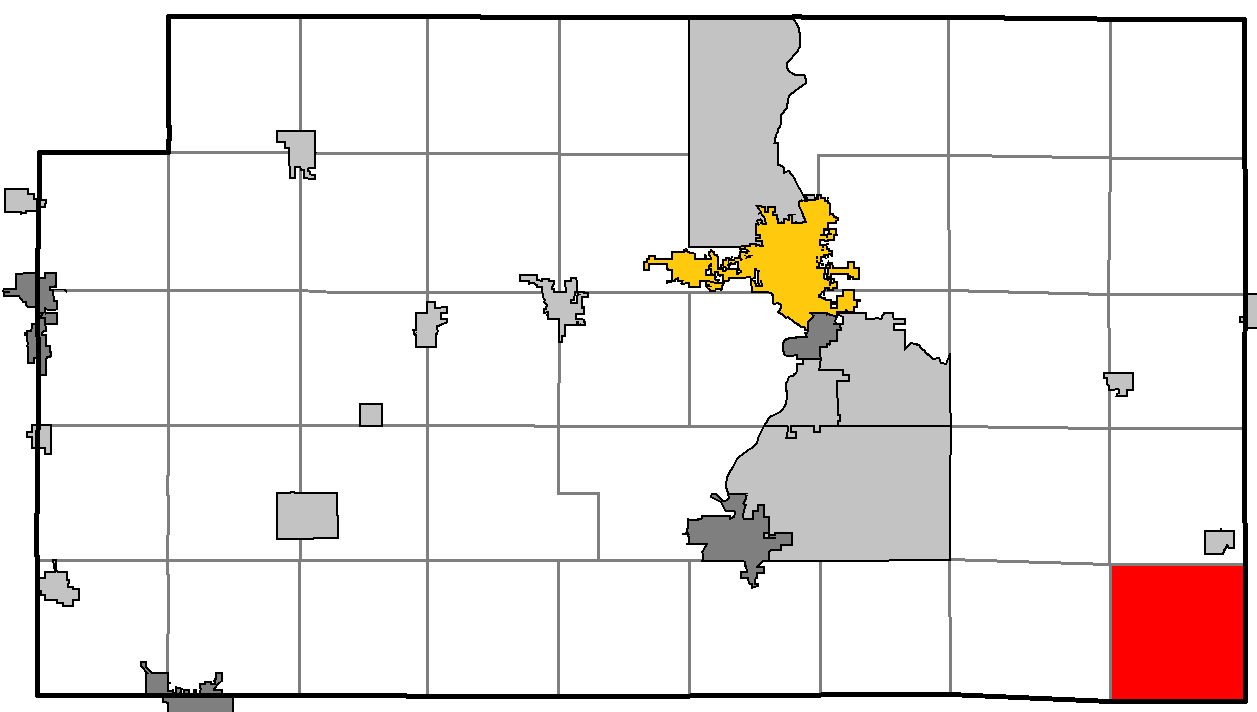
- Location of Franzen, Marathon County

- Location of Marathon County, Wisconsin
- Coordinates: 44°43′52″N 89°16′6″W
- Country: United States
- State: Wisconsin
- County: Marathon

Area
  - Total: 36.6 sq mi (94.8 km^{2})
  - Land: 36.4 sq mi (94.2 km^{2})
  - Water: 0.23 sq mi (0.6 km^{2})
- Elevation: 1,201 ft (366 m)

Population (2020)
  - Total: 553
  - Density: 15.2/sq mi (5.87/km^{2})
- Time zone: UTC-6 (Central (CST))
  - Summer (DST): UTC-5 (CDT)
- Area codes: 715 & 534
- FIPS code: 55-27450
- GNIS feature ID: 1583237

Franzen is a town in Marathon County, Wisconsin, United States. It is part of the Wausau, Wisconsin Metropolitan Statistical Area. The population was 553 at the 2020 census. The unincorporated communities of Galloway and Holt are located in the town.

== History ==
The town was named for Christian Franzen, a German native who served on the Marathon County Board.

== Geography ==
According to the United States Census Bureau, the town has a total area of 36.6 square miles (94.8 km^{2}), of which 36.4 square miles (94.2 km^{2}) is land and 0.2 square miles (0.6 km^{2}), or 0.60%, is water.

== Demographics ==
At the 2000 census, there were 505 people, 193 households, and 145 families living in the town. The population density was 13.9 people per square mile (5.4/km^{2}). There were 212 housing units at an average density of 5.8 per square mile (2.2/km^{2}). The racial makeup of the town was 98.42% White, 1.39% Native American, and 0.20% from two or more races. Of the 193 households 33.2% had children under the age of 18 living with them, 67.4% were married couples living together, 5.7% had a female householder with no husband present, and 24.4% were non-families. 20.7% of households were one person and 8.3% were one person aged 65 or older. The average household size was 2.62 and the average family size was 3.05.

The age distribution was 27.7% under the age of 18, 7.3% from 18 to 24, 27.3% from 25 to 44, 22.6% from 45 to 64, and 15.0% 65 or older. The median age was 37 years. For every 100 females, there were 107.0 males. For every 100 females age 18 and over, there were 108.6 males.

The median household income was $41,442 and the median family income was $43,295. Males had a median income of $33,750 versus $24,375 for females. The per capita income for the town was $18,623. About 6.4% of families and 7.7% of the population were below the poverty line, including 5.5% of those under age 18 and 4.9% of those age 65 or over.

== Notable people ==
- Raymond Omernick, farmer, logger, and member of the Wisconsin State Assembly, was born in the town of Franzen
