= Gerald Whitburn =

American government official

Secretary of Health and Human Services of Massachusetts
- In office November 1994 – June 30, 1996
- Governor: William F. Weld
- Preceded by: Charlie Baker
- Succeeded by: Joseph Gallant

7th Secretary of the Wisconsin Department of Health and Social Services
- In office January 1991 – November 1994
- Governor: Tommy Thompson
- Preceded by: Patricia A. Goodrich
- Succeeded by: Richard Loring (acting); Joseph Leean (confirmed)

7th Secretary of the Wisconsin Department of Industry, Labor and Human Relations
- In office June 1989 – January 1991
- Governor: Tommy Thompson
- Preceded by: John T. Coughlin
- Succeeded by: Carol Skornicka

Personal details
- Born: 1943 or 1944 (age 81–82) Marenisco, Michigan, U.S.
- Spouse: Charmaine M. Heise (m. 1969)
- Education: University of Wisconsin–Oshkosh (BA); University of Wisconsin–Madison (MA)

Gerald "Jerry" Whitburn (born 1945) is a retired American businessman and government official. He served as Secretary of the Wisconsin Department of Industry, Labor and Human Relations and later Secretary of Wisconsin Department of Health and Social Services under Governor Tommy Thompson, and subsequently served as Secretary of Health and Human Services of Massachusetts for Governor Bill Weld. He is best known for his work implementing welfare-to-work programs in the 1990s.

== Early life and education ==
Whitburn was born in Wakefield (Marenisco), Michigan, but moved with his family to Merrill, Wisconsin, as a child. He was graduated from Merrill High School and went on to earn bachelor's degree from the University of Wisconsin–Oshkosh in 1966. He continued his education at the University of Wisconsin–Madison and earned his master's degree in political science in 1968.

== Career ==
While working on his master's degree in Madison, Whitburn became involved in Republican Party politics on the 1966 re-election campaign of Governor Warren P. Knowles. He subsequently worked on the Governor's staff in Madison and worked on his second re-election in 1968. After earning his master's degree, Whitburn moved to Washington, D.C., and worked as an aide to John Chafee, who was then United States Secretary of the Navy in the Nixon administration. In 1972, Chafee resigned to seek election to the United States Senate from Rhode Island, and hired Whitburn as his campaign director. Chafee ultimately lost the election to Democrat Claiborne Pell.

Following the defeat, Whitburn returned to Merrill, Wisconsin, and went to work at his father's Ford dealership as a partner, Whitburn Motor Co. While in Merrill, he became active with the legislative committee of the Wisconsin Chamber of Commerce in lobbying the Wisconsin Legislature. He also remained active in Wisconsin electoral politics, working on the unsuccessful 1978 gubernatorial campaign of Congressman Bob Kasten, and then joining Kasten's winning campaign for United States Senate in 1980.

After his election, Kasten appointed Whitburn as executive assistant on his Senate staff in Washington, D.C., where he served for the next six years.

Following the election of Tommy Thompson as Governor of Wisconsin in 1986, Whitburn returned to Wisconsin to accept an appointment as deputy secretary of the Wisconsin Department of Administration. In 1989, Thompson named Whitburn to the cabinet position of Secretary of the Wisconsin Department of Industry, Labor and Human Relations. Whitburn was appointed to replace John Coughlin, whose term at the agency was derided by state officials of both parties. Less than two years later, Whitburn was appointed Secretary of the Wisconsin Department of Health and Social Services.

As Secretary of Health and Social Services, Whitburn earned recognition for his experiments in Workfare programs as the Wisconsin Legislature voted to drop out of the federal Temporary Assistance for Needy Families program by 1999. In the Fall of 1994, Whitburn agreed to bring his experience to a new state as Secretary of Health and Human Services of Massachusetts, under Republican governor Bill Weld.

Whitburn was able to implement some welfare-to-work programs in Massachusetts, but became a controversial figure in Weld's administration. He resigned in June 1996 to accept a job at the Church Mutual Insurance Company in Merrill, Wisconsin. He later became chief executive officer and chairman of the Church Mutual Insurance Company and retired in 2009.

In 2011, Whitburn was appointed to the University of Wisconsin Board of Regents by Governor Scott Walker. He remained for nine years, resigning in 2020.

== Personal life ==
Gerald Whitburn married Charmaine M. Heise in 1969. Children, Bree Whitburn and Luke Whitburn

Government offices
Preceded by John T. Coughlin	Secretary of the Wisconsin Department of Industry, Labor and Human Relations; June 1989 – January 1991	Succeeded by Carol Skornicka
Preceded by Patricia A. Goodrich	Secretary of the Wisconsin Department of Health and Social Services; January 1991 – November 1994	Succeeded by Richard Loring (acting); Joseph Leean (confirmed)
Preceded by Charlie Baker	Secretary of Health and Human Services of Massachusetts; November 1994 – June 30, 1996	Succeeded by Joseph Gallant
