= Urban Assembly School for Law and Justice =

Public school in New York City

Urban Assembly School for Law & Justice

Location
- Brooklyn, New York City, United States
- 40°41′41″N 73°59′18″W

Information
- Type: College prep, law-centered
- Educational authority: New York City Panel for Educational Policy
- Principal: Merilee Valentino
- Faculty: 29
- Grades: 9-12
- Enrollment: 449 (2018)
- Language: English
- Affiliation: Urban Assembly
- Website: www.sljhs.org

The Urban Assembly School for Law & Justice, often shortened to SLJ, is a small law-themed college preparatory public high school in Brooklyn, New York City. It is one of a group of 21 high and middle schools operated by the Urban Assembly (a New York City non-profit organization), which do not require entrance examinations. The school is housed in a courthouse building near the Brooklyn Bridge.

SLJ was founded in 2004 with a $400,000 grant from the organization New Visions for Public Schools, and support from the Cravath, Swaine & Moore law firm. It continues to receive grants from organizations such as the Robin Hood Foundation. Its structure included a separate foundation, the Adams Street Foundation, "responsible for integrating pre-college enrichment and preparation for college and career into the school’s curriculum" through partnerships with various corporate, foundation and programmatic partners ranging from the Red Hook Community Justice Center to CBS News to the City University of New York.
