= BadgerCare =

Wisconsin public low-income healthcare coverage program

BadgerCare Plus, known informally as BadgerCare, is a public healthcare coverage program for low-income Wisconsin residents created by former governor Tommy Thompson and modified by former governor Jim Doyle. The Wisconsin Department of Health Services oversees the program's implementation.

== Origins ==
Before the implementation of the federally-funded State Children’s Health Insurance Program (SCHIP) initiative, Governor Tommy Thompson had wished to create a state-level family healthcare plan that used both Medicaid and SCHIP funds since his days in the state legislature.

BadgerCare was passed in the wake of the Clinton administration's social service overhaul (when Aid to Families with Dependent Children was replaced by Temporary Assistance for Needy Families) and launched in July 1999. The goal was to provide coverage to families with uninsured children who were transitioning from welfare to the workforce. The program's initial enrollment was 3,400 adolescents, but the total number of individuals covered by BadgerCare increased to 51,172 by November 2000.

Under the original conditions of BadgerCare, families could enroll if their net incomes were up to 185% of the federal poverty level (about $31,000 for a family of four in 2000) and could remain on BadgerCare as long as their incomes did not exceed 200% of the federal poverty level. Unlike Medicaid, a family applying for BadgerCare did not have to pass any sort of "asset test" to qualify.

== Doyle administration (2003-2011) ==
In 2006, the Democratic-controlled Wisconsin Senate passed a bill nicknamed the "Healthy Wisconsin proposal" that would have created a near-universal health care system in Wisconsin similar to the Massachusetts health care reform of 2006 implemented by then-governor Mitt Romney. Like the Massachusetts plan and the Affordable Care Act, the Healthy Wisconsin proposal would have mandated insurance coverage for any individual not on Medicare or BadgerCare. The proposed plan would not cover dental or eye care, long-term care, nor unnecessary cosmetic surgery. The plan was to have been paid for by a $15 billion payroll tax, making it incredibly unpopular among the Republican-controlled Wisconsin Assembly, and Democratic governor Jim Doyle.

=== Transition to BadgerCare+ ===
Since Governor Doyle opposed the Senate's mandate plan, he chose instead to expand BadgerCare, claiming that 98% of Wisconsinites would have some form of health insurance under his expansion. Doyle called the revised program BadgerCare+ and included it in his 2007-2009 biennial budget. BadgerCare+ began functioning on February 1, 2008.

According to a state document sent to healthcare providers in January 2008, BadgerCare+ expanded enrollment to:

- All uninsured children
- More pregnant women
- More parents and caretaker relatives
- Parents with children in foster care who are working to reunify their families
- Young adults exiting out-of-home care, such as foster care, because they have turned 18
- Certain farmers and other self-employed parents and caretaker relatives

The revised plan also covered tobacco cessation products such as nicotine gum.

=== Enrollment issues and BadgerCare+ Basic ===
The extremely high number of applications for the BadgerCare+ Core plan put undue stress on the program's budget, and Doyle suspended enrollments for that program in October 2009 with 21,000 individuals still on the waiting list. To assuage the thousands of Wisconsinites still seeking coverage, Doyle proposed an additional plan named BadgerCare+ Basic, targeted at childless adults. The income stipulations for BadgerCare+ Basic were $21,660 a year for a single childless individual and $29,140 for a childless couple. In contrast to Badgercare+ Core, coverage would be funded by a $130 premium to be paid by the policyholder, rather than taxpayers, and would cover up to 10 doctor visits, one inpatient hospital visit, five outpatient visits, and up to five emergency room visits in addition to some generic medications and discounts on other drugs. Signing the BadgerCare+ Basic bill into law in May 2010 was one of Doyle's last major acts as governor, as he did not seek re-election in the 2010 Wisconsin gubernatorial election.

== Walker and Evers administrations (2011-) ==
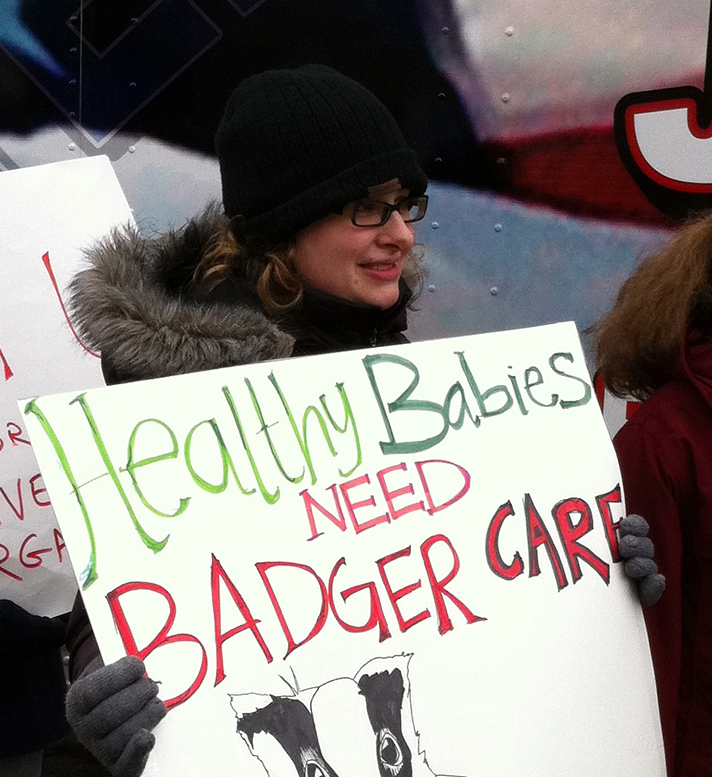
Protester demonstrating against Governor Scott Walker's cuts to BadgerCare program during the 2011 Wisconsin protests

Soon after taking office in 2011, Governor Scott Walker began pursuing large funding cuts to BadgerCare as a government deficit reduction measure.

In 2013, Governor Scott Walker rejected federal money that would have been made available under the Affordable Care Act, and 92,000 people were told that their health insurance through BadgerCare Plus would end and that they would consequentially be required to buy potentially more costly commercial health coverage under the Affordable Care Act's individual mandate.

After taking office in 2019, Governor Tony Evers began pushing to expand BadgerCare Plus by about 76,000 participants, which Republican opponents argued would "shift costs to the private sector."
