= Raymond Omernick =

American politician

Raymond Omernick (1923–2007) was a member of the Wisconsin State Assembly.

== Biography ==
Omernick was born on May 24, 1923, in Franzen, Wisconsin. He was a farmer and logger. He married Victoria Zoromski on October 13, 1953, at St. Mary's Catholic Church in Torun, Wisconsin. They would reside in Wittenberg, Wisconsin, and have five children.

Omernick died on August 22, 2007, in an automobile accident. He is buried in Rosholt, Wisconsin.

== Career ==
Omernick was elected to the Assembly in 1978, defeating incumbent Laurence J. Day. He was defeated for re-election in the Republican primary in 1980 by John L. McEwen and in the general election as a write-in candidate. Previously, he had been a municipal judge from 1977 to 1979.
