= Dennis G. Smith =

American public health administrator

2nd Secretary of the Wisconsin Department of Health Services
- In office January 2011 – February 2013
- Governor: Scott Walker
- Preceded by: Karen Timberlake
- Succeeded by: Kitty Rhoades

Personal details
- Spouse: married
- Children: 4
- Education: Illinois State University (B.S.); George Mason University (M.P.A.)

Dennis G. Smith is an American government administrator and health policy advisor. He served as director of the Centers for Medicaid and State Operations in the U.S. Department of Health and Human Services from 2001 to 2008, in the administration of U.S. President George W. Bush. He later served as secretary of the Wisconsin Department of Health Services under Governor Scott Walker. His tenure in Wisconsin ended in controversy after he was accused of hiring a friend as the Department's top lawyer and then pursuing a sexual relationship with her, leading to attempted murder charges against her husband. Smith also worked as a visiting fellow to The Heritage Foundation; he has been an outspoken opponent of Medicaid, and advocated for states to drop out of the federal program.

== Biography ==
Dennis Smith earned his bachelor's degree in political science from Illinois State University in 1978. He later pursued graduate school at George Mason University, earning his M.P.A. in 1990.

Near the start of the Bush administration, in 2001, Smith was appointed director of the Center for Medicaid and State Operations, in the U.S. Department of Health and Human Services; the secretary of the Department of Health and Human Services at the time was former Wisconsin governor Tommy Thompson. Almost immediately after starting at HHS, Smith became the focal point of an early controversy in the Bush administration when he was the author of a memo to state health officials defining unborn fetuses as persons qualifying for medical coverage under the Children's Health Insurance Program. Smith served in this role for nearly the entire Bush administration, leaving office in the Spring of 2008.

After the Bush administration, Smith worked as a visiting fellow at The Heritage Foundation, where he co-authored a report urging states to drop out of Medicaid.

After Scott Walker was elected governor of Wisconsin, he named Smith as his choice to head the Wisconsin Department of Health Services. In his role in Wisconsin, Smith led the state's efforts to oppose the Medicaid expansion funding from the Affordable Care Act. In one of his first acts as governor, Walker signed a law removing civil service requirements from a number of state position, including 14 executive department general counsels. This change allowed Smith to select childhood friend Mary Spear as chief legal counsel for the Department of Health Services in January 2012. Within months, Spear and Smith began an extramarital affair, which ultimately led to Spear's husband being charged with her attempted murder in August 2012. At the time, Spear and Smith denied the affair and resisted open records requests from the Wisconsin State Journal and the Milwaukee Journal Sentinel. Several emails were eventually revealed due to discovery obligations in Spear's husband's criminal trial. Spear's husband ultimately pled guilty to lesser charges.

Smith resigned from the Department of Health Services in February 2013 to accept a job as a health policy advisor to Washington, D.C., law firm McKenna Long & Aldridge. He subsequently worked for Dentons, and then became a visiting professor at the University of Arkansas for Medical Sciences and worked as a senior advisor for Medicaid and Health Care Reform at the Arkansas Department of Health Services.

Government offices
Preceded by Karen Timberlake	Secretary of the Wisconsin Department of Health Services; January 2011 – February 2013	Succeeded by Kitty Rhoades
