= John L. McEwen =

American politician

John Leroy "Jack" McEwen (June 19, 1928 – March 25, 2010) was a former member of the Wisconsin State Assembly.

== Biography ==
McEwen was born on June 19, 1928, in Wausau, Wisconsin. After graduating from Wausau Senior High School, he attended Northwestern University and the University of Wisconsin–Madison. During World War II and the Korean War, McEwen served in the United States Navy. He had been a commander of the Veterans of Foreign Wars and the American Legion, as well as a grand knight of the Knights of Columbus. McEwen was married with three children. He died on March 25, 2010, in Wausau, Wisconsin.

== Political career ==
McEwen was first elected to the Assembly in 1980. He had defeated incumbent Raymond Omernick in the Republican primary. In 1990, McEwen was a candidate for the United States House of Representatives from Wisconsin's 7th congressional district. He lost to incumbent Dave Obey.
