= Wisconsin Department of Health Services =

Wisconsin State Agency for health services

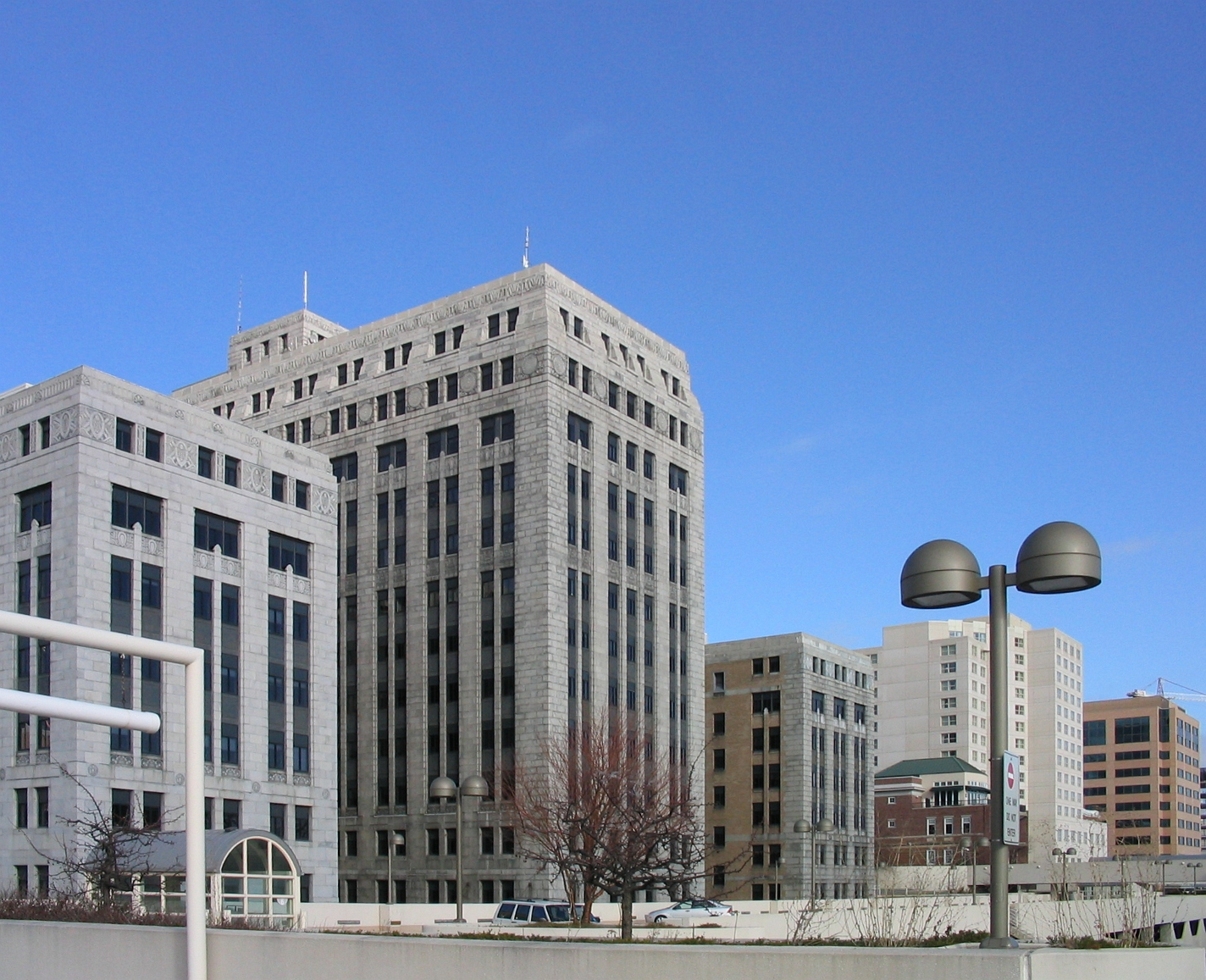
- Madison's State Office Building is the headquarters of the Department of Health Services

Agency overview
- Formed: July 1, 2008; 18 years ago
- Preceding agencies: Wisconsin Department of Public Welfare (1939–1967); Wisconsin Department of Health and Social Services (1967–1996); Wisconsin Department of Health and Family Services (1996–2008)
- Headquarters: State Office Building 1 W. Wilson St. Madison, Wisconsin, U.S. 43°4′18.048″N 89°22′54.372″W
- Employees: 6,341.92 (2023)
- Annual budget: $30,163,074,200 (2023)
- Agency executives: Kirsten Johnson, Secretary; Deb Standridge, Deputy Secretary; Sarah Valencia, Assistant Secretary
- Website: Agency website

The Wisconsin Department of Health Services (WisDHS) is a governmental agency of the U.S. state of Wisconsin responsible for maintaining public health. It administers a wide range of services in the state and at state institutions, regulates hospitals and care providers, and supervises and consults with local public health agencies. Its responsibilities include public health; mental health and substance abuse; long-term support and care; services to people with disabilities, medical assistance, and children's services; aging programs; physical and developmental disability services; blindness disability programs; operation of care and treatment facilities; quality assurance programs; nutrition supplementation programs; medical assistance; and health care for low-income families, elderly, and disabled people.

It has primary responsibility for administering Medicaid and Medicare within the state. The DHS secretary is a cabinet member appointed by the Governor of Wisconsin and confirmed by the Wisconsin Senate. The current secretary-designee is Kirsten Johnson, appointed by Governor Tony Evers in February 2023.

The Wisconsin DHS is made up of three executive offices and five divisions organized according to function. WisDHS's main office is located in Madison, and it maintains regional offices throughout the state.

== History ==
The Department of Health Services combines administration and supervision of many state and local functions that had developed separately in the 1800s. In the early days of statehood, public health was primarily a function of local governments. For more than two decades after statehood, Wisconsin created separate governing boards and institutions for the care of prisoners; juveniles; and blind, deaf, and mentally ill persons. By 1871, there were six such institutions. The first attempt to institute overall state supervision of these services came in 1871 when the legislature created the State Board of Charities and Reform. Its duties included examination of the operations of state institutions and their boards and investigation of practices in local asylums, jails, and schools for the blind and deaf.

In 1876, the legislature established the State Board of Health to "study the vital statistics of this state, and endeavor to make intelligent and profitable use of the collected records of death and sickness among the people.” The board was directed to “make sanitary investigations and inquiries respecting the causes of disease, and especially of epidemics; the causes of mortality, and the effects of localities, employments, conditions, ingesta, habits and circumstances on the health of the people." This directive still defines much of the work done in public health by the department. Later legislation required the board to take responsibility for tuberculosis care (1905), preventing blindness in infants (1909), and to inspecting water and sewerage systems to prevent typhoid and dysentery (1919). In addition, the agency then licensed restaurants, health facilities, barbers, funeral directors and embalmers.

When the federal government entered the field of public welfare during the Great Depression of the 1930s, Wisconsin had already pioneered a number of programs, including aid to children and pensions for the elderly (enacted in 1931). The Wisconsin Children's Code, enacted in 1929, was considered one of the most comprehensive in the nation. The state's initial response to the new federal funding was to establish separate departments to administer social security funds and other public welfare programs.

After several attempts at reorganization, the legislature established the Department of Public Welfare in 1939, to provide unified administration of all existing welfare functions. Public health and care for the aged were delegated to separate agencies. The executive branch reorganization act of 1967 created the Department of Health and Social Services. In addition to combining public welfare, public health, and care for the aged the Legislature added the Division of Vocational Rehabilitation. The 1960s and 1970s saw an expansion of public welfare and health services at both the federal and state levels. Notable were programs for medical care for the needy and aged (Medical Assistance and Medicare), drug treatment programs, food stamps, Aid to Families with Dependent Children Program (AFDC), and increased regulation of nursing homes and hospitals.

=== Rename and spin-off ===
The Department of Health and Social Services was renamed the Department of Health and Family Services (DHFS), on July 1, 1996. In 2008, various programs of the DHFS were combined with others from the Wisconsin Department of Workforce Development, to create a new Wisconsin Department of Children and Families. The remaining health-specific programs were left under a renamed Department of Health Services.

== Wisconsin DHS Divisions ==
- Division of Enterprise Services
- Division of Medicaid Services
- Division of Care and Treatment Services
- Division of Public Health
- Division of Quality Assurance
- Office of the Inspector General
- Office of Legal Counsel
- Office of Policy Initiatives and Budget
- Office of the Secretary

== Secretaries ==
=== Department of Health and Social Services ===
Order	Name	Took office	Left office	Governor
1	Wilbur J. Schmidt	1967	1975	Warren P. Knowles; Patrick Lucey
2	Manuel Carballo	1975	1977	Patrick Lucey
3	Donald Percy	1977	1983	Martin J. Schreiber; Lee S. Dreyfus
4	Linda Reivitz	1983	1987	Tony Earl
5	Timothy Cullen	1987	1988	Tommy Thompson
6	Patricia A. Goodrich	1988	1991	Tommy Thompson
7	Gerald Whitburn	1991	1994	Tommy Thompson
(acting)	Richard Loring	1994	1995	Tommy Thompson

=== Department of Health and Family Services ===
Order	Name	Took office	Left office	Governor
1	Joseph Leean	1995	2001	Tommy Thompson; Scott McCallum
2	Phyllis Dube	2001	2003	Scott McCallum
3	Helene Nelson	2003	2006	Jim Doyle
4	Kevin R. Hayden	2007	2008	Jim Doyle

=== Department of Health Services ===
Order	Name	Took office	Left office	Governor
1	Karen Timberlake	2008	2011	Jim Doyle
2	Dennis G. Smith	2011	2013	Scott Walker
3	Kitty Rhoades	2013	2016	Scott Walker
4	Linda Seemeyer	2016	2019	Scott Walker
5	Andrea Palm	2019	2021	Tony Evers
6	Karen Timberlake	2021	2023	Tony Evers
7	Kirsten Johnson	2023	present	Tony Evers

== Notable people ==
- Jasmine Zapata, chief medical officer and state epidemiologist for community health
- Andrea Palm, Secretary-designate of the Wisconsin Department of Health Services prior to her appointment as U.S. Deputy Secretary of Health and Human Services
