= Office of Global Regulatory Operations and Policy =

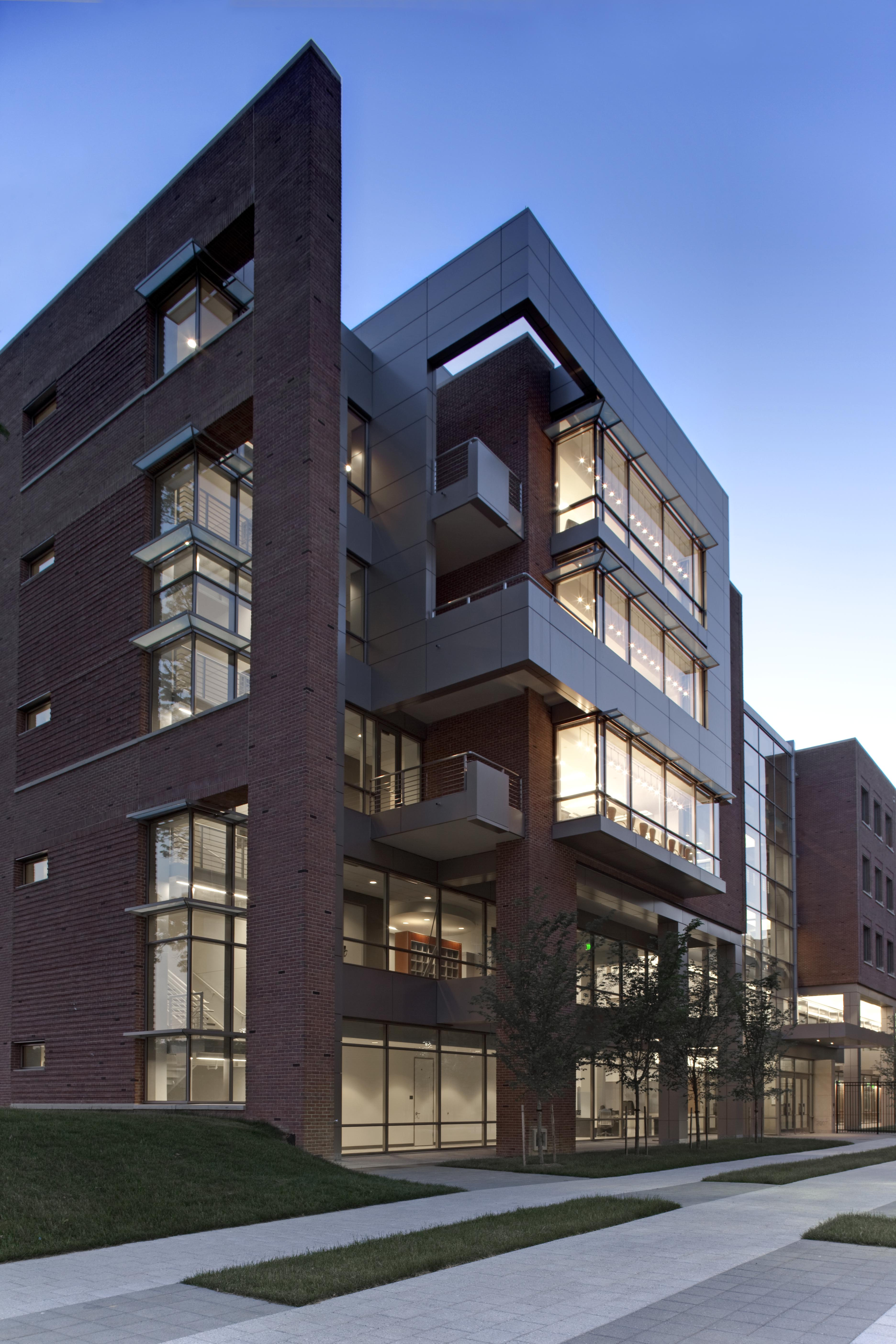
FDA Building 32 houses the Office of the Commissioner and the Office of Regulatory Affairs.

The Office of Global Regulatory Operations and Policy (GO), also known as the Office of Regulatory Affairs (ORA), is the part of the U.S. Food and Drug Administration (FDA) enforcing the federal laws governing biologics, cosmetics, dietary supplements, drugs, food, medical devices, radiation-emitting electronic devices, tobacco products, and veterinary medicine products which may have potentially harmful side effects for the consumer.

The FDA Office of Regulatory Affairs is responsible for the enforcement of federal legislation and serves in a regulatory capacity to ensure health related products are accurately and informatively represented to the public, effective, and safe.

The Office of Regulatory Affairs has legislative and regulatory authority for the specified health related products:

- Biologics
- Cosmetics
- Dietary Supplements
- Drugs
- Foods
- Medical Devices
- Radiation-Emitting Electronic Products
- Tobacco Products
- Veterinary Products

== Organization ==
It is organized into five regions - Northeast (NER), Central (CER), Southeast (SER), Southwest (SWR) and Pacific (PAR). Each region is structured into district and resident post offices. There are a total of 20 district offices, nineteen of which handle both imported and domestic products and one import only district (Southwest Import, referred to as "SWID"). Districts, with the exception of the Southwest Imports District (SWID), are referred to by a three letter name followed by "DO", such as MIN-DO for Minneapolis District.

Each district office consists of three branches reporting to a district director. The majority of the staff are part of an Investigations Branch that performs routine inspections of manufacturers and imported products, issuance of the FDA 483, complaint investigations, audits of recalls, collections of samples, and other related tasks. These staff are mostly Consumer Safety Officers (CSOs, "Investigators") or Consumer Safety Inspectors (CSIs, "Inspectors"). ORA no longer routinely hire CSIs, most new staff are CSOs. These staff have a variety of administrative authorities and enforce the civil law requirements of the Food, Drug, and Cosmetic Act as well as parts of the Public Health Service Act. Some are also commissioned officers of the Public Health Service, but this does not generally affect day-to-day duties. These staff are generally technical or scientific and are not involved in criminal law enforcement which is handled by a separate branch of FDA called OCI, though many criminal investigations are started by ORA referring a case to OCI.

The district offices also include a Compliance Branch. Compliance Officers handle the administrative authorities used in inspections, such as issuing Warning Letters. They also organize civil litigation (such as a seizure or injunction) which is brought to the courts by the United States District Attorneys.

The final branch is an Administrative Branch which handles budgeting, some aspects of payroll, and other administrative tasks. Regional and national regulatory experts are often located at district offices, but are not administratively part of those offices.

The districts also include resident posts, typically in major cities or at major border crossings. These are generally only Investigations Branch staff.

The Office of Regulatory Affairs operates thirteen field laboratories. The field science laboratories were historically part of the FDA districts infrastructure but are now independent entities. ORA has five regional, six district, and two specialty laboratories such as the Forensic Chemistry Center (FCC) and the Winchester Engineering and Analytical Center (WEAC).

ORA operations are generally conducted according to the Compliance Program Guidance Manual (CPGM), Investigations Operations Manual (IOM), and the Regulatory Procedures Manual (RPM).
