= Open Food Facts =

Open wiki to catalog food, nutrition facts and ingredients

- Logo since 2022

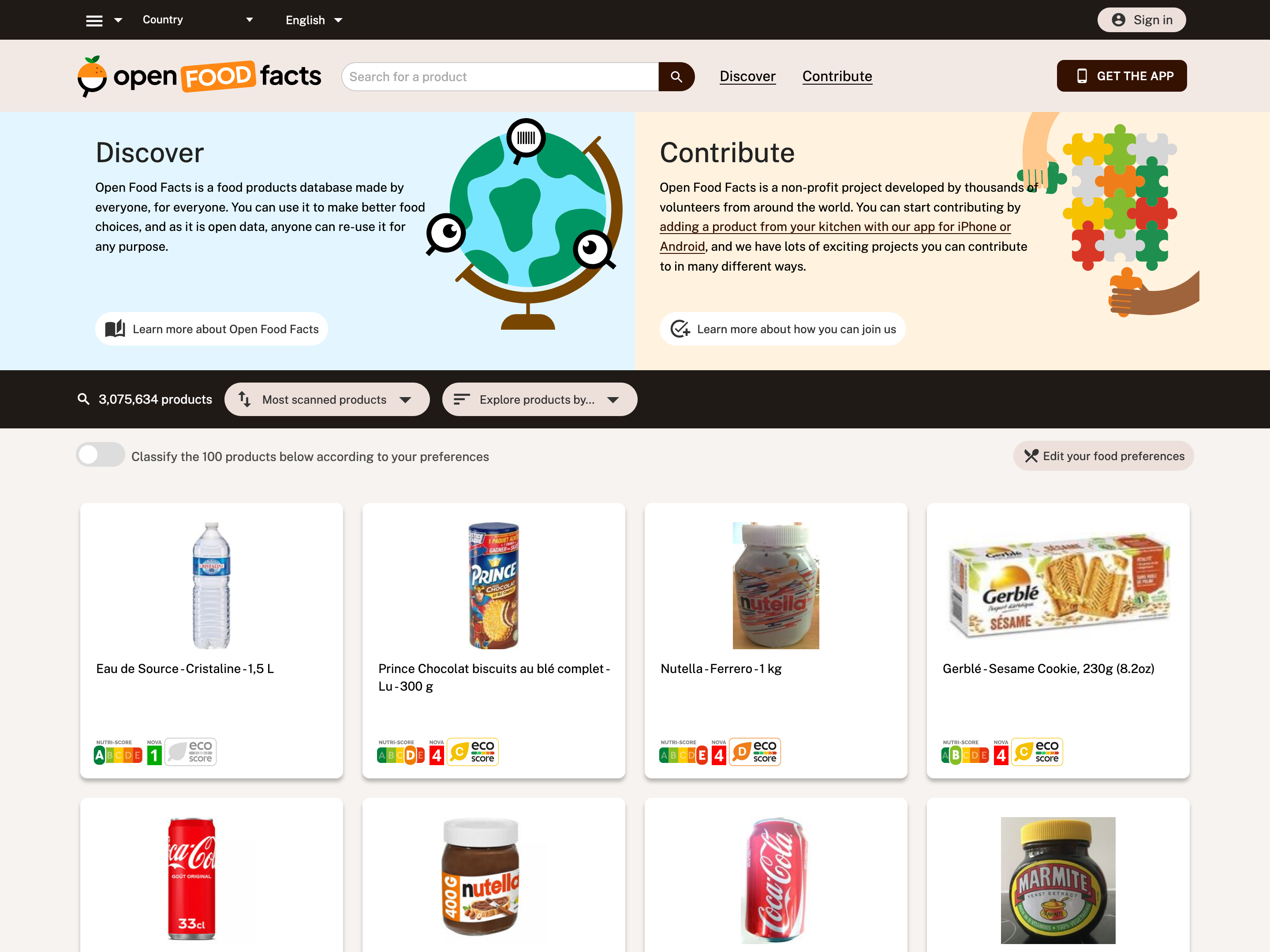
- Website type: Collaborative database
- Available in: Multilingual
- Website: openfoodfacts.org
- Commercial: No
- Registration: Optional, but is required to contribute from web
- Launched: May 19, 2012; 14 years ago
- Current status: Active
- Content license: Open Database Licence; Database Contents License; Creative Commons Attribution/Share-Alike 3.0 (product pictures)
- Written in: Perl (Web); Kotlin (Android); Swift (iOS)

Open Food Facts is a free, online and crowdsourced database of food products from around the world. The project compiles global food-product data, including product name, quantity, packaging, brand, category, production/processing locations, countries and retailers where sold, ingredient lists and trace allergens, additives, and nutritional information; Nutri-Score is used to calculate nutritional value.

== History ==
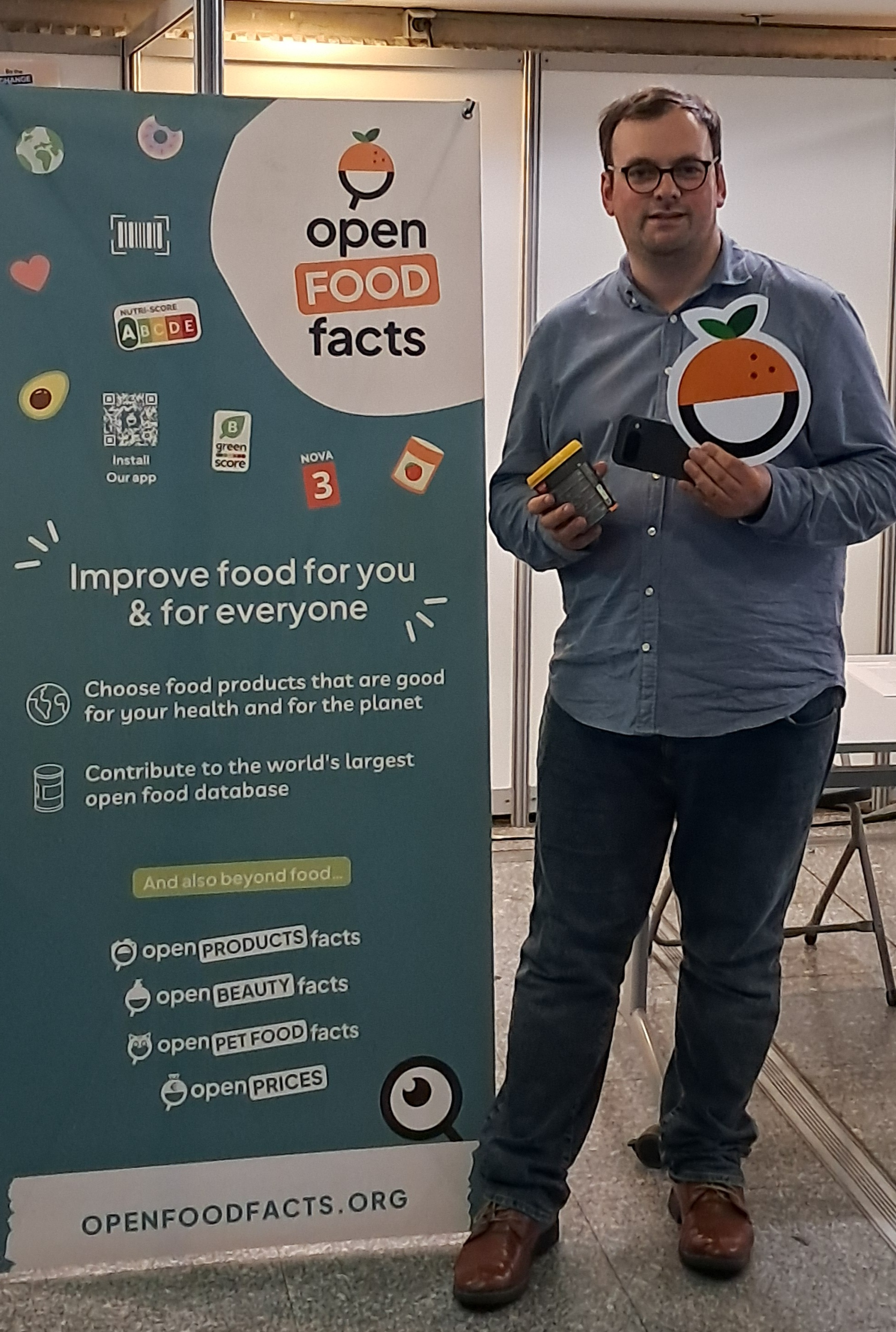
Pierre Slamich, cofounder, in 2026

The project was launched on 19 May 2012 by French programmer Stéphane Gigandet during the Food Revolution Day organized by Jamie Oliver and has won the 2013 Dataconnexions Award from Etalab and the 2015 OKFN Award from Open Knowledge.

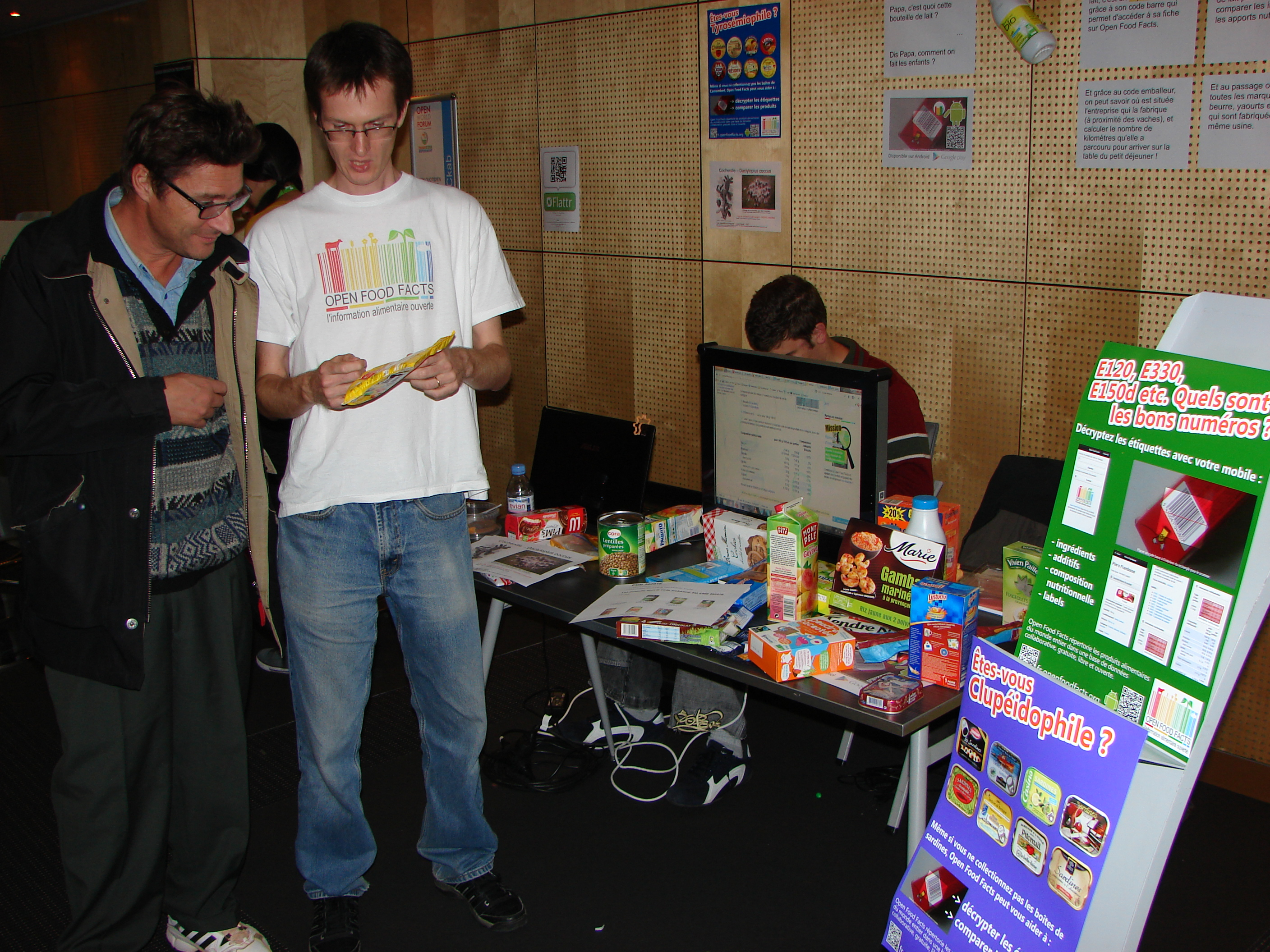
Stéphane Gigandet presenting the project in October 2012 at the Open World Forum

In May 2016, its database contained more than 80,000 products from 141 countries. In June 2017, due to the growing ecosystem of apps and open data imports from various countries, this number rose to 880,000. In October 2019 OFF passed the 1,000,000 products milestone. By the 10th anniversary in May 2022, the database contained 2.3 million products from 182 countries. As of 2025, OFF has passed 4 million products.

In 2024 Open Food Facts was officially recognized as a Digital Public Good.

== Community ==
Each contributor can add or edit food items based on the information explicitly shown on the package. As a result, the Global Trade Item Number embedded in the barcode on the packaging of the product (when available) is generally used as the identifier.

Mobile phone applications allow for capturing photos and information that are reprocessed manually by volunteers. OFF licensed under the Open Database License, while its artwork, uploaded by contributors, is distributed under a Creative Commons Attribution–Share Alike license. Due to similar mechanisms for modification, extension, or deletion of content and structure, the project is sometimes compared to Wikipedia in the media.

== Other projects ==
=== Open Food Fact Days ===
The Open Food Facts Days is an annual event where contributors can brainstorm. There are also a number of workshops.

=== Open Beauty Facts ===
Launched in 2014, concerning beauty products. As of June 2025, the database contains more than 62,000 products.

=== Open Pet Food Facts ===
On April 1, 2017, the project Open Pet Food Facts was launched with the goal of replacing Open Food Facts. The April Fool's Day joke finally became the 3rd project after Open Beauty Facts. As of June 2025, the database contained more than 13,000 products.

=== Open Products Facts ===
On April 1, 2018, the project Open Products Facts was launched with the objective of being the start of the database of everything. The April Fool's Day joke finally became the 4th project after Open Pet Food Facts. The database collects all products that do not belong to Open Food Facts, Open Beauty Facts or Open Pet Food Facts. The project was then reoriented to allow more circular consumption choices, and extend the life of everyday objects.

=== Open Prices ===
Open Prices is a crowdsourced dataset of prices. As of August 2025, more than 125,000 prices have been added.

== Funding ==
Financing Open Food Facts is strictly independent from the agri-food industry. The financing model relies on grants and patronage, as well as donations from the public. Open Food Facts also benefits from the support of Santé publique France for its health role on the Nutri-Score, from the European Commission via the NLNet program for open-source and from the philanthropic branch of Google, Google.org, for its impact on the environment. Other partners and supporters include the Afnic, Mozilla, Perl, Free and OVH foundations.

In April 2021, Open Food Facts received a grant of 1.1 million euros as well as the volunteer support of 10 Google employees for a period of 6 months for the development of the new mobile application as well as the calculation of the Eco-score thanks to Machine Learning.

== Comparison of Open Food Facts and OpenFDA ==
Open Food Facts and OpenFDA are two initiatives that provide access to food-related data, though they differ in scope and origin. Open Food Facts is a community-driven open database that compiles information on food products from around the world, including ingredients, nutritional information, and allergens. In contrast, OpenFDA is an initiative by the U.S. Food and Drug Administration designed to make regulatory data about food, drugs, and medical devices available to the public through APIs.
Both platforms facilitate data access for developers, researchers, and the public but differ in their data focus and governance, with Open Food Facts being community-driven and international, while OpenFDA is a government-managed resource primarily focused on U.S.-based regulatory data.

== See also ==
- Farm-to-table
- Information activism
- Right to know
