= FDA warning letter =

US government message type

An FDA warning letter is an official message from the United States Food and Drug Administration (FDA) to a manufacturer or other organization that has violated some rule in a federally regulated activity.

The FDA defines an FDA warning letter as:

... a correspondence that notifies regulated industry about violations that FDA has documented during its inspections or investigations. Typically, a Warning Letter notifies a responsible individual or firm that the Agency considers one or more products, practices, processes, or other activities to be in violation of the Federal Food, Drug, and Cosmetic Act (the Act), its implementing regulations and other federal statutes. Warning Letters should only be issued for violations of regulatory significance, i.e., those that may actually lead to an enforcement action if the documented violations are not promptly and adequately corrected. A Warning Letter is one of the Agency's principal means of achieving prompt voluntary compliance with the Act.

While the FDA generally determines violations through its own inspections, they can also issue one based on evidence from state personnel. The FDA considers a warning letter informal and advisory. It communicates the agency's position on a matter, but does not commit the FDA to an enforcement action. For that reason, the FDA does not consider a warning letter a final action on which it can be sued.

The FDA expects most individuals, firms, and government establishments to voluntarily comply with the law. When the FDA observes a deviation from acceptable practice, they give the organization an opportunity to take voluntary and prompt corrective action before initiating an enforcement action. A step in this process, depending on the nature of the violation, is to issue a warning letter, which also establishes prior notice.

The agency has a computer application called the Compliance Management System (CMS, or MARC-CMS) that district offices use to electronically submit warning letter recommendations to FDA Centers. All district office must use the CMS to submit the warning letter recommendation, the Form FDA 483 that supports the alleged violations, the Establishment Inspection Report (EIR), and any written response from the firm.

== Contents ==
The elements listed below are common to warning letters:

=== Title ===
The warning letter must have the words "WARNING LETTER" at the top.

=== Delivery ===
The warning letter is sent in a way that ensures overnight delivery and receipt (e.g., return receipt requested, FedEx) is documented. The delivery mode is stated on the Warning Letter.

=== Addressees ===
The FDA addresses the warning letter to the highest known official in the firm that owns the inspected facility, and sends a copy to the highest known official at the specific inspected facility. If the FDA expects a separate response from other officials, they may included their addressees. Districts routinely provide copies of warning letters to appropriate state agencies using suitable notations (e.g., cc, or copy sent to) in the letter, and identifying each person by name, title, and, if appropriate, address.

=== Inspection details ===
The warning letter includes the inspection dates and a description of the violating condition, practice, or product in brief but sufficient detail to provide the respondent the opportunity to correct the matter. It cites the section of the law and, where applicable, the regulation violated. Unlike the Form FDA 483, the warning letter cites regulatory references for each violation.

=== Promised corrections ===
The warning letter acknowledges corrections promised during the inspection, or that the organization provides to the district in a written response.

=== Response request ===
The Warning Letter requests corrections and a written response within a specific period after receipt of the letter—usually fifteen working days. The district, at its discretion, may offer the recipient an opportunity to discuss the letter with district officials or, when appropriate, with center officials.

=== Warning statement ===
The Warning Letter includes a statement that warns that failure to promptly correct the matter may result in an FDA enforcement action without further notice. It may include examples of such actions, but makes no commitment that the FDA will take these actions.

=== Impact ===
A drug warning letter (except those issued to institutional review boards (IRBs), clinical investigators, sponsors, and clinical trial monitors) includes a statement of implications for the award of federal contracts. If current good manufacturing practice (cGMP) violations are cited, it adds a statement regarding the potential impact on requests for approval of export certificates and drug applications.

Device Warning Letters (except those issued to IRBs, clinical investigators, sponsors, and monitors involved in clinical trials) include the notice, "Federal agencies are advised of all Warning Letters about devices so that they may take this information into account when considering the award of contracts."

Warning letters that include cGMP violations include the statement:

Additionally, premarket approval applications for Class III devices to which the Quality System regulation deviations are reasonably related will not be approved until the violations have been corrected. Requests for Certificates to Foreign Governments will not be granted until the violations related to the subject devices have been corrected.

=== Response instructions ===
The Warning Letter provides instructions, as appropriate, stating that the organization's response must include:

1. "each step that has been or will be taken to completely correct the current violations and to prevent similar violations;
2. the time within which correction will be completed;
3. any reason the corrective action has not been completed within the response time; and,
4. any documentation necessary to show that correction has been achieved."

=== Response recipient identification ===
The Warning Letter specifies a designated district or center official to whom the organization must address their response.

=== Issuer ===
The Warning Letter identifies the entity that issued it—the district director, division director, or higher agency official.

=== Standardized closing text ===
For drug Warning Letters, the information in the above sections 1.6-1.8 and 1.10 is in closing paragraphs as follows (bold type indicates optional/alternative language to be used as appropriate):

The violations cited in this letter are not intended to be an all-inclusive statement of violations that exist [at your facility/in connection with your product(s)]. You are responsible for investigating and determining the causes of the violations identified above and for preventing their recurrence or the occurrence of other violations. It is your responsibility to assure that [you/your firm] comply[ies] with all requirements of federal law and FDA regulations.

You should take prompt action to correct the violations cited in this letter. Failure to promptly correct these violations may result in legal action without further notice, including, without limitation, seizure and injunction. Other federal agencies may take this Warning Letter into account when considering the award of contracts. [If cGMP VIOLATIONS ARE CITED: Additionally, FDA may withhold approval of requests for export certificates, or approval of pending new drug applications listing your facility as a [supplier or manufacturer] until the above violations are corrected. A reinspection may be necessary.]

"Within fifteen working days of receipt of this letter, please notify this office in writing of the specific steps that you have taken to correct violations. Include an explanation of each step being taken to prevent the recurrence of violations, as well as copies of related documentation. If you cannot complete corrective action within fifteen working days, state the reason for the delay and the time within which you will complete the correction. [If you no longer manufacture or market ____, your response should so indicate, including the reasons that, and the date on which, you ceased production.]"

== Criteria preventing issuance ==
Ongoing or promised corrective actions generally do not prevent the FDA from issuing a warning letter, though a written promise to take prompt corrective action, in the right context, can result in them deciding not to issue one. Potentially influencing factors include:

- "The firm's compliance history, e.g., a history of serious violations, or failure to prevent the recurrence of violations;
- "The nature of the violation, e.g., a violation that the firm was aware of (was evident or discovered) but failed to correct;
- "The risk associated with the product and the impact of the violations on such risk;
- "The overall adequacy of the firm's corrective action and whether the corrective action addresses the specific violations, related violations, related products or facilities, and contains provisions for monitoring and review to ensure effectiveness and prevent recurrence;
- "Whether documentation of the corrective action was provided to enable the agency to undertake an informed evaluation;
- "Whether the timeframe for the corrective action is appropriate and whether actual progress has been made in accordance with the timeframe; and,
- "Whether the corrective action taken ensures sustained compliance with the law or regulations. In the case of Warning Letters being considered for products offered for sale through internet web sites, corrective action to remove claims or inactivate the website is easily reversible, and should be carefully considered, along with the other factors above, in determining whether or not to issue a Warning Letter. Warning Letters for, or involving, internet web sites should be issued in as close proximity as possible to the time when the claims were last observed, and reference to the date on which the claims were observed should be included in the letter."

Also, the agency usually does not issue a Warning Letter if they find the organization has implemented actions that corrected the violations that would have supported the Warning Letter.

District offices do not recommend a Warning Letter as a follow-up to a preapproval inspection (PAI) for pending drug or device applications (ANDAs, NDAs, BLAs) if the firm markets no other FDA-regulated products. If the firm markets other FDA-regulated products and the issue(s) affect marketed products—or the inspection extended to marketed products included on the FDA 483, then they may issue a Warning Letter These include the following statement: "Due to the deficiencies listed on the attached FDA 483 we are recommending to the center that approval of the _____ application be withheld."

== Center review ==
Warning letters with the following violations must be reviewed by their respective FDA Center (e.g., CDER):

1. "All labeling violations - except where specific guidance has been provided, e.g., Compliance Programs, Compliance Policy Guides, and Drug Health Fraud Bulletins;
2. Computer application and software violations;
3. Bioresearch Monitoring Program violations; and
4. Product advertising violations."

CDER requires their review for additional types of violations, which are:

1. "New drug charges - including unapproved changes in processes or formulations and recommendations to withhold approvals of applications or supplements;
2. Adverse drug experience reporting violations;
3. Novel and unusual tamper-evident packaging violations;
4. Prescription Drug Marketing Act violations;
5. Investigational drug use violations;
6. CGMP charges involving active pharmaceutical ingredients and other drug component manufacturing deficiencies;
7. CGMP charges involving all dosage forms, including medical gases;
8. CGMP charges involving inspections of facilities for therapeutic biologic products regulated by CDER; and
9. Pharmacy compounding issues."

CBER requires their review if these violations are being reported:

1. "Donor re-entry violations (e.g., HBsAg, anti-HIV-1);
2. [Certain] Violations relating to drug CGMP ... ;
3. Violative inspections of federal government agencies;
4. Violative inspections of Team Biologics (Core Team) facilities for biologic products regulated by CBER;
5. [Certain] Viral marker test run deficiencies ... ;
6. [Certain] Violations in areas where specific guidance has not been provided ... ;
7. Violations relating to HIV and HCV lookback; and
8. Violative inspections of manufacturers of human cell, tissue, and cellular and tissue-based products (HCT/Ps)."

Refer to the FDA's Regulatory Procedures Manual, section 4-1 - "WARNING LETTERS" for details on the above criteria, and for additional criteria pertaining to these Centers: CDRH, CVM, and CFSAN.

=== Lead center ===
When the issues in a Warning Letter require review by more than one center, the agency designates a lead center. The lead center is responsible for communication with other involved centers, the district, and the FDA's Office of Chief Counsel (OCC). The lead center is responsible for bringing the Warning Letter through the review process, including the review and incorporation of comments as appropriate from the other involved entities.

== OCC review ==
Deputy Secretary of the Department of Health and Human Services directed on November 29, 2001, that the FDA submit all Warning Letters to the OCC before they issue them so the OCC can review them for legal sufficiency and consistency with Agency policy. The OCC has 15 working days to complete its review. If the OCC fails to make a timely response to Direct Reference Warning Letters and those issued as a result of foreign inspections, the District or Center may presume concurrence and send the Warning Letter out without additional OCC input.

== Follow up inspections ==
For a CBER warning letter, the agency schedules a follow-up inspection for approximately 30 days after they receive the warning letter response to determine the adequacy of reported corrective actions. If the firm has made no corrective action or has failed to respond, the district considers suitable follow-up.

During subsequent inspection, FDA investigators must verify overall completeness and effectiveness of corrective actions. The timing of a subsequent investigation can be expedited or routine, as determined by the issuing office. Should violations be observed during a subsequent inspection or through other means, enforcement action(s) may be taken without further notice. Additional enforcement actions (sequential or concurrent) available to the FDA to achieve correction are product recall, seizure, injunction, administrative detention, civil money penalties or prosecution.

== Special types ==
=== Joint ===
The FDA and the Federal Trade Commission issued their first joint Warning Letter on October 15, 2009, to a web site that was marketing fraudulent supplements.

=== Cyber ===
"Cyber" Warning Letters are sent electronically to companies or web sites advertising unapproved prescription drugs. These letters warn that the company may be engaged in illegal marketing, and describe laws governing prescription drug sales.

== Alternatives ==
There is no legal requirement that the FDA warn individuals or firms that they are violating a law before taking enforcement action, so a warning letter is not a required prerequisite to enforcement action. The FDA further asserts that there are egregious circumstances when issuing a Warning Letter is not appropriate, and it will then take immediate enforcement action. These include:

1. The violation reflects a pattern of conduct of a substantially similar nature during which time the individual and/or firm has been notified of violation;
2. The violation is intentional or flagrant;
3. The violation presents a reasonable possibility of injury or death;
4. The violations are intentional and willful acts that once having occurred cannot be retracted. Also, such a felony violation does not require prior notice. Therefore, Title 18 U.S.C. 1001 violations are not suitable for inclusion in Warning Letters; and,
5. When adequate notice has been given by other means and the violations have not been corrected, or are continuing.

In certain situations, the agency may take other actions instead of, or concurrent with, a Warning Letter. For example:

1. The product is adulterated under Section 402(a)(3) or 402(a)(4) of the Act;
2. There is a violation of cGMP;
3. The product contains illegal pesticide residues; or
4. The product shows short contents, subpotency, or superpotency.

== Close-out letter ==
After the FDA completes an evaluation of corrective actions by a company in violation, it may issue a close-out letter if the FDA's evaluation shows that the firm has corrected the problems described in the warning letter. The corrective actions are verified by FDA, typically by a follow-up inspection to assure the corrections are sufficient and sustainable. If violations are discovered during the subsequent assessment, the FDA may undertake enforcement and impose penalties without further notice.

== Public access ==
Warning letters are available under the Freedom of Information (FOI) Office. Published letters are redacted or edited to remove confidential information. Redacted copies do not include "bcc" information, or the "credit page" related to drafting sequence, etc.

It is important that third parties reading Warning Letters understand that matters that FDA Warning Letters describe may have been subject to subsequent interaction between the FDA and the recipient that may have changed the regulatory status of the issues discussed. (See the "External links" section below for electronic access to Warning Letters.)

The Freedom of Information Act (FOIA) requires that publicly accessible "electronic reading rooms" with agency FOIA response materials and other information be routinely available to the public, with electronic search and indexing features.

Members of the public can visit the FDA Public Reading Room in person at 5600 Fishers Lane, Rockville, Maryland.
