= Eco-score =

Food label

The Eco-score (now known as the Green-Score), like the Nutri-Score, is a food label with five categories: from A (green, the preferred choice) to E (red, the choice to be avoided). The aim is to help consumers make more ecological choices when making their purchases. The Green-Score became the new name for the Eco-Score in the end of 2024.

== Development ==
The methodology to calculate the Eco-Score was developed by a group of 8 independent players in France: ECO2 Initiative, Etiquettable, FoodChéri, Marmiton, Open Food Facts, ScanUp, Seazon and Yuka. In France, the score was introduced in January 2021 with the aim of giving customers instant information on the environmental impact of a product and thus helping them to consume more sustainably.

With the same purpose Colruyt Group launched the Eco-score in Belgium in March 2021. The group behind Colruyt, OKay, Spar, Bio-Planet, Cru and others, also intends to make its private label products more sustainable based on this calculation. A few months later, Carrefour announced that it would display the score on the packaging of many products in France. In August, Lidl Belgium also joined the club with the display on price labels.

In the meantime, the Eco-score can be found through more and more channels: not only on the packaging or price labels of many products, but through barcode scanners and search functions also in apps (Xtra, SmartwithFood, MyColruyt) and on various websites (bioplanet.be, carrefour.fr, colruyt.be ...). Besides the scores of retailer's private label products, the scores of national brand products are increasingly available.

== Calculation ==
The method of calculating the Eco-score consists of two components: the life cycle analysis of a product on the one hand and an additional bonus-malus system on the other.

1. The life cycle analysis (LCA) takes into account 16 impact categories that play an important role from the creation of a product to its disposal: climate change, water use, land use, particulate matter, acidification ... Each impact category is measured in the different phases of the product's life cycle. This analysis is therefore much more than just the CO_{2} emission or 'carbon footprint'. The life cycle analyses (LCA) of many product categories are available in the French Agribalyse database.
2. The Eco-score also takes into account additional criteria: production method, packaging, origin, environmental policy of the country of origin and biodiversity. Plus and/or minus points are awarded if a product makes an environmental effort, or not. For example, products with a European organic label are awarded 15 bonus points.

== Application ==
The method of calculating the Eco-Score can be applied to lots of food products. Water, soft drinks and fresh fruits and vegetables do not currently receive a score yet. The first step is to find out how the calculation method can also be tailored to these specific products and can, for example, take seasonality into account.

At present, the Eco-score does not yet exist for non-food products. There are various other ecolabels, such as the European Ecolabel which is also based on the life cycle analysis (LCA). Electrical appliances and light bulbs, for example, are also given an energy label. Note that this measure only gives an insight into the energy efficiency and not into the entire environmental impact.

== Relevance ==
The Eco-score was developed for food products because the food sector has a significant impact on the environment. Before food reaches your plate, it is produced, processed, packaged, transported, refrigerated ... This requires a lot of energy and raw materials. From the energy used to heat greenhouses to the fuel to transport products to the shops. This all causes environmental pollution and gas emissions. Moreover, food production requires a large part of the available land and water. In addition, it brings with it environmental problems such as manure surplus and overfishing.

In total, about one third of all climate impact is caused by producing and eating food. It ranges from climate change and biodiversity loss to disruption of the nitrogen cycle. By choosing sustainable food, we increase the ecological carrying capacity of the earth and deplete the available raw materials less quickly.

== Notes ==
- The results of a life cycle analysis (LCA) show the environmental impact per kilogram produced and consumed. They are not calculated at product level, but per product category. For biscuits with chocolate, for example.
- The bonus-malus system makes it possible to apply interesting nuances at product level that are not taken into account by the generic life cycle analyses from the Agribalyse database. For example, the use of endangered fish species, non-recyclable materials, or the positive impact of organic or extensive production on animal welfare or landscapes (fields, mountain pastures, hedgerows ...).
- In the meantime, there are several calls for the implementation of an Eco-score harmonised by the European Commission.
