= Food and Drug Administration =

Federal agency of the United States Department of Health and Human Services

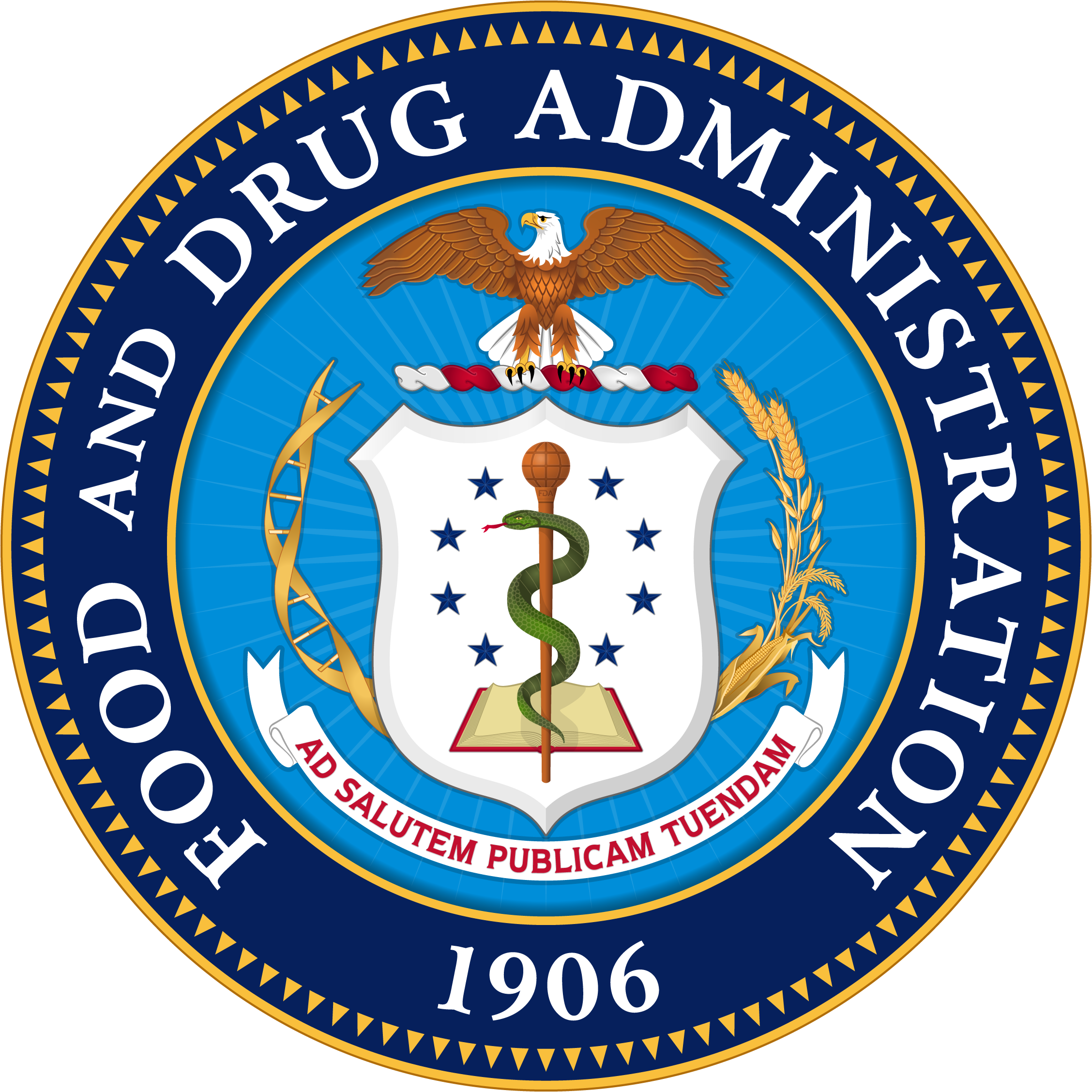
- Seal in use since 2026

- Logo of the FDA

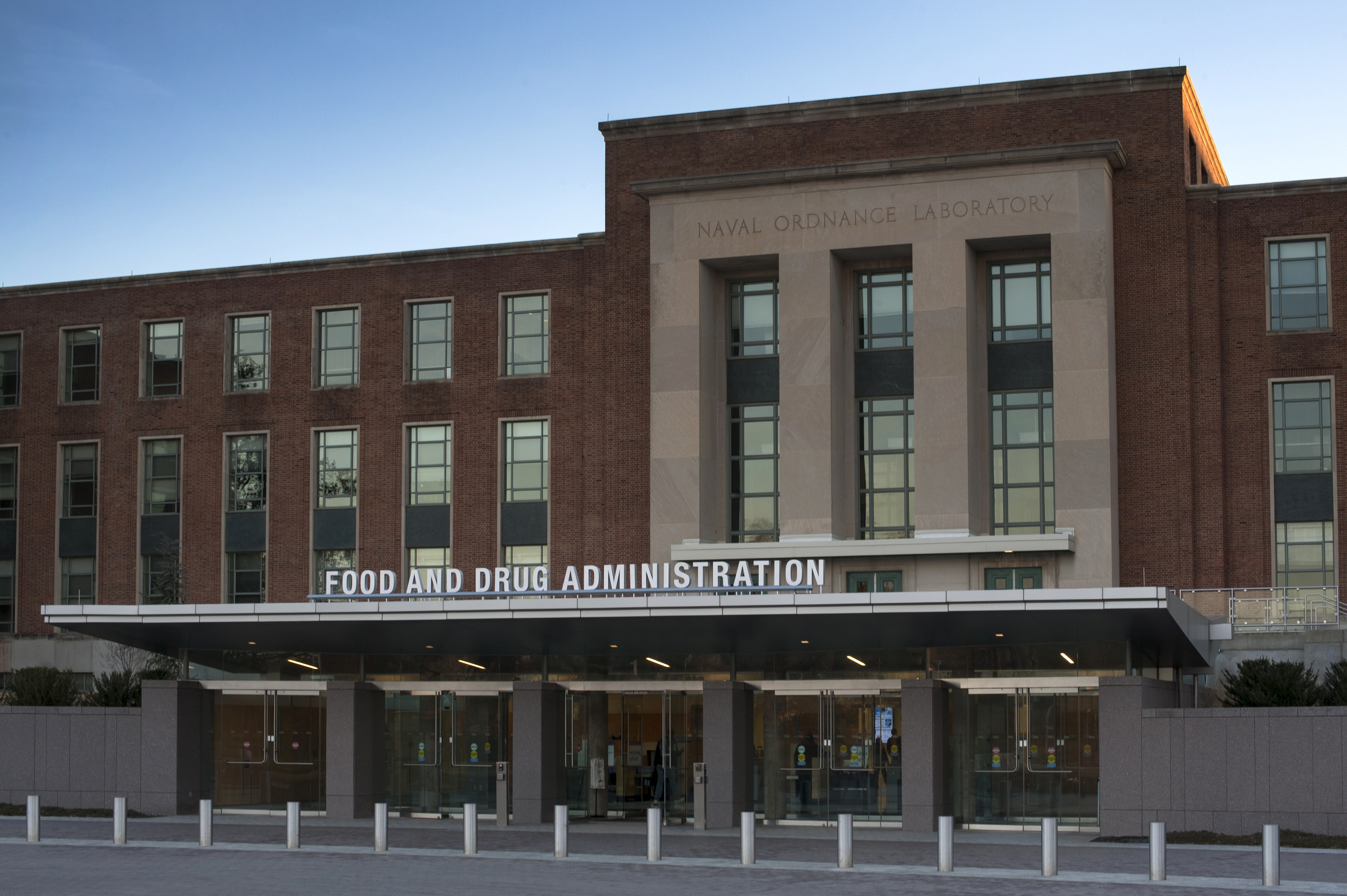
- Building 1 on the White Oak campus is the FDA's administrative headquarters.

Agency overview
- Formed: June 30, 1906; 120 years ago
- Preceding agencies: Food, Drug, and Insecticide Administration (July 1927 – July 1930); Bureau of Chemistry, USDA (July 1901 – July 1927); Division of Chemistry, USDA (established 1862)
- Jurisdiction: Federal government of the United States
- Headquarters: Silver Spring, Maryland, U.S.; 39°02′07″N 76°58′59″W
- Employees: 18,000 (2022)
- Annual budget: US$6.5 billion (2022)
- Agency executives: Kyle Diamantas (acting), Commissioner of Food and Drugs; Vacant, Principal Deputy Commissioner
- Parent agency: Department of Health and Human Services
- Child agencies: Center for Biologics Evaluation and Research; Center for Devices and Radiological Health; Center for Drug Evaluation and Research; Center for Food Safety and Applied Nutrition; Center for Tobacco Products; Center for Veterinary Medicine; National Center for Toxicological Research; Office of Criminal Investigations; Office of Regulatory Affairs
- Key document: Pure Food and Drug Act
- Website: fda.gov

The Food and Drug Administration (FDA) is a federal agency of the United States Department of Health and Human Services (HHS). The FDA is responsible for protecting and promoting public health through the control and supervision of food safety, tobacco products, caffeine products, dietary supplements, prescription and over-the-counter pharmaceutical drugs (medications), vaccines, biopharmaceuticals, blood transfusions, medical devices, electromagnetic radiation emitting devices (ERED), cosmetics, animal foods & feed, and veterinary products.

The FDA's primary focus is enforcing the Federal Food, Drug, and Cosmetic Act (FD&C). However, the agency also enforces other laws, notably Section 361 of the Public Health Service Act as well as associated regulations. Much of this regulatory-enforcement work is not directly related to food or drugs but involves other regulated products like lasers, cellular phones, and condoms. In addition, the FDA uses its authority to mitigate diseases in a variety of contexts, from household pets to human sperm for use in assisted reproduction.

The FDA is led by the commissioner of food and drugs, who is appointed by the president with the advice and consent of the Senate. The commissioner reports to the secretary of health and human services. Marty Makary is the current commissioner.

The FDA's headquarters is located in the White Oak area of Silver Spring, Maryland, occupying the former Naval Ordnance Laboratory. The agency has 223 field offices and 13 laboratories located across the 50 states, the United States Virgin Islands, and Puerto Rico. In 2008, the FDA began to post employees to foreign countries, including China, India, Costa Rica, Chile, Belgium, and the United Kingdom.

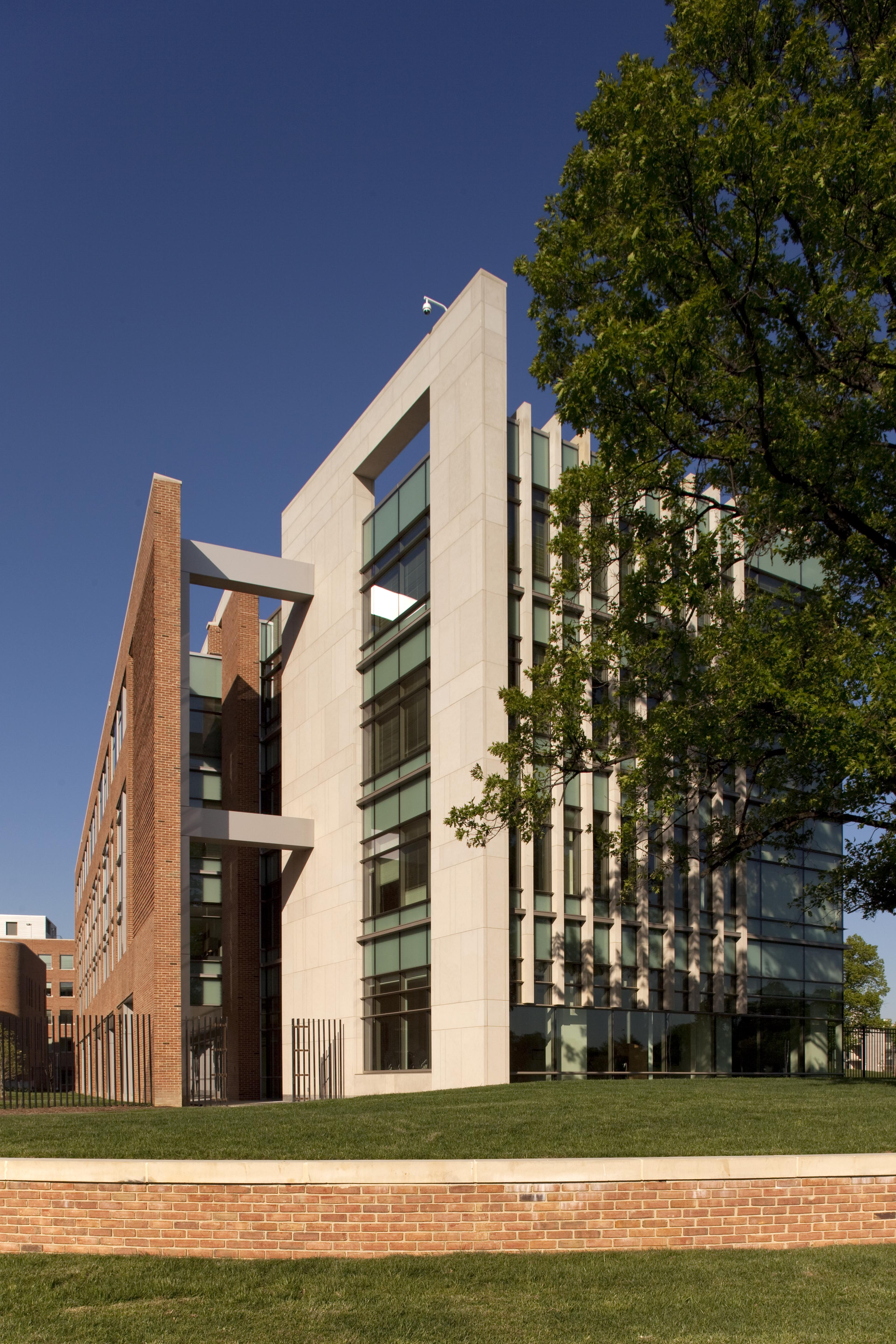
FDA Building 31 houses the Office of the Commissioner and the Office of Regulatory Department of Health and Human Services. The agency consists of fourteen centers and offices. (Note: The quoted text from the source indicates "9" but the actual count from the website indicates "14".)

== Organizational structure ==
- Department of Health and Human Services
  - Food and Drug Administration
    - Office of the Commissioner (C)
      - Office of the Chief Counsel (OCC)
      - Office of the Executive Secretariat (OES)
      - Office of the Counselor to the Commissioner
      - Office of Digital Transformation (ODT)
    - Center for Biologics Evaluation and Research (CBER)
    - Center for Devices and Radiological Health (CDRH)
    - Center for Drug Evaluation and Research (CDER)
    - Center for Food Safety and Applied Nutrition (CFSAN)
    - Center for Tobacco Products (CTP)
    - Center for Veterinary Medicine (CVM)
    - Oncology Center of Excellence (OCE)
    - Office of Regulatory Affairs (ORA)
    - Office of Clinical Policy and Programs (OCPP)
    - Office of External Affairs (OEA)
    - Office of Food Policy and Response (OFPR)
    - Office of Minority Health and Health Equity (OMHHE)
    - Office of Operations (OO)
    - Office of Policy, Legislation, and International Affairs (OPLIA)
    - Office of the Chief Scientist (OCS)
      - National Center for Toxicological Research (NCTR)
    - Office of Women's Health (OWH)

== Location ==
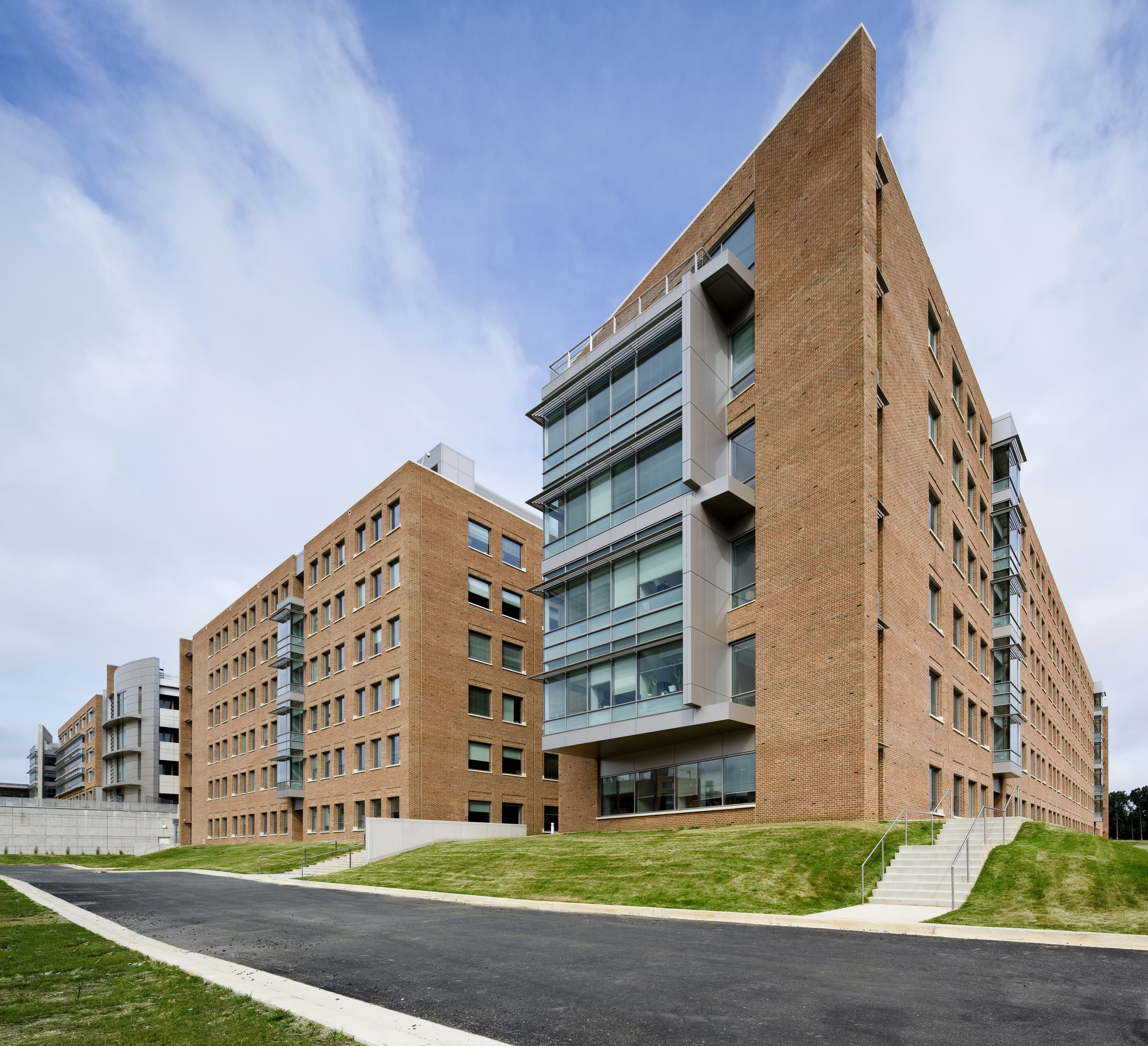
FDA Building 66 houses the Center for Devices and Radiological Health.

=== Headquarters ===
FDA headquarters facilities are currently located in Montgomery County and Prince George's County, Maryland.

=== White Oak Federal Research Center ===
Since 1990, the FDA has had employees and facilities on 130 acres (53 hectares) of the White Oak Federal Research Center in the White Oak area of Silver Spring, Maryland. In 2001, the General Services Administration (GSA) began new construction on the campus to consolidate the FDA's 25 existing operations in the Washington metropolitan area, its headquarters in Rockville, and several fragmented office buildings. The first building, the Life Sciences Laboratory, was dedicated and opened with 104 employees in December 2003. As of December 2018, the FDA campus has a population of 10,987 employees housed in approximately 3,800,000 square feet (350,000 square metres) of space, divided into ten offices and four laboratory buildings. The campus houses the Office of the Commissioner (OC), the Office of Regulatory Affairs (ORA), the Center for Drug Evaluation and Research (CDER), the Center for Devices and Radiological Health (CDRH), the Center for Biologics Evaluation and Research (CBER) and offices for the Center for Veterinary Medicine (CVM).

With the passing of the FDA Reauthorization Act of 2017, the FDA projects a 64% increase in employees to 18,000 over the next 15 years and wants to add approximately 1,600,000 square feet (150,000 square metres) of office and special use space to their existing facilities. The National Capital Planning Commission approved a new master plan for this expansion in December 2018, and construction is expected to be completed by 2035, dependent on GSA appropriations.

=== Field locations ===
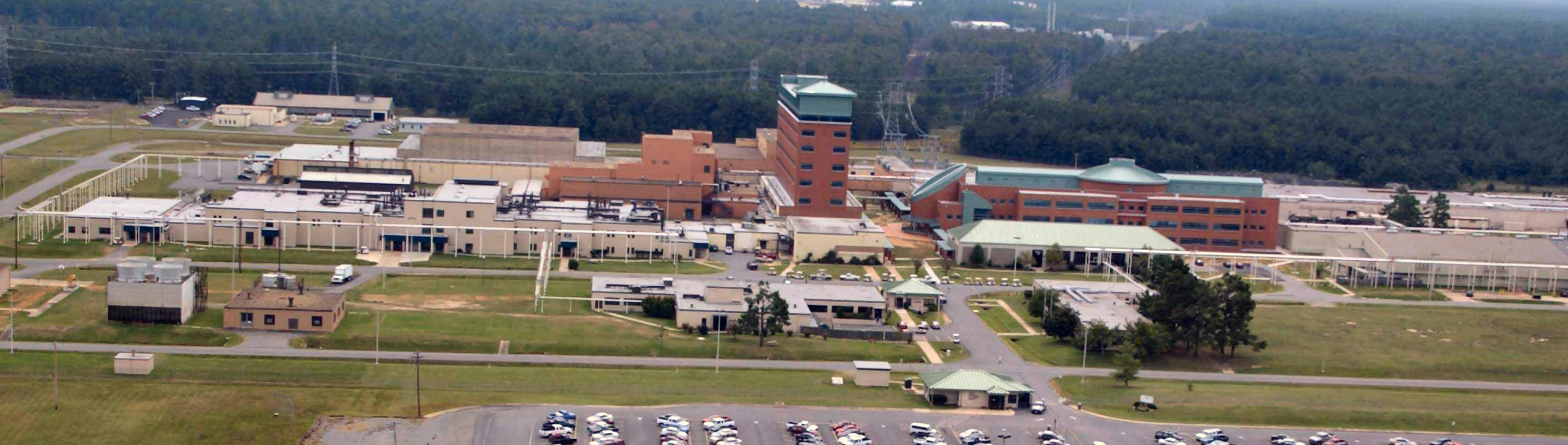
The Arkansas Laboratory in Jefferson, Arkansas, is the headquarters of the National Center for Toxicological Research.

==== Office of Regulatory Affairs ====
The Office of Regulatory Affairs is considered the agency's "eyes and ears", conducting the vast majority of the FDA's work in the field. Its employees, known as Consumer Safety Officers, or more commonly simply as investigators, inspect production and warehousing facilities, investigate complaints, illnesses, or outbreaks, and review documentation in cases involving medical devices, drugs, biological products, and other items where it may be difficult to conduct a physical examination or take a physical sample of the product. The Office of Regulatory Affairs is divided into five regions, which are further divided into 20 districts. The districts are based roughly on the geographic divisions of the federal court system. Each district comprises a main district office and a number of Resident Posts, which are FDA remote offices that serve a particular geographic area. ORA also includes the Agency's network of regulatory laboratories, which analyze any physical samples taken. Though samples are usually food-related, some laboratories are equipped to analyze drugs, cosmetics, and radiation-emitting devices.

==== Office of Criminal Investigations ====
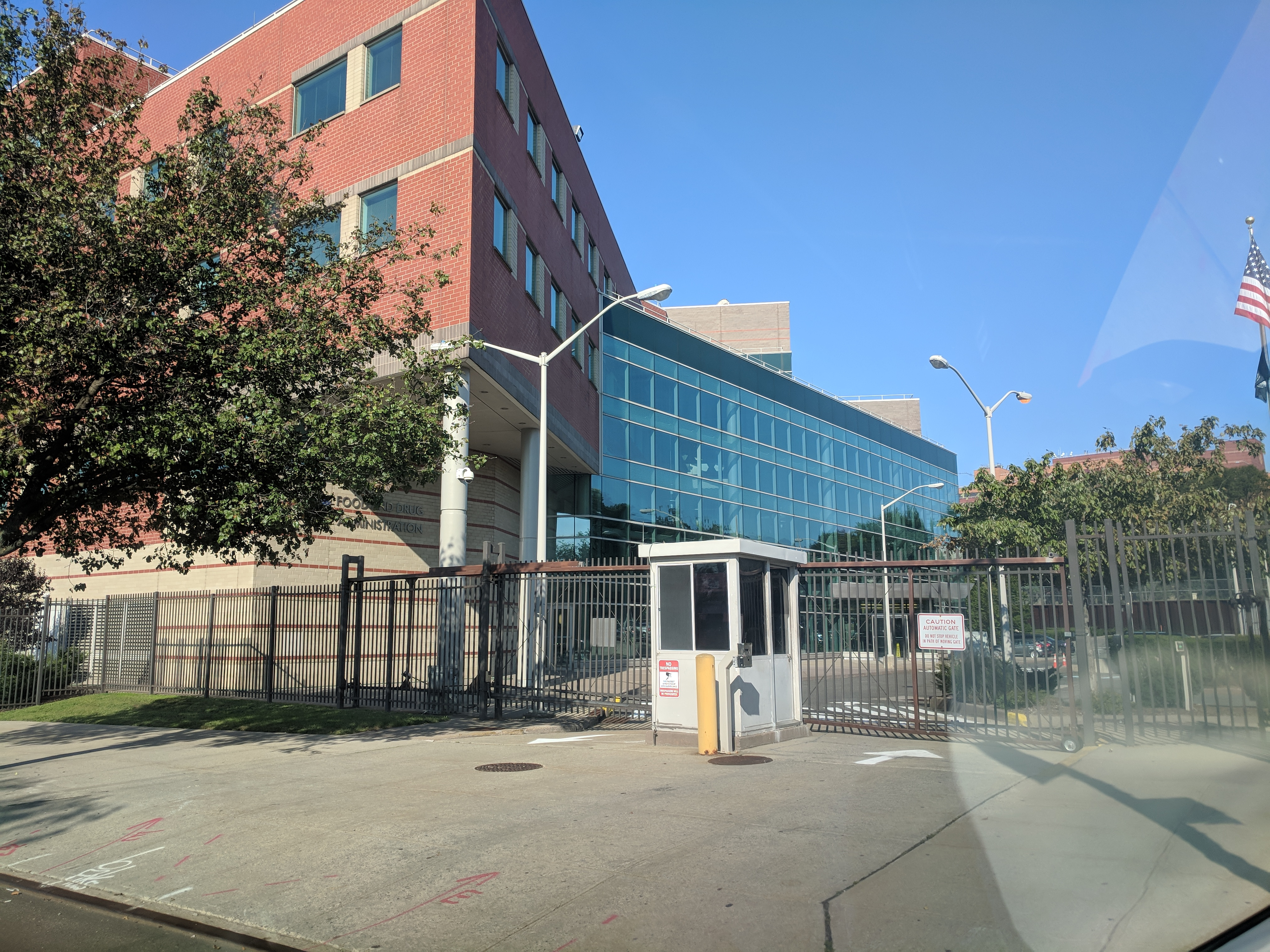
Jamaica, Queens, New York Regional Office - USFDA

The Office of Criminal Investigations was established in 1991 to investigate criminal cases. To do so, OCI employs approximately 200 special agents nationwide who, unlike ORA Investigators, are armed, have badges, and do not focus on technical aspects of the regulated industries. Rather, OCI agents pursue and develop cases when individuals and companies commit criminal actions, such as fraudulent claims or knowingly and willfully shipping known adulterated goods in interstate commerce. In many cases, OCI pursues cases involving violations of Title 18 of the United States Code (e.g., conspiracy, false statements, wire fraud, mail fraud), in addition to prohibited acts as defined in Chapter III of the FD&C Act. OCI special agents often come from other criminal investigations backgrounds, and frequently work closely with the Federal Bureau of Investigation, assistant attorney general, and even Interpol. OCI receives cases from a variety of sources, including ORA, local agencies, and the FBI, and works with ORA investigators to help develop the technical and science-based aspects of a case.

==== Other locations ====
The FDA has a number of field offices across the United States, in addition to international locations in China, India, Europe, the Middle East, and Latin America.

== Scope and funding ==
As of 2021, the FDA had responsibility for overseeing $2.7 trillion in food, medical, and tobacco products. Some 54% of its budget derives from the federal government, and 46% is covered by industry user fees for FDA services. For example, pharmaceutical firms pay fees to expedite drug reviews.

According to Forbes, pharmaceutical firms provide 75% of the FDA's drug review budget.

== Regulatory programs ==
=== Emergency approvals (EUA) ===
Emergency Use Authorization (EUA) is a mechanism that was created to facilitate the availability and use of medical countermeasures, including vaccines and personal protective equipment, during public health emergencies such as the Zika virus epidemic, the Ebola virus epidemic and the COVID-19 pandemic.

=== Regulations ===
The programs for safety regulation vary widely by the type of product, its potential risks, and the regulatory powers granted to the FDA. For example, the FDA regulates almost every facet of prescription drugs, including testing, manufacturing, labeling, advertising, marketing, efficacy, and safety—yet FDA regulation of cosmetics focuses primarily on labeling and safety. The FDA regulates most products with a set of published standards enforced by a modest number of facility inspections. Inspection observations are documented on Form 483.

In June 2018, the FDA released a statement regarding new guidelines to help food and drug manufacturers "implement protections against potential attacks on the U.S. food supply". One of the guidelines includes the Intentional Adulteration (IA) rule, which requires strategies and procedures by the food industry to reduce the risk of compromise in facilities and processes that are significantly vulnerable.

The FDA also uses tactics of regulatory shaming, mainly through online publication of non-compliance, warning letters, and "shaming lists." Regulation by shaming harnesses firms' sensitivity to reputational damage. For example, in 2018, the agency published an online "black list", in which it named dozens of branded drug companies that are supposedly using unlawful or unethical means to attempt to impede competition from generic drug companies.

The FDA frequently works with other federal agencies, including the Department of Agriculture, the Drug Enforcement Administration, Customs and Border Protection, and the Consumer Product Safety Commission. They also often work with local and state government agencies in performing regulatory inspections and enforcement actions.

=== Food and dietary supplements ===
The regulation of food and dietary supplements by the Food and Drug Administration is governed by various statutes enacted by the United States Congress and interpreted by the FDA. Pursuant to the Federal Food, Drug, and Cosmetic Act and accompanying legislation, the FDA has authority to oversee the quality of substances sold as food in the United States, and to monitor claims made in the labeling of both the composition and the health benefits of foods.

The FDA subdivides substances that it regulates as food into various categories, including foods, food additives, added substances (human-made substances that are not intentionally introduced into food but still end up in it), and dietary supplements. Dietary supplements or dietary ingredients include vitamins, minerals, herbs, amino acids, and enzymes. Specific standards the FDA exercises differ from one category to the next. Furthermore, legislation had granted the FDA a variety of means to address violations of standards for a given substance category.

Under the Dietary Supplement Health and Education Act of 1994 (DSHEA), the FDA is responsible for ensuring that manufacturers and distributors of dietary supplements and dietary ingredients meet the current requirements. These manufacturers and distributors are not allowed to advertise their products in an adulterated way, and they are responsible for evaluating the safety and labeling of their product.

The FDA has a "Dietary Supplement Ingredient Advisory List" that includes ingredients that sometimes appear on dietary supplements but need further evaluation. An ingredient is added to this list when it is excluded from use in a dietary supplement, does not appear to be an approved food additive or recognized as safe, and/or is subjected to the requirement for pre-market notification without having a satisfied requirement.

==== "FDA-Approved" vs. "FDA-Accepted in Food Processing" ====
The FDA does not approve applied coatings used in the food processing industry. There is no review process to approve the composition of nonstick coatings; nor does the FDA inspect or test these materials. Through their governing of processes, however, the FDA does have a set of regulations that cover the formulation, manufacturing, and use of nonstick coatings. Hence, materials like Polytetrafluoroethylene (Teflon) are not and cannot be considered as FDA Approved, but rather, they are a "FDA Compliant" or "FDA Acceptable".

=== Medical countermeasures (MCMs) ===
Medical countermeasures (MCMs) are products such as biologics and pharmaceutical drugs that can protect from or treat the health effects of a chemical, biological, radiological, or nuclear (CBRN) attack. MCMs can also be used for prevention and diagnosis of symptoms associated with CBRN attacks or threats. The FDA runs a program called the "FDA Medical Countermeasures Initiative" (MCMi), with programs funded by the federal government. It helps support "partner" agencies and organisations prepare for public health emergencies that could require MCMs.

=== Medications ===
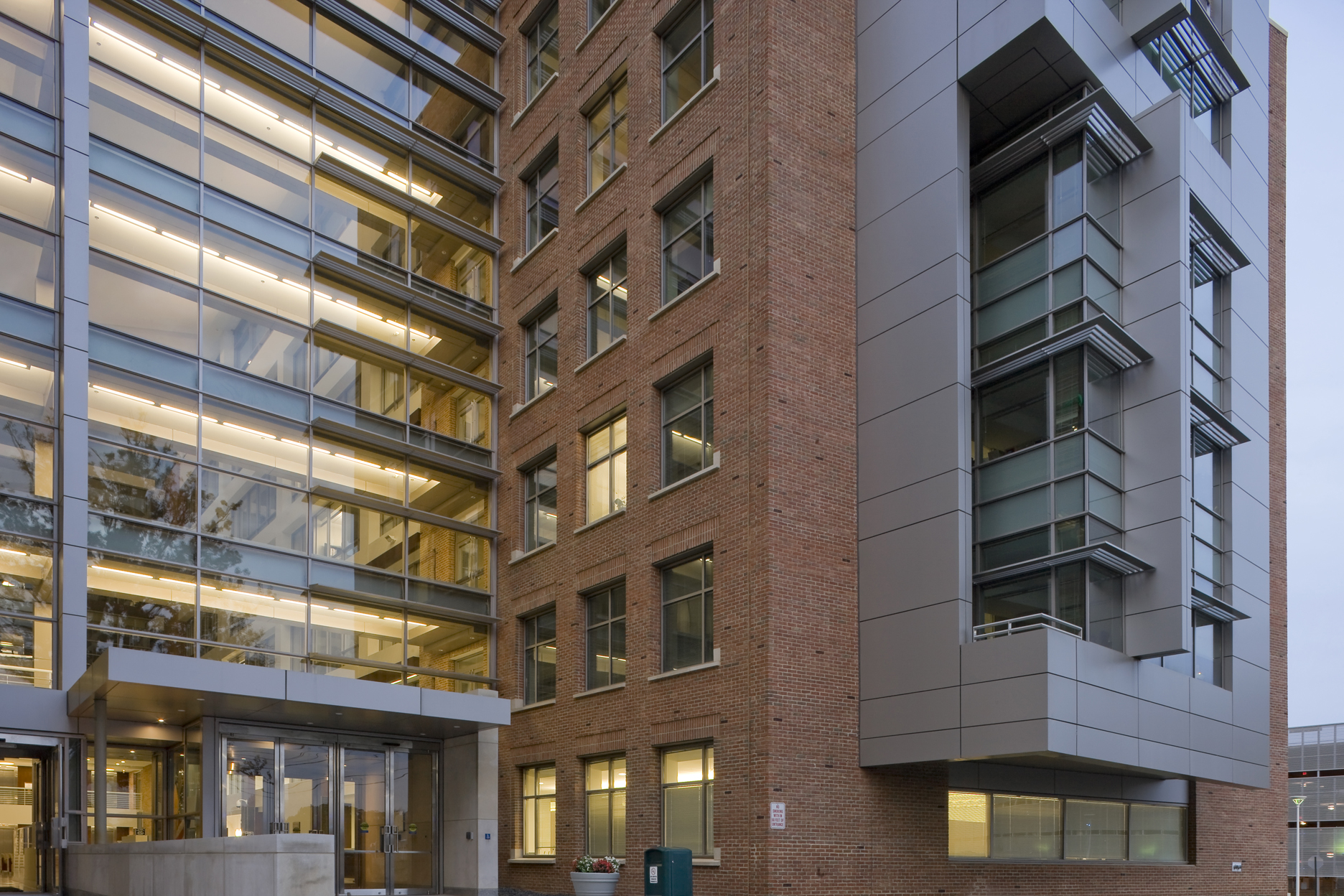
FDA Building 51 houses the Center for Drug Evaluation and Research.

The Center for Drug Evaluation and Research uses different requirements for the three main drug product types: new drugs, generic drugs, and over-the-counter drugs. A drug is considered "new" if it is made by a different manufacturer, uses different excipients or inactive ingredients, is used for a different purpose, or undergoes any substantial change. The most rigorous requirements apply to new molecular entities: drugs that are not based on existing medications.

==== New medications ====
New drugs receive extensive scrutiny before FDA approval in a process called a new drug application (NDA). During the first Donald Trump presidency, the agency worked to make the drug-approval process go faster. Critics, however, argue that FDA standards are not sufficiently rigorous to prevent unsafe or ineffective drugs from getting approval. New drugs are available only by prescription by default. A change to over-the-counter (OTC) status is a separate process, and the drug must be approved through an NDA first. A drug that is approved is said to be "safe and effective when used as directed". Drugs being produced by a new manufacturer can be approved through one of two faster processes: the Abbreviated New Drug Application (ANDA) or the 505(b)(2) regulatory pathway for complex generic or biosimilar medications.

Very rare, limited exceptions to this multi-step process involving animal testing and controlled clinical trials can be granted out of compassionate use protocols. This was the case during the 2015 Ebola epidemic with the use, by prescription and authorization, of ZMapp and other experimental treatments, and for new drugs that can be used to treat debilitating and/or very rare conditions for which no existing remedies or drugs are satisfactory, or where there has not been an advance in a long period of time. The studies are progressively longer, gradually adding more individuals as they progress from stage I to stage III, typically over a period of years, and normally involve drug companies, the government and its laboratories, and often medical schools and hospitals and clinics. However, any exceptions to the aforementioned process are subject to strict review and scrutiny and conditions, and are only given if a substantial amount of research and at least some preliminary human testing has shown that they are believed to be somewhat safe and possibly effective. (See FDA Special Protocol Assessment about Phase III trials.)

===== Advertising and promotion =====
The FDA's Office of Prescription Drug Promotion (OPDP) has responsibilities that revolve around the review and regulation of prescription drug advertising and promotion. This is achieved through surveillance activities and the issuance of enforcement letters to pharmaceutical manufacturers. Advertising and promotion for over-the-counter drugs is regulated by the Federal Trade Commission. The FDA also implements regulatory oversight through engagement with third-party enforcer firms. It expects pharmaceutical companies to ensure that third-party suppliers and labs comply with the agency's health and safety guidelines.

The drug advertising regulation contains two broad requirements: (1) a company may advertise or promote a drug only for the specific indication or medical use for which it was approved by FDA. Also, an advertisement must contain a "fair balance" between the benefits and the risks (side effects) of a drug. The regulation of drug advertising in the U.S. is divided between the Food and Drug Administration (FDA) and the Federal Trade Commission (FTC), based on whether the drug in question is a prescription drug or an over-the-counter (OTC) drug. The FDA oversees the advertising of prescription drugs, while the FTC regulates the advertising of OTC drugs.

The term off-label refers to the practice of prescribing a drug for a different purpose than what the FDA approved.

Due to this approval requirement, manufacturers were prohibited from advertising COVID-19 vaccines during the period in which they had only been approved under Emergency Use Authorization.

===== Post-market safety surveillance =====
After NDA approval, the sponsor must then review and report to the FDA every single patient adverse drug experience it learns of. They must report unexpected serious and fatal adverse drug events within 15 days, and other events on a quarterly basis. The FDA also receives directly adverse drug event reports through its MedWatch program. These reports are called "spontaneous reports" because reporting by consumers and health professionals is voluntary.

While this remains the primary tool of post-market safety surveillance, FDA requirements for post-marketing risk management are increasing. As a condition of approval, a sponsor may be required to conduct additional clinical trials, called Phase IV trials. In some cases, the FDA requires risk management plans called Risk Evaluation and Mitigation Strategies (REMS) for some drugs that require actions to be taken to ensure that the drug is used safely. For example, thalidomide can cause birth defects, but has uses that outweigh the risks if men and women taking the drugs do not conceive a child; a REMS program for thalidomide mandates an auditable process to ensure that people taking the drug take action to avoid pregnancy; many opioid drugs have REMS programs to avoid addiction and diversion of drugs. The drug isotretinoin has a REMS program called iPLEDGE.

==== Generic drugs ====
Generic drugs are chemical and therapeutic equivalents of name-brand drugs, typically those whose patents have expired. Approved generic drugs should have the same dosage, safety, effectiveness, strength, stability, and quality, as well as route of administration. In general, they are less expensive than their name brand counterparts, are manufactured and marketed by rival companies and, in the 1990s, accounted for about a third of all prescriptions written in the United States. For a pharmaceutical company to gain approval to produce a generic drug, the FDA requires scientific evidence that the generic drug is interchangeable with or therapeutically equivalent to the originally approved drug. This is called an Abbreviated New Drug Application (ANDA). 80% of prescription drugs sold in the United States are generic brands.

===== Generic drug scandal =====
In 1989, a major scandal erupted involving the procedures used by the FDA to approve generic drugs for sale to the public. Charges of corruption in generic drug approval first emerged in 1988 during the course of an extensive congressional investigation into the FDA. The oversight subcommittee of the United States House Energy and Commerce Committee resulted from a complaint brought against the FDA by Mylan Laboratories Inc. of Pittsburgh. When its application to manufacture generics was subjected to repeated delays by the FDA, Mylan, convinced that it was being discriminated against, soon began its own private investigation of the agency in 1987. Mylan eventually filed suit against two former FDA employees and four drug-manufacturing companies, charging that corruption within the federal agency resulted in racketeering and violations of antitrust law. "The order in which new generic drugs were approved was set by the FDA employees even before drug manufacturers submitted applications," and, according to Mylan, this illegal procedure was followed to give preferential treatment to certain companies. During the summer of 1989, three FDA officials (Charles Y. Chang, David J. Brancat, and Walter Kletch) pleaded guilty to criminal charges of accepting bribes from generic drug makers, and two companies (Par Pharmaceutical and its subsidiary Quad Pharmaceuticals) pleaded guilty to giving bribes.

Furthermore, it was discovered that several manufacturers had falsified data submitted in seeking FDA authorization to market certain generic drugs. Vitarine Pharmaceuticals of New York, which sought approval of a generic version of the drug Dyazide, a medication for high blood pressure, submitted Dyazide, rather than its generic version, for the FDA tests. In April 1989, the FDA investigated 11 manufacturers for irregularities; and later brought that number up to 13. Dozens of drugs were eventually suspended or recalled by manufacturers. In the early 1990s, the U.S. Securities and Exchange Commission filed securities fraud charges against the Bolar Pharmaceutical Company, a major generic manufacturer based in Long Island, New York.

==== Over-the-counter drugs ====
Over-the-counter (OTC) drugs are drugs like aspirin that do not require a doctor's prescription. The FDA has a list of approximately 800 such approved active ingredients that are combined in various ways to create more than 100,000 OTC drug products. Many OTC drug ingredients, such as ibuprofen, had been previously approved as prescription drugs and were later deemed safe enough for use without a medical practitioner's supervision. There are two main approval tracks. The OTC New Drug Application is similar to a prescription drug NDA but often requires consumer behavior studies to indicate the drug can be safely used without supervision. The alternative is the OTC Monograph process, where a monograph acts as a “recipe,” setting out active ingredients and conditions such as combination with other active ingredients, dosage, and labeling indications, directions and warnings, with which the manufacturer must comply to market the product without FDA premarket approval.

==== Ebola treatment ====
In 2014, the FDA added an Ebola treatment being developed by Canadian pharmaceutical company Tekmira to the Fast Track program, but halted the phase 1 trials in July pending the receipt of more information about how the drug works. This was widely viewed as increasingly important in the face of a major outbreak of the disease in West Africa that began in late March 2014 and ended in June 2016.

==== Coronavirus (COVID-19) testing ====
During the coronavirus pandemic, FDA granted emergency use authorization for personal protective equipment (PPE), in vitro diagnostic equipment, ventilators and other medical devices.

On March 18, 2020, FDA inspectors postponed most foreign facility inspections and all domestic routine surveillance facility inspections. In contrast, the USDA's Food Safety and Inspection Service (FSIS) continued inspections of meatpacking plants, which resulted in 145 FSIS field employees who tested positive for COVID-19, and three who died.

=== Vaccines, blood and tissue products, and biotechnology ===
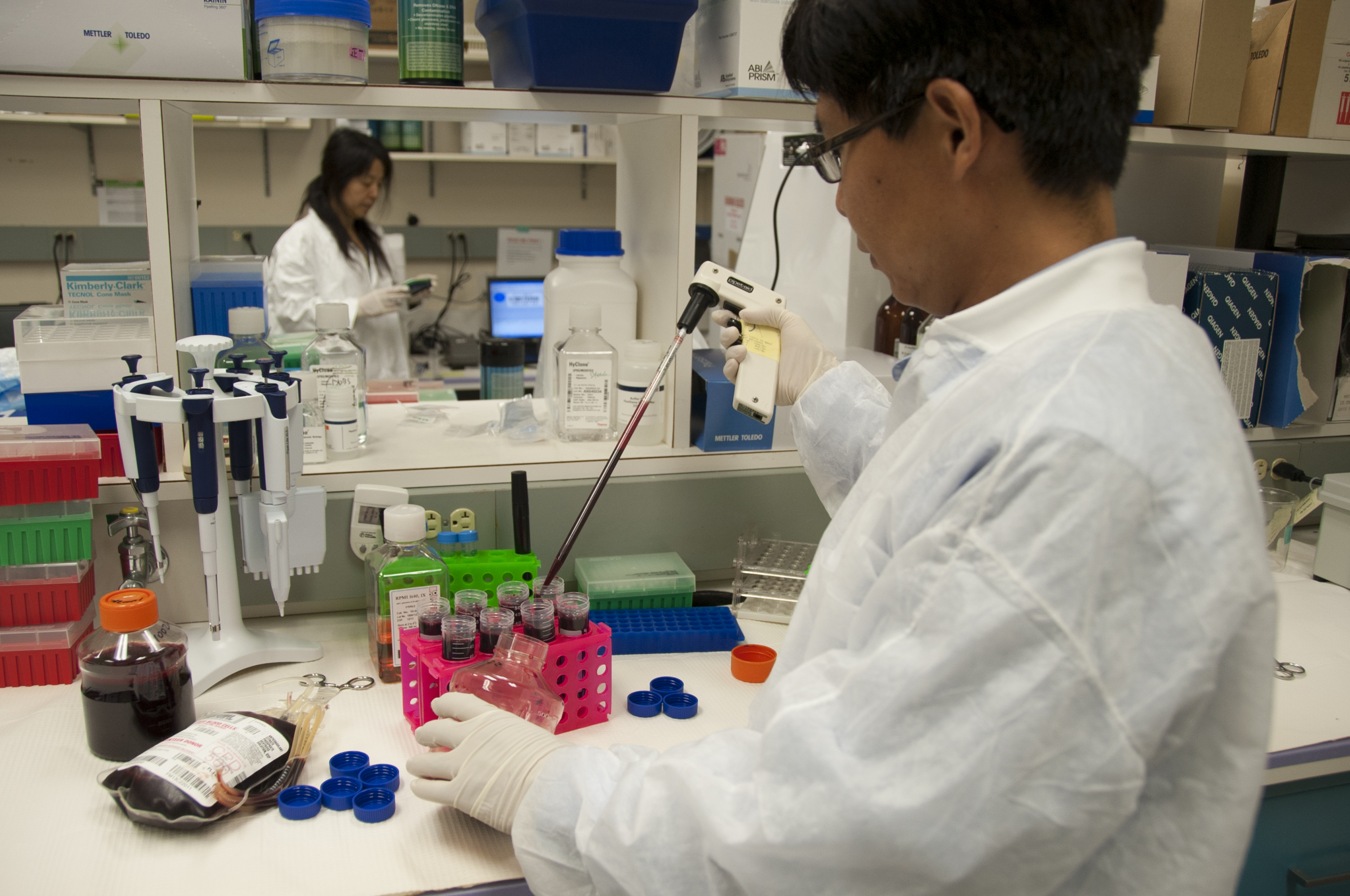
FDA scientist prepares blood donation samples for testing.

The Center for Biologics Evaluation and Research is the branch of the FDA responsible for ensuring the safety and efficacy of biological therapeutic agents. These include blood and blood products, vaccines, allergenics, cell and tissue-based products, and gene therapy products. New biologics are required to go through a premarket approval process called a Biologics License Application (BLA), similar to that for drugs.

The original authority for government regulation of biological products was established by the 1902 Biologics Control Act, with additional authority established by the 1944 Public Health Service Act. Along with these Acts, the Federal Food, Drug, and Cosmetic Act also applies to all biologic products. Originally, the entity responsible for regulation of biological products resided under the National Institutes of Health; this authority was transferred to the FDA in 1972.

=== Medical and radiation-emitting devices ===
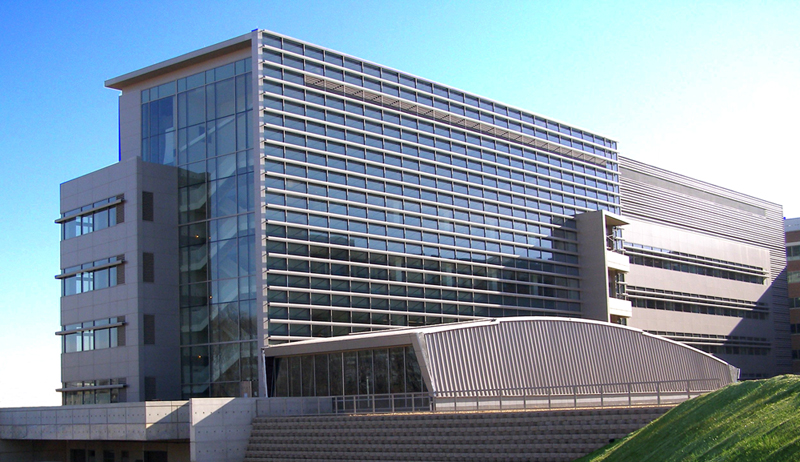
FDA Building 62 houses the Center for Devices and Radiological Health.

The Center for Devices and Radiological Health (CDRH) is the branch of the FDA responsible for the premarket approval of all medical devices, as well as overseeing the manufacturing, performance, and safety of these devices. The definition of a medical device is given in the FD&C Act, and it includes products from the simple toothbrush to complex devices such as implantable neurostimulators. CDRH also oversees the safety performance of non-medical devices that emit certain types of electromagnetic radiation. Examples of CDRH-regulated devices include cellular phones, airport baggage screening equipment, television receivers, microwave ovens, tanning booths, and laser products.

CDRH regulatory powers include the authority to require certain technical reports from the manufacturers or importers of regulated products, to require that radiation-emitting products meet mandatory safety performance standards, to declare regulated products defective, and to order the recall of defective or noncompliant products. CDRH also conducts limited amounts of direct product testing.

==== "FDA-Cleared" vs "FDA-Approved" ====
Clearance requests are required for medical devices that prove they are "substantially equivalent" to the predicate devices already on the market. Approved requests are for items that are new or substantially different and need to demonstrate "safety and efficacy", for example they may be inspected for safety in case of new toxic hazards. Both aspects need to be proved or provided by the submitter to ensure proper procedures are followed.

=== Cosmetics ===
Cosmetics are regulated by the Center for Food Safety and Applied Nutrition, the same branch of the FDA that regulates food. Cosmetic products are not, in general, subject to premarket approval by the FDA unless they make "structure or function claims" that make them into drugs (see Cosmeceutical). However, all color additives must be specifically FDA approved before manufacturers can include them in cosmetic products sold in the U.S. The FDA regulates cosmetics labeling, and cosmetics that have not been safety tested must bear a warning to that effect.

According to the industry advocacy group, the American Council on Science and Health, though the cosmetic industry is primarily responsible for its own product safety, the FDA can intervene when necessary to protect the public. In general, though, cosmetics do not require pre-market approval or testing. The ACSH says that companies must place a warning note on their products if they have not been tested, and that experts in cosmetic ingredient review also play a role in monitoring safety through influence on ingredients, but they lack legal authority. According to the ACSH, it has reviewed about 1,200 ingredients and has suggested that several hundred be restricted—but there is no standard or systemic method for reviewing chemicals for safety, or a clear definition of what 'safety' even means so that all chemicals get tested on the same basis.

However, on December 29, 2022, President Biden signed the '2023 Consolidated Budget Act', which includes the 'Cosmetics Regulatory Modernization Act of 2022 (MoCRA)', which is a stricter regulation that is different from the previous regulations. MoCRA requires compliance with matters such as serious adverse event reporting, safety substantiation, additional labeling, record keeping, and Good Manufacturing Practices (GMP). MoCRA also calls on the FDA to grant Mandatory Recall Authority and establish regulations for GMP rules, flavor allergen labeling rules, and testing methods for cosmetics containing talc.

=== Veterinary products ===
The Center for Veterinary Medicine (CVM) is a center of the FDA that regulates food additives and drugs that are given to animals. CVM regulates animal drugs, animal food including pet animal, and animal medical devices. The FDA's requirements to prevent the spread of bovine spongiform encephalopathy are also administered by CVM through inspections of feed manufacturers. CVM does not regulate vaccines for animals; these are handled by the United States Department of Agriculture.

=== Tobacco products ===
The FDA regulates tobacco products with authority established by the 2009 Family Smoking Prevention and Tobacco Control Act. This act requires color warnings on cigarette packages and printed advertising, and text warnings from the U.S. surgeon general.

The nine new graphic warning labels were announced by the FDA in June 2011 and were scheduled to be required to appear on packaging by September 2012. The implementation date is uncertain, due to ongoing proceedings in the case of R.J. Reynolds Tobacco Co. v. U.S. Food and Drug Administration. R.J. Reynolds, Lorillard, Commonwealth Brands, Liggett Group and Santa Fe Natural Tobacco Company have filed suit in Washington, D.C. federal court claiming that the graphic labels are an unconstitutional way of forcing tobacco companies to engage in anti-smoking advocacy on the government's behalf.

A First Amendment lawyer, Floyd Abrams, is representing the tobacco companies in the case, contending requiring graphic warning labels on a lawful product cannot withstand constitutional scrutiny. The Association of National Advertisers and the American Advertising Federation have also filed a brief in the suit, arguing that the labels infringe on commercial free speech and could lead to further government intrusion if left unchallenged. In November 2011, federal judge Richard Leon of the U.S. District Court for the District of Columbia temporarily halted the new labels, likely delaying the requirement that tobacco companies display the labels. The U.S. Supreme Court ultimately could decide the matter.

In July 2017, the FDA announced a plan that would reduce the current levels of nicotine permitted in tobacco cigarettes. The proposed regulation, identified as RIN 0910-AI76, titled "Tobacco Product Standard for Nicotine Yield of Cigarettes and Certain Other Combusted Tobacco Products," seeks to reduce the nicotine content in cigarettes to approximately 0.7 milligrams per gram of tobacco.

=== Regulation of living organisms ===
With acceptance of premarket notification 510(k) k033391 in January 2004, the FDA granted Ronald Sherman permission to produce and market medical maggots for use in humans or other animals as a prescription medical device. Medical maggots represent the first living organism allowed by the Food and Drug Administration for production and marketing as a prescription medical device.

In June 2004, the FDA cleared Hirudo medicinalis (medicinal leeches) as the second living organism legal to use as a medical device.

The FDA also requires that milk be pasteurized to remove bacteria.

=== International Cooperation ===
In February 2011, President Barack Obama and Canadian prime minister Stephen Harper issued a "Declaration on a Shared Vision for Perimeter Security and Economic Competitiveness" and announced the creation of the Canada-United States Regulatory Cooperation Council (RCC) "to increase regulatory transparency and coordination between the two countries."

Under the RCC mandate, the FDA and Health Canada undertook a "first of its kind" initiative by selecting "as its first area of alignment common cold indications for certain over-the-counter antihistamine ingredients (GC 2013-01-10)."

A more recent example of the FDA's international work is their 2018 cooperation with regulatory and law-enforcement agencies worldwide through Interpol as part of Operation Pangea XI. The FDA targeted 465 websites that illegally sold potentially dangerous, unapproved versions of opioid, oncology, and antiviral prescription drugs to U.S. consumers. The agency focused on transaction laundering schemes in order to uncover the complex online drug network.

== Science and research programs ==
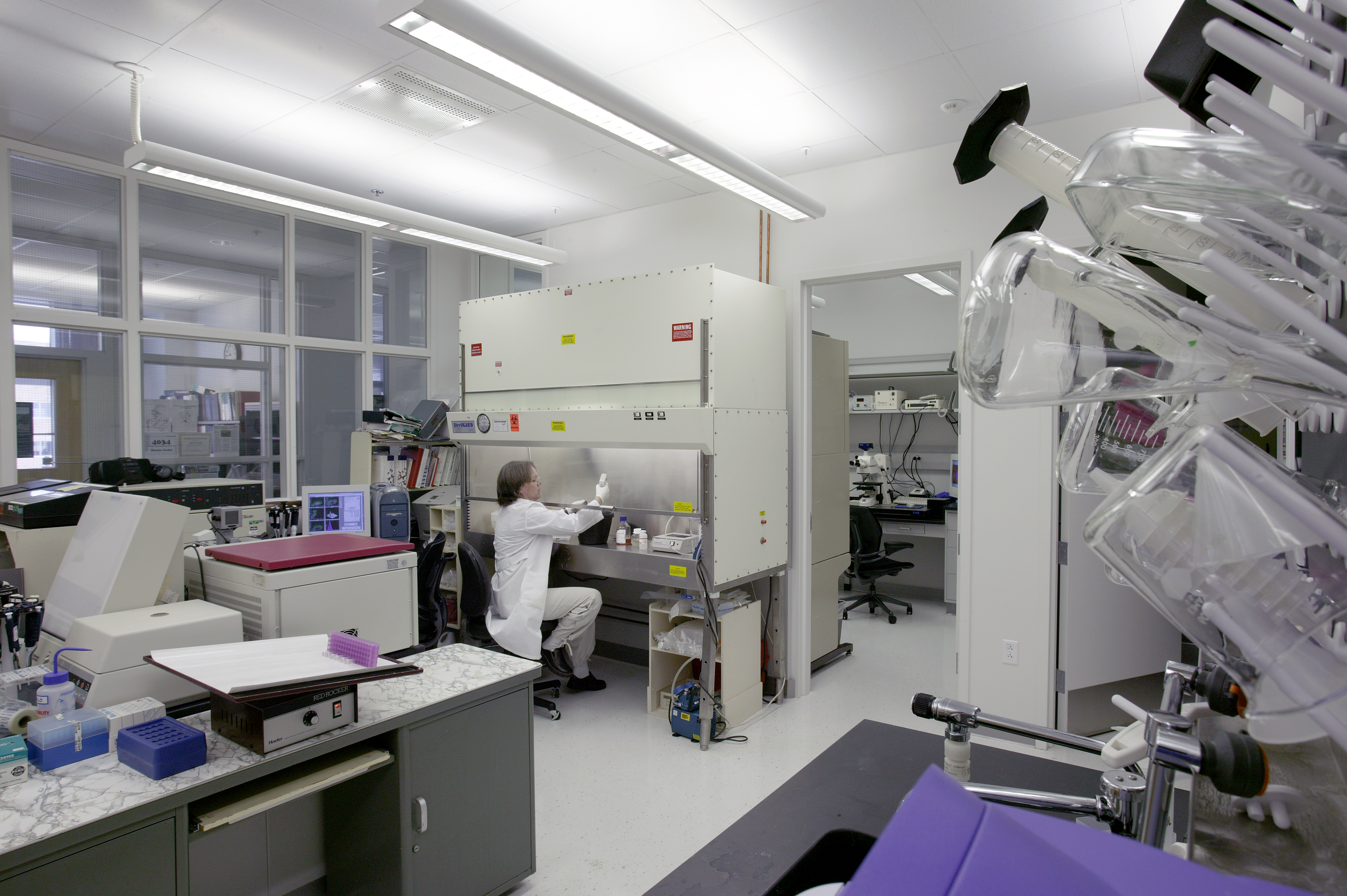
FDA lab at Building 64 in Silver Spring, Maryland

The FDA carries out research and development activities to develop technology and standards that support its regulatory role, with the objective of resolving scientific and technical challenges before they become impediments. The FDA's research efforts include the areas of biologics, medical devices, drugs, women's health, toxicology, food safety and applied nutrition, and veterinary medicine.

== Data management ==
The FDA has collected a large amount of data through the decades. The OpenFDA project was created to enable easy access of the data for the public and was officially launched in June 2014.

== History ==
Until the 20th century, there were few federal laws regulating the contents and sale of domestically produced food and pharmaceuticals, with one exception being the Vaccine Act of 1813. The history of the FDA can be traced to the latter part of the 19th century and the Division of Chemistry of the U.S. Department of Agriculture, which itself derived from the Copyright and Patent Clause. Under Harvey Washington Wiley, appointed chief chemist in 1883, the Division began conducting research into the adulteration and misbranding of food and drugs on the American market. Wiley's advocacy came at a time when the public had become aroused to hazards in the marketplace by muckraking journalists like Upton Sinclair, and became part of a general trend for increased federal regulations in matters pertinent to public safety during the Progressive Era. The Biologics Control Act of 1902 was put in place after a diphtheria antitoxin derived from tetanus-contaminated serum caused the deaths of thirteen children in St. Louis, Missouri. The serum was originally collected from a horse named Jim who had contracted tetanus.

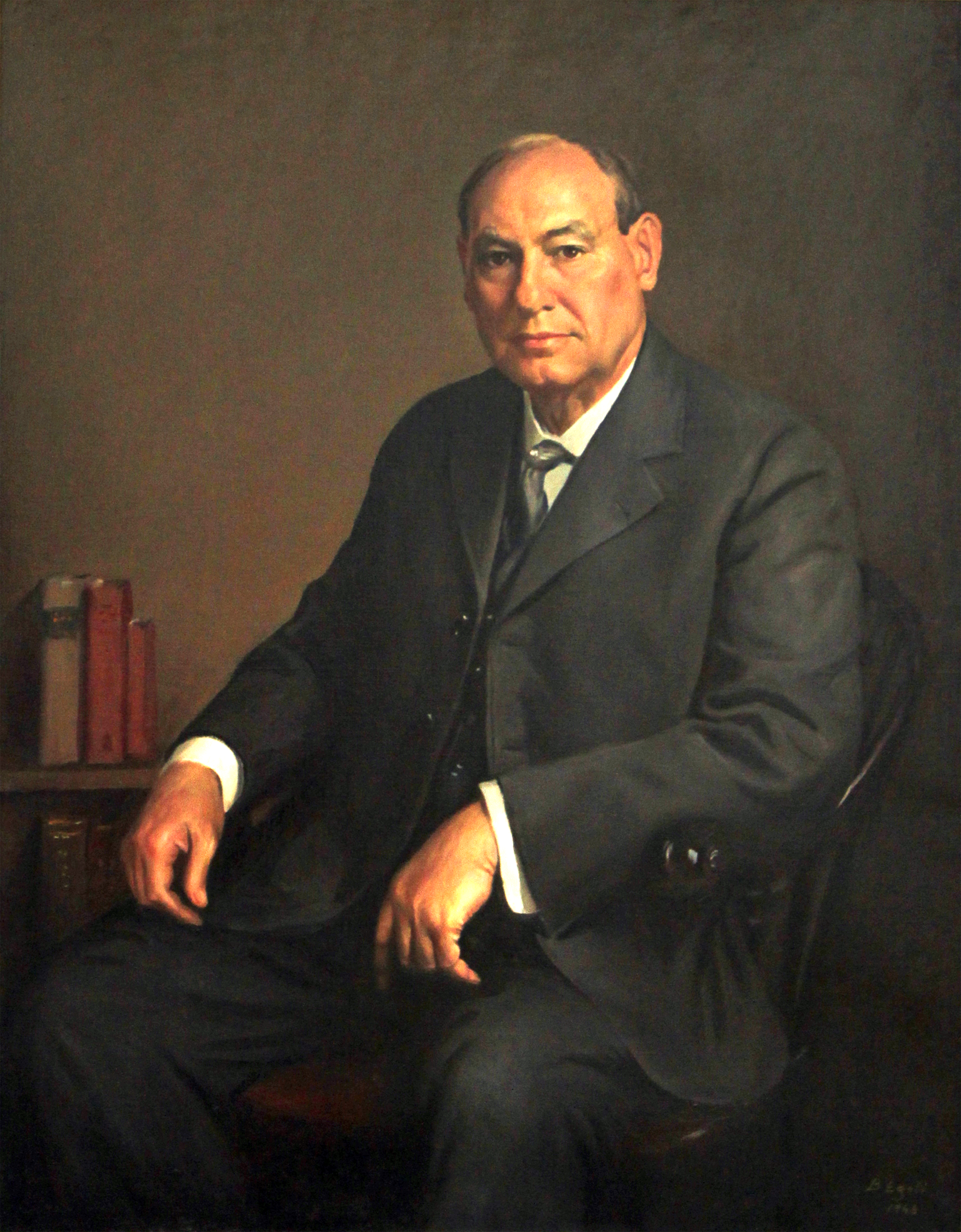
Harvey W. Wiley, chief advocate of the Food and Drug Act

In June 1906, President Theodore Roosevelt signed into law the Pure Food and Drug Act of 1906, also known as the "Wiley Act" after its chief advocate. The Act prohibited, under penalty of seizure of goods, the interstate transport of food that had been "adulterated". The act applied similar penalties to the interstate marketing of "adulterated" drugs, in which the "standard of strength, quality, or purity" of the active ingredient was not either stated clearly on the label or listed in the United States Pharmacopeia or the National Formulary.

The responsibility for examining food and drugs for such "adulteration" or "misbranding" was given to Wiley's USDA Bureau of Chemistry. Wiley used these new regulatory powers to pursue an aggressive campaign against the manufacturers of foods with chemical additives, but the Chemistry Bureau's authority was soon checked by judicial decisions, which narrowly defined the bureau's powers and set high standards for proof of fraudulent intent. In 1927, the Bureau of Chemistry's regulatory powers were reorganized under a new USDA body, the Food, Drug, and Insecticide Administration. This name was shortened to the Food and Drug Administration (FDA) three years later.

By the 1930s, muckraking journalists, consumer protection organizations, and federal regulators began mounting a campaign for stronger regulatory authority by publicizing a list of injurious products that had been ruled permissible under the 1906 law, including radioactive beverages, mascara that could cause blindness, and worthless "cures" for diabetes and tuberculosis. The resulting proposed law did not get through the Congress of the United States for five years, but was rapidly enacted into law following the public outcry over the 1937 Elixir Sulfanilamide tragedy, in which more than 100 people died after using a drug formulated with a toxic, untested solvent.

President Franklin Delano Roosevelt signed the Federal Food, Drug, and Cosmetic Act into law on June 24, 1938. The new law significantly increased federal regulatory authority over drugs by mandating a pre-market review of the safety of all new drugs, as well as banning false therapeutic claims in drug labeling without requiring that the FDA prove fraudulent intent. The law also authorized the FDA to issue minimum food standards of identity for all mass-produced foods to reduce food fraud. By the 1970s, the FDA began pivoting from setting detailed standards of identity for foods to requiring informative labels – an ‘informational turn’ in food regulation aimed at steering food markets through disclosure rather than direct control. Later, in the 1990s, the FDA would update these information label rules with the introduction of the Nutrition Facts panel.

Soon after passage of the 1938 Act, the FDA began to designate certain drugs as safe for use only under the supervision of a medical professional, and the category of "prescription-only" drugs was securely codified into law by the Durham-Humphrey Amendment in 1951. These developments confirmed extensive powers for the FDA to enforce post-marketing recalls of ineffective drugs.

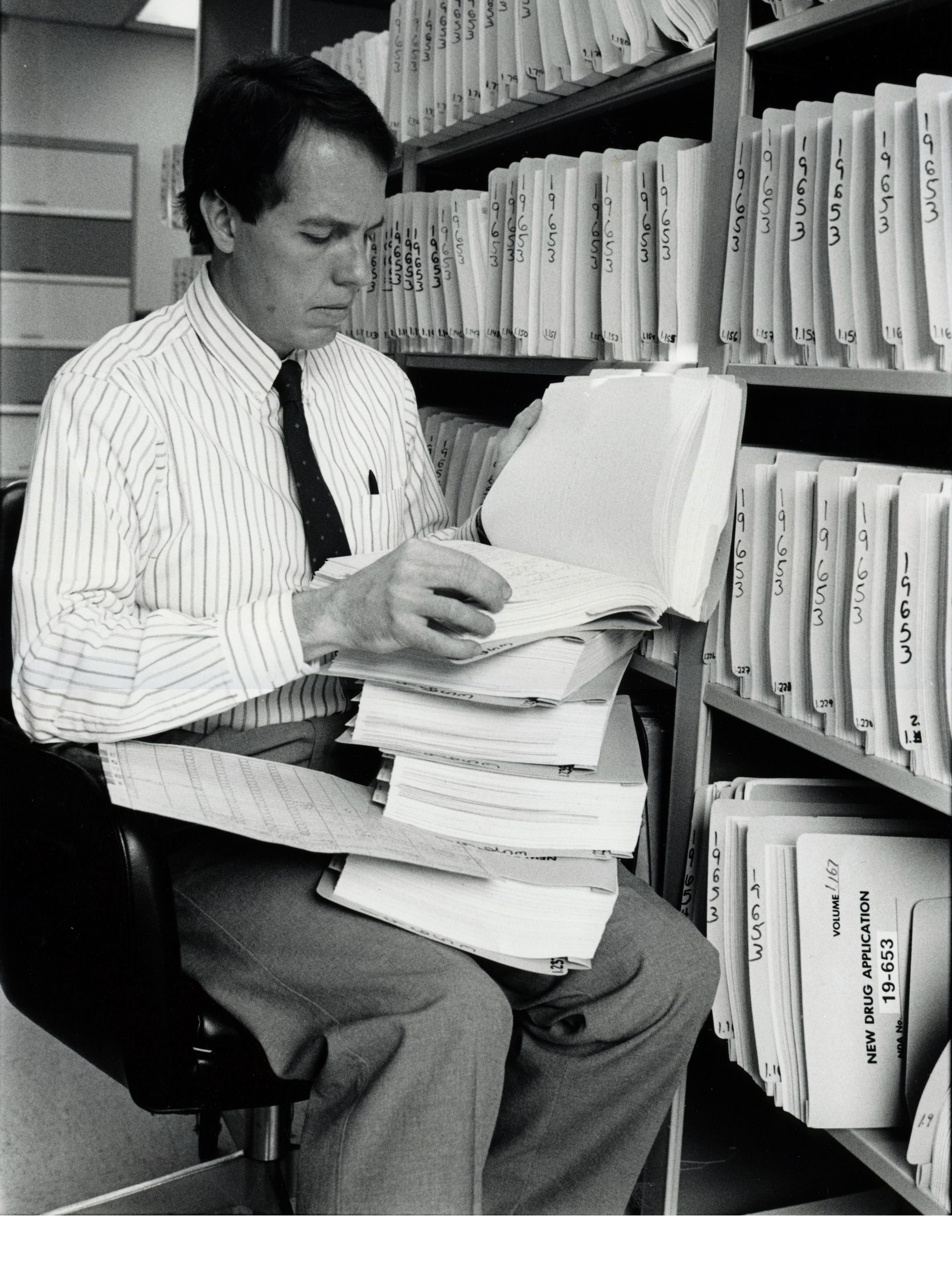
Medical Officer Alexander Fleming, M. D., examines a portion of a 240-volume new drug application around the late 1980s. Applications grew considerably after the efficacy mandate under the 1962 Drug Amendments.

Outside of the US, the drug thalidomide was marketed for the relief of general nausea and morning sickness, but caused birth defects and even the death of thousands of babies when taken during pregnancy. American mothers were largely unaffected as Frances Oldham Kelsey of the FDA refused to authorize the medication for market. In 1962, the Kefauver-Harris Amendment to the FD&C Act was passed, which represented a "revolution" in FDA regulatory authority. The most important change was the requirement that all new drug applications demonstrate "substantial evidence" of the drug's efficacy for a marketed indication, in addition to the existing requirement for pre-marketing demonstration of safety. This marked the start of the FDA approval process in its modern form.

These reforms increased the time and difficulty required to bring a drug to market. One of the most important statutes in establishing the modern American pharmaceutical market was the 1984 Drug Price Competition and Patent Term Restoration Act, more commonly known as the "Hatch-Waxman Act" after its chief sponsors. The act extended the patent exclusivity terms of new drugs, and tied those extensions, in part, to the length of the FDA approval process for each individual drug. For generic manufacturers, the act created a new approval mechanism, the Abbreviated New Drug Application (ANDA), in which the generic drug manufacturer need only demonstrate that their generic formulation has the same active ingredient, route of administration, dosage form, strength, and pharmacokinetic properties ("bioequivalence") as the corresponding brand-name drug. This act has been credited with, in essence, creating the modern generic drug industry.

Concerns about the length of the drug approval process were brought to the fore early in the AIDS epidemic. In the mid and late 1980s, ACT-UP and other HIV activist organizations accused the FDA of unnecessarily delaying the approval of medications to fight HIV and opportunistic infections. Partly in response to these criticisms, the FDA issued new rules to expedite approval of drugs for life-threatening diseases, and expanded pre-approval access to drugs for patients with limited treatment options. All of the initial drugs approved for the treatment of HIV/AIDS were approved through these accelerated approval mechanisms. Frank Young, then commissioner of the FDA, was behind the Action Plan Phase II, established in August 1987 for quicker approval of AIDS medication.

In two instances, state governments have sought to legalize drugs that the FDA has not approved. Under the theory that federal law, passed pursuant to Constitutional authority, overrules conflicting state laws, federal authorities still claim the authority to seize, arrest, and prosecute for possession and sales of these substances, even in states where they are legal under state law. The first wave was the legalization by 27 states of laetrile in the late 1970s. This drug was used as a treatment for cancer, but scientific studies both before and after this legislative trend found it ineffective. The second wave concerned medical marijuana in the 1990s and 2000s. Though Virginia passed legislation allowing doctors to recommend cannabis for glaucoma or the side effects of chemotherapy, a more widespread trend began in California with the Compassionate Use Act of 1996.

When the FDA requested Endo Pharmaceuticals on June 8, 2017, to remove an extended-release formulation of oxymorphone hydrochloride from the market, it was the first request in FDA history to recall an effective drug over its potential for misuse.

In February 2025, FDA food division head Jim Jones quit in protest of the "indiscriminate" layoffs of 89 staff members by the Donald Trump administration.

In May 2025, the FDA announced changes in its COVID-19 vaccine policy, intending to limit approved indications use for adults over 65 and individuals at higher risk of complications in the fall. For healthy Americans younger than 65, the agency indicated it would likely require additional clinical trials with placebo controls to demonstrate benefit before approving wider access.

== 21st-century reforms ==
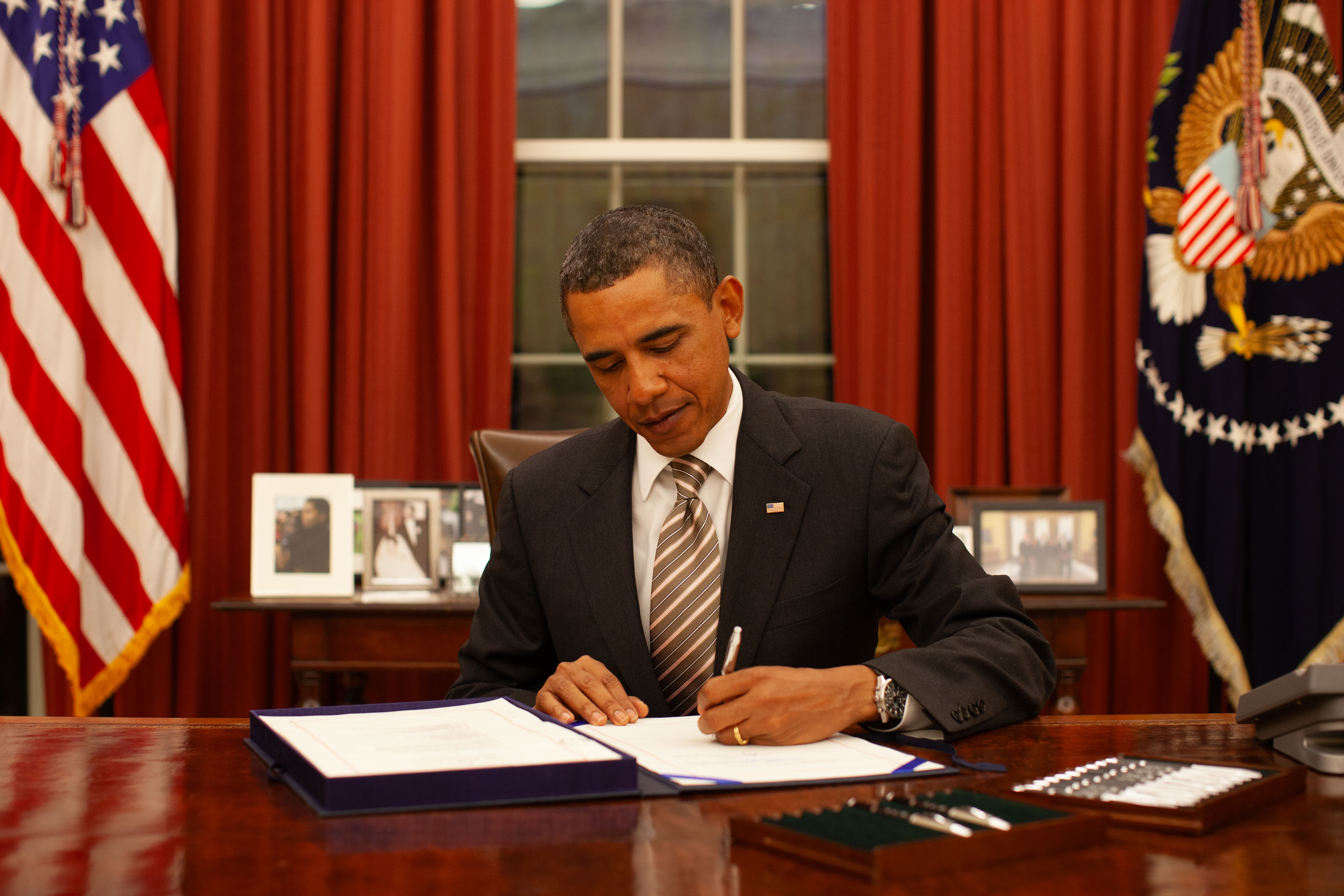
President Barack Obama signing the FDA Food Safety Modernization Act into law on January 4, 2011

=== Critical Path Initiative ===
The Critical Path Initiative is the FDA's effort to stimulate and facilitate a national effort to modernize the sciences through which FDA-regulated products are developed, evaluated, and manufactured. The Initiative was launched in March 2004, with the release of a report entitled Innovation/Stagnation: Challenge and Opportunity on the Critical Path to New Medical Products.

=== Patients' rights to access unapproved drugs ===
The Compassionate Investigational New Drug program was created after Randall v. U.S. ruled in favor of Robert C. Randall in 1978, creating a program for medical marijuana.

A 2006 court case, Abigail Alliance v. von Eschenbach, would have forced radical changes in FDA regulation of unapproved drugs. The Abigail Alliance argued that the FDA must license drugs for use by terminally ill patients with "desperate diagnoses", after they have completed Phase I testing. The case won an initial appeal in May 2006, but that decision was reversed by a March 2007 rehearing. The US Supreme Court declined to hear the case, and the final decision denied the existence of a right to unapproved medications.

Critics of the FDA's regulatory power argue that the FDA takes too long to approve drugs that might ease pain and human suffering faster if brought to market sooner. The AIDS crisis created some political efforts to streamline the approval process. However, these limited reforms were targeted for AIDS drugs, not for the broader market. This has led to the call for more robust and enduring reforms that would allow patients, under the care of their doctors, access to drugs that have passed the first round of clinical trials.

=== Post-marketing drug safety monitoring ===
The widely publicized recall of Vioxx, a non-steroidal anti-inflammatory drug (NSAID) now estimated to have contributed to fatal heart attacks in thousands of Americans, played a strong role in driving a new wave of safety reforms at both the FDA rulemaking and statutory levels. The FDA approved Vioxx in 1999, and initially hoped it would be safer than previous NSAIDs due to its reduced risk of intestinal tract bleeding. However, a number of pre and post-marketing studies suggested that Vioxx might increase the risk of myocardial infarction, and results from the APPROVe trial in 2004 conclusively demonstrated this.

Faced with numerous lawsuits, the manufacturer voluntarily withdrew it from the market. The example of Vioxx has been prominent in an ongoing debate over whether new drugs should be evaluated on the basis of their absolute safety, or their safety relative to existing treatments for a given condition. In the wake of the Vioxx recall, there were widespread calls by major newspapers, medical journals, consumer advocacy organizations, lawmakers, and FDA officials for reforms in the FDA's procedures for pre- and post-market drug safety regulation.

In 2006, a Congressional committee was appointed by the Institute of Medicine to review pharmaceutical safety regulation in the U.S. and to issue recommendations for improvements. The committee was composed of 16 experts, including leaders in clinical medicine medical research, economics, biostatistics, law, public policy, public health, and the allied health professions, as well as current and former executives from the pharmaceutical, hospital, and health insurance industries. The authors found major deficiencies in the current FDA system for ensuring the safety of drugs on the American market. Overall, the authors called for an increase in the regulatory powers, funding, and independence of the FDA. Some of the committee's recommendations were incorporated into drafts of the PDUFA IV amendment, which was signed into law as the Food and Drug Administration Amendments Act of 2007.

As of 2011, Risk Minimization Action Plans (RiskMAPS) have been created to ensure risks of a drug never outweigh the benefits of that drug within the post-marketing period. This program requires that manufacturers design and implement periodic assessments of their programs' effectiveness. The Risk Minimization Action Plans are set in place depending on the overall level of risk a prescription drug is likely to pose to the public.

=== Pediatric drug testing ===
Prior to the 1990s, only 20% of all drugs prescribed for children in the United States were tested for safety or efficacy in a pediatric population. This became a major concern of pediatricians as evidence accumulated that the physiological response of children to many drugs differed significantly from those drugs' effects on adults. Children react differently to the drugs because of many reasons, including size, weight, etc. There were several reasons that few medical trials were done with children. For many drugs, children represented such a small proportion of the potential market, that drug manufacturers did not see such testing as cost-effective.

Also, the belief that children are ethically restricted in their ability to give informed consent brought increased governmental and institutional hurdles to approval of these clinical trials, and greater concerns about legal liability. Thus, for decades, most medicines prescribed to children in the U.S. were done so in a non-FDA-approved, "off-label" manner, with dosages "extrapolated" from adult data through body weight and body-surface-area calculations.

In an initial FDA attempt to address this issue they produced the 1994 FDA Final Rule on Pediatric Labeling and Extrapolation, which allowed manufacturers to add pediatric labeling information, but required drugs that had not been tested for pediatric safety and efficacy to bear a disclaimer to that effect. However, this rule failed to motivate many drug companies to conduct additional pediatric drug trials. In 1997, the FDA proposed a rule to require pediatric drug trials from the sponsors of New Drug Applications. However, this new rule was successfully preempted in federal court as exceeding the FDA's statutory authority.

While this debate was unfolding, Congress used the Food and Drug Administration Modernization Act of 1997 to pass incentives that gave pharmaceutical manufacturers a six-month patent term extension on new drugs submitted with pediatric trial data. The Best Pharmaceuticals for Children Act of 2007 reauthorized these provisions and allowed the FDA to request NIH-sponsored testing for pediatric drug testing, although these requests are subject to NIH funding constraints. In the Pediatric Research Equity Act of 2003, Congress codified the FDA's authority to mandate manufacturer-sponsored pediatric drug trials for certain drugs as a "last resort" if incentives and publicly funded mechanisms proved inadequate.

=== Priority review voucher (PRV) ===
The priority review voucher is a provision of the Food and Drug Administration Amendments Act of 2007, which awards a transferable "priority review voucher" to any company that obtains approval for a treatment for a neglected tropical diseases. The system was first proposed by Duke University faculty David Ridley, Henry Grabowski, and Jeffrey Moe in their 2006 Health Affairs paper: "Developing Drugs for Developing Countries". President Obama signed into law the Food and Drug Administration Safety and Innovation Act of 2012, which extended the authorization until 2017. In April 2026, the scope of the voucher system was expanded through an executive order aimed at accelerating the approval of mental health treatments that have received Breakthrough Therapy designations. This order established non-transferable National Priority Vouchers (NPV), specifically designed for psychedelic-assisted therapies and psychoplastogens.

=== Rules for generic biologics ===
Since the 1990s, many successful new drugs for the treatment of cancer, autoimmune diseases, and other conditions have been protein-based biotechnology drugs, regulated by the Center for Biologics Evaluation and Research. Many of these drugs are extremely expensive; for example, the anti-cancer drug Avastin costs $55,000 for a year of treatment, while the enzyme replacement therapy drug Cerezyme costs $200,000 per year, and must be taken by Gaucher's disease patients for life.

Biotechnology drugs do not have the simple, readily verifiable chemical structures of conventional drugs, and are produced through complex, often proprietary, techniques, such as transgenic mammalian cell cultures. Because of these complexities, the 1984 Hatch-Waxman Act did not include biologics in the Abbreviated New Drug Application (ANDA) process. This precluded the possibility of generic drug competition for biotechnology drugs. In February 2007, identical bills were introduced into the House to create an ANDA process for the approval of generic biologics, but were not passed.

=== Mobile medical applications ===
In 2013, a guidance was issued to regulate mobile medical applications and protect users from their unintended use. This guidance distinguishes the apps subjected to regulation based on the marketing claims of the apps. Incorporation of the guidelines during the development phase of these apps has been proposed for expedited market entry and clearance.

=== Electronic Submissions Gateway (ESG) ===
To standardize, automate and streamline the flow of regulatory data, FDA introduced an Electronic Submissions Gateway (ESG) in 2006. This gateway allows reporting organizations to send regulatory submissions to different centers over the internet, packaged in a center-specific format and enveloped as a GNU-compatible .tar.gz file, through either a FDA-specific WebTrader application or via a more generic B2B communication protocol called AS2 (Applicability Statement 2).

=== Trump administration (2025-) ===
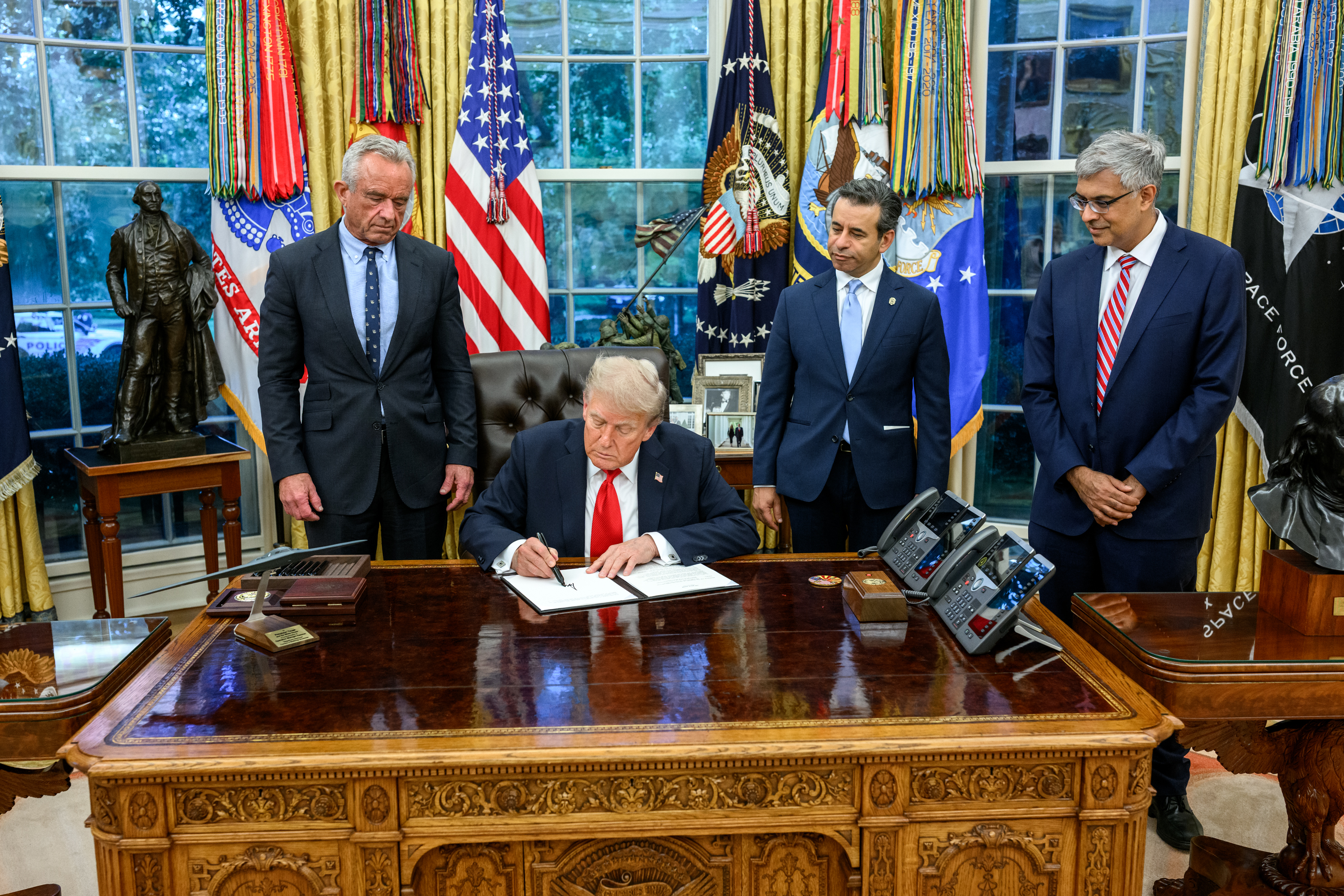
President Donald Trump signing an executive order to crack down on misleading pharmaceutical advertisements across television and social media

FDA administrator Marty Makary listed changes as of January 2026):

- Drug approvals: The number of required pivotal clinical trials was reduced from two to one for new drug approvals, demonstrated by approving a medication in 55 days. The agency adopted Bayesian statistics for trials and adopted continuous post-approval monitoring, and introduced priority reviews. Regulations around cellular and gene therapies were relaxed to encourage innovation, with a focus on common-sense standards.
- Animal testing: Animal testing was deemphasized, in favor of alternatives such as computational modeling and organ-on-a-chip technology.
- Over-the-counter medicine: More medications were made available over-the-counter (OTC). Drug rejection letters are published.
- Food and nutrition policy: Nine artificial, petroleum-based food dyes are banned. Initiatives like realfood.gov encouraged consumption of whole foods. The food pyramid was revised and flipped to emphasize protein bioavailability, individual metabolic differences, and adjusted views on saturated fat and protein requirements.
- Child vaccine schedule: To address declining vaccination rates and rebuild trust eroded during the pandemic, the childhood vaccine schedule was reduced from approximately 72 to 38 recommended doses in the early months. This change claimed to prioritize essential vaccinations while avoiding "medical absolutism", such as mandates for low-risk groups.
- Drug pricing: Most Favored Nation status pricing seeks to align U.S. drug prices with the lowest in developed nations, reducing the disproportionate R&D burden on American consumers. Efforts also targeted lowering prices for high-cost drugs like GLP-1 inhibitors for obesity treatment.
- FDA operations: Human resources and information technology were centralized. Administrative staff burdens were reduced, and 1,000 scientists were recruited. Higher user fees were imposed on phase-one trials conducted outside the U.S. to encourage domestic research.
- Pharmaceutical industry representatives are removed from FDA advisory committees when allowed by law. Under the FDA Modernization Act of 1997, certain FDA advisory committees are legally required to "include representatives from the biologics and/or drug manufacturing industries". It's unclear how the new FDA policy will impact its advisory boards, or meet the requirements established under the FDA Modernization Act.
- FDA advisory committees no longer review new drug applications.

== Advisory committees ==
Concerns have been raised about FDA advisory committees, including conflicts of interest and pharmaceutical industry ties among members of its committees, divergence of agency decisions from advisory committee recommendations, including the controversial decision to approve the Alzheimer's drug aducanumab, and industry-funded support of individuals and organizations submitting public comments.

== Overview ==
The FDA has regulatory oversight over a large array of products that affect the health and life of American citizens. As a result, the FDA's powers and decisions are monitored by several governmental and non-governmental organizations. A $1.8 million 2006 Institute of Medicine report on pharmaceutical regulation in the U.S. found major deficiencies in the current FDA system for ensuring the safety of drugs on the American market. Overall, the authors called for an increase in the regulatory powers, funding, and independence of the FDA.

== See also ==
- Adverse reaction
- Adverse event
- Adverse drug reaction
- Biosecurity
- Biosecurity in the United States
- Drug Efficacy Study Implementation
- Food and Drug Administration Modernization Act of 1997
- FDA Food Safety Modernization Act of 2011
- FDA Fast Track Development Program (for drugs)
- Food and Drug Administration Amendments Act of 2007 (e.g. drugs)
- Food and Drug Administration Safety and Innovation Act of 2012 (GAIN/QIDP etc.)
- Inverse benefit law
- Investigational Device Exemption (for use in clinical trials)
- Kefauver Harris Amendment 1962 – required "proof-of-efficacy" for drugs

International:

- Food Administration
- International Conference on Harmonisation of Technical Requirements for Registration of Pharmaceuticals for Human Use (ICH)
- African Union: African Medicines Agency
- Australia: Therapeutic Goods Administration
- Brazil: National Health Surveillance Agency
- Canada: Marketed Health Products Directorate
- Canada: Health Canada
- Denmark: Danish Medicines Agency
- European Union: European Food Safety Authority and European Medicines Agency
- Germany: Federal Institute for Drugs and Medical Devices
- India: Food Safety and Standards Authority of India and Central Drugs Standard Control Organization
- Japan: Ministry of Health, Labour and Welfare (MHLW)
- Japan: Pharmaceuticals and Medical Devices Agency
- Mexico: Federal Commission for the Protection against Sanitary Risk
- Philippines: Food and Drug Administration (FDA)
- Singapore: Health Sciences Authority
- United Kingdom: Food Standards Agency and Medicines and Healthcare products Regulatory Agency
