= Paris Open Source Summit =

Annual programming event in France

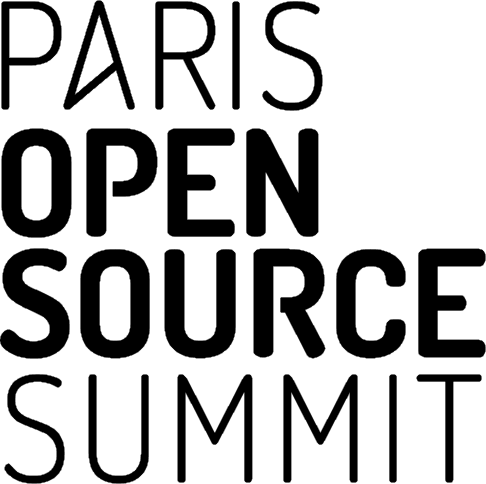
- Formation: 2008
- Type: Foundation, Nonprofit Organization
- Location: France
- Official language: French, English
- President: President 2014: Florent Zara President 2013: Pierre Queinnec; President 2012: Patrice Bertrand; Co-Presidents 2011: Jean-Pierre Laisne, Louis Montagne; President 2010: Philippe Montargès; President 2009: Jean-Noel de Galzain President 2008: Jean-Pierre Laisne
- Co-Founders: Hervé Rannou, Jean-Christophe Spilmont
- Website: http://www.openworldforum.org/

The Paris Open Source Summit (previously Open World Forum or Forum mondial du libre) is a non-commercial community annual event on open source innovation. It is organized in Paris, France. It is governed by a steering committee and program committee, consisting of representatives of several international organizations, associations and communities.

In 2013 it brought 200 speakers to an audience of 2200 people, from 40 countries.
