= OpenFDA =

OpenFDA is a project indexing and formatting Food and Drug Administration (FDA) data, and making such data accessible to the public. The ultimate goal of enabling data accessibility is to educate people and to save lives.

The currently provided API for accessing data is under a beta version. The project is open source, and the code is available from GitHub.

On March 31, 2025, the OpenFDA website was displaying "there is a temporary suspension of updates to the openFDA datasets".
