= Form FDA 483 =

Documents observations in inspections

The U.S. Food and Drug Administration (FDA) is authorized to perform inspections under the Federal Food, Drug, and Cosmetic Act, Sec. 704 (21 USC §374) "Factory Inspection". Form FDA 483, "Inspectional Observations", is a form used by the FDA to document and communicate concerns discovered during these inspections. Also referred to as "Form 483" or merely "483", it states thereon that it

... lists observations made by the FDA representative(s) during the inspection of your facility. They are inspectional observations, and do not represent a final Agency determination regarding your compliance

A recipient of a 483 should respond to the FDA, addressing each item, indicating agreement and either providing a timeline for correction or requesting clarification of what the FDA requires. This response must be submitted within 15 business days regardless of the number of observations, as of September 2009. While a response is not compulsory, a good response can usually help a company avoid receiving a Warning Letter from the FDA, withholding of product approval, or plant shut-down. Most experts warn that responses should be comprehensive, well-reasoned, well-documented and timely, and that each observation should be addressed individually.

The FDA encourages resolution of issues through informal mechanisms prior to the issuance of a 483. After issuance, manufacturers can use a formal two-tiered dispute resolution process described in the FDA document Guidance for Industry - Formal Dispute Resolution: Scientific and Technical Issues Related to Pharmaceutical CGMP, and they have 30 calendar days to do so.

The FDA refers to cellular and tissue-based products as "human cells, tissue (biology), and cellular or tissue-based products" (HCT/Ps). To protect the health of consumers, the agency also inspects these facilities and documents observations on a 483. The authority to do so is granted by 21 CFR 1271 Subpart F.

The U.S. FDA has jurisdiction only within the United States. However, the supply chain for pharmaceuticals often extends far beyond the boundaries of the U.S., so the agency has an interest in assuring that foreign operations part of the U.S. supply chain are in an appropriate state of control, even though they have no legal authority to do so — although they can restrict importation into the U.S. The agency therefore performs foreign inspections, and observations for these are also captured on a 483. Regardless of the local language, the 483 will be written in English.

== Form FDA 483 content ==
The content of a 483 may be handwritten, typed, completed in a PDF file and printed, or completed via the FDA's computer system called Turbo EIR.

=== Header information ===
The header identifies the FDA district office that performed the inspection, the date(s) of inspection, name and address of the facility that was inspected, the name and title of the individual to whom the 483 is issued to (usually the most responsible individual physically present in the facility), a brief description of the type of facility, and the facility's FEI (FDA Establishment Identification) number.

=== Observations ===
This section starts with a "disclaimer" that the form contains the observations of the inspector and does not necessarily "represent a final Agency determination regarding your compliance." Observations placed on a 483 are the opinion of the FDA investigator and may be subject to review by other FDA personnel. The full text is as follows:

This document lists observations made by the FDA representative(s) during the inspection of your facility. They are inspectional observations, and do not represent a final Agency determination regarding your compliance. If you have an objection regarding an observation, or have implemented, or plan to implement, corrective action in response to an observation, you may discuss the objection or action with the FDA representative(s) during the inspection or submit this information to FDA at the address above. If you have any questions, please contact FDA at the phone number and address above.

The observations noted in this Form FDA-483 are not an exhaustive listing of objectionable conditions. Under the law, your firm is responsible for conducting internal self-audits to identify and correct any and all violations of the quality system requirements.

The 483 then have a large area for recording the observations, which may be continued on several pages. The observations should be ranked in order of significance. If an observation made during a prior inspection has not been corrected or is a recurring observation, that may be noted on the 483.

The FDA will typically include only significant observations that can be directly linked to a violation of regulations — not suggestions, guidance, or other comments. ("Significant" is somewhat arbitrary and may be subject to the bias of a particular inspector.) Observations of questionable significance should not be on the 483, but should have been discussed with the firm's management so that they understand how uncorrected problems could become a violation. The 483 will not normally include actual regulatory references.

==== Annotation ====
As of 1997, the FDA established an annotation policy for medical device inspections. The investigator(s) should offer to annotate the 483 with one or more of the following:

1. Reported corrected, not verified.
2. Corrected and verified.
3. Promised to correct (may be appended with "by xxx date" or "within xxxx days or months").
4. Under consideration.

The actual annotation of the 483 occurs during the final discussion with the firm's management; if the firm prefers no annotation, then annotation will not be performed. The annotations may be after each observation, at the end of each page, or at the bottom of the last page prior to the investigator's signature(s).

=== Signatures ===
The investigators' names are printed and signed, and the date of issue is recorded in this section. Titles for the investigators may also be included. If the 483 is multiple pages, the first and last pages have full signatures while the intervening pages are only initialed.

=== Reverse side ===
The reverse side of the form has this text:

The observations of objectional conditions and practices listed on the front of this form are reported:

1. Pursuant to Section 704(b) of the Federal Food, Drug and Cosmetic Act, or
2. To assist firms inspected in complying with the Acts and regulations enforced by the Food and Drug Administration.

Section 704(b) of the Federal Food, Drug, and Cosmetic Act (21 USC §374(b)) provides:

'Upon completion of any such inspection of a factory, warehouse, consulting laboratory, or other establishment, and prior to leaving the premises, the officer or employee making the inspection shall give to the owner, operator, or agent in charge a report in writing setting forth any conditions or practices observed by him which, in his judgement, indicate that any food, drug, device, cosmetic in such establishment (1) consists in whole or in part of any filthy, putrid, or decomposed substance or (2) has been prepared, packed, or held under insanitary conditions whereby it may have become contaminated with filth, or whereby it may have been rendered injurious to health. A copy of such report shall be sent promptly to the Secretary.'

=== Addenda/amendments ===
It is possible that an error is discovered by the inspector(s) after issuing the 483. If the 483 was generated via Turbo EIR, then an amendment is created within that system. Else, an addendum is created. If possible, the investigator(s) will personally deliver the addendum/amendment to the firm.

Addenda/amendments are not normally used for adding observations to a 483 after the inspection has been closed out and the investigator(s) have left the premises.

== Public access to Form FDA 483s ==
Form 483s are available under the Freedom of Information Act, but may be redacted to remove non-public information. The FDA publishes select 483s on their website at this location:

ORA FOIA Electronic Reading Room

Some third parties query the FDA and publish a listing of Form FDA 483s issued since 2000.

As of 21-Nov-2009, the FDA is seeking input from the public "on whether inspection reports should be re-designed to separate out a summary or key findings page that could be made available to the public quickly." Responses from the public can be submitted on the FDA's web site.

== Trends in Form FDA 483 observations ==
Tabulations of the most-cited issues tend to be relatively stable from year to year. FY2012 data compiled by FDA's CDER shows that the top five items of concern were:

1. 211,22(d), Procedures not written, or are not fully followed
2. 211.192, Poor investigations of discrepancies or failures (CAPA) \
3. 211.100(a), Absence of written procedures
4. 211.160(b), Scientifically sound laboratory controls
5. 211.110(a), Control procedures to monitor and validate performance

By FY2019, the top items were:

1. 221.22(d), same as 2012
2. 221.192, same as 2012
3. 221.42(c), "facilities shall include defined areas of sufficient size"
4. 211.160(b), same as 2012
5. 221.166(a), "stability testing"
6. 211.100(a), was #3 in 2012

The fifth listed item in FY2012 (211.110(a)) had dropped to #12 by 2019.
