= Office of Criminal Investigations =

FDA investigation office

Law enforcement office overview
- Formed: 1991
- Type: Federal law enforcement
- Jurisdiction: United States
- Status: Active
- Employees: 113 Agents (approx.)
- Law enforcement office executive: Director
- Parent department: United States Food and Drug Administration
- Key documents: Federal Food, Drug, and Cosmetic Act; Federal Anti-Tampering Act

The United States Food and Drug Administration (FDA) Office of Criminal Investigations (OCI) provides the FDA with a specific office to conduct and coordinate its criminal investigations.

OCI special agents employ federal law enforcement methods and techniques in the investigation of suspected criminal violations of the Federal Food, Drug, and Cosmetic Act, the Federal Anti-Tampering Act, and other related federal statutes. OCI investigations concentrate on significant violations of these laws, with a priority on conduct that may present a large danger to the public health, The OCI is a relatively small agency, employing merely 180 Agents.

The FDA regulates approximately 25 cents of every dollar spent annually by Americans, the FDA is responsible for regulating products to ensure the safety of food, drugs, biological products, medical devices, cosmetics, radiation-emitting devices, and more.

Pursuant to its investigative mission, OCI maintains liaison and cooperative investigative efforts with various federal, state, local, and international law enforcement agencies. OCI is designated as the Agency's point of contact with the U.S. intelligence community as it relates to the Agency's counter-terrorism mission. OCI has representation at the Interpol U.S. National Central Bureau in Washington, D.C.

== History ==
In 1991, in the wake of the generic drug scandal, the commissioner of food and drugs announced the establishment of an Office of Criminal Investigations (OCI) within the Food and Drug Administration (FDA). This newly created law enforcement office, which was created with the support and urging of FDA's Congressional Oversight Committee, would conduct and coordinate criminal investigations of violations of the Federal Food, Drug, and Cosmetic Act (FDCA), the Federal Anti-Tampering Act (FATA), other related acts, and applicable violations of Title 18 of the United States Code.

=== Formation ===
In March 1992, the formation of OCI began when FDA selected Terry Vermillion, a career federal law enforcement officer, to serve as the founding Director of this new law enforcement office. To accomplish this, OCI selected experienced and trained managers, special agents, and technical and support staff from numerous federal law enforcement agencies and from within FDA. The management staff averaged over 22 years of federal law enforcement service and the special agents averaged 12 and 1/2 years of federal law enforcement experience.

=== First training center ===
In January 1993, OCI opened its first three field offices in Kansas City, Miami, and San Diego. The special agents hired to staff these offices received OCI and FDA specific training tailored expressly toward FDA's many areas of responsibility using the facilities located at the Federal Law Enforcement Training Center (FLETC). While the agents were attending training at FLETC, OCI was required to become operational in response to reports that several consumers across the nation were claiming they had found syringes in Diet Pepsi products. OCI deployed agents from the FLETC training course to lead the investigation of this nationwide tampering scare. The United States Attorney's offices recognized the serious ramifications of people making false tampering reports and provided their support for the OCI investigation. The resulting outcome of the investigation and the arrests of those making false tampering claims put a stop to the rash of tampering reports. In the end, over 60 individuals were successfully prosecuted for violation of the FATA.

=== Opening of offices ===
In the summer of 1993, OCI opened three more offices in Chicago, New York and Metropolitan Washington, D.C. Since opening six field offices in 1993, six resident offices and 26 domicile offices have become operational throughout the United States and Puerto Rico.

== Regulation ==
The FDA regulates approximately 25 cents of every dollar spent annually by American consumers. FDA is responsible for regulating products to ensure the safety of foods, prescription and over-the-counter drugs, biological products such as vaccines and blood, medical devices, cosmetics, radiation-emitting products, and more.

== Misconduct allegations ==
The agency has come under scrutiny on multiple occasions. In 2010, director Terry Vermillion stepped down after allegations surfaced that he had abused his power. In 2016, the agency was subject to scrutiny once again after Reuters news agency reported in a series of articles that the agency, under its new director George Karavetsos, had been potentially wasting resources by pursuing cases that lacked prosecutorial merit, often targeting legitimate drugs labelled for foreign countries and claiming that they were mislabelled.

According to Reuters, critics have argued that many of these cases posed little threat to public health and that many cases failed to show any clear signs of criminal intention on the part of the alleged perpetrators. Furthermore, evidence surfaced of agents acting in a threatening and aggressive manner. Shortly after Reuters published these articles, the House Committee on Energy and Commerce launched a review of the agency. The following January, under circumstances reminiscent of Vermillion's resignation in 2010, Karavetsos stepped down, not disclosing his reasons for doing so.

== Jurisdiction ==
Federal Food, Drug, and Cosmetic Act (FDCA) and other related Acts

- Title 21, United States Code, and related acts

Federal Anti-Tampering Act (FATA)

- Title 18, United States Code § 1365

FDA-OCI Agents have restricted arrest authority in comparison to most other federal agents. Pursuant to 21 U.S. Code § 372 (e)(4) arrests without a warrant made by OCI Agents must be related to Title 21.

== Violations ==
Since 1993, OCI has investigated thousands of criminal schemes involving the distribution of potentially dangerous FDA-regulated products. These investigations have involved a wide variety of criminal conduct, including street level distribution of counterfeit, unapproved, and designer drugs, major organized illicit diversion of prescription drugs, fraudulent schemes involving ineffective AIDS, cancer, and Alzheimer cures, large scale product substitution conspiracies, application and clinical investigator fraud, and health frauds involving harmful FDA-regulated drugs and medical devices.

As FDA's criminal law enforcement arm, OCI protects the American public by conducting criminal investigations of illegal activities involving FDA-regulated products, arresting those responsible, and bringing them before the Department of Justice for prosecution.

== Special agents ==
The Office of Criminal Investigations' (OCI) special agents use traditional law enforcement methods to collect evidence and ensure successful criminal prosecutions. An experienced staff of investigative analysts, technical equipment specialists, polygraph examiners, and special agents trained in computer forensics supports them. The office aims to protect the health and welfare of the public by investigating criminal allegations falling within the jurisdiction of the U.S. Food and Drug Administration (FDA).

OCI Special Agents are hired from a variety of federal law enforcement agencies, such as the U.S. Drug Enforcement Administration, Immigration and Customs Enforcement, the U.S. Secret Service, the U.S. Postal Inspection Service, the Federal Bureau of Investigation, the Bureau of Alcohol, Tobacco, Firearms and Explosives, and the Internal Revenue Service Criminal Investigations.

=== Powers and authority ===
Special agents have the federal statutory authority and capabilities to obtain and execute arrest and search warrants, carry firearms, and gather evidence to enforce the United States criminal law. They continue to receive instruction in areas designed to enhance job performance and promote career development. These areas include the FDA Food and Drug Law course, interviewing techniques, financial crimes, computer forensics, asset forfeiture, continuing legal education, Internet investigations, and management and leadership training.

As previously stated, reports have surfaced via Reuters news agency of certain agents engaging in threatening and aggressive behavior. One such incident occurred in April 2012 in Greeneville, Tennessee, when an OCI Special Agent raided an oncology clinic without a warrant and was unknowingly caught on a security camera making threatening remarks to one of the clinic's employees.

== See also ==
- Federal law enforcement in the United States
  - Drug Enforcement Administration
