= Stephen Ostroff =

American physician

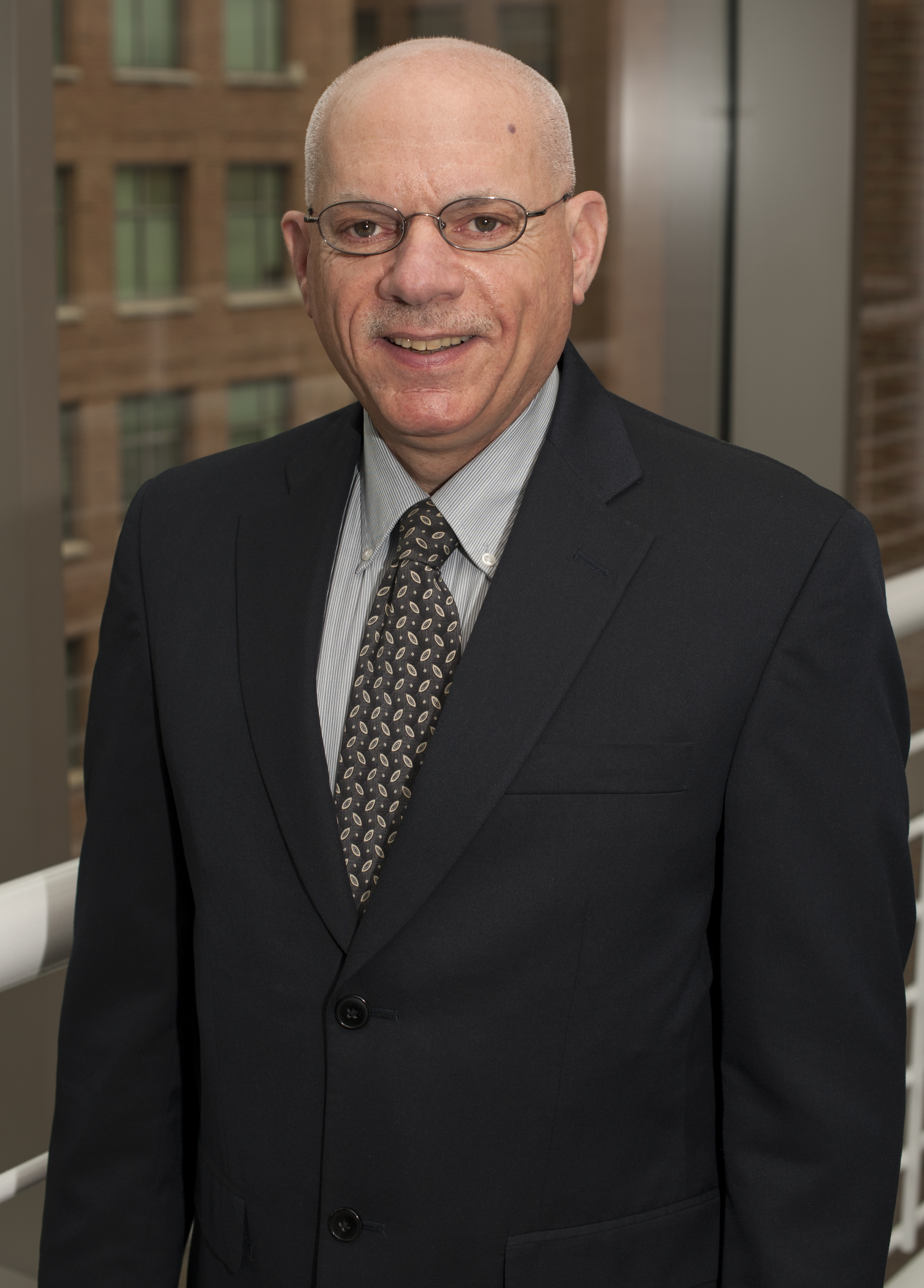

Acting Commissioner of Food and Drugs
- In office January 20, 2017 - May 11, 2017
- President: Donald Trump
- Preceded by: Robert Califf
- Succeeded by: Scott Gottlieb
- In office April 1, 2015 - February 22, 2016
- President: Barack Obama
- Preceded by: Margaret Hamburg
- Succeeded by: Robert Califf

Deputy Commissioner for Food and Veterinary Medicine
- In office April 1, 2015 – February 21, 2016
- President: Barack Obama
- Preceded by: Margaret Hamburg
- Succeeded by: Robert Califf

Personal details
- Born: Philadelphia, Pennsylvania, U.S.
- Education: University of Pennsylvania

Stephen Ostroff is an American physician. He served as acting commissioner of the U.S. Food and Drug Administration from April 1, 2015, to February 21, 2016, and from January to May 2017.

== Biography ==
Ostroff is a 1981 graduate of the University of Pennsylvania of Medicine. He completed residencies in internal medicine at the University of Colorado Health Sciences Center and in preventive medicine at Centers for Disease Control and Prevention (CDC). He worked at the CDC, the US Public Health Service, and at the Bureau of Epidemiology of Pennsylvania. In 2013, Ostroff joined the FDA as chief medical officer in the Center for Food Safety and Applied Nutrition and senior public health advisor to FDA's Office of Foods and Veterinary Medicine and was promoted to chief scientist in 2014.

Political offices
Preceded by Margaret Hamburg	Commissioner of Food and Drugs; Acting; 2015–2016	Succeeded by Robert Califf
