= Tracy Beth Høeg =

American sports medicine physician (born 1979)

Director of the Center for Drug Evaluation and Research
- Acting
- In office December 3, 2025 – May 15, 2026
- Deputy: Michael Davis
- Commissioner: Marty Makary; Kyle Diamantas (acting)
- Preceded by: Richard Pazdur
- Succeeded by: Michael Davis (acting)

Personal details
- Born: Tracy Beth Prachthauser; June 23, 1979 (age 47)
- Spouses: Paul Daniel O'Mara (m. 2006, divorced); Rasmus Høeg (after 2008)
- Children: 2
- Education: University of Wisconsin–Madison (BA); Medical College of Wisconsin (MD); University of Copenhagen (PhD)

Tracy Beth Høeg (née Prachthauser; born June 23, 1979) is an American sports medicine physician and epidemiologist who served as the acting director of the Center for Drug Evaluation and Research from 2025 to 2026.

== Early life and education (1979–2014) ==
Tracy Beth Prachthauser was born on June 23, 1979. Prachthauser attended the Swallow School in Merton, Wisconsin. She graduated from Arrowhead High School in June 1997 and from the University of Wisconsin–Madison with a Bachelor of Arts in the French language in August 2001. In March 2006, Prachthauser married Paul Daniel O'Mara. In February 2008 she married Rasmus Høeg. Their son was born the same month. Tracy studied medicine at the Medical College of Wisconsin and matched into an ophthalmology residency program, but dropped out after her pregnancy. She moved to Copenhagen with her husband and received a doctorate in public health and epidemiology from the University of Copenhagen.

== Career ==
=== Ultramarathon running research (2014–2020) ===
After graduating from the University of Copenhagen, Høeg began studying ultramarathon medicine, owing to her own experience; she competed for a U.S. national running team in 2013 and for a Danish team in 2018. Her work involved vision loss in runners and the effects of pregnancy on running. While competing in the Western States Endurance Run, Høeg connected with researchers at the University of California, Davis, where she received a physical medicine and rehab residency position. Her appointment elapsed in June 2022.

=== COVID-19 pandemic research (2020–2025) ===
In the onset of the COVID-19 pandemic, Høeg became a critic of school closures, favoring the open schools policies implemented by Scandinavian countries. In January 2021, she was the senior author of a study published by the Centers for Disease Control and Prevention that indicated limited transmission of COVID-19 in seventeen rural schools in Wisconsin. Høeg authored a study that examined incidents of myocarditis in young men who received the Pfizer–BioNTech COVID-19 vaccine. She later advised Florida surgeon general Joseph Ladapo. In November 2022, Høeg and four other physicians sued California over a law preventing doctors from espousing COVID-19 misinformation.

=== Makary advisorship (April–December 2025) ===
In April 2025, Reuters reported that Høeg had become a special assistant to Marty Makary, the commissioner of food and drugs.

== Acting Director of the Center for Drug Evaluation and Research (2025–2026) ==
On December 3, 2025, Høeg was named the acting director of the Center for Drug Evaluation and Research, succeeding Richard Pazdur. At a Advisory Committee on Immunization Practices meeting to discuss Hepatitis B vaccine guidance, Høeg argued that the vaccine should not be given to children, citing countries that do not recommend the vaccine to newborns, including Denmark. On May 15, 2026, Høeg was removed.
