= Paul Dunbar =

Paul Dunbar may refer to:

- Paul Laurence Dunbar (1872–1906), American poet, novelist, and playwright
- Paul B. Dunbar (1882–1968), American chemist
