= Høeg =

Høeg is a surname, and may refer to:

- Carsten Høeg, Danish academic
- Kaare Høeg, Norwegian engineer
- Marie Høeg (1866–1949), Norwegian photographer and suffragist
- Ove Arbo Høeg, Norwegian botanist
- Peter Høeg, Danish writer
- Tracy Beth Høeg, American physician
