= Walter G. Campbell (chemist) =

Commissioner of Food and Drugs

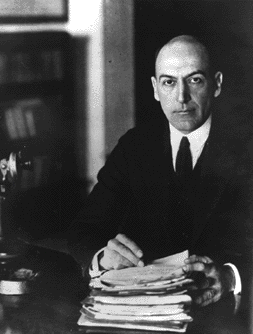

3rd Commissioner of Food and Drugs
- In office July 1, 1927 – April 30, 1944
- President: Calvin Coolidge; Herbert Hoover; Franklin D. Roosevelt
- Preceded by: Charles Albert Browne Jr.
- Succeeded by: Paul B. Dunbar
- In office July 16, 1921 – June 30, 1924
- President: Warren G. Harding; Calvin Coolidge
- Preceded by: Carl L. Alsberg
- Succeeded by: Charles Albert Browne Jr.

Personal details
- Born: November 8, 1877 Knox County, Kentucky, US
- Died: March 20, 1963 (aged 85) Orlando, Florida, US
- Party: Republican

Walter G. Campbell (November 8, 1877 – March 20, 1963) was an American chemist who served as Commissioner of Food and Drugs from 1921 to 1924 and from 1927 to 1944.

== Early life ==
Campbell was born in Knox County, Kentucky in November 1877. He studied at the University of Kentucky, being awarded his Bachelor's degree in 1902. He studied law at the University of Louisville, graduating in 1906.

== Career ==
Following his graduation, Campbell was retained by the Kentucky Experiment Station, helping enforce Kentucky's state food and drug laws.

In 1907, he underwent an examination to become an inspector under the Pure Food and Drug Act.
