= Charles W. Crawford (chemist) =

Commissioner of Food and Drugs

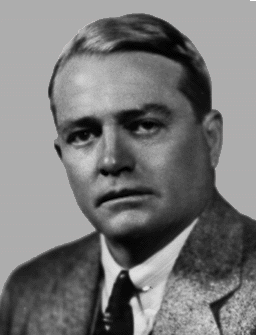

6th Commissioner of Food and Drugs
- In office June 1, 1951 – July 31, 1954
- President: Harry S. Truman; Dwight D. Eisenhower
- Preceded by: Paul B. Dunbar
- Succeeded by: George P. Larrick

Personal details
- Born: July 21, 1888 Lorena, Texas, U.S.
- Died: September 15, 1957 (aged 69) San Francisco, California, U.S.
- Party: Democratic
- Education: Oklahoma A&M University

Charles W. Crawford (July 21, 1888 – September 15, 1957) was an American chemist who served as Commissioner of Food and Drugs from 1951 to 1954. He graduated Oklahoma A&M University with a BA degree in chemistry in 1909. He later received a master's degree in 1915. He quickly became the FDA's principal representative during the drafting of the 1938 Food, Drug, and Cosmetic Act.
