= Scott Gottlieb =

American physician and government administrator (born 1972)

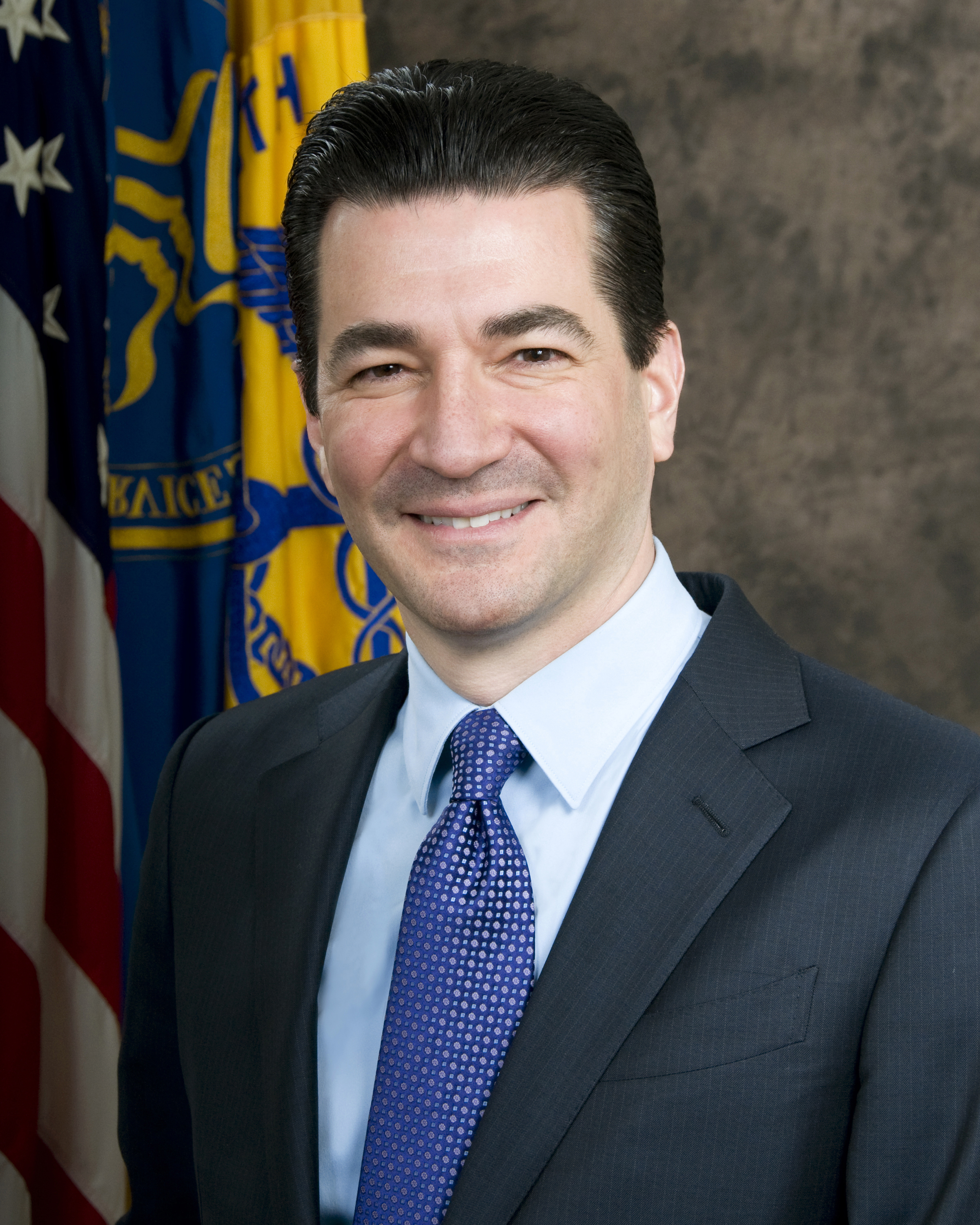
- Gottlieb in 2017

23rd Commissioner of Food and Drugs
- In office May 11, 2017 – April 5, 2019
- President: Donald Trump
- Deputy: Anna Abram
- Preceded by: Robert Califf
- Succeeded by: Norman Sharpless

Personal details
- Born: June 11, 1972 (age 54) East Brunswick, New Jersey, U.S.
- Party: Republican
- Education: Wesleyan University (BA); Mount Sinai School of Medicine (MD)

Scott Gottlieb (born June 11, 1972) is an American physician and investor who served as the 23rd commissioner of the Food and Drug Administration (FDA) from 2017-2019. As of June 2026, he is a senior fellow at the conservative think tank the American Enterprise Institute (AEI); a partner at the venture capital firm New Enterprise Associates (NEA); and a member of the board of directors of the pharmaceutical company Pfizer, Inc, the health insurance company UnitedHealth Group, and the gene sequencing company Illumina, Inc. Gottlieb is a contributor to cable financial news network CNBC and the CBS News program Face the Nation. An elected member of the National Academy of Medicine, he is the author of The New York Times best selling book Uncontrolled Spread on the COVID-19 pandemic and the national security vulnerabilities that it revealed.

Before becoming FDA Commissioner, he was a Clinical Assistant Professor at New York University Grossman School of Medicine, the FDA's Deputy Commissioner for Medical and Scientific Affairs, a venture partner with New Enterprise Associates (NEA) from 2007 to 2017, a member of the policy board of the Leukemia & Lymphoma Society, a senior official at the Centers for Medicare & Medicaid Services, and a member of the Federal Health Information Technology Policy Committee, which advises the United States Department of Health and Human Services on healthcare information technology.

== Early life and education ==
Gottlieb grew up in East Brunswick, New Jersey, the son of Stanley, who was a psychiatrist, and Marsha Gottlieb, who was a schoolteacher. His family is Jewish. He is a graduate of East Brunswick High School and received his bachelor's degree in economics from Wesleyan University. After completing his undergraduate education, he worked as a healthcare analyst at the investment bank Alex. Brown & Sons in Baltimore. Gottlieb attended medical school at Icahn School of Medicine at Mount Sinai and completed his residency in internal medicine at the Mount Sinai Hospital. ].

== Career ==
=== FDA and CMS (2003–2007) ===
Gottlieb worked for the U.S. Food and Drug Administration (FDA) from 2002 to 2003 and 2005 to 2007. He first served as a senior advisor to the FDA Commissioner and then as the FDA's Director of Medical Policy Development from 2002 to 2003. He helped initiate the FDA's generic drug user fee program and the Physician Labeling Rule. He worked on development of the FDA's policies related to the tentative approval of fixed-dose combination drugs for the treatment of HIV/AIDS under the PEPFAR program. He left the FDA in the spring of 2003 to become a senior advisor to the Administrator of the Centers for Medicare & Medicaid Services (CMS), where he worked on implementation of the Medicare Prescription Drug, Improvement, and Modernization Act (MMA), with its new Part D drug benefit, and helped advance the agency's coverage policies related to new medical technology.

He returned to the FDA from 2005 to 2007 as the agency's Deputy Commissioner for Medical and Scientific Affairs, where he was appointed to the Senior Executive Service and granted a top secret security clearance. He was a member of the Biodefense Interagency Working Group to help draft a strategic plan for U.S. biodefense countermeasures. He also worked on advancing a framework for the creation of a generic drug user fee program, final implementation of the physician labelling and pregnancy labelling rules, and pandemic preparedness. In that latter role, Gottlieb recused himself from parts of the planning effort on a bird flu vaccine in 2005, because he had done consulting work for GSK, whose products might be used.

=== Private sector (2007–2017) ===
Gottlieb practiced internal medicine as an attending physician at New York University's Tisch Hospital in New York City. In 2007, Gottlieb became a venture partner at New Enterprise Associates (NEA), the world's largest venture capital firm by assets under management. Gottlieb served as an active investing partner in the firm's healthcare division. He served on the boards of directors of several NEA portfolio companies, including Bravo Health (a Medicare Advantage health plan) and American Pathology Partners (a specialized anatomical pathology service provider). Gottlieb remained at NEA from 2007 until his appointment to be FDA Commissioner in May 2017.

Prior to becoming FDA Commissioner, Gottlieb testified about 20 times before committees of the United States House of Representatives and the United States Senate on issues related to FDA regulation and drug competition, drug shortages, Medicare reimbursement and healthcare reform and medical innovation. During congressional investigations of the rise of the price of EpiPen, Gottlieb presented testimony arguing that the generic drug industry is burdened by regulation that slows the development and review of new generic drug applications. These regulations, he argued, made it especially hard to bring forward generic equivalents of complex drugs, including hard-to-formulate medicines and drugs coupled to a device delivery system—a category of medicines that includes EpiPen. He argued that such excessive regulations "undermine the competitive opportunities that could help inspire more choice and competition, and help lower costs."

Gottlieb was an independent director at Tolero Pharmaceuticals and Daiichi Sankyo Inc. and a member of GlaxoSmithKline's product investment board, which made decisions on which drugs GSK would take forward in development. He was a senior healthcare advisor to BDO and also a partner at a merchant bank with a focus on healthcare. In 2015, he served on the board one of the investment firm's portfolio companies that was a provider of vaping products, Kure Corp. During this time, Gottlieb was a regular contributor to the Wall Street Journal editorial page and published a regular feature in Forbes related to healthcare and medical innovation, and he served on the editorial board of the Food and Drug Law Institute's publication entitled Food and Drug Policy Forum that "provides for the exchange of ideas and recommendations on state, national, and international food and drug law and policy issues" and serves as a forum for discussion of regulatory policy in the food, drug, and medical device industry.

=== FDA commissioner (2017–2019) ===
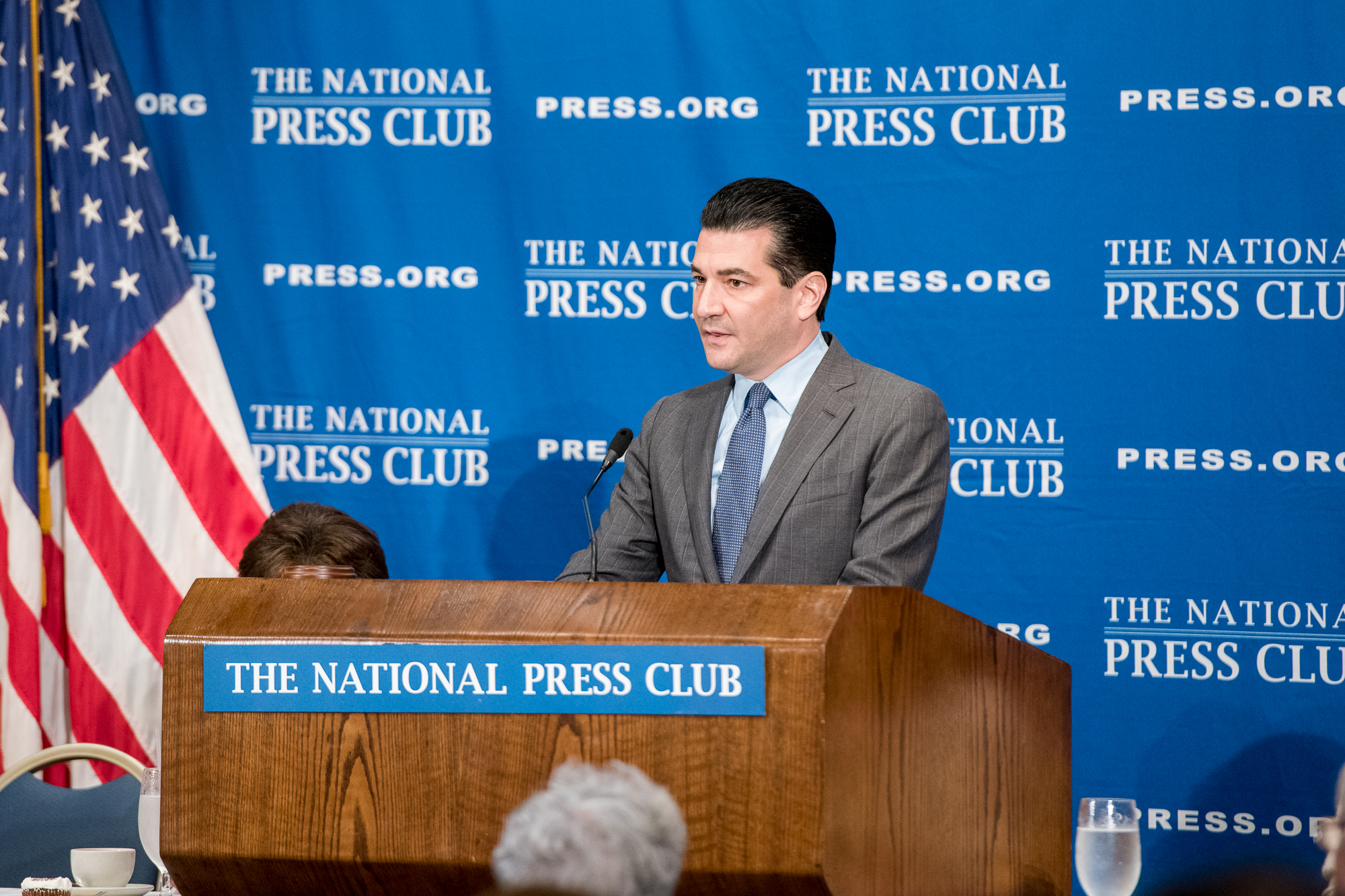
Gottlieb speaks at the National Press Club in 2017

Starting in summer 2016, Gottlieb worked as an advisor to Donald Trump's presidential campaign, and then as a member of his transition team. He previously advised the 2016 presidential campaign of Wisconsin Governor Scott Walker.

He was nominated as FDA Commissioner in March 2017. In advance of confirmation, Gottlieb expressed his intention to recuse himself "for one year from any agency decisions involving about 20 health care companies he worked with" under an ethics agreement, including such companies as Vertex Pharmaceuticals, GSK, Bristol Myers Squibb, and New Enterprise Associates. Politico reported that Gottlieb was "expected to push the boundaries of FDA reviews and using new authority" to streamline approvals using the 21st Century Cures Act. He testified before the Senate Committee on Health, Education, Labor and Pensions. There, Gottlieb equated the spread of opioid addiction with earlier epidemics of Ebola and Zika. Supporting the nominee and addressing the opioid crisis on the Senate floor before the confirmation vote, Majority Leader Mitch McConnell said in part, "I'm sure he'll be an ally to states that continue to struggle" with the crisis "because the FDA has a critical role to play." On May 9, 2017, he was confirmed by the Senate by a vote of 57–42, and he was sworn in on May 11, 2017.

As Commissioner, Gottlieb displayed "a collaborative management style, seeming to allay the concerns of some career employees who had balked at his industry ties," according to The New York Times. While Commissioner, Gottlieb testified before Congress 19 times.

On June 8, 2017, Gottlieb requested the market withdrawal of the opioid Opana ER, based on a risk associated with the illicit use of the product when the drug was inappropriately reformulated for abuse through injection. It was the first time the FDA sought to withdraw a product based on a risk associated entirely with the illicit use of a medical product. FDA later sought, and received, authority that Gottlieb had requested from Congress to be able to require the market withdrawal of opioid drugs when the agency had safety concerns that arose as a result of the illicit use of opioid drugs.

On July 28, 2017, Gottlieb delayed application deadlines on new tobacco products, including premium cigars and electronic cigarettes, to provide sufficient time to finalize regulations on how those products would be regulated by the FDA, and at the same time, announced that the FDA would take steps to regulate nicotine levels in combustible cigarettes to render the combustible cigarettes "minimally or non-addictive," and to regulate flavored tobacco products, including menthol cigarettes. The announcement caused shares of tobacco company Altria that day to initially decline by 19%.

Gottlieb approved the first gene therapy product in the U.S. on August 30, 2017, the drug tisagenlecleucel (KYMRIAH, Novartis Pharmaceuticals Corp.) for the treatment of patients up to age 25 years with B-cell precursor acute lymphoblastic leukemia (ALL) that is refractory or in second or later relapse.

In December 2017, Gottlieb unveiled a policy to step up FDA's oversight of homeopathic drugs, which had previously gone largely unregulated. At the same time, the FDA issued a series of warning letters seeking to remove certain unsafe and violative homeopathic products from the market.

In March 2018, the FDA, under Gottlieb, initiated a rule to lower the amount of nicotine in cigarettes to make them less addictive—in "an unprecedented move by the agency… It's the boldest move yet against cigarette makers by the FDA, which only obtained permission to regulate tobacco products in 2009."

In August 2017, Gottlieb announced an initiative to accelerate the development of cell based therapies while also taking actions to crack down on what he called "unscrupulous" actors who were marketing unregulated stem cell therapy products that had caused some patients harm. Many of the companies that the FDA cited had been performing liposuction to remove fat from patients, isolating stem cells and then injecting those cells back into the same patients to treat various ailments. In May 2018, Gottlieb asked federal courts on opposite sides of the country to permanently stop two stem cell companies from operating after reports of patients being blinded by their treatments and released new guidelines on how the FDA would set enforcement priorities.

Gottlieb also announced an initiative to accelerate development of FDA regulated cell and gene therapies in anticipation of a surge of new applications for commercial products. Among other things, Gottlieb said the FDA would add 50 additional reviewers to its staff, and issue new guidance documents that would lay out the pathway for development of different kinds of products such as gene therapies for inherited blood disorders and neurodegenerative diseases. In 2019, Gottlieb estimated that, by 2025, the FDA would be approving 10–20 cell and gene therapy products a year based on an assessment of the current pipeline and the clinical success rates of these products; a prediction that largely bore true.

In September 2018, citing an epidemic of use of electronic cigarettes by teenagers, Gottlieb announced that the FDA would seek to ban flavors in e-cigs as a way to reduce their appeal to youth. On November 8, 2018, it was reported that the FDA was "expected to announce a ban on the sale of most flavored e-cigarettes in tens of thousands of convenience stores and gas stations across the country", according to senior agency officials, and "the agency will also impose such rules as age-verification requirements for online sales." The reports noted that "Gottlieb also is expected to propose banning menthol in regular cigarettes. The agency has been collecting public comments on such a prohibition, which is a major goal of the public health community but is likely to be strongly opposed by the cigarette industry." It was also reported that Gottlieb would seek to ban flavors in cigars. Gottlieb stated, "I will not allow a generation of children to become addicted to nicotine through e-cigarettes." with The Washington Post editorializing that the new rules "represent an extraordinary step in the fight against nicotine addiction, one that, if successful, would become one of the nation's greatest public-health victories." That policy was formally unveiled in March 2019. Gottlieb also called into question the motives behind the decision by Altria to take a minority stake in Juul and accused the manufacturer of reneging on commitments and representations it had made to FDA.

Gottlieb pursued policies to address barriers to the approval of complex generic drugs, including generic, functionally equivalent alternatives to EpiPen. Under his leadership, in August 2018, the FDA approved the first generic competitor of EpiPen, and later, in January 2019, the agency approved a generic competitor to the asthma drug Advair. Of the agency's more than 1,000 generic approvals in 2018, about 14 percent were for "complex generic drugs," or drugs that are particularly difficult to "genericize."

In November 2018, the FDA implemented a new framework, in collaboration with the Department of Defense, to expedite the development of medical products intended to support American soldiers on the battlefield. Gottlieb had fought to maintain FDA control over the review and approval of medical products intended to support the war fighter after the Pentagon had sought to acquire that authority for itself as part of the National Defense Authorization Act. "I'm fully committed to trying to expedite products for the war fighter, and ... if they pass the language that has been put forward — the alternative language — we will commit to very quickly putting in place the implementing guidance to stand up that process," Gottlieb said as the Pentagon's version of the provision was moving through the House and the Senate. Ultimately, the compromise was to retain the authority with the FDA but for the FDA to commit to offer products intended for the battlefield a higher priority of review, reflecting the compromise provision that Gottlieb had put forward. The episode exposed an unusual "turf war" that pitted Gottlieb and the FDA against Pentagon officials and "puts on public display an internal rift within the administration and in Republican congressional ranks."

Gottlieb advanced initiatives on addressing drug pricing, "in ways that the agency hasn't done before." In December 2018, Gottlieb announced a plan to transition the biologicals currently regulated as drugs, including insulin, to be regulated under the Public Health Services Act as a way to open up these drugs to competition from lower cost biosimilars.

He also committed to make fighting opioid addiction one of his highest priorities as Commissioner. He announced that the FDA would pursue a comparative approval standard for new opioids seeking to come to market, arguing that new opioid painkillers should show advantages over existing opioid drugs to win FDA approval. He undertook a series of new steps to rationalize prescribing as a way to reduce exposure to opioid drugs in order to cut the rate of new addiction. Under Gottlieb's leadership, "The FDA stirred up a hornet's nest with an unprecedented request to Endo International to remove voluntarily its opioid pain medication, a tamper-resistant reformulation of Opana ER (oxymorphone hydrochloride), from the market."

In February 2019, Gottlieb took action to curtail the marketing of 17 dietary supplements that were making unlawful and unproven medical claims to treat Alzheimer's disease and, at the same time, unveiled a set of policy steps to strengthen the FDA's oversight of dietary supplements that was billed as the most significant modernization of the agency's regulation of supplements in 25 years.

In Spring 2019, Gottlieb took a series of actions to create a new framework for the development and FDA oversight of artificial intelligence medical devices. The stated goal was to allow products that sought to make regulated medical claims to come to the market through a predictable, negotiable regulatory process.

In March 2019, Gottlieb pressed for the market withdrawal of certain cosmetics because they were found to contain asbestos, at the same time that he announced a set of new proposals to strengthen oversight of the cosmetics industry, winning praise from legislators who had been pressing for similar reforms.

On March 5, 2019, Gottlieb announced his resignation as FDA Commissioner, effective in about a month. He said that he wanted to spend more time with his family. At the time of his resignation, Politico observed, "FDA leaders have typically focused much of their attention on a handful of medical topics, but Gottlieb has been active and aggressive on many issues as commissioner without hewing to a strictly conservative or liberal ideology. It's an approach that's won him praise from many in the health sector, while garnering criticism from several of the targeted businesses like tobacco companies and the fast-growing e-cigarette industries."

Gottlieb was called "an unusually activist regulator in the Trump administration whose agenda touched everything from tobacco to trans-fats," and he "wasn't afraid to speak on topics normally seen as a third rail for a FDA commissioner, including drug pricing… His most high-profile advocacy came in the area of youth smoking, where he aggressively pressed e-cigarette manufacturers and retailers to halt marketing to teens." At the same time, other reports observed that Gottlieb left the FDA with some of his signature tobacco policies still awaiting full implementation, including his plans to ban menthol in cigarettes.

On March 13, 2019, Gottlieb moved to restrict sales of flavored e-cigarettes to try to reduce the soaring rate of teenage vaping. The agency issued a proposal requiring that stores sequester flavored e-cigarettes to areas off-limits to anyone under age 18. The proposal also called for banning the sale of many flavored cigars. Under the policy, the FDA would reserve the right to push companies to comply or remove their products from shelves.

On March 27, 2019, Gottlieb advanced a new federal rule stipulating, for the first time, that centers that provide mammograms to screen for breast cancer will have to tell women whether they have dense breast tissue, which can increase the risk of cancer and mask tumors. The rule marked the first changes proposed in 20 years to the FDA's regulations on mammography.

While commissioner, Gottlieb undertook a substantial expansion of the FDA's interdiction activities inside the international mail facilities, to expand the agency's ability to intercept opioids being shipped through the mail from places like China. He sought and received money from Congress to hire dozens of more staff to inspect 100,000 packages per year that had been flagged as suspicious by customs agents, up from a prior capacity of roughly 40,000. The FDA also launched a new collaboration with Customs and Border Protection to step up joint inspectional activities.

=== Private sector (2019–present) ===
Upon leaving the FDA, Gottlieb returned to the American Enterprise Institute. In May 2019, he returned to New Enterprise Associates as a partner in the firm's healthcare practice, where he helped lead the firm's investments in National Resilience, Comanche Biopharma, and Xaira Therapeutics; and joined the board of two additional NEA portfolio companies, Aetion, Inc. and Tempus AI. Gottlieb was elected as an independent member of the board of directors of Pfizer, Inc. in June 2019. He joined the Illumina, Inc. board of directors in February 2020 and the National Resilience, Inc. board of directors in November 2020, where he was one of the original venture investors. He is also a member of the boards of trustees of the Mount Sinai Health System and Wesleyan University. Gottlieb is a regular contributor to the Journal of the American Medical Association's Health Forum.

With the advent of the COVID-19 reaching the United States and a great deal of misinformation being presented or correct information not being presented, Gottlieb has spoken out with public information on the virus on many venues. On February 12, 2020, Gottlieb testified before the Senate Committee on Homeland Security and Governmental Affairs on preparedness for the novel coronavirus and future pandemic threats. On March 29, 2020, Gottlieb and several public health experts published "National Coronavirus Response: A Road Map to Reopening", providing specific actions for navigating through the current COVID-19 pandemic in the United States. Since April 2020, Gottlieb has advised several governors on the COVID-19 pandemic. He joined Maryland Governor Larry Hogan's COVID-19 response team and Massachusetts Governor Charlie Baker's COVID-19 advisory board. He has also advised Connecticut Governor Ned Lamont as a member of the Reopen Connecticut Advisory Group. On November 20, 2020, it was announced that Gottlieb would serve on Montana's Governor-elect Greg Gianforte's COVID-19 task force. Gottlieb was criticized by Substack author Alex Berenson for contacting Twitter; Berenson alleged it was to get him removed from the platform.

== Other professional activities ==
Gottlieb was a member of the Public Policy Committee to the Society of Hospital Medicine and an editorial board member of the journal Value Based Cancer Care. He served as an adviser to the National Comprehensive Cancer Network, the National Coalition for Cancer Survivorship. He is also a member of the advisory board to the Milken Institute's FasterCures and the National Institute for Health Care Management (NIHCM). Before first joining the FDA, and in between each of his three tours of government service, Gottlieb was a fellow at the American Enterprise Institute.

== Writing ==
Gottlieb was a staff writer of the British Medical Journal (The BMJ) from 1997 to 2005 and a senior editor of the Pulse section of the Journal of the American Medical Association (JAMA) from 1996 to 2001. He is a Contributor to the Journal of the American Medical Association's Health Forum and a regular contributor to the editorial page of The Wall Street Journal and The Washington Post and wrote regularly for Forbes. In 2020 and 2021, Gottlieb authored a weekly column for the editorial page of the Wall Street Journal. Many of his articles have addressed the intersection of public policy and the practice of medicine. Gottlieb was a frequent and early critic of the Patient Protection and Affordable Care Act. He wrote an editorial in The Wall Street Journal, on the day of the health plan's launch, predicting the ensuing problems with the healthcare.gov website. Gottlieb argued that studies showed some patients who received Medicaid had worse outcomes, including death, when they had certain conditions like head and neck cancer, compared to patients who had no insurance coverage at all. He observed that in these cases, uninsured patients had access to newer medicines through free patient assistance programs, whereas federal law prevented Medicaid patients from getting access to these free drug programs because they were enrolled in Medicaid. As a result, Medicaid patients depended on whether or not these newer and typically costlier medicines were covered by their state Medicaid programs, which, in the cases Gottlieb cited, were not available. Critics said that his article was based on "a classic misunderstanding: confusing correlation for causation," a limitation explicitly mentioned in papers he cited.

In October 2019, Gottlieb wrote a feature for the conservative editorial page of The Wall Street Journal, where he called for a "reckoning" when it comes to the impasse between state laws legalizing cannabis and the policy of federal prohibition that outlaws cannabis but is largely unenforced. In that op-ed, Gottlieb called for a pathway toward federal legalization of cannabis that would allow, among other reforms, easier access to the compound for research while exerting stricter and more uniform regulation over products. In a separate editorial writing in The Washington Post, Gottlieb called on Congress and the FDA to create a framework for the legal sale of regulated Cannabidiol (CBD), a chemical found in cannabis plants that is used to treat certain medical conditions.

In January 2020, Gottlieb wrote several articles warning about the spread of COVID-19 in the United States. On January 23, Gottlieb wrote an Op-Ed titled "What must be done to head off the coronavirus threat" in The Washington Post. On January 27, Gottlieb wrote an Op-Ed titled "We need to prepare for US outbreak of Wuhan coronavirus." and on January 28, Gottlieb and Luciana Borio wrote an opinion which appeared in the editorial opinion of The Wall Street Journal entitled "Act Now to Prevent an American Epidemic." In an Op Ed in the Washington Post in 2024 Gottlieb called for stricter federal regulation of high-risk laboratory research, and he was among those during the Covid pandemic who argued that the virus may have been the result of a lab leak.

Gottlieb examined the systemic shortcomings of the U.S. response to the COVID-19 pandemic in his new book, Uncontrolled Spread: Why COVID-19 Crushed Us and How We Can Defeat the Next Pandemic, which was released on September 21, 2021 by HarperCollins. Uncontrolled Spread debuted at No.5 on The New York Times Best Seller list for Hardcover Nonfiction and at No.6 for Combined Print & E-Book Nonfiction. The book also debuted at No.9 on The Wall Street Journal Best Seller list for Hardcover Nonfiction and No.8 on the Publishers Weekly hardcover Nonfiction Best Seller list.

== Recognition ==
- Fortune magazine identified Gottlieb as one of its 2018 "The World's 50 Greatest Leaders," ranking him number 6. The magazine stated "Gottlieb has gotten credit for being transparent about FDA steps—and, more important, for using his bully pulpit without being a bully." Fortune magazine selected Gottlieb again in its 2019 survey, ranking him number 50 among its "World's 50 Greatest Leaders."
- Time magazine named Gottlieb one of its "50 People Transforming Healthcare in 2018," noting that "Gottlieb gained supporters for grounding his tough policies in scientific evidence."
- In naming Gottlieb as one of its "50 Politicos for 2018," the publication Politico noted that "This isn't the Scott Gottlieb many people had expected. As a Bush administration official, the physician was an avowed free-marketer, leading liberals to worry he would aggressively try to dismantle the FDA's vast regulatory apparatus. But since his confirmation, as counterparts at other federal agencies have focused on overturning or undermining the rules they inherited, Gottlieb has struck a genuine balance at the FDA."
- In naming Gottlieb the "Most Influential Physician Executive and Leader" in its 2018 annual survey of 50 physician executives, Modern Healthcare noted that "an unprecedented level of transparency and public disclosure has garnered support from across the industry." In 2019, Modern Healthcare again named Gottlieb the most influential physician executive and leader, noting "Gottlieb accomplished a rare feat during his two-year tenure as head of the Food and Drug Administration—he earned praise from Republicans and Democrats alike." Modern Healthcare observed "although he stepped down in April, stakeholders hope the former commissioner's endeavors will live on and influence future agency heads."
- Modern Healthcare also named Gottlieb nineteenth in its survey of the 100 most influential people in healthcare, in 2018, fifty-fifth in 2019, and fifty-fourth in 2021.
- In October 2018, Gottlieb was elected a member of the National Academy of Medicine.
- The American Medical Association presented Gottlieb with its 2019 Dr. Nathan Davis Award for Outstanding Government Service.
- In May 2019, Gottlieb received an honorary Doctor of Science degree from the Icahn School of Medicine at Mount Sinai for "his commitment to improving the nation's health and for his work at the FDA, expediting the approval of treatments and drugs, and battling opioid addiction and the use of e-cigarettes by youth."
- In September 2019, Gottlieb received Cancer Research Leadership Award from Friends of Cancer Research in recognition of his leadership in the regulatory and scientific innovations.
- Gottlieb was recognized on Modern Healthcare's list of 50 Most Influential Clinical Executives for 2020. The magazine stated that Gottlieb "has maintained a high—and influential—profile. During the COVID-19 pandemic, he has been active in the media—both traditional and social—talking about a host of challenges facing the nation, from the supply chain to the importance of a test-trace-isolate protocol."
- Medical Marketing & Media (MM&M) and PRWeek recognized Gottlieb on their 2020 Health Influencer 50 list, ranking him number 4. They noted that "In a year that will likely be remembered for medical misinformation and the proliferation of science-deniers, Dr. Scott Gottlieb continues to stand out as one of the clearest and most direct communicators of all things health-related."
- Gottlieb was named one of "Washington's 2021 Most Influential People" by Washingtonian.
- In May 2021, Gottlieb received an honorary Doctor of Science degree from Wesleyan University in recognition of "his achievements in dealing with the opioid crisis, the epidemic use of electronic cigarettes, and drug pricing, as well as his willingness to speak up and educate others on the nature of the COVID-19 virus." In 2022, he was inducted into the East Brunswick High School "Hall of Fame," where he graduated in 1990.
- Gottlieb was recognized by Modern Healthcare as one of 2021's 100 Most Influential People in Healthcare.
- Mediaite recognized Gottlieb on their Most Influential in News Media 2021 list, ranking him number 24. They noted that Gottlieb "established himself as one of the most valuable experts to follow on the Covid-19 pandemic in 2021. Gottlieb's regular appearances on the CBS Sunday show Face the Nation, as well as CNBC's Squawk Box, were refreshing in their honesty and sharp analysis. Unlike many in the Covid pundit class, Gottlieb did not shy away from challenging orthodoxy. He also called out both sides of the aisle, blaming his former boss for politicizing Covid while blaming the Biden administration for its mixed messaging surrounding the pandemic."
- Gottlieb was named one of Washington, D.C.'s 500 Most Influential People Shaping Policy in 2022 and 2023 by Washingtonian.
- FiercePharma named Gottlieb one of "The 22 most influential people in the fight against COVID-19," noting that Gottlieb "emerged as an important and trusted voice" and "Through the pandemic, Gottlieb has been a vocal advocate of science and an eager educator explaining complex concepts about the virus, vaccines and treatments."
- He was the 2024 recipient of The Mount Sinai School of Medicine Alumni Special Recognition Award

== Personal life ==
Gottlieb is a survivor of Hodgkin lymphoma. He is married and has three daughters.

Political offices
Preceded by Robert Califf	23rd Commissioner of Food and Drugs; 2017–2019	Succeeded by Norman Sharpless; Acting
