= Stephen Hahn =

American physician (born 1960)

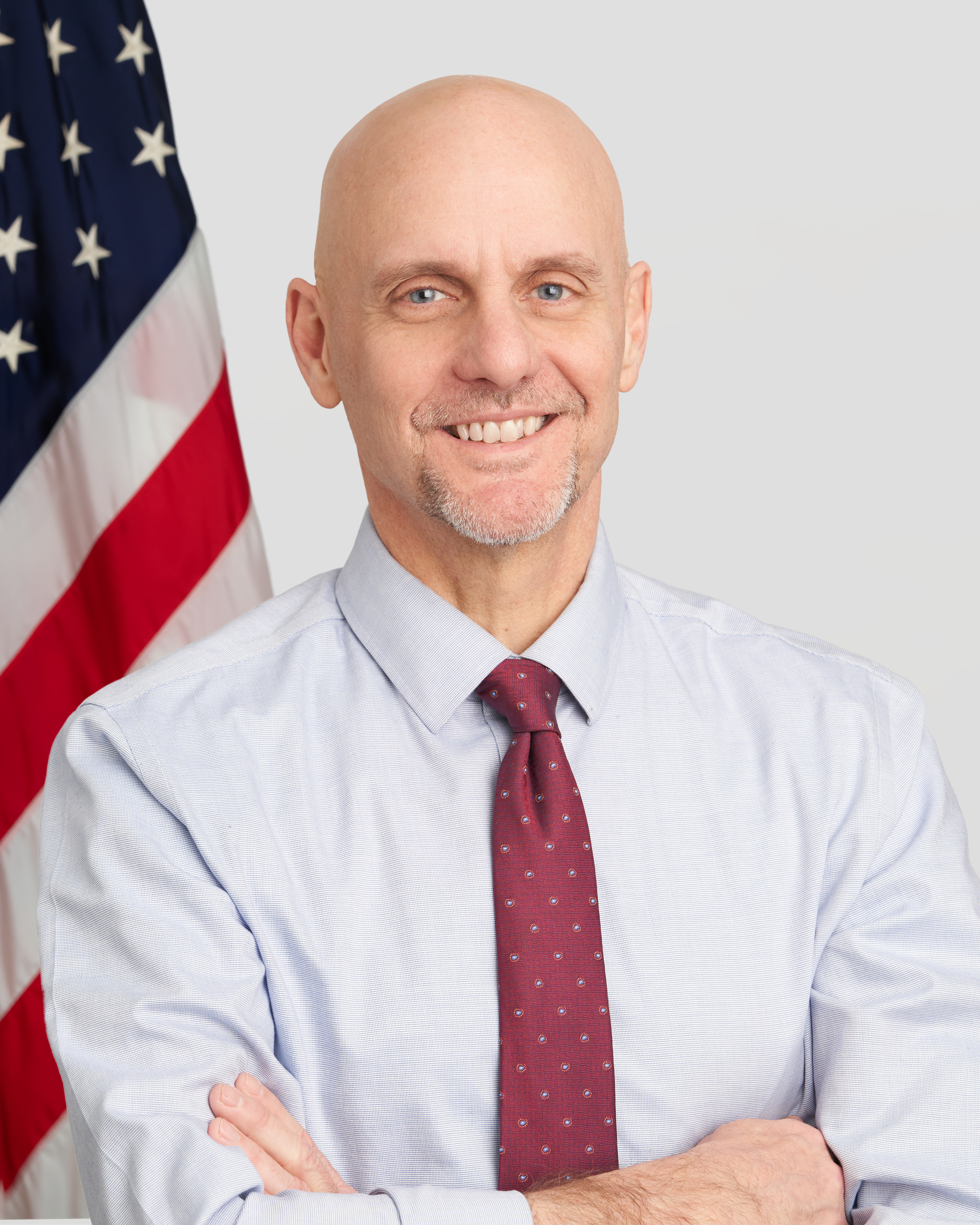
- Hahn in 2019

24th Commissioner of Food and Drugs
- In office December 17, 2019 – January 20, 2021
- President: Donald Trump
- Preceded by: Brett Giroir (acting)
- Succeeded by: Janet Woodcock (acting); Robert Califf

Personal details
- Born: January 22, 1960 (age 66)
- Education: Rice University (BA); Temple University (MD)

Stephen Michael Hahn (born January 22, 1960) is an American physician who served as the commissioner of food and drugs from 2019 to 2021. Before becoming commissioner, he was an oncologist serving as chief medical executive of the MD Anderson Cancer Center. In 2021, he became chief medical officer at Flagship Pioneering, the venture capital firm that launched Moderna.

== Education ==
Hahn received a BA in Biology from Rice University in 1980, and an MD from Temple University in 1984. After graduating from medical school, Hahn completed an internal medicine residency at the University of California, San Francisco School of Medicine where he eventually served as chief resident before embarking on a fellowship in medical oncology at the National Institutes of Health (NIH).

== Career ==
After completing his fellowship, Hahn worked as a radiation oncologist in Santa Rosa, California. He was then recruited by his mentor, Eli J. Glatstein to complete a separate residency in radiation oncology at the NIH between 1991 and 1994, where he eventually attained the rank of commander in the U.S. Public Health Service Commissioned Corps between 1989 and 1995. During the period of 1993–1999, he served as chief of NCI's Prostate Cancer Clinic in the Clinical Pharmacology Branch.

In 1996, Hahn joined the University of Pennsylvania School of Medicine as a radiation and medical oncologist as well as a researcher funded by the National Institutes of Health (NIH). As eventual Vice-Chair for Research in the Department of Radiation Oncology at Penn and Principal Investigator of National Cancer Institute grants, Hahn led the expansion of the Department's research base. In 2013, he was awarded status as a fellow in the American Society for Radiation Oncology (ASTRO). He then held the Department of Radiation Oncology's fourth endowed Henry Pancoast Professorship as Department Chair until 2014. During that time, Hahn assisted with the Department's scandal involving brachytherapy at the Veterans Affairs Hospital in Philadelphia, which was staffed with University of Pennsylvania faculty, all while securing increased research funding during a transition period in 2007-08 into the new Perelman Center for Advanced Medicine Robert's Proton Center, which remains the largest proton therapy center associated with a university teaching hospital in the world. Hahn remains Board Certified in Internal Medicine, Medical Oncology, and Radiation Oncology.

In 2015, Hahn became the chair of radiation oncology at the University of Texas MD Anderson Cancer Center in Houston, where he oversaw the Departments of Clinical Radiation Oncology, Radiation Physics, and Radiation Biology. In 2018, Hahn was appointed as the Chief Medical Executive of MD Anderson Cancer Center. During this period as an active clinician, Hahn specialized in treating thoracic, sarcomatous, and genitourinary cancers, as well as the use of photodynamic therapy for the treatment of pre-invasive and invasive malignancies.

=== U.S. Commissioner of Food and Drugs ===
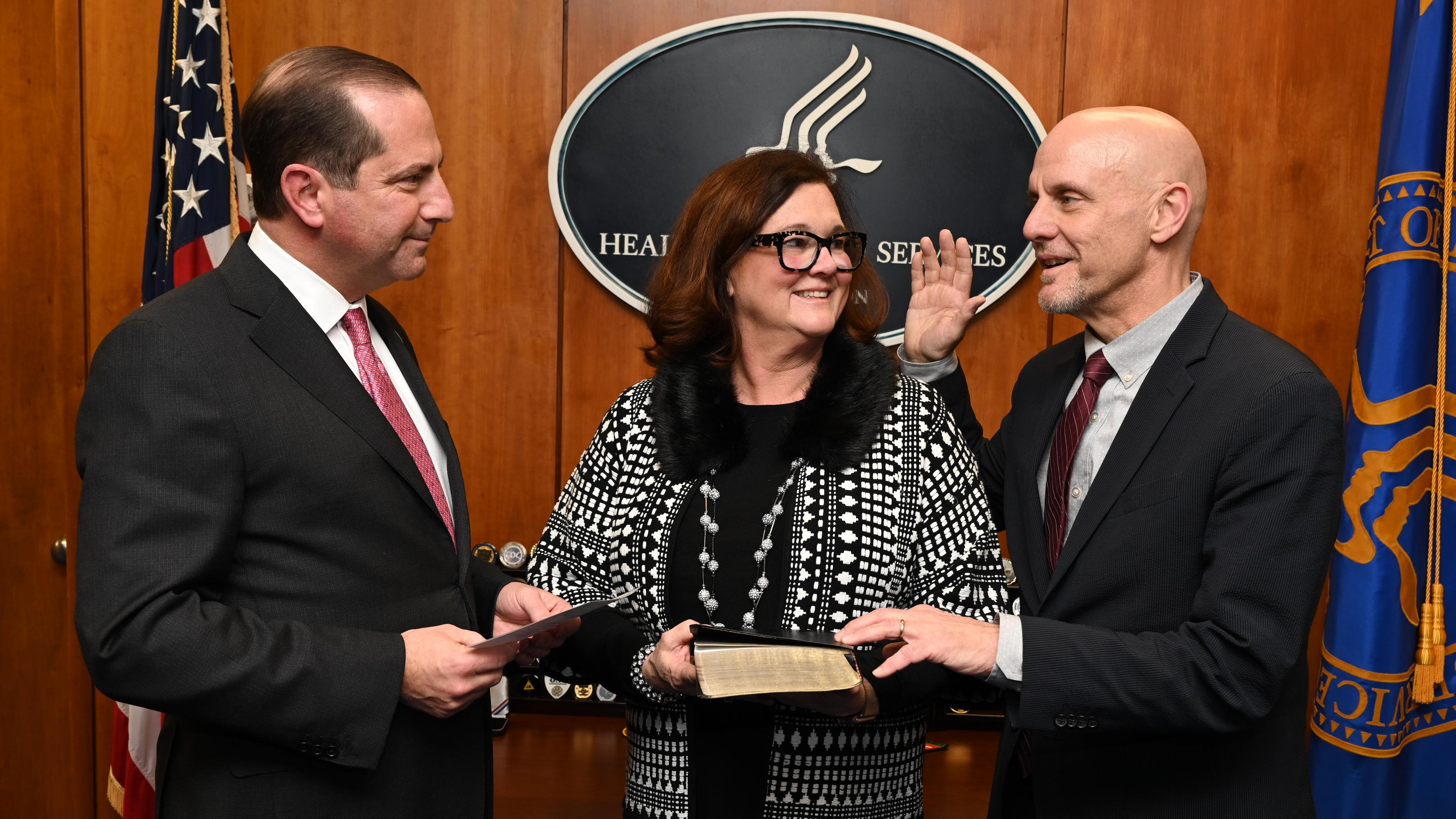
Hahn being sworn in on December 17, 2019

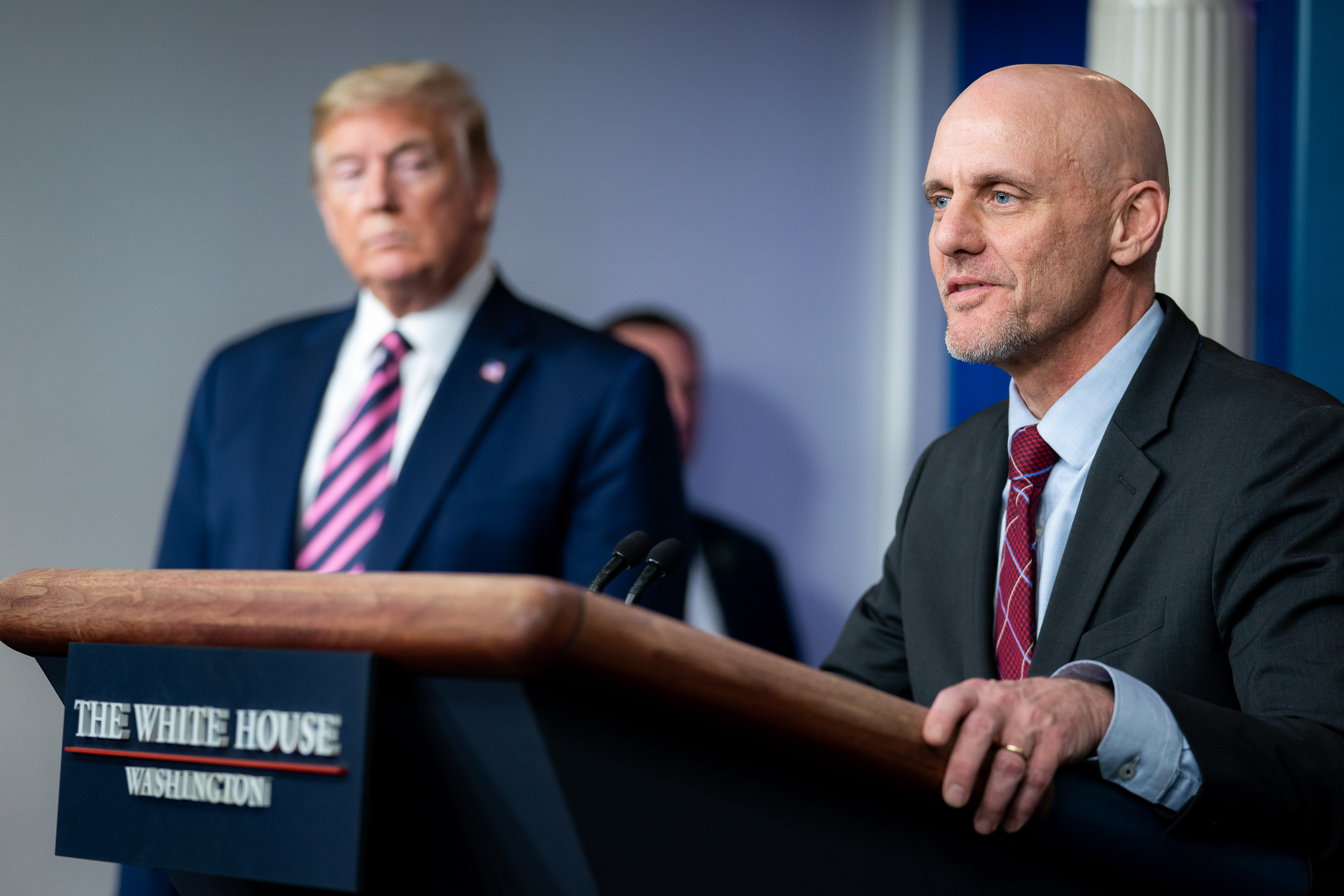
Hahn speaks to the White House press corps on the COVID-19 pandemic on April 24, 2020

On November 1, 2019, U.S. President Donald Trump announced his intent to nominate Hahn to be Commissioner of Food and Drugs Administration. On December 3, 2019, the Senate Health Education Labor and Pensions Committee voted 18 to 5 to advance the nomination to the Senate floor. On December 12, 2019, the Senate confirmed his nomination by a 72–18 vote. Hahn was sworn in on December 17, 2019.

Hahn has factored prominently in the Trump administration's response to the novel coronavirus pandemic in the United States, although the FDA under his administration has also been criticized for a lethargic response to the rapidly emerging outbreak in the United States. By November 2020, Hahn had gained the confidence of individuals concerned about the politicization of the agency.

On March 1, 2020, Vice President Mike Pence and Health and Human Services Secretary Alex Azar announced the addition of Hahn to the White House Coronavirus Task Force.

According to a whistleblower complaint filed by HHS infectious disease expert Rick Bright, in April 2020, Hahn instructed FEMA administrator Peter Gaynor "to distribute hydroxychloroquine to pharmacies nationwide," even though the emergency use authorization (EUA) issued by the FDA did not provide for outpatient use of hydroxychloroquine for COVID-19. Hydroxychloroquine was later linked to multiple deaths of COVID-19 patients, and the FDA revoked the EUA in June 2020.

On July 5, 2020, Hahn refused to defend Trump's false claim that 99% of coronavirus cases are "totally harmless"; in response to an interview question about the president's claim, Hahn said, "I'm not going to get into who is right and who is wrong."

On August 23, 2020, Hahn joined with Trump and Azar in announcing an emergency authorization for the use of coronavirus convalescent plasma in treating COVID-19. As with hydroxychloroquine, Trump publicly exerted major pressure on the FDA to approve convalescent plasma as a COVID-19 treatment, even suggesting that "deep state, or whoever over at the FDA" was blocking the authorization. The approval came a few days after Trump publicly complained that the agency was moving too slowly on plasma and suggested they might be delaying the approval for political reasons. In fact, the delay was due to concerns at the National Institutes of Health that the treatment's effectiveness had not been adequately demonstrated. Hahn has said that Trump "has asked FDA to cut back red tape and try to speed medical products into the hands of providers, patients and American consumers." In making the announcement Trump exaggerated plasma's effectiveness compared to the FDA's own assessment, and Hahn did not correct him. After coming under criticism from scientists and former FDA officials for echoing Trump's exaggerated claims about the benefits of convalescent plasma, Hahn issued an apology/correction, saying, "The criticism is entirely justified. What I should have said better is that the data show a relative risk reduction, not an absolute risk reduction."

The FDA was criticized in the beginning stages of the pandemic in the U.S. for moving slowly and bureaucratically in approving COVID-19 tests developed by laboratories, prompting concerns from academic medical centers and others. On February 29, 2020, the FDA allowed laboratories to begin using tests after validation, but still required emergency use authorization applications. Over the following months, the FDA approved many COVID-19 tests, including lab-developed and non-lab-developed tests. In August 2020, the Trump administration blocked the FDA from regulating COVID-19 tests and a wide array of other laboratory tests. The move was strongly opposed by Hahn and the FDA, and came after rising tensions between Hahn and Azar. The sudden move was criticized by public health experts, who stated the change could lead to more unreliable or defective coronavirus tests entering the market, and pointed out that testing shortages were by that point primarily attributable to shortages of swabs, chemical reagents, and other supplies, rather than a lack of approved tests.

After controversy over the hydroxychloroquine and plasma authorizations, Hahn transferred two political appointees from the top public relations and communications posts at the agency, replacing them with career civil servants on an acting basis. Emily Miller, the agency's top spokesperson, who had no prior medical or science experience, was removed on August 28 after just two weeks on the job. On September 2 John "Wolf" Wagner, a close ally of chief DHS spokesman Michael Caputo, was removed from his post as FDA's associate commissioner for external affairs after serving for two months.

Hahn left office on January 20, 2021. Six months later he assumed the role of chief medical officer of Flagship Pioneering, the venture firm behind Moderna.

== Memberships ==
Hahn is a member of the American Society of Clinical Oncology, American Society for Radiation Oncology, Radiation Research Society, American Society of Photobiology, American Association for Cancer Research, and the University of Pennsylvania's John Morgan Society.

== Personal life ==
Hahn has been married for more than 40 years and has four children, and 5 grandchildren.

Political offices
| Preceded by Brett Giroir; Acting | 24th Commissioner of Food and Drugs; 2019–2021 | Succeeded by Janet Woodcock (Acting); Robert Califf |
