= Sara Brenner =

American preventive medicine physician

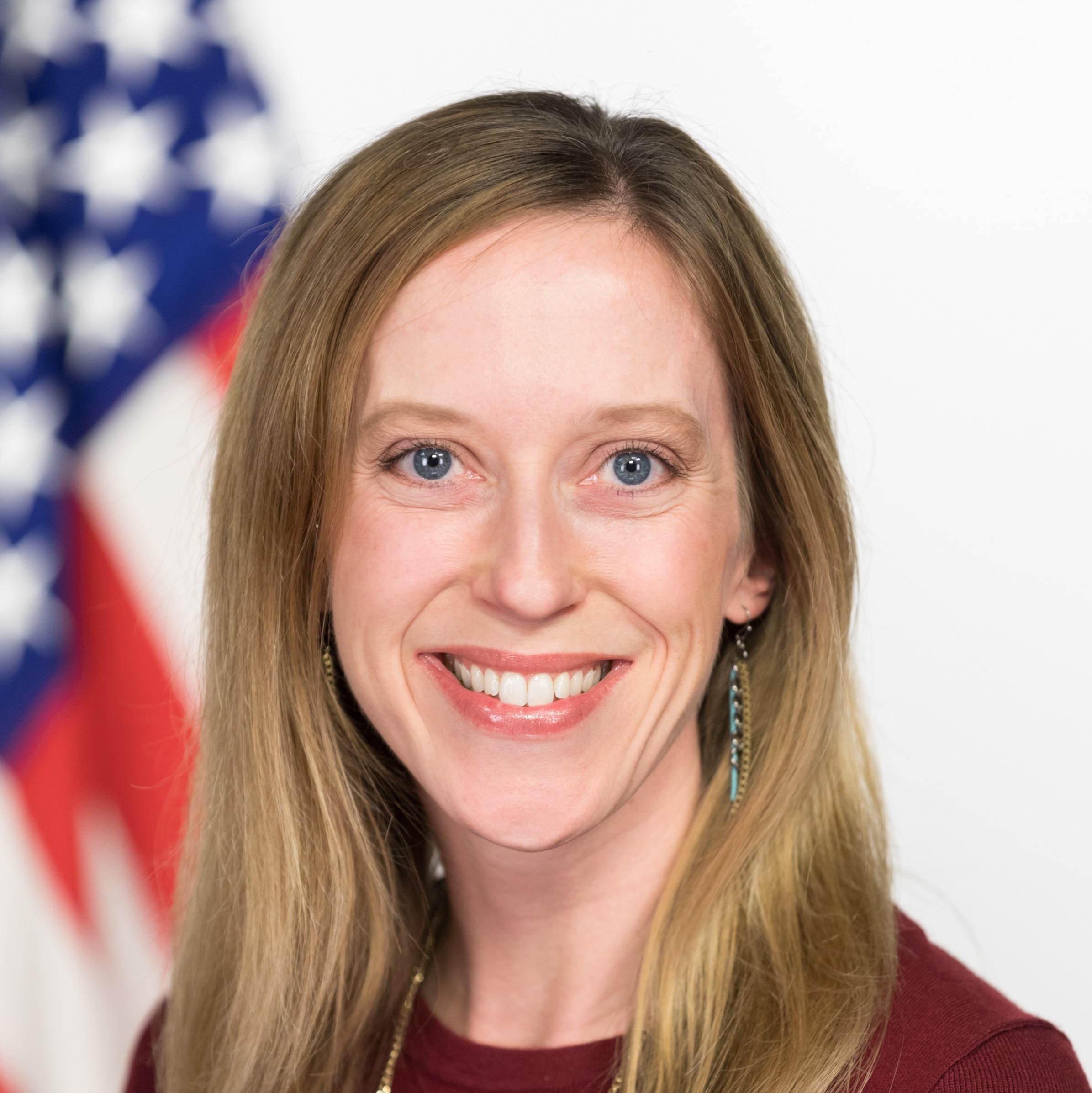
- Official portrait, 2018

Principal Deputy Commissioner of Food and Drugs
- In office April 1, 2025 – April 2026
- President: Donald Trump
- Preceded by: Namandjé Bumpus
- Succeeded by: Vacant

Acting Commissioner of Food and Drugs
- In office January 24, 2025 – April 1, 2025
- President: Donald Trump
- Preceded by: Robert Califf
- Succeeded by: Marty Makary

Personal details
- Party: Republican
- Education: Iowa State University (BS); University of Iowa (MD); University at Albany, SUNY (MPH)
- Scientific career
- Fields: Preventative medicine, public health, nanomedicine
- Workplaces: University at Albany, SUNY; Office of Science and Technology Policy; U.S. Food and Drug Administration

Sara Brenner is an American preventive medicine physician who served as the Principal Deputy Commissioner of Food and Drugs from 2025 to 2026, having previously served as acting commissioner of the U.S. Food and Drug Administration (FDA). She held roles in academia and federal health policy, including as a senior policy advisor in the Office of Science and Technology Policy.

== Education ==
Brenner graduated from Adel-DeSoto-Minburn High School in Adel, Iowa in 1998.

Brenner received a B.S. in genetics, with a minor in philosophy, from Iowa State University. She earned an M.D. from the Roy J. and Lucille A. Carver College of Medicine at the University of Iowa in 2006, and an M.P.H. in health policy and administration from the University at Albany, SUNY's School of Public Health.

Brenner completed her medical training in internal medicine at NorthShore University HealthSystem. She later specialized in preventive medicine and public health at the New York State Department of Health and SUNY Albany School of Public Health.

== Career ==
Brenner was a faculty member at the College of Nanotechnology, Science, and Engineering. She held multiple roles, including associate professor of nanobioscience, assistant vice president for nanohealth initiatives, and director of the MD–PhD program in nanomedicine. Her research focused on the applications of nanoscale and advanced materials in medicine and public health, as well as assessing the health impacts of exposure to engineered nanomaterials.

In 2016, she was included in the Albany Business Review's "40 under 40" list where she stated that her role was "never boring or predictable".

In 2018, Brenner joined the Office of Science and Technology Policy (OSTP) as a senior policy advisor, where she worked on biomedical science, health data interoperability, translational science, and the U.S. bioeconomy. She was also worked to address the opioid epidemic in the United States and veterans' suicide prevention.

In 2019, Brenner joined the U.S. Food and Drug Administration (FDA), serving in various capacities. As the chief medical officer for in vitro diagnostics and associate director for medical affairs within the FDA Center for Devices and Radiological Health, she contributed to regulatory compliance, policy development, and advancing the safety and effectiveness of medical devices. Brenner played a role in the COVID-19 response, focusing on diagnostics, data quality, and technological innovation across government agencies.

On January 24, 2025, Brenner was named acting commissioner of Food and Drugs at the FDA. She assumed this role following the departure of Robert Califf and served until Marty Makary became commissioner on April 1, 2025. Subsequently, Brenner served as Principal Deputy Commissioner of the FDA until April 2026.

Government offices
| Preceded by Robert Califf | Acting Commissioner of Food and Drugs; 2025 | Succeeded by Marty Makary |
