= Charles Albert Browne Jr. =

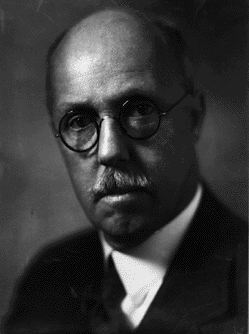

4th Commissioner of Food and Drugs
- In office July 1, 1924 – June 30, 1927
- President: Calvin Coolidge
- Preceded by: Walter G. Campbell
- Succeeded by: Walter G. Campbell

Personal details
- Born: August 12, 1870 North Adams, Massachusetts
- Died: February 3, 1947 (aged 76) Washington, D.C.
- Party: Republican

Charles Albert Browne Jr. (August 12, 1870 – February 3, 1947) was a sugar chemist and former head of the Bureau of Chemistry, which later became the Food and Drug Administration. He is also considered a leader in the study of the history of chemistry in North America.

== Early life and education ==
Charles Albert Browne Jr. was born in North Adams, Massachusetts, on August 12, 1870, the eldest of five children. His father, Charles Albert Browne Sr., was an inventor and held several patents dealing with explosive technologies including electric fuses. His father helped to apply these technologies during the construction of the Hoosac Tunnel near North Adams, where Charles grew up. In his youth, Charles assisted his father in conducting experiments which naturally aroused the boy's interest in chemistry.

Upon graduating from Drury High School in North Adams, Charles went on to attend nearby Williams College where he received a B.A and M.A. in 1892. In addition to studying chemistry, he became intensely interested in Greek Language - an interest that he pursued in parallel with chemistry throughout his life. He went on to do further study in the field of chemistry, and received his doctorate from The University of Göttingen in 1901.

== Family ==
In 1918, Charles Browne married Louise McDannell of Kentucky, herself a Ph.D. in chemistry – quite rare for a woman in that day and age. He once wrote jokingly that "I have been greatly blamed for causing her to abandon a very successful academic career". The Brownes had one daughter, Caroline Louise Browne (June 8, 1922 - November 29, 2007) who spent the majority of her life in and near Washington D.C, raising two children of her own.

== History of Chemistry ==
Browne was a close friend of Edgar Fahs Smith (1854–1928). In 1921, they announced the creation of a new section of the American Chemical Society, on the history of chemistry. In 1945, Browne donated around 450 items from his own collection to the Edgar Fahs Smith Memorial Library in the History of Chemistry, which was curated by Eva Armstrong.

Browne served on an Advisory Committee for the University of Pennsylvania, planning for the use of resources from the Smith Collection. The committee proposed the creation of an annual publication on the history of chemistry. Browne was appointed the first editor-in-chief of Chymia, the resulting journal, but died before its first issue appeared. He was succeeded as editor by Tenney L. Davis (1890–1949), who edited the first two issues. One of the first articles in Chymia was a memorial to Browne and his contributions to the history of chemistry.
