= Robert Califf =

American cardiologist (born 1951)

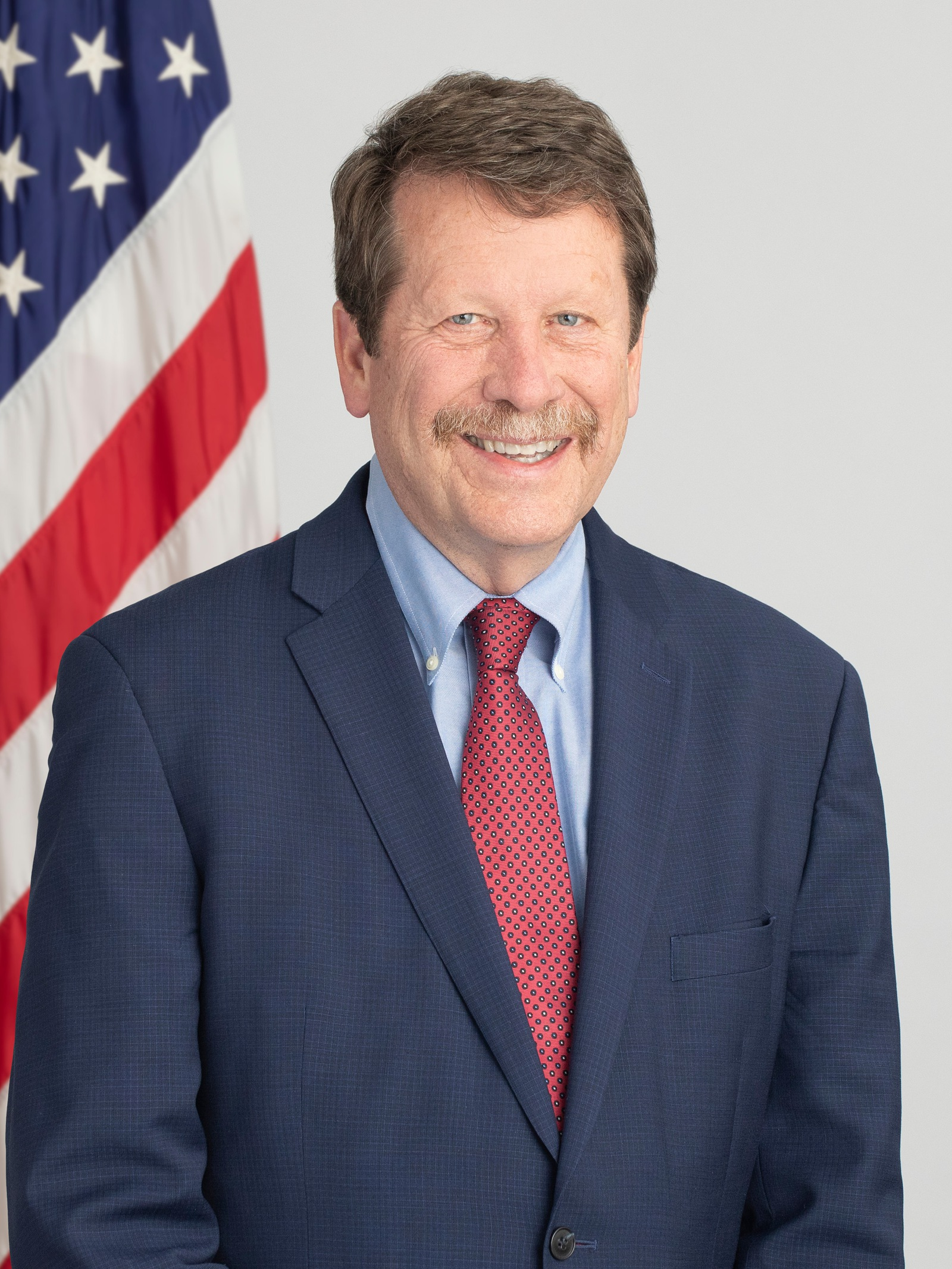
- Califf in 2022

23rd & 26th Commissioner of Food and Drugs
- In office February 17, 2022 – January 20, 2025
- President: Joe Biden
- Deputy: Janet Woodcock; Namandjé Bumpus
- Preceded by: Stephen Hahn
- Succeeded by: Marty Makary
- In office February 22, 2016 – January 20, 2017
- President: Barack Obama
- Preceded by: Margaret Hamburg
- Succeeded by: Scott Gottlieb

Personal details
- Born: 1951 (age 74–75) Anderson, South Carolina, U.S.
- Party: Democratic
- Education: Duke University (BS, MD)

Robert McKinnon Califf (born 1951) is an American cardiologist who served as the 25th commissioner of food and drugs from 2016 to 2017 and again from 2022 to 2025.

He was first nominated to be commissioner in September 2015 by President Barack Obama and he was confirmed by the U.S. Senate in February 2016, serving until January 20, 2017.

President Joe Biden renominated Califf to head the Food and Drug Administration on November 12, 2021. He was confirmed by the Senate on February 15, 2022.

Prior to becoming commissioner he had served as the deputy commissioner of the United States Food and Drug Administration's Office of Medical Products and Tobacco since January 2015. In 2019, he became head of medical strategy at Google's parent company, Alphabet Inc.

== Early life and education ==
Califf was born in Anderson, South Carolina. He attended high school in Columbia, South Carolina, where he was a member of the 1969 AAAA South Carolina Championship basketball team. He attended Duke University, graduating in 1973 summa cum laude and is a member of Phi Beta Kappa.

In 1978, he graduated from the Duke University School of Medicine in Durham, North Carolina, and was inducted into the Alpha Omega Alpha medical honor society. He left North Carolina for an internal medicine residency at the University of California, San Francisco and returned in 1980 to Duke to complete a fellowship in cardiology. He is board-certified in internal medicine (1984) and cardiology (1986), and a Master of the American College of Cardiology (2006).

== Career ==
=== Duke University ===
Califf was granted tenure as professor of cardiology at Duke University School of Medicine. He was the founding director of the Duke Clinical Research Institute, which is a large academic research organization with 1000 employees and an annual budget of $320 million, 50-60% of which is funded from the pharmaceutical industry.

=== Google ===
Califf led strategy and policy for Alphabet’s health subsidiaries. He was the full-time head of strategy and policy for its Verily Life Sciences and Google Health divisions.

Califf has led many clinical cardiology research studies, health outcomes research, health care quality, and translational research, which seeks to ensure that advances in science translate into medical care. He was a lead investigator in clinical trials testing the efficacy of the cholesterol-lowering drug combination ezetimibe/simvastatin.

As of 2015, he was vice-chancellor of clinical and translational research and the Duke Translational Medicine Institute (DTMI) director. Califf is recognized by the Institute for Scientific Information as one of the top 10 most cited medical authors, with more than 1,200 peer-reviewed publications.

=== Relationships with the pharmaceutical industry ===
Califf worked very closely with pharmaceutical companies at the Duke clinical trials center "convincing them to do large, expensive, and, for Duke, profitable clinical trials." He was a paid consultant for Merck Sharp & Dohme, Johnson & Johnson, GlaxoSmithKline, AstraZeneca, and Eli Lilly per ProPublica from 2009 to 2013. The largest consulting payment was $87,500 by Johnson & Johnson in 2012, and "most of funds for travel or consulting under $5,000", which has been called "minimal for a physician of his stature". From 2013 to 2014 he was paid a total of $52,796; the greatest amount being $6,450 from Merck Sharp & Dohme, followed by Amgen, F. Hoffmann-La Roche AG, Janssen Pharmaceutica, Daiichi Sankyo, Sanofi-Aventis, Bristol-Myers Squibb and AstraZeneca. He was a director of Portola Pharmaceuticals, Inc. from July 2012 to January 26, 2015, an advisor for Proventys, Inc., chairman of the medical advisory board of Regado Biosciences, Inc. and has been a member of that board since June 2, 2009, and a member of the clinical advisory board of Corgentech Inc. Forbes wrote that his close ties to the drug industry were why he was not nominated for the FDA Commissioner position in 2009. Califf's ties to the pharmaceutical industry were criticized by the magazine The American Prospect, and Democratic Senators Bernie Sanders and Joe Manchin, who announced their intention to vote against his 2021 renomination.

=== FDA under President Obama ===
In January 2015, Califf was appointed Deputy Commissioner of the United States Food and Drug Administration's Office of Medical Products and Tobacco, "second in scope only to being commissioner". In February 2015, Califf was cited as a possible successor to Margaret Hamburg, the outgoing commissioner of food and drugs. and in September 2015, President Barack Obama nominated him to be the next FDA commissioner. In February 2016, the US Senate confirmed Califf as commissioner of the Food and Drug Administration by a vote of 89-4. Califf stepped down from the post of FDA commissioner on January 20, 2017.

=== FDA under President Biden ===
On November 12, 2021, President Biden announced he was nominating Califf to return as head of the FDA. During his hearing before the Senate HELP committee on December 14, 2021, he was questioned relating to the pandemic, opioid crisis, and issues relating to abortion. Some Democrats opposed his nomination due to his corporate ties and the opioid crisis. Several Republican senators opposed his nomination because of issues relating to abortion.

On January 13, 2022, he was advanced out of committee by a 13-8 vote. On February 15, 2022, the Senate confirmed his nomination by a 50-46 vote. Califf assumed office on February 17, 2022.

== Memberships ==
He is a member of the Institute of Medicine (IOM). He was on the committees that recommended, for example, Medicare coverage of clinical trials and to remove ephedra from the market, and the committee on identifying and preventing medication errors. As of 2015, he is a member of the IOM Policy Committee and liaison to the Forum in Drug Discovery, Development, and Translation.

He served on the FDA Cardiorenal Advisory Panel and FDA Science Board's Subcommittee on Science and Technology.

Government offices
Preceded by Margaret Hamburg	Commissioner of Food and Drugs; 2016–2017	Succeeded by Scott Gottlieb
Preceded by Janet Woodcock; Acting	Commissioner of Food and Drugs; 2022–2025	Succeeded by Sara Brenner; Acting
