= American Pathology Partners =

Medical laboratory company in Nashville, Tennessee

American Pathology Partners, Inc.
- Company type: Private
- Industry: Healthcare
- Founded: 2008
- Founder: Thanasis Papaioanu, Edward Dooling, Martin Rash
- Headquarters: Nashville, Tennessee, U.S.
- Key people: Martin Rash (Chairman); Robert Mignatti (COO)
- Services: Clinical laboratory
- Number of employees: 280+
- Website: www.ap2.com

American Pathology Partners, Inc. (otherwise referred to as APP or AP2) is a privately held medical laboratory company headquartered in Nashville, Tennessee. The company operates a nationwide network of pathology laboratories focused on local and regional healthcare. APP serves physician offices, hospitals, and surgery centers with sub-specialized anatomic and molecular pathology services including surgical pathology, cytopathology, dermatopathology, hematopathology, urologic pathology, gastrointestinal and liver pathology, renal pathology, and pediatric and perinatal pathology. APP currently operates laboratory facilities in Denver, Colorado; Wilson, North Carolina; and West Palm Beach, Florida doing business as UniPath, Eastern Carolina Pathology, and Palm Beach Pathology in their respective geographies.

== History ==
APP was founded in 2007 and incorporated in February 2008 by laboratory professionals, Edward Dooling and Thanasis Papaioanu, along with hospital executive, Martin Rash. Edward Dooling was formerly a senior executive with AmeriPath (now part of Quest Diagnostics) and DIANON Systems, Inc., (now part of LabCorp). Thanasis Papaioanu was formerly an investment banker with SunTrust Equitable (now SunTrust Robinson Humphrey) and FTN Financial (part of First Tennessee National Corporation), where he helped launch New York-based laboratory CBLPath, Inc. (now part of Sonic Healthcare). Martin Rash is founder and Chairman/CEO of RegionalCare Hospital Partners; he was formerly founder and Chairman/CEO of publicly traded Province Healthcare Company that was acquired by Lifepoint Hospitals, Inc. (Nasdaq: LPNT) in 2005.

In April 2008, APP secured a $75 million equity commitment from New Enterprise Associates (NEA), a large private equity investment firm based in Menlo Park, California and Baltimore, Maryland.

On December 31, 2008, APP completed the acquisition of UniPath, LLC in Denver, Colorado. APP operates the technical operation while UniPath, P.C., the affiliated 25+ pathologist medical practice, stays independent and continues to be owned and managed by the pathologists.

On March 12, 2009, the firm completed the acquisition of Eastern Carolina Pathology, Inc. in Wilson, North Carolina. APP operates the technical operation while Eastern Carolina Pathology, P.A., the affiliated four-pathologist medical practice, stays independent and continues to be owned and managed by the pathologists.

On January 17, 2011, the firm completed the acquisition of the technical operation of Palm Beach Pathology, P.A. in West Palm Beach, Florida. APP operates the technical operation while Palm Beach Pathology, P.A., the affiliated six-pathologist medical practice, stays independent and continues to be owned and managed by the pathologists.

In 2020, the company was listed in Global Clinical Reference Laboratory Services report as a Top Player on the market.
