= Paul B. Dunbar =

Commissioner of Food and Drugs

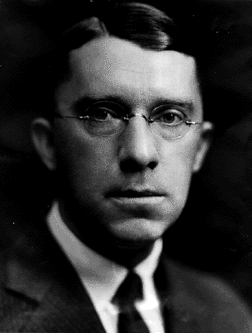

5th Commissioner of Food and Drugs
- In office May 6, 1944 – May 31, 1951
- President: Franklin D. Roosevelt; Harry S. Truman
- Preceded by: Walter G. Campbell
- Succeeded by: Charles W. Crawford

Personal details
- Born: May 29, 1882; Lebanon, Pennsylvania
- Died: August 22, 1968 (aged 86); Rockledge, Florida
- Political party: Democratic

Paul B. Dunbar (May 29, 1882 – August 22, 1968) was an American chemist who served as Commissioner of Food and Drugs from 1944 to 1951.
