= Margaret Hamburg =

American public health administrator (born 1955)

Peggy Hamburg
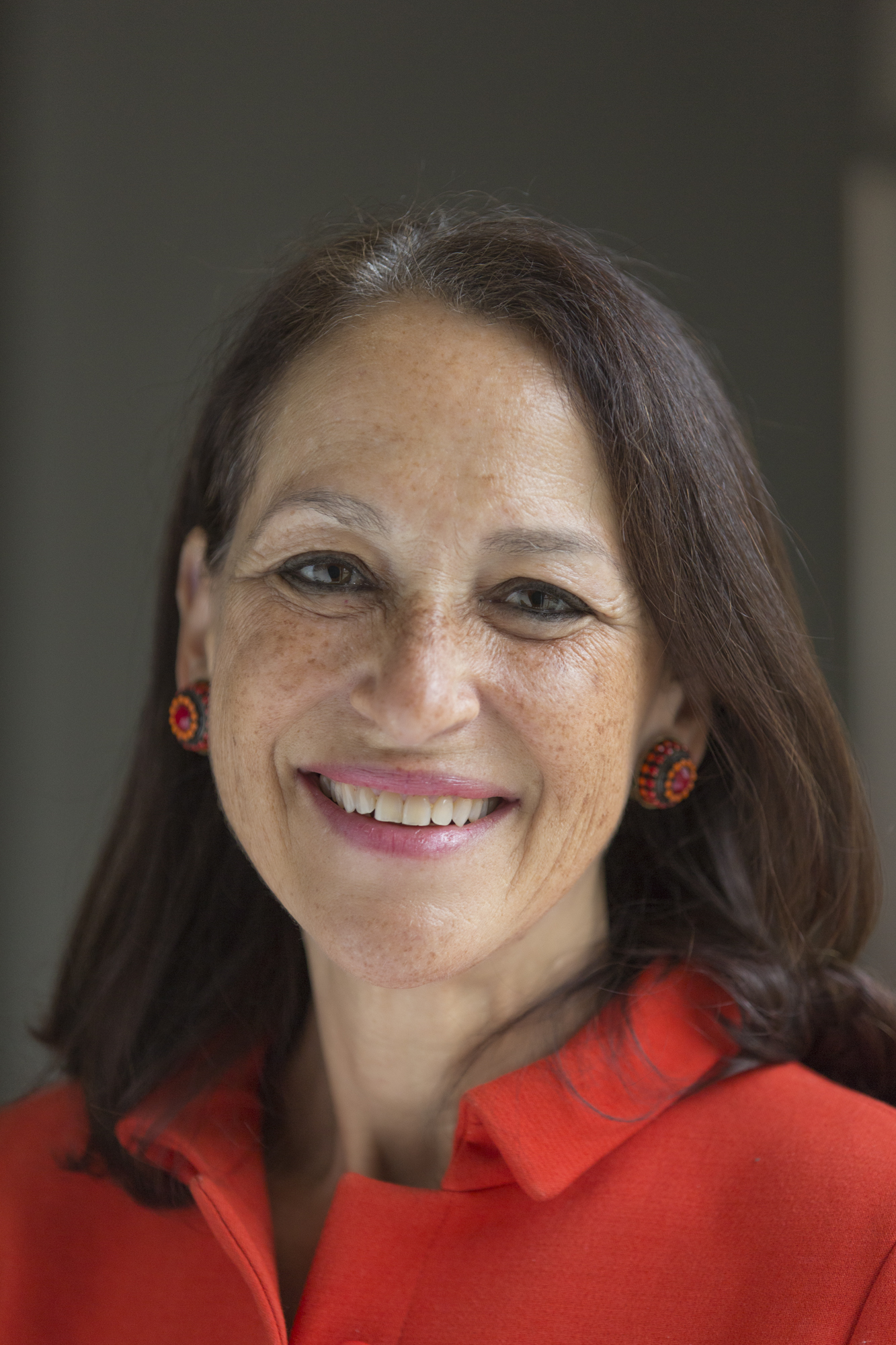
- Hamburg in 2015

21st Commissioner of Food and Drugs
- In office May 22, 2009 – April 1, 2015
- President: Barack Obama
- Preceded by: Andrew von Eschenbach
- Succeeded by: Robert Califf

Assistant Secretary of Health and Human Services for Planning and Evaluation
- In office 1997–2001
- President: Bill Clinton
- Preceded by: Peter Edelman
- Succeeded by: Bobby Jindal

Health Commissioner of New York City
- In office December 24, 1991 – April 15, 1997; Acting: June 11, 1991 – December 24, 1991
- Mayor: David Dinkins; Rudy Giuliani
- Preceded by: Woody Myers
- Succeeded by: Benjamin Mojica

Personal details
- Born: July 12, 1955 (age 71) Chicago, Illinois, U.S.
- Party: Democratic
- Spouse: Peter Brown (m. 1992)
- Relatives: Beatrix Hamburg (Mother); David A. Hamburg (Father)
- Education: Harvard University (BA, MD)

Margaret Ann "Peggy" Hamburg (born July 12, 1955, Chicago, Illinois) is an American physician and public health administrator, who is serving as the chair of the board of the American Association for the Advancement of Science (AAAS) and co-chair of the InterAcademy Partnership (IAP). She served as the 21st Commissioner of the U.S. Food and Drug Administration from May 2009 to April 2015.

== Early life and education ==
Hamburg is the daughter of Beatrix Hamburg and David A. Hamburg, both physicians. Her mother was the first self-identified African-American woman to be accepted at Vassar College and to earn a degree from the Yale University School of Medicine. Her father is President Emeritus of the Carnegie Corporation of New York and also served as the president of the AAAS in 1984.

Hamburg graduated from Harvard College in 1977 and earned her M.D. from Harvard Medical School in 1983. She completed her medical residency training at the New York Hospital-Cornell Medical Center and is Board Certified in Internal Medicine.

Hamburg is married to Peter Fitzhugh Brown, a computer scientist and artificial intelligence expert. The couple were married on May 23, 1992. Brown is the chief executive officer of Renaissance Technologies. The couple has two children together.

== Career ==
Following her medical training, Hamburg moved to Washington, D.C., to begin her career in public service. She served in several roles, beginning with a position in the Office of Disease Prevention and Health Promotion at the US Department of Health and Human Services. She also worked as a clinical instructor for Georgetown University School of Medicine from 1986 to 1990.

From May 1989 to May 1990, she worked as assistant director of the National Institute of Allergy and Infectious Diseases, National Institutes of Health under Anthony Fauci. In this position, she participated in HIV/AIDS policy development and research.

In 1991, Hamburg was appointed Commissioner of the New York City Department of Health and Mental Hygiene, where she served for six years, working first for Mayor David Dinkins and then-Mayor Rudy Giuliani. During her tenure, she worked on improved services for women and children, a needle-exchange program to reduce HIV transmission, a program to curtail the resurgence and spread of tuberculosis, and the nation's first public health bioterrorism preparedness program.

In 1997, President Bill Clinton appointed Hamburg as Assistant Secretary for Planning and Evaluation at the U.S. Department of Health and Human Services. She served in this policy role until 2001 when she became the founding Vice President for Biological Programs and later the Senior Scientist for the Nuclear Threat Initiative, a foundation created by Ted Turner dedicated to reducing the threat to public safety from nuclear, chemical, and biological weapons. In that role, Hamburg spearheaded efforts to prevent, detect, and respond to both naturally occurring and deliberately caused biological threats. She worked on reforms to reduce the dangers associated with modern bioterrorism and infectious diseases such as pandemic influenza.

In June 2001, Hamburg participated in the Operation Dark Winter exercise at Andrews Air Force Base simulating a bioterrorism event involving weaponized smallpox.

Hamburg is a member of the Medical Advisory Team for the Sidwell Friends School, where she also served on the board of trustees from 2004 to 2009. On July 13, 2005, she was announced as an advisor to the Project on Emerging Nanotechnologies by the Pew Charitable Trusts and Woodrow Wilson International Center for Scholars.

=== U.S. Food and Drug Administration ===
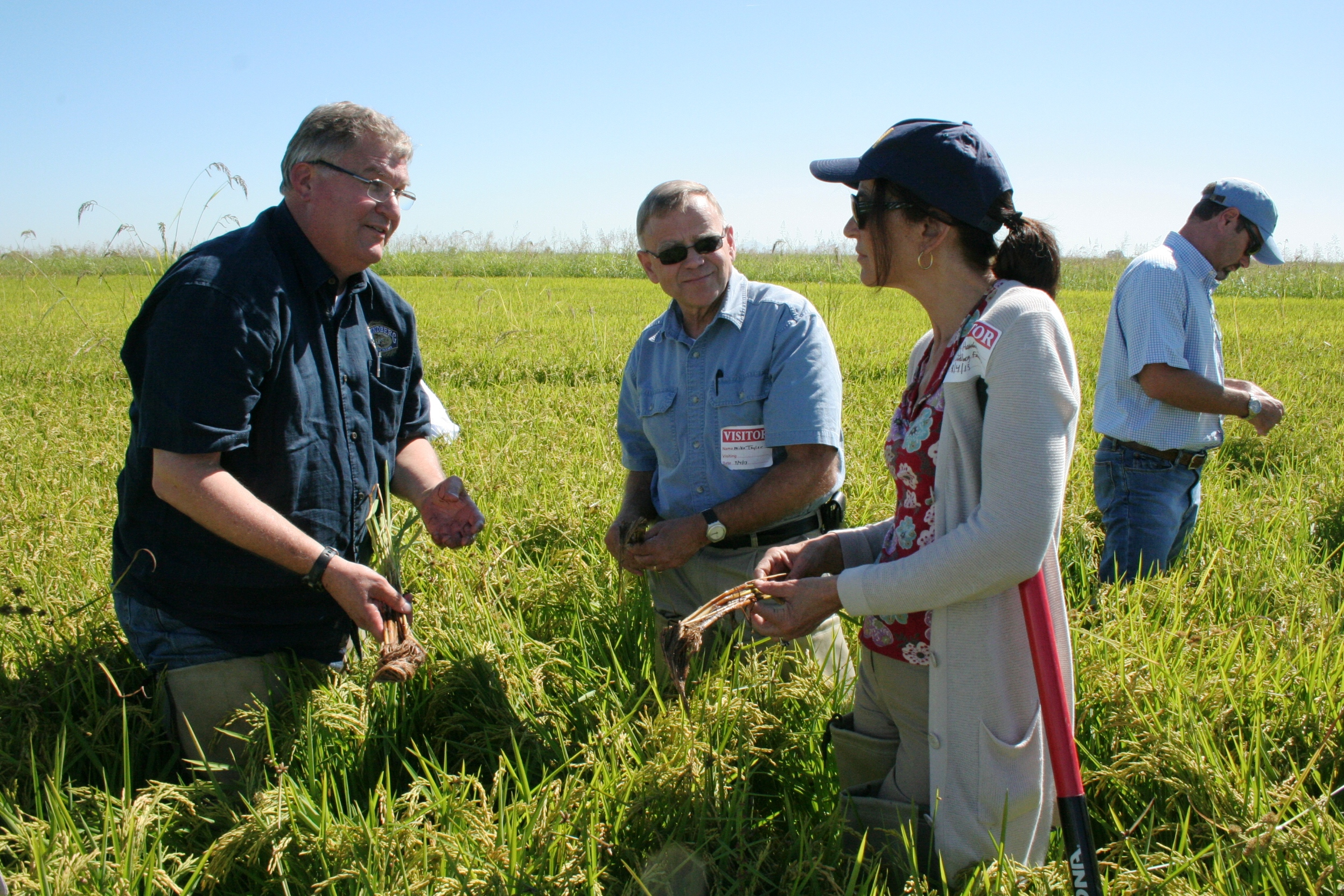
Hamburg (center right) visits a California rice farm in 2013 while Commissioner of the FDA

Hamburg was nominated by President Barack Obama in March 2009 to become Commissioner of the Food and Drug Administration, and was unanimously confirmed in May 2009. As FDA Commissioner she was known for advancing regulatory science, streamlining and modernizing FDA's regulatory pathways, and globalization of the agency, as well as the implementation of the Family Smoking Prevention and Tobacco Control Act (2009), the Food Safety Modernization Act (2011), and a review of the system for the evaluation and approval of medical devices.

Hamburg was the longest-serving FDA commissioner since David A. Kessler, as well as the second woman to hold the position. She served at the FDA until her resignation on March 28, 2015.

During Hamburg's tenure at the FDA, the agency was criticized for speeding approvals at the expense of safety, while some industry voices indicated the pace was "justified". The FDA, under Hamburg's leadership approved 51 drugs in 2014 alone, which was noted as being "most in more than 20 years" to which Hamburg attributes to "innovative approaches".

=== National Academy of Medicine ===
In April 2015 Hamburg was appointed Foreign Secretary of the National Academy of Medicine. In December 2016, Hamburg was named president-elect for the American Association for the Advancement of Science. She served a three-year term as an officer and member of the executive committee of the AAAS Board of Directors beginning in February 2017.

In 2018, she participated in the Clade X pandemic exercise that modelled a fictional parainfluenza bioterrorism attack designed to reduce the global population. She played the role of Secretary of Health and Human Services. The event was held by the Johns Hopkins Center for Health Security. Hamburg joined the board of directors for Alnylam Pharmaceuticals in 2018.

In 2020, Hamburg participated in the strategic framework development for the Grand Challenge on Climate Change, Human Health, & Equity. Other notable participants included Peter Daszak of EcoHealth Alliance, Jeremy Farrar of Wellcome Trust, and representatives from the National Institutes of Health, Rockefeller Foundation, London School of Hygiene & Tropical Medicine, ExxonMobil, University of Hong Kong, Burroughs Wellcome Fund, World Health Organization, African Development Bank, Robert Wood Johnson Foundation, National Oceanic and Atmospheric Administration, and numerous universities.

Additionally, Hamburg was appointed by the Council on Foreign Relations to serve on its Independent Task Force on Improving Pandemic Preparedness, co-chaired by Sylvia Mathews Burwell and Frances Fragos Townsend. That year, she also served on the CSIS-LSHTM High-Level Panel on Vaccine Confidence and Misinformation amid the COVID-19 pandemic, co-chaired by Heidi Larson and J. Stephen Morrison.

Hamburg participated in a tabletop exercise at the March 2021 Munich Security Conference modelling a fictional international outbreak of monkeypox. The exercise was led by the Nuclear Threat Initiative and funded by Open Philanthropy. In the exercise scenario, the hypothetical outbreak was set to begin on May 15, 2022. On May 18, 2022, a real confirmed case of monkeypox was reported in an American traveller who had recently travelled to Canada.

== Awards and recognition ==
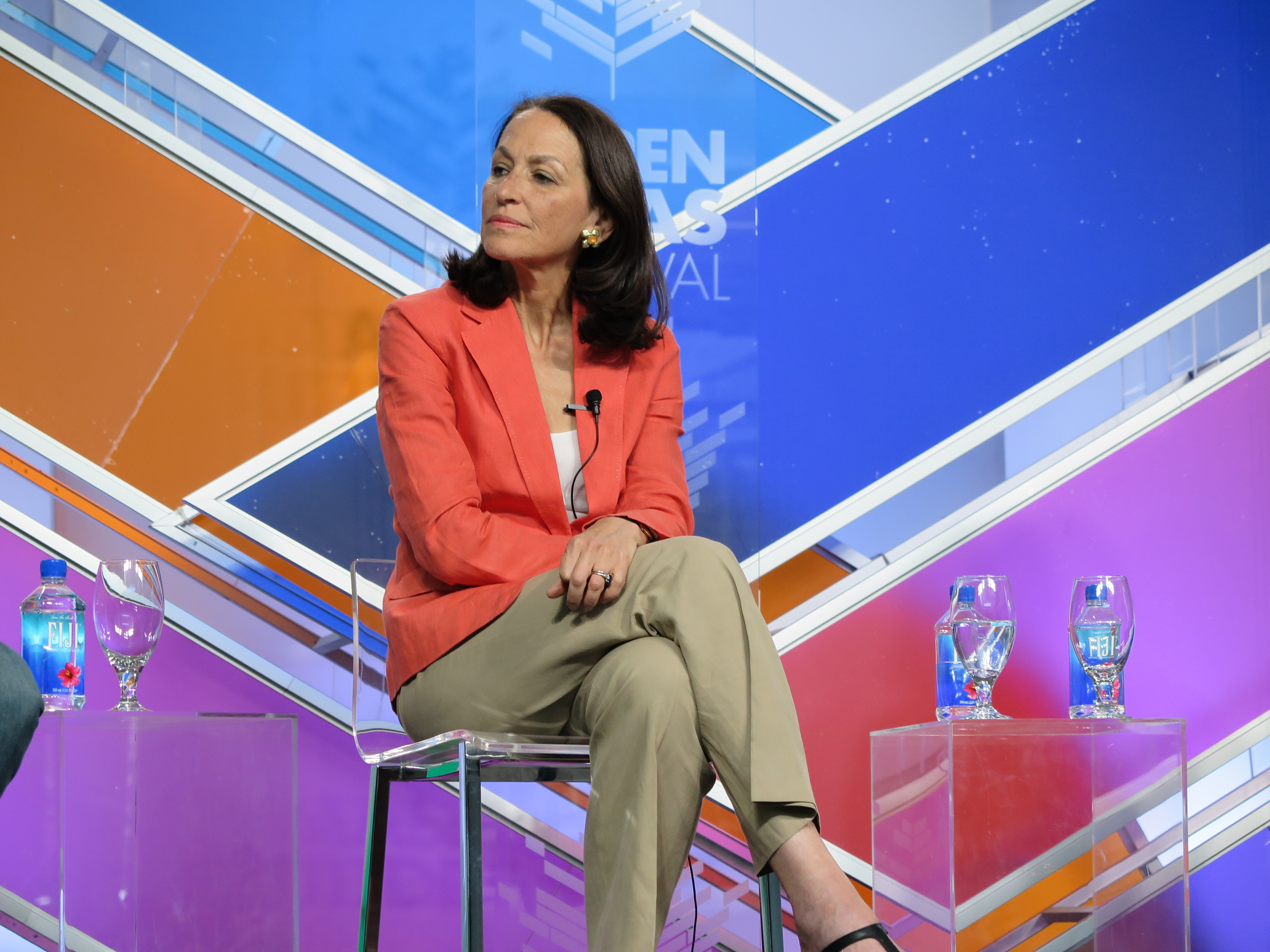
Margaret A. Hamburg at Spotlight Health, Aspen Ideas Festival, in 2015.

Hamburg is a Fellow of the American Association for the Advancement of Science and the American College of Physicians, as well as a member of the Council on Foreign Relations and the National Academy of Medicine, where she now serves as Foreign Secretary.

Hamburg has received numerous awards, among them the National Consumers League's Trumpeter Award in 2011 and the National Center for Health Research's 2011 Health Research Policy Hero Award. She has also received the American College of Clinical Pharmacology's (ACCP) Nathaniel T. Kwit Memorial Distinguished Service Award, the New York Academy of Medicine Medal for Distinguished Contributions in Health Policy, the Radcliffe Alumnae Award and the American Lung Association's Breath of Life Award. Hamburg was the 2017 recipient of the FDAAA's Harvey W. Wiley Lecture Award for Outstanding Leadership in Advancing Public Health.

She is a distinguished senior fellow with the Center for Strategic and International Studies and holds several Honorary Degrees.

Forbes named her as one of the world's 100 most powerful women multiple times, ranking 21st in 2011, 61st in 2012, 59th in 2013, and most recently 51st in 2014.

In 2022, Hamburg was awarded the AAAS Philip Hauge Abelson Prize which honors individuals' groundbreaking work in the areas of public service, scientific achievement or notable services to community.

== Other activities ==
=== Corporate boards ===
- Alnylam Pharmaceuticals, member of the board of directors (since 2018)

=== Non-profit organizations ===
- American Museum of Natural History, member of the board of trustees
- AmfAR, The Foundation for AIDS Research, member of the board of directors (former)
- Bill and Melinda Gates Foundation, member of the Global Health Scientific Advisory Committee
- Bipartisan Commission on Biodefense, commissioner
- Broad Institute, member of the board of directors
- Center for Strategic and International Studies (CSIS), Member of the Commission on Strengthening America's Health Security (since 2017)
- Coalition for Epidemic Preparedness Innovations (CEPI), chair of the Joint Coordinating Group (–2023)
- Commonwealth Fund, member of the board of directors
- Centre of Regulatory Excellence (CoRE), Duke–NUS Medical School, member of the advisory board
- Department of Global Health, University of Washington, member of the external advisory board
- GAVI Alliance, member of the board
- Harvard Medical School, member of the board of fellows
- Harvard University, member of the global advisory council
- Nuclear Threat Initiative (NTI), member of the board of directors
- Simons Foundation, member of the scientific advisory board for the Autism Research Initiative
- Urban Institute, member of the board of trustees
- Wellcome Trust, member of the Strategic Advisory Board on Vaccines and Drug-resistant Infections
- World Dementia Council, member of the board

Hamburg formerly served on the boards of the Rockefeller Foundation, the Rockefeller University, the Nathan Cummings Foundation, Conservation International and Henry Schein Inc. She has participated as a member of the Central Intelligence Agency's Intelligence Science Board.

She is also a member of the National Advisory Council for the COVID Collaborative.

Hamburg is affiliated with the World Economic Forum. On April 6, 2021, she participated as a speaker at a WEF event titled "The Next Frontier: Synthetic Biology".

== Legal issues ==
In 2016, Hamburg, her husband, Johnson & Johnson, and others were named in a lawsuit by Larry Klayman, who has since been suspended from practicing law in DC. The suit was dismissed with prejudice in 2017 by a District of Columbia federal judge.

== In popular culture ==
Hamburg is the subject of an R. Crumb comic strip entitled "Deep State Woman" that appears in his 2025 book Tales of Paranoia

== Selected publications ==
- Hamburg MA. (2012). Science and regulation: FDA's approach to regulation of products of nanotechnology. Science. Vol. 336(6079):299-300
- Hamburg MA. (2010). Shattuck lecture: Innovation, regulation, and the FDA. New England Journal of Medicine. Vol. 363(23):2228-32
- Hamburg MA, Collins FS. (2010). The path to personalized medicine. New England Journal of Medicine. Vol. 363(4):301-4
- Hamburg MA, Sharfstein JM. (2009). The FDA as a public health agency. New England Journal of Medicine. Vol. 360(24):2493-5
- Hamburg, M.A., Levi, J., Elliott, K. and Williams, L. (2008). Germs go global: why emerging infectious diseases are a threat to America. Trust for America's Health
- Hamburg, M.A. (2007). Public health and China: emerging disease and challenges to health. In: K.M. Campbell and W. Darsie (eds.). China's March on the 21st century: A Report of the Aspen Srategy Group. Washington DC: The Aspen Institute, pp 61–76
- Hamburg, M.A. (2002). Bioterrorism: responding to an emerging threat. Trends in Biotechnology. Vol. 20(7): 296–298
- Hamburg, M.A. (2002). Preparing for and preventing bioterrorism. Issues in Science and Technology. Vol. 18(2): 27–30
- Hamburg, M.A. (2001). Challenges facing public health agencies. Public Health Reports. Vol. 116(Supplement 2): 59–63
- Frieden, T.R., Fujiwara, P.I., Washko, R.M. and Hamburg, M.A. (1995) Turning the tide on tuberculosis: the New York City experience. New England Journal of Medicine, Vol. 333: 229–233
- Hamburg, M.A. and Frieden, T.R. (1994). Tuberculosis transmission in the 1990s (editorial). The New England Journal of Medicine, Vol. 330, No. 24: 1750–1751
- Hamburg, M.A. and Fauci, A.S. (Spring 1989). AIDS: the challenge to biomedical research. Deadalus, Vol. 118, No. 2: 19–39
- Hamburg, M. and Tallman, J.F. (1981). Chronic morphine administration increases the apparent number of alpha-2 adrenergic receptors in rat brain. Nature 291: 493–495
- Smolinski, M.S., Hamburg, M.A., and Lederberg, J., Editors (2003) Microbial Threats to Health: Emergence, Detection, and Response. Washington D.C.: The National Academies Press
- "Zerhouni E and Hamburg M. (2016). The need for global regulatory harmonization: A public health imperative. Science Translational Medicine. Vol 8(338)"

Government offices
| Preceded by Woody Myers | Health Commissioner of New York City; 1991–1997 | Succeeded by Benjamin Mojica |
| Preceded by Peter Edelman | Assistant Secretary of Health and Human Services for Planning and Evaluation; 1997–2001 | Succeeded by Bobby Jindal |
| Preceded by Andrew von Eschenbach | Commissioner of Food and Drugs; 2009–2015 | Succeeded by Robert Califf |
