= Kyle Diamantas =

American attorney (born 1987)

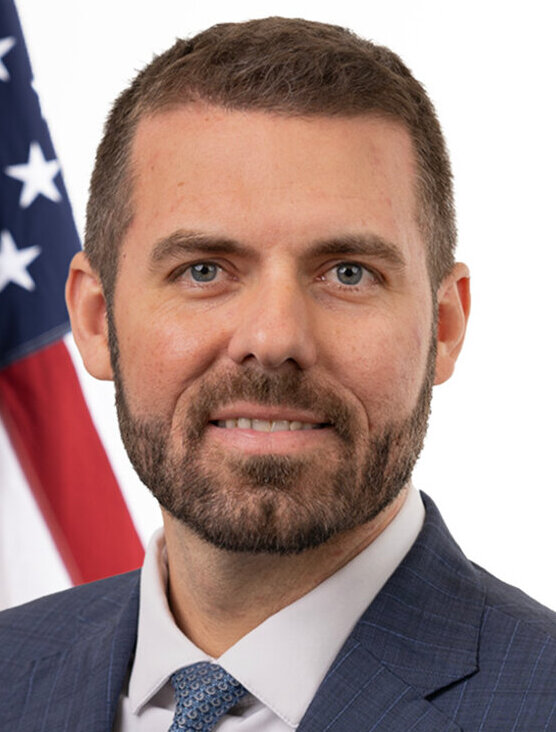
- Official portrait, 2025

Acting Commissioner of Food and Drugs
- Incumbent
- Assumed office May 15, 2026
- President: Donald Trump
- Preceded by: Marty Makary

Deputy Commissioner for Food
- In office February 24, 2025 – May 12, 2026
- President: Donald Trump
- Commissioner: Marty Makary
- Preceded by: Jim Jones
- Succeeded by: Donald Prater (acting)

Personal details
- Born: Kyle Allen Diamantas; November 25, 1987 (age 38) Rockledge, Florida, U.S.
- Education: University of Central Florida (BA); University of Florida (JD)

Kyle Allen Diamantas (born November 25, 1987) is an American attorney who has served as the acting commissioner of food and drugs since 2026. He served as the deputy commissioner for food from 2025 to 2026 and concurrently served as the Senior Counselor to the Secretary within the United States Department of Health and Human Services.

Diamantas graduated from the University of Central Florida with a degree in political science in 2010 and from the University of Florida with a Juris Doctor in 2013. In 2024, he became a partner at Jones Day.

In February 2025, Diamantas was appointed as the deputy commissioner for food. He became the acting commissioner of food and drugs after Marty Makary's resignation in May 2026.

== Early life and education (1987–2013) ==
Kyle Allen Diamantas was born on November 25, 1987, in Rockledge, Florida. Diamantas attended Merritt Island High School, where he played baseball. He graduated from the University of Central Florida with a degree in pre-law political science in 2010 and from the University of Florida with a Juris Doctor in 2013.

== Career ==
=== Legal work (2014–2024) ===
As early as 2014, Diamantas worked at Baker Donelson. He represented Hemp Bombs in a lawsuit against its cannabidiol products and defended Whole Foods Market in a claim that it sold a cannabidiol product under false pretenses. According to Politico, Diamantas represented Planned Parenthood, though he had moral objections and later requested he be removed from cases involving the organization. In July 2021, he was named as a counsel for Jones Day; in 2024, he became a partner at the firm. In March 2024, Diamantas began representing Abbott Laboratories in a lawsuit that claimed the company did not warn customers of risks relating to its infant formula. Abbott later lost the lawsuit.

=== Deputy commissioner of food (2025–2026) ===
In November 2024, Diamantas was a member of a post-market safety assessment group established by the Food and Drug Administration to review chemicals in food. By February 2025, he had become a special assistant in the office of the commissioner of food and drugs. That month, Bloomberg News reported that Diamantas had been appointed to succeed Jim Jones as the acting deputy commissioner for human foods. He was publicly listed on the Food and Drug Administration's website on February 24.

As the deputy commissioner for human foods, Diamantas oversaw the agency's process for creating the definition of ultra-processed food. He told The New York Times that the Food and Drug Administration would consider the use of synthetic dyes, emulsifiers, and preservatives in creating that definition. Diamantas was additionally responsible for reviewing infant formula, an authority that caused a possible conflict of interest; the agency told the Times that he had agreed to recuse himself from matters involving Abbott Laboratories and British American Tobacco. Diamantas sought to fulfill the priorities of Secretary of Health and Human Services Robert F. Kennedy Jr. and the Make America Healthy Again movement.

In February 2026, The Wall Street Journal reported that Diamantas had been appointed to assist Chris Klomp in managing the Food and Drug Administration at the Department of Health and Human Services. After he was appointed as the acting commissioner of food and drugs in May, Diamantas was succeeded by Donald Prater.

== Acting Commissioner of Food and Drugs (2026–present) ==
On May 12, 2026, Marty Makary, the commissioner of food and drugs, resigned from his position amid pressure to authorize the sale of flavored vapes. Diamantas was named as the acting commissioner. He is the first lawyer to serve as the commissioner of food and drugs and the second officeholder to have previously led the Foods Program.
