= Marty Makary =

British-American surgeon and author

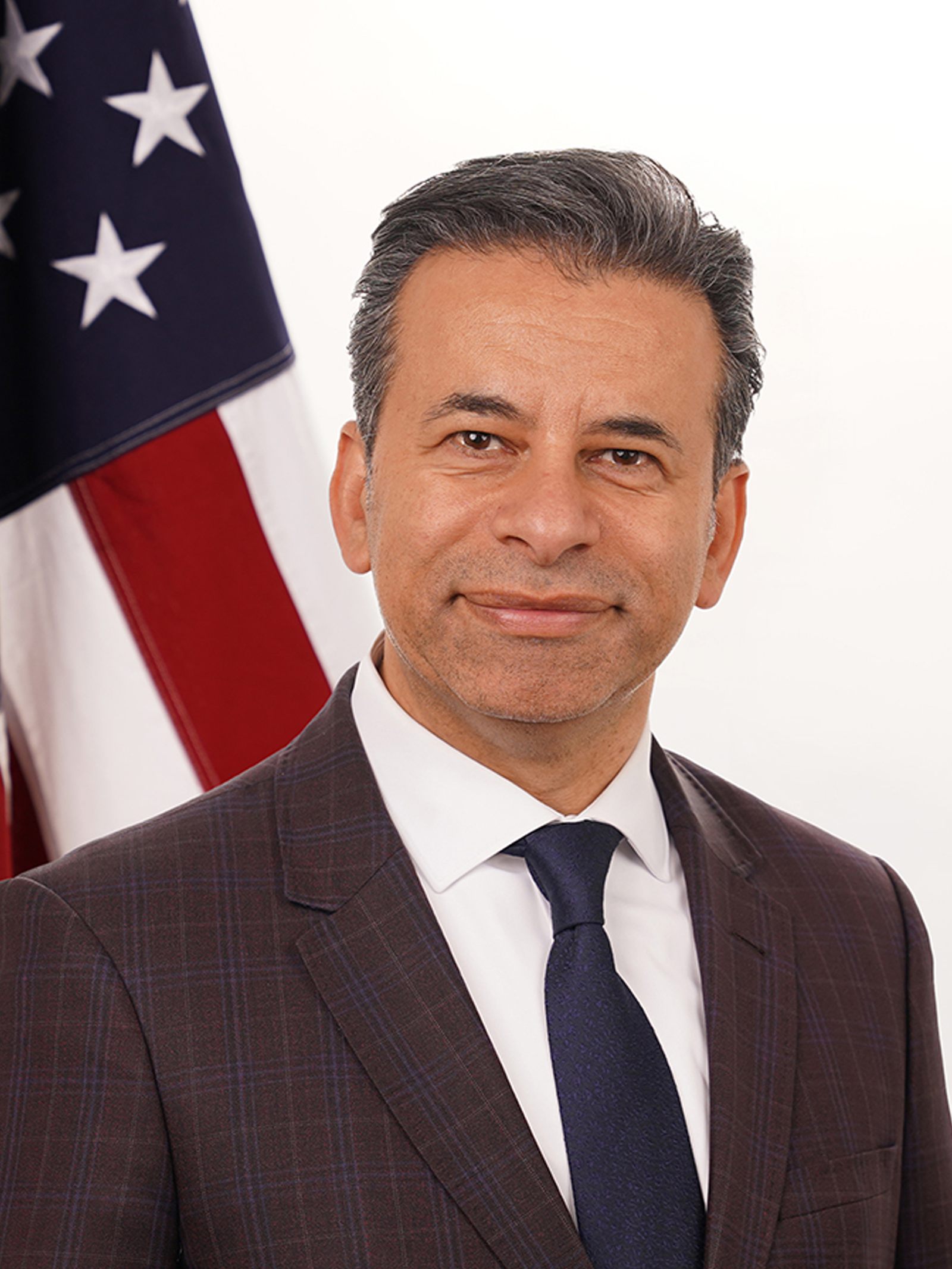
- Official portrait, 2025

27th Commissioner of Food and Drugs
- In office April 1, 2025 – May 13, 2026
- President: Donald Trump
- Deputy: Sara Brenner
- Preceded by: Robert Califf
- Succeeded by: Kyle Diamantas (acting)

Personal details
- Born: Martin Adel Makary Liverpool, England
- Party: Republican
- Education: Bucknell University (BS); Thomas Jefferson University (MD); Harvard University (MPH)
- Medical career
- Profession: Surgeon
- Field: Abdominal surgery
- Institutions: Georgetown University; Johns Hopkins University
- Sub-specialties: Islet transplant surgery
- Website: University website

Martin Adel Makary (/məˈkæri/) is an Egyptian-American-British surgeon, professor, author, and medical commentator, who served as the 27th FDA commissioner from 2025 to 2026. He has practiced surgical oncology and gastrointestinal laparoscopic surgery at Johns Hopkins Hospital, was the Mark Ravitch Chair in Gastrointestinal Surgery at Johns Hopkins School of Medicine, and was the chief of Islet Transplant Surgery at Johns Hopkins. Makary completed his surgical residency at Georgetown University and sub-specialty training in surgical oncology and gastrointestinal surgery at Johns Hopkins under John Cameron, later joining Cameron's faculty practice. He is now Professor Emeritus at Johns Hopkins.

Makary has pioneered advanced laparoscopic procedures, including the first laparoscopic Whipple and Frey’s procedures at Johns Hopkins, and led the development of "the Surgery Checklist" in collaboration with the World Health Organization. Makary has held several leadership roles at Johns Hopkins, including Credentials Chair, Director of Quality and Safety for Surgery, clinical lead for the Sibley Innovation Hub, and Executive Director of Improving Wisely. He has published on surgical safety, frailty, teamwork, and hospital quality, and has advocated for public reporting of physician-endorsed quality measures, price transparency, and reform in drug pricing.

Makary's books include Unaccountable, The Price We Pay, Mama Maggie, and Blind Spots, focusing on improving healthcare systems, critical evaluation of medical practices, and personal narratives of humanitarian work. In 2018, he was elected to the National Academy of Medicine. Some of his research and commentary has been controversial, including a paper claiming medical error is the third leading cause of death in the United States. During the COVID-19 pandemic, Makary supported universal masking early on and vaccines for adults, but opposed broad vaccine mandates, certain school and university restrictions, and boosters for younger populations.

In November 2024, President-elect Donald Trump announced Makary would be his nominee to head the Food and Drug Administration (FDA) as its commissioner. He was confirmed by the United States Senate in March 2025. As FDA commissioner, Makary prioritized modernizing regulatory processes and launching AI-assisted review tools. In May 2026, Makary resigned as FDA commissioner after Trump decided to lift the agency's ban on the sale of fruit-flavored e-cigarettes (vapes) in the U.S.

== Early life and education ==
Makary was born in Liverpool, England. His Egyptian family moved to Baltimore when Marty was a young child. They later moved to Danville, Pennsylvania, when his father took a job as a hematologist at the Geisinger Medical Center.

Makary holds undergraduate and medical degrees from Bucknell University, and Thomas Jefferson University. He also completed a Masters of Public Health (M.P.H.) degree, with a concentration in health policy, at Harvard University.

== Professional career ==
Makary completed a surgical residency at Georgetown University in Washington, D.C., where he also worked as a writer for the Advisory Board Company. Makary completed sub-specialty surgery training at Johns Hopkins in surgical oncology and gastrointestinal surgery under surgeon John Cameron, before joining Cameron's faculty practice as a partner. In his first few years on the faculty at Johns Hopkins, Makary researched and wrote articles on the prevention of surgical complications. He published on frailty as a medical condition, and on safety and teamwork culture in medicine. Makary is the first author of the original scientific publications describing "The Surgery Checklist". Makary worked with the World Health Organization to develop the official World Health Organization Surgical Checklist.

Makary was named Mark Ravitch Chair in Gastrointestinal Surgery, an endowed chair at the Johns Hopkins University School of Medicine. Three years later, he was named the credentials chair and director of quality and safety for surgery at Johns Hopkins. In 2020, Makary was named Editor-in-Chief of MedPage Today. He was also appointed chief of the Johns Hopkins Islet Transplant Center, clinical lead for the Johns Hopkins Sibley Innovation Hub, executive director of Improving Wisely, a Robert Wood Johnson Foundation project to lower health care costs, and is founder of the Johns Hopkins Center For Surgical Outcomes Research and Clinical Trials.

Makary is a pancreatic surgeon and has pioneered surgical procedures. He was awarded the Nobility in Science Award by the National Pancreas Foundation for performing the world's first series of laparoscopic pancreas islet transplant operations. He has traveled with his international team overseas. Makary specializes in advanced laparoscopic surgery and performed the first laparoscopic Whipple surgery at Johns Hopkins and the first laparoscopic Frey's procedure for pancreatitis.

Makary's research led to several partnerships, including a grant from the U.S. Department of Health and Human Services Agency for Healthcare Quality and Research, to study obesity treatment, and a grant from the same agency to implement safety programs at 100 U.S. hospitals, a project he collaborated on with Peter Pronovost and the American College of Surgeons. Makary was also the lead author in the original paper introducing a Hospital Survey of Patient Safety Culture.

Makary has called for the public reporting of physician-endorsed quality measures by hospitals. Makary also advocates for price transparency and has led efforts to ask hospitals to stop suing their low-income patients.

In 2016, Makary and his colleagues exposed loopholes in the Orphan Drug Act of 1983 that, they said, accounted for higher drug pricing. His article "The Orphan Drug Act: Restoring the Mission to Rare Diseases", covered by Kaiser Health News, led Senator Chuck Grassley's office to announce an investigation.

Makary, along with Michael Daniel, authored a piece in the British Medical Journal claiming that medical error is the third-leading cause of death in the United States. Several critics pointed out the article's poor methodology in terms of how said number is calculated, suggesting the number they presented—just under half a million deaths per year—is likely an overestimate. Critics have claimed that such numbers give the public the wrong impression regarding the safety and quality of medical care, allowing groups like alternative medicine to discourage people from seeking appropriate care.

=== COVID-19 pandemic ===
During the COVID-19 pandemic, Makary has been a proponent of treating the pandemic as a public health threat, masking, vaccines and early vaccination strategies that prioritized maximum coverage against severe disease similar to the UK vaccination strategy, and protection provided by natural immunity. Makary has also been an outspoken opponent of vaccine mandates, various FDA and CDC policies, and restrictions at colleges and universities.

In February 2020, Makary said on television that the United States needed to take the threat of COVID-19 seriously and that people should stop all non-essential travel. Makary called for a national lockdown to help slow the spread of the virus and enable the healthcare system to respond and reduce morbidity and mortality. In May 2020, Makary advocated for universal masking in an effort to enable businesses and schools to re-open to minimize economic and educational damage across the United States.

In November 2020, Makary was critical of the pace at which the FDA was approving the mRNA vaccines from Pfizer. Makary had taken issue with the speed at which various US government health organizations had taken to evaluate medications or perform COVID-19-based research. In early February 2021, Makary advocated for prioritizing getting as many vaccinated with single doses versus holding vaccines back for second doses.

In a February 2021 op-ed in The Wall Street Journal, Makary predicted that "at the current trajectory", COVID-19 in the United States would "be mostly gone by April" 2021, primarily as a result of naturally acquired immunity, which would result in herd immunity. The article's estimates of herd immunity were criticized for being higher than the best available data supported. Later that year, the Delta and Omicron variants of COVID-19 caused hundreds of thousands of additional deaths in the United States.

Makary considers himself pro-vaccine but has also criticized vaccination mandates for populations other than healthcare workers. Makary recommended a single-dose mRNA vaccine regimen for children 12-17 to minimize the occurrence of myocarditis as a reaction, contrary to the CDC's finding that the risks of infection "far outweigh" those of the two-dose vaccine schedule. In December 2021, he appeared on a podcast to argue against vaccine boosters, referring to himself as an "unboosted male" and saying that the SARS-CoV-2 Omicron variant was "nature's vaccine".

On May 20, 2025, FDA commissioner Makary and CBER director Vinay Prasad published an article in The New England Journal of Medicine announcing that the FDA would limit COVID-19 vaccines to people over 65 or at high risk of serious illness and would require manufacturers to conduct additional large studies to evaluate their benefits for children and healthy younger adults.

== 27th Commissioner of Food and Drugs (2025–2026) ==
Makary testifying at his confirmation hearing before the U.S. Senate Committee on Health, Education, Labor, and Pensions (HELP) committee on March 6, 2025

On March 6, 2025, Makary appeared before the U.S. Senate Committee on Health, Education, Labor, and Pensions (HELP). His nomination was advanced by the committee to the full United States Senate by a vote of 14–9, and he was confirmed as commissioner of the Food and Drug Administration on March 25, 2025, by a vote of 56–44.

During Makary's tenure, the FDA pursued reforms involving food regulation, drug and medical-device development, artificial intelligence, manufacturing oversight, medication labeling, affordability, and agency operations. In food policy, the FDA and the Department of Health and Human Services announced an initiative to phase out petroleum-based synthetic food dyes, accelerate the approval of naturally derived color additives, and reassess selected food chemicals. The agency also participated in revised dietary guidance emphasizing minimally processed foods and protein, initiated a school-meal pilot focused on reducing pesticide and heavy-metal exposure, worked toward a federal definition of ultra-processed food, and included reform of the Generally Recognized as Safe process among its priorities. Makary also convened an expert panel to review infant-formula standards and the FDA proposed lowering the minimum soluble-solids requirement for pasteurized orange juice.

In medication policy, the FDA reconsidered boxed warnings for menopausal hormone replacement therapy and requested removal of selected references to cardiovascular disease, breast cancer, and probable dementia while retaining or revising other risk information. The agency also explored whether vaginal estrogen and other medications could be made available without a prescription, expanded testosterone-treatment options, revised testosterone labeling, changed opioid labeling to emphasize addiction and overdose risks, issued guidance on pregnancy-safety data, and expanded warnings concerning weight loss in young children taking certain extended-release ADHD medications.

Makary's FDA also sought to shorten drug-development and regulatory-review timelines. The agency created the Commissioner's National Priority Voucher program, under which selected drug and biologic applications addressing national priorities could receive expedited review. The program allowed the FDA to begin reviewing portions of some applications before the associated clinical trial had fully concluded. The agency also authorized expanded access to the investigational pancreatic-cancer drug daraxonrasib shortly after receiving the application and issued a roadmap to reduce reliance on some animal-testing requirements by encouraging computational modeling, organoids, organ-on-a-chip systems, and other human-relevant methods.

The FDA also launched a real-time clinical-trial initiative intended to allow agency scientists to monitor selected clinical-trial information while studies were underway. Through a regulatory dashboard, reviewers could observe emerging information such as infections, tumor responses, clinical outcomes, and safety signals as the data became available rather than waiting for conventional periodic or final submissions. The initiative was intended to reduce administrative delays and permit earlier communication between regulators and trial sponsors.

The FDA further supported greater reliance on one adequate and well-controlled pivotal trial when accompanied by sufficiently persuasive confirmatory evidence, rather than treating two pivotal trials as an automatic default. It also modernized early-stage development and Investigational New Drug procedures, expanded manufacturing flexibility for cell and gene therapies, introduced the Plausible Mechanism Pathway for ultra-rare diseases, encouraged greater use of Bayesian statistics, and eliminated certain Risk Evaluation and Mitigation Strategies requirements for autologous CAR-T therapies.

The agency increased enforcement concerning pharmaceutical advertising, expanded public release of complete response letters, and called on drug manufacturers to report previously undisclosed or overdue clinical-trial results. During Makary's tenure, the FDA also undertook a recruitment initiative involving approximately 3,000 scientists and other employees, increased compensation for some scientific personnel, and developed bonuses tied to the early completion of regulatory reviews.

Artificial intelligence and digital modernization were also central to Makary's tenure. The FDA deployed an internal generative-AI system known as Elsa and later expanded it to include agentic capabilities for multistep workflows. The agency used AI to automate portions of the filing review for new drug applications, published filing-review checklists, consolidated adverse-event, application, and drug-safety systems, launched a public adverse-event lookup tool, and began digitizing paper regulatory submissions stored in seven warehouses.

In manufacturing and affordability policy, Makary proposed user-fee incentives for drugs developed and manufactured in the United States, launched the FDA PreCheck program, expanded unannounced inspections of foreign facilities, and introduced abbreviated one-day assessments for selected lower-risk sites. The FDA also streamlined biosimilar development, promoted interchangeability between biologics and biosimilars, and included affordability among the considerations for the National Priority Voucher program.

In medical-device regulation, the FDA expanded the use of real-world evidence, clarified the regulatory treatment of general-wellness and clinical decision-support software, launched the TEMPO digital-health pilot, and partnered with the Centers for Medicare & Medicaid Services on the RAPID pathway to coordinate regulatory review and Medicare coverage for selected breakthrough devices.

The agency also increased enforcement against unauthorized electronic-cigarette products, initiated action concerning concentrated 7-hydroxymitragynine products, convened expert panels on food allergies, restricted certain unapproved fluoride products marketed for children, examined talc use in children's products, and proposed expanding the list of permitted active ingredients in over-the-counter sunscreens. In May 2026, Makary resigned as FDA commissioner after Trump decided to lift the agency's ban on the sale of fruit-flavored e-cigarettes (vapes) in the U.S.

== Writings ==
Makary is the author of the 2012 book Unaccountable: What Hospitals Won't Tell You and How Transparency Can Revolutionize Health Care, in which he proposes that "common sense", physician-led solutions can fix the "broken healthcare system"; the book largely focuses on medical error and malpractice.

Makary is also the author, with Ellen Vaughn, of Mama Maggie, a 2015 biography of Magda Gobran, a Coptic Christian woman and humanitarian working in the slums of Cairo, Egypt, to whom Makary is distanly related.

Makary's 2018 book The Price We Pay focuses on the problem of the extremely high costs of American healthcare; Makary opposes Medicare for All, instead arguing that "transparency will solve the health care cost problem by allowing the free market to work."

Makary is also the editor of the surgery textbook General Surgery Review.

In his 2024 book Blind Spots, Makary examines various cases where experts "got the science perfectly backwards", and argues that "groupthink" is prevalent among the medical establishment and often impedes scientific progress.

== Personal life ==
Makary is a Coptic Christian. He was previously married to the journalist Kirsten Powers.

== Political views ==
Makary donated to Barack Obama's presidential campaign in 2008. He also gave money to Republican House member Frank Wolf in the mid-2000s.

In 2024, he was a public adviser to Paragon Health Institute, a conservative healthcare think tank.

== Awards and recognition ==
Makary has received research and teaching awards, including the Best Teacher Award for Georgetown Medical School and research awards from the Washington Academy of Surgery and the New England Surgical Society. Makary was named one of the most influential people in healthcare by HealthLeader magazine in 2013. In 2018, he was elected to the National Academy of Medicine.
