= Commissioner of Food and Drugs =

Head of US Food and Drug Administration

United States Commissioner of Food and Drugs
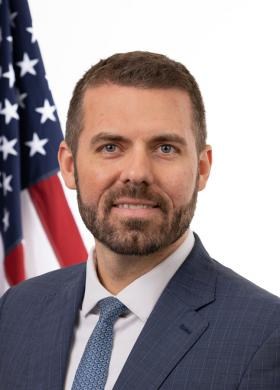
- Incumbent; Kyle Diamantas; Acting since May 15, 2026
- Department of Health and Human Services; Food and Drug Administration
- Reports to: Secretary of Health and Human Services
- Term length: No fixed term

The United States commissioner of food and drugs is the head of the Food and Drug Administration (FDA), an agency of the United States Department of Health and Human Services. The commissioner is nominated by the president of the United States and confirmed by the Senate. The commissioner reports to the secretary of health and human services.

Due to frequent controversies involving the FDA, appointments are not always prompt and the agency is often headed by an acting commissioner. For example, Andrew von Eschenbach's appointment was held up by senators who objected to the FDA's refusal to allow emergency contraception to be sold over the counter.

The commissioner has frequently been a physician, but this is not a requirement for the post. Commissioners rarely come from a food-related background.

== List of commissioners ==
The following persons served as Commissioner of Food and Drugs Administration:

Unnumbered, colored rows indicate acting commissioners.

No.	Name (birth–death)	Portrait	Term of office		Refs.	Appointed by (term)
No.	Name (birth–death)	Portrait	Start of term	End of term	Refs.	Appointed by (term)
1	Harvey Washington Wiley		January 1, 1907	March 15, 1912		Theodore Roosevelt
2	Carl L. Alsberg		December 16, 1912	July 15, 1921		William Howard Taft
3	Walter G. Campbell		July 16, 1921	June 30, 1924		Warren G. Harding
4	Charles Albert Browne Jr.		July 1, 1924	June 30, 1927		Calvin Coolidge
5 (Note: Campbell had previously served as Commissioner)	Walter G. Campbell		July 1, 1927	April 30, 1944		Calvin Coolidge
6	Paul B. Dunbar		May 6, 1944	May 31, 1951		Franklin D. Roosevelt
7	Charles W. Crawford		June 1, 1951	July 31, 1954		Harry S. Truman
8	George P. Larrick		August 12, 1954	December 27, 1965		Dwight D. Eisenhower
9	James L. Goddard		January 17, 1966	July 1, 1968		Lyndon B. Johnson
10	Herbert L. Ley Jr.		July 1, 1968	December 12, 1969		Lyndon B. Johnson
11	Charles C. Edwards		December 13, 1969	March 15, 1973		Richard Nixon
12	Alexander M. Schmidt		July 20, 1973	November 30, 1976		Richard Nixon
13	Donald Kennedy		April 4, 1977	June 30, 1979		Jimmy Carter
14	Jere E. Goyan		October 21, 1979	January 20, 1981		Jimmy Carter
15	Arthur H. Hayes Jr.		April 13, 1981	September 11, 1983		Ronald Reagan
16	Frank E. Young		July 15, 1984	December 17, 1989		Ronald Reagan
17	David A. Kessler		November 8, 1990	February 28, 1997		George H. W. Bush Bill Clinton
18	Jane E. Henney		January 17, 1999	January 19, 2001		Bill Clinton
19	Mark McClellan		November 14, 2002	March 26, 2004		George W. Bush
20	Lester Crawford		July 18, 2005	September 23, 2005		George W. Bush
21	Andrew von Eschenbach		December 13, 2006	January 20, 2009		George W. Bush
–	Frank M. Torti		January 20, 2009	March 29, 2009		
–	Joshua M. Sharfstein		March 30, 2009	May 21, 2009		
22	Margaret Hamburg		May 22, 2009	April 1, 2015		Barack Obama
–	Stephen Ostroff		April 1, 2015	February 22, 2016		Barack Obama
23	Robert Califf		February 22, 2016	January 20, 2017		Barack Obama
–	Stephen Ostroff		January 20, 2017	May 11, 2017		Donald Trump
24	Scott Gottlieb		May 11, 2017	April 5, 2019		Donald Trump
–	Norman Sharpless		April 5, 2019	November 1, 2019		Donald Trump
–	Admiral; Brett Giroir		November 6, 2019	December 17, 2019		Donald Trump
25	Stephen Hahn		December 17, 2019	January 20, 2021		Donald Trump
–	Janet Woodcock		January 20, 2021	February 17, 2022		Joe Biden
26 (Note: Califf had previously served as Commissioner)	Robert Califf		February 17, 2022	January 20, 2025		Joe Biden
–	Sara Brenner		January 24, 2025	April 1, 2025		Donald Trump
27	Marty Makary		April 1, 2025	May 13, 2026		Donald Trump
–	Kyle Diamantas		May 15, 2026	Incumbent		Donald Trump

Table notes:

== See also ==
- Regulation of therapeutic goods
