= Radium dial =

Instrument dials painted with radium-based paint

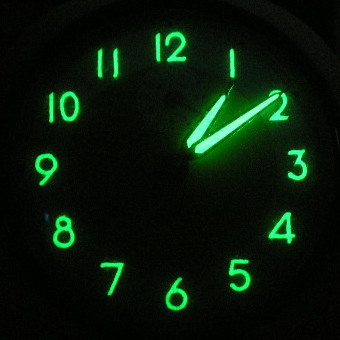
A 1950s radium clock, exposed to ultraviolet light to increase luminescence

Radium dials are watch, clock and other instrument dials painted with luminous paint containing radium-226 to produce radioluminescence. Radium dials were produced throughout most of the 20th century before being replaced by safer tritium-based luminous material in the 1970s and finally by non-toxic, non-radioactive strontium aluminate–based photoluminescent material from the middle 1990s. The gruesome and often fatal radium jaw injuries suffered by early dial painters in the United States became a cause célèbre for occupational safety and labor law in the opening decades of the 20th century.

== History ==
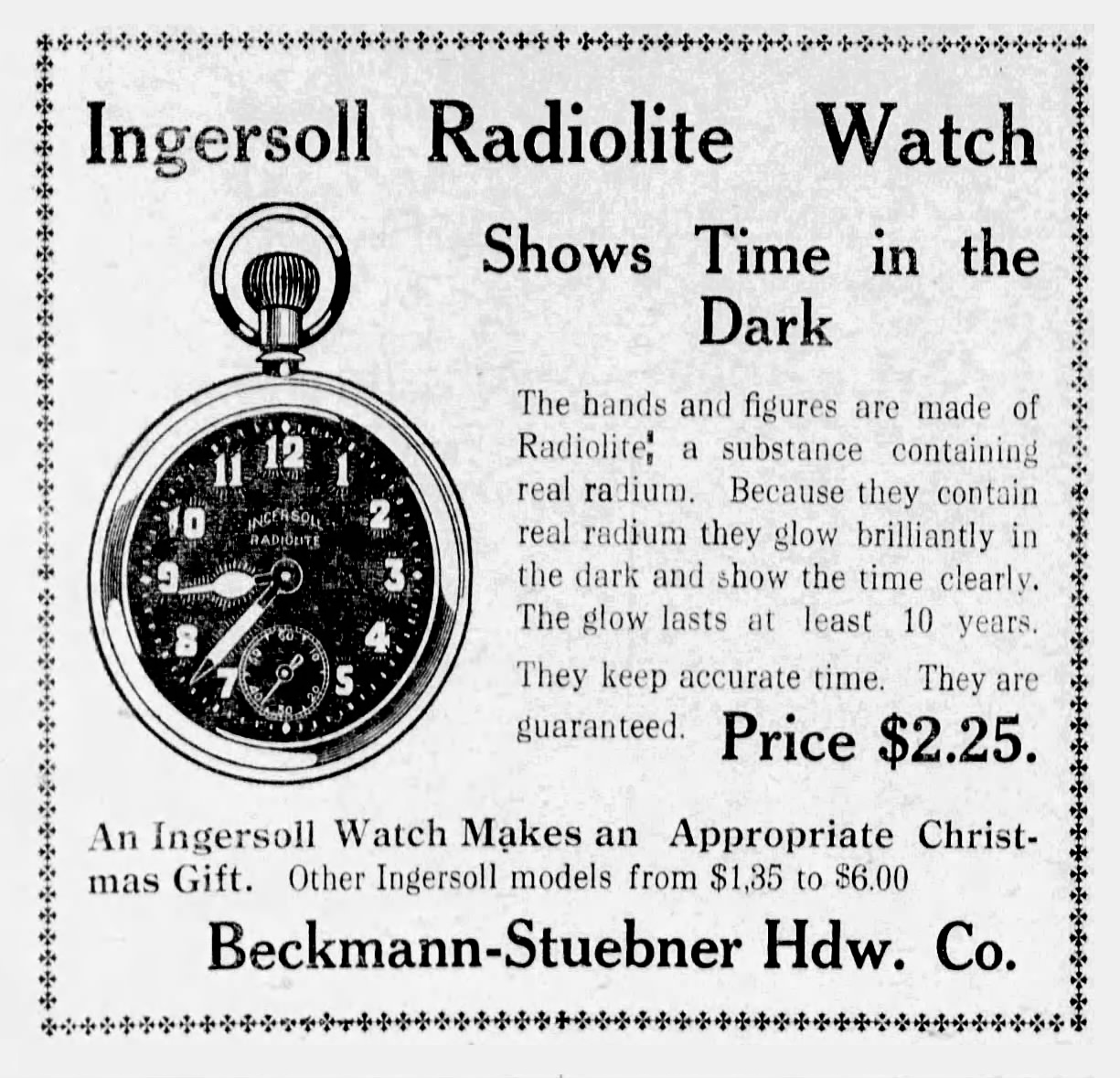
November 1917 ad for an Ingersoll "Radiolite" watch, one of the first watches mass marketed in the USA featuring a radium-illuminated dial.

Radium was discovered by Marie and Pierre Curie in 1898 and was soon combined with paint to make luminescent paint, which was applied to clocks, airplane instruments, and the like, to be able to read them in the dark.

In 1914, Dr. Sabin Arnold von Sochocky and Dr. George S. Willis founded the Radium Luminous Material Corporation. The company made luminescent paint. The company later changed its name to the United States Radium Corporation. The use of radium to provide luminescence for hands and indices on watches soon followed.

The Ingersoll Watch division of the Waterbury Clock Company, a nationally-known maker of low-cost pocket and wristwatches, was a leading popularizer of the use of radium for watch hands and indices through the introduction of their "Radiolite" watches in 1916. The Radiolite series, made in various sizes and models, became a signature of the Connecticut-based company.

Radium dials were typically painted by young women, who used to 'point' their brushes by licking and shaping the bristles prior to painting the fine lines and numbers on the dials. This practice resulted in the ingestion of radium, which caused serious jaw-bone degeneration and malignancy and other dental diseases. The disease, radium-induced osteonecrosis, was recognized as an occupational disease in 1925 after a group of radium painters, known as the Radium Girls, from the United States Radium Corporation sued. By 1930, all dial painters stopped pointing their brushes by mouth. Stopping this practice drastically reduced the amount of radium ingested and therefore, the incidence of malignancy.

Luminous Processes employees interviewed by a journalist in 1978, the year the company plant was shut down, stated they had been left ignorant of radium's dangers. They were told that eliminating lip-pointing had ended earlier problems. They worked in unvented rooms, they wore smocks that they laundered at home. Geiger counters could pick up readings from pants returned from a dry cleaner and from clothes stored away in a cedar chest."

== Safety ==
Wristwatch produced for the US Army during World War II showing characteristic sandy deterioration of radium–zinc sulfide painted hands and numbers. Such a watch should not be opened due to the danger of inhalation of airborne particles.

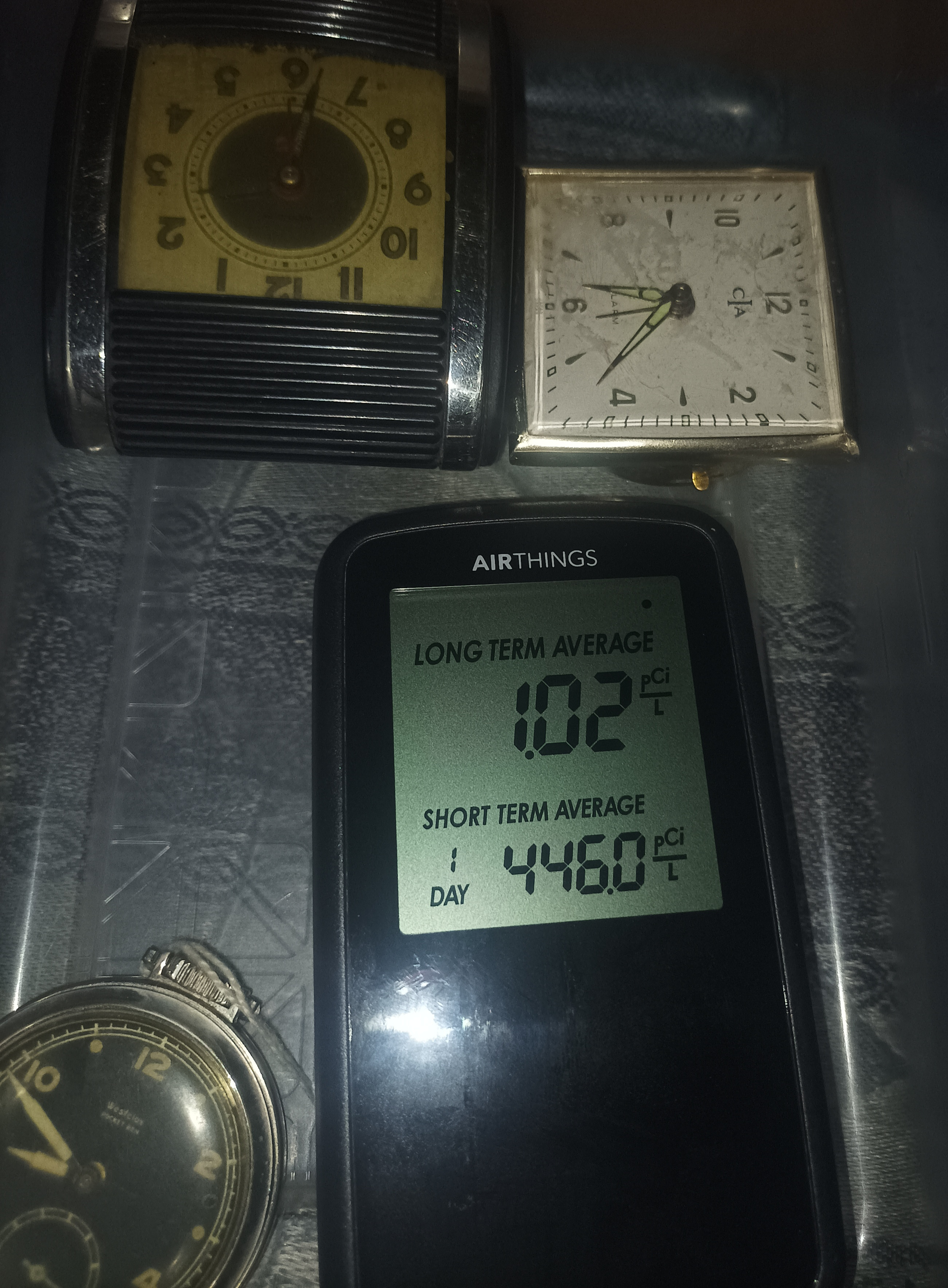
Three radium dials and a radon detector are placed in a sealed plastic container. After 6 hours, the radon level was 446 pCi/L.

Radium is highly radioactive, emitting alpha, beta, and gamma radiation — the effects of which are particularly deleterious if inhaled or ingested since there is no shielding within the body. The body treats radium as it does calcium, storing it in bone where it may cause bone degeneration and cancer. Inhaled or ingested particles may deposit a high local dose with a risk of radiation-caused lung or gastrointestinal cancer. Ingestion of radium has also been linked to anemia, cataracts, broken teeth, and reduced bone growth. Penetrating gamma radiation produced by some dials also represents a significant health risk.

According to the United States Environmental Protection Agency, "radioactive antiques [including watches] are usually not a health risk as long as they are intact and in good condition." Accordingly, watches with radium dials should not be taken apart without proper training, technique, and facilities, as radium paint can be ingested by inhaling flaking paint particles. Although old radium dials generally no longer produce light, this is due to the breakdown of the crystal structure of the luminous zinc sulfide rather than the radioactive decay of the radium. The radium isotope (^{226}Ra) used has a half-life of about 1,600 years.

Chronic exposure to high levels of radium can result in an increased incidence of bone, liver, or breast cancer as shown by studies of the Radium Girls. Decaying radium also produces the gas radon, recognized as the second leading cause of lung cancer in the United States and the United Kingdom. A 2018 study by researchers from the University of Northampton found that a collection of 30 vintage military watches with radium dials kept in a small, unventilated room produced a radon concentration 134 times greater than the UK's recommended "safe" level.

== Regulation ==
Radium was initially touted as a positively salutary substance, as this January 1922 ad from the Buffalo Times illustrates.

In the United States there does not seem to have ever been prohibitory legislation passed banning the use of radium in clocks and watches. It was only with the passage of the Energy Policy Act of 2005 that the United States Nuclear Regulatory Commission (NRC) was given oversight of the use of radium. Prior to that date, "the federal government had a limited role, if any, in ensuring the safe use of radium," according to the NRC. The element was phased out of use by industry acting under its own volition as superior and safer luminous materials entered the marketplace.

== Brands ==
- Undark produced by the United States Radium Corporation
- Luna produced by the Radium Dial Company
- Marvelite produced by the Cold Light Manufacturing Company (a subsidiary of the Radium Company of Colorado)

== See also ==
- Radioactive phosphors
- Uranium glass
- Super-LumiNova
