= United States Radium Corporation =

US company and Superfund site

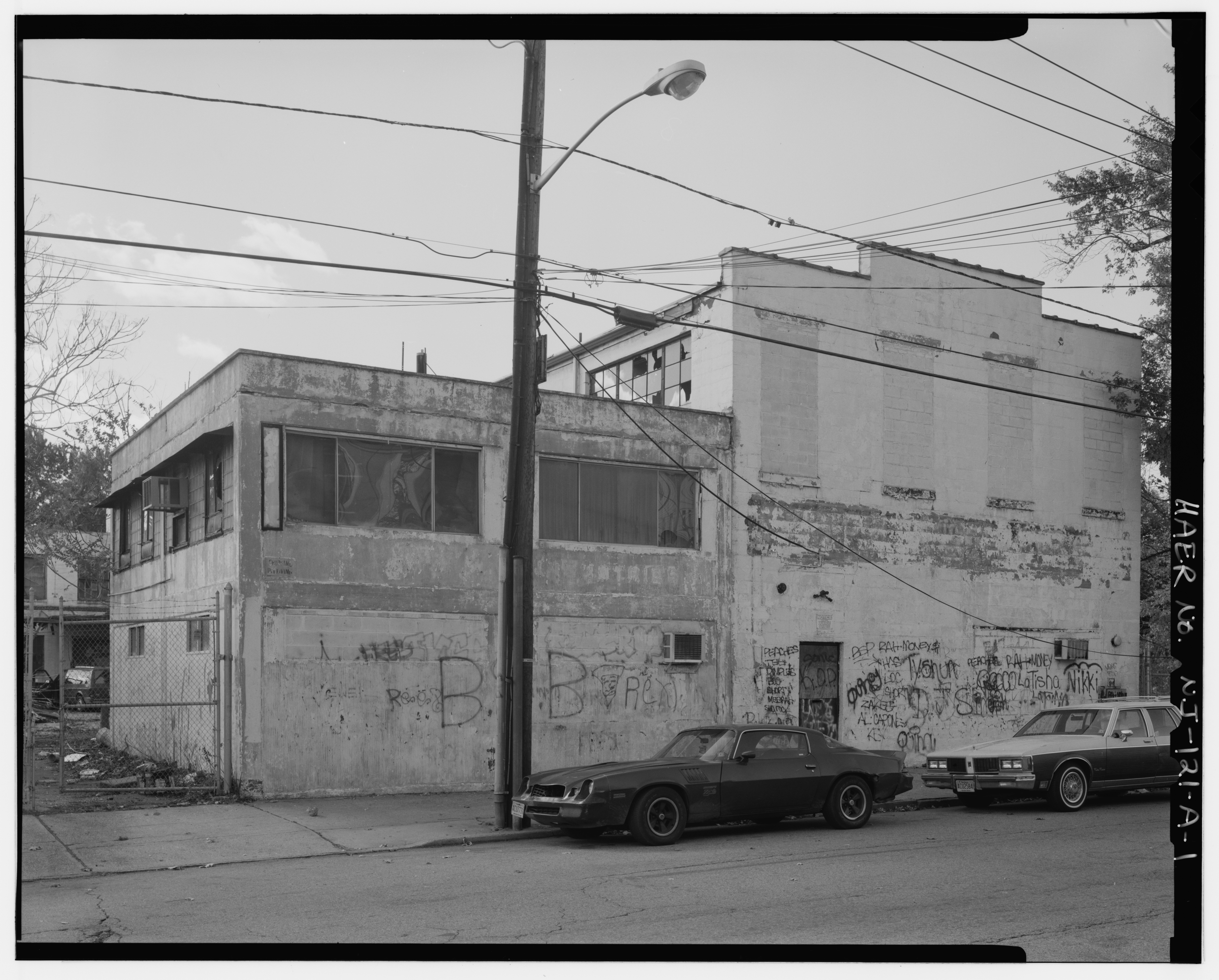
- Former U.S. Radium Corp. paint application building, c.1995, in Orange, NJ
- Formerly: Radium Luminous Material Corporation
- Type: Private
- Founded: 1914; 112 years ago in New York City, New York, U.S.
- Founders: Dr. Sabin Arnold von Sochocky; Dr. George S. Willis
- Defunct: May 1970; 56 years ago
- Fate: Merger
- Successor: Safety Light Corporation (1982-2007)
- Headquarters: United States
- Products: Glow-in-the-dark radioactive paint
- Subsidiaries: Safety Light Corporation (1979-1982); USR Chemical Products; USR Lighting; USR Metals; U.S. Natural Resources
- Superfund site
- Location: Orange, Essex County, New Jersey

Information
- CERCLIS ID: NJD980654172
- Contaminants: Cadmium, Radium-228, radon, radionuclide, Thorium-230, Thorium-232, Uranium-234, Uranium-235, Uranium-238, Vanadium(V) oxide

Progress
- Proposed: December 30, 1982
- Listed: September 8, 1983
- Construction completed: September 28, 2006
- Partially deleted: August 23, 2004

The United States Radium Corporation was a company, most notorious for its operations between the years 1917 to 1926 in Orange, New Jersey, in the United States that led to stronger worker protection laws. After initial success in developing a glow-in-the-dark radioactive paint, the company was subject to several lawsuits in the late 1920s in the wake of severe illnesses and deaths of workers (the Radium Girls) who had ingested radioactive material. The workers had been told that the paint was harmless. During World War I and World War II, the company produced luminous watches and gauges for the United States Army for use by soldiers.

U.S. Radium workers, especially women who painted the dials of watches and other instruments with luminous paint, suffered serious radioactive contamination. Lawyer Edward Markley was in charge of defending the company in these cases.

== History ==
The company was founded in 1914 in New York City, by Dr. Sabin Arnold von Sochocky and Dr. George S. Willis, as the Radium Luminous Material Corporation. The company produced uranium from carnotite ore and eventually moved into the business of producing radioluminescent paint, and then to the application of that paint. Over the next several years, it opened facilities in Newark, Jersey City, and Orange. In August 1921, von Sochocky was forced from the presidency, and the company was renamed the United States Radium Corporation, Arthur Roeder became the president of the company. In Orange, where radium was extracted from 1917 to 1926, the U.S. Radium facility processed half a ton of ore per day. The ore was obtained from "Undark mines" in Paradox Valley, Colorado and in Utah.

A notable employee from 1921 to 1923 was Victor Francis Hess, who would later receive the Nobel Prize in Physics.

The company's luminescent paint, marketed as Undark, was a mixture of radium and zinc sulfide, with the radiation causing the sulfide to fluoresce. During World War I, demand for dials, watches, and aircraft instruments painted with Undark surged, and the company expanded operations considerably. The delicate task of painting watch and gauge faces was done mostly by young women, who were instructed to maintain a fine tip on their paintbrushes by licking them.

At the time, the dangers of radiation were not well understood. Around 1920, a similar radium dial business, known as the Radium Dial Company, a division of the Standard Chemical Company, opened in Chicago. It soon moved its dial painting operation to Ottawa, Illinois to be closer to its major customer, the Westclox Clock Company. Several workers died, and the health risks associated with radium were allegedly known, but this company continued dial painting operations until 1940.

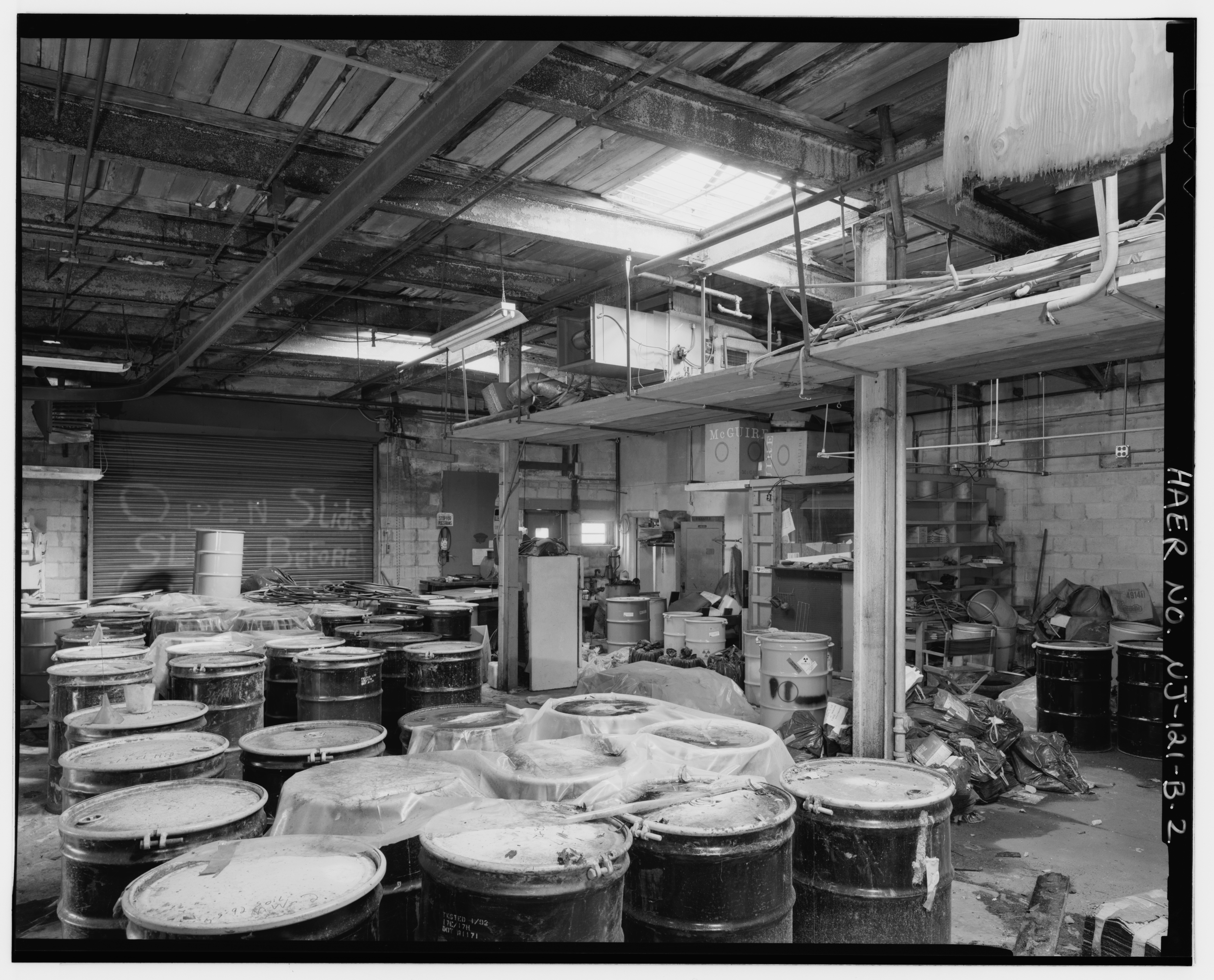
Radium Crystallization Laboratory, Orange, NJ

U.S. Radium's management and scientists took precautions such as masks, gloves, and screens, but did not similarly equip the workers. Unbeknownst to the women, the paint was highly radioactive and therefore, carcinogenic. The ingestion of the paint by the women, brought about while licking the brushes, resulted in a condition called radium jaw (radium necrosis), a painful swelling and porosity of the upper and lower jaws that ultimately led to many of their deaths. This led to litigation against U.S. Radium by the so-called Radium Girls, starting with former dial painter Marguerite Carlough in 1925. The case was eventually settled in 1926 and several more suits were brought against the company in 1927 by Grace Fryer and Katherine Schaub. The company did not stop the hand painting of dials until 1947.

The company struggled after World War I: the loss of military contracts sharply reduced demand for luminescent paint and dials, and in 1922, high-grade ore was discovered in Katanga, driving all U.S. suppliers out of business except U.S. Radium and the Standard Chemical Company. U.S. Radium consolidated its operations in Manhattan in 1927, leasing out the Orange plant and selling off other property. But demand for luminescent products surged again during World War II; by 1942, it employed as many as 1,000 workers, and in 1944 was reported to have radium mining, processing, and application facilities in Bloomsburg, Pennsylvania; Bernardsville, New Jersey; Whippany, New Jersey; and North Hollywood, California as well as New York City. In 1945 the Office of Strategic Services enlisted the company's help for tests of a psychological-warfare scheme to release foxes with glowing paint in Japan.

After the war came another period of retrenchment. Not only did military supply contracts end, but luminous dial manufacturing shifted to promethium-147 and tritium. Also, radium mining in Canada ceased in 1954, driving up supply costs. In that year, the company consolidated its operations at facilities in Morristown, New Jersey and South Centre Township east of Bloomsburg, Pennsylvania. In Bloomsburg, it continued to produce items with luminescent paint using radium, strontium-90 and cesium-137 such as watch dials, instrument gauge faces, deck markers, and paint. It ceased radium processing altogether in 1968, spinning off those operations as Nuclear Radiation Development Corporation, LLC, based in Grand Island, New York. The following year, a new facility at the Bloomsburg plant opened for the manufacturing of "tritiated metal foils and tritium activated self-luminous light tubes," and the company switched focus to the manufacture of glow-in-the-dark exit and aircraft signs using tritium.

Starting in 1979, the company underwent an extensive reorganization. A new corporation, Metreal, Inc., was created to hold the assets of the Bloomsburg plant. Manufacturing operations were subsequently moved into new wholly owned subsidiary corporations: Safety Light Corporation, USR Chemical Products, USR Lighting, USR Metals, and U.S. Natural Resources. Finally, in May 1980, U.S. Radium created a new holding company, USR Industries, Inc., and merged itself into it.

The Safety Light Corporation, in turn, was sold to its management and spun off as an independent entity in 1982. Tritium-illuminated signs were marketed under the name Isolite, which also became the name of new subsidiary to market and distribute Safety Light Corporation's products.

In 2005, the Nuclear Regulatory Commission declined to renew the licenses for the Bloomsburg facility, and shortly thereafter the EPA added the Bloomsburg facility to the National Priorities List for remediation through Superfund. All tritium operations at the plant ceased by the end of 2007.

== Immediate aftermath ==
The chief medical examiner of Essex County, New Jersey, Harrison Stanford Martland, MD, published a report in 1925 that identified the radioactive material the women had ingested as the cause of their bone disease and aplastic anemia, and ultimately death.

Illness and death resulting from ingestion of radium paint and the subsequent legal action taken by the women forced closure of the company's Orange facility in 1927. The case was settled out of court in 1928, but not before a substantial number of the litigants were seriously ill or had died from bone cancer and other radiation-related illnesses. The company, it was alleged, deliberately delayed settling litigation, leading to further deaths.

In November 1928, Dr. von Sochocky, the inventor of the radium-based paint, died of aplastic anemia resulting from his exposure to the radioactive material, "a victim of his own invention."

The victims were so contaminated that radiation could still be detected at their graves in 1987 using a Geiger counter.

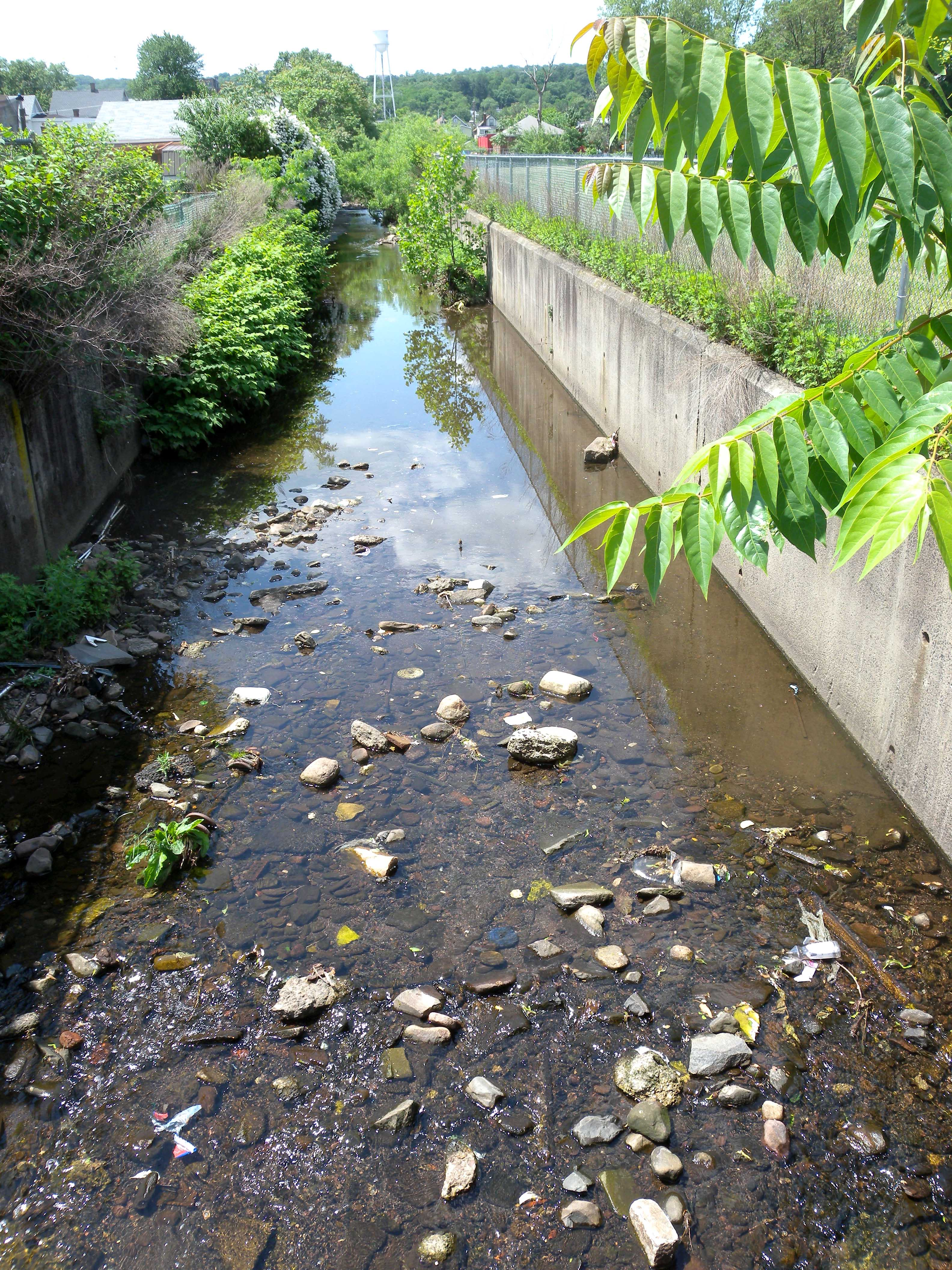
The Second River flows past the factory site

== Superfund site ==
The company processed about 1,000 pounds of ore daily while in operation, which was dumped on the site. The radon and radiation resulting from the 1,600 tons of material on the abandoned factory resulted in the site's designation as a Superfund site by the United States Environmental Protection Agency in 1983. From 1997 through 2005, the EPA remediated the site in a process that involved the excavation and off-site disposal of radium-contaminated material at the former plant site, and at 250 residential and commercial properties that had been contaminated in the intervening decades. In 2009, the EPA wrapped up their long-running Superfund cleanup effort.

== See also ==
- Undark
- Radium dials
- Radium Girls
- Radiation poisoning
- Radium Dial Company
