= Gaps in regulation of chemical agents =

Despite the best efforts of the government, health, and environmental agencies, improper use of hazardous chemicals is pervasive in commercial products, and can yield devastating effects, from people developing brittle bones and severe congenital defects, to strips of wildlife laying dead by poisoned rivers.

== Agriculture ==
=== Mevinphos ===
Mevinphos is a broad spectrum of insecticides that are used on a wide variety of crops, including apples, peaches, strawberries, nectarines, celery, and cucumbers. They belong to the chemical group known as organophosphates, which have neural toxic effects, not in only insecticides, but also in birds, fish, amphibians, and mammals. While not carcinogenic, mevinphos are potent via all means of exposure, including absorption, ingestion, and inhalation. Organophosphates inhibit acetylcholinesterase (AChE), an enzyme responsible for regulating levels of the muscle-stimulating neurotransmitter, acetylcholine (ACh). This results in high levels of acetylcholine levels in the body, which causes nearly every muscle in the body to be stimulated without cessation. Symptoms of organophosphate poisoning include violent convulsions, vomiting, miosis, lachrymation, sweating, salivation, diarrhea, and potentially death.

Most nerve gases, including sarin, soman, and tabun, are organophosphates, which are all banned by the Geneva Convention of 1925, as they are deemed a war crime.

From 1981 to 1984, 1,156 people consisting of field workers and agricultural officials in Salinas Valley, California were reported to have been exposed to mevinphos, developing insecticide-related illnesses. The exposure began on April 23, 1981, when the field was sprayed with mevinphos at 5:00 am that morning, despite a cancellation order having been given the day before. Later that morning at 7:00 am, 44 field workers began harvesting iceberg lettuce on the farm. Two hours later, many of these workers developed symptoms of dizziness, headaches, eye irritation, visual disturbances, and nausea.

Thirty-one farm workers along with three agricultural officials who were in the field that morning were sent to a local hospital to be tested for plasma cholinesterase, which looks at two substances levels that are necessary for the nervous system to work properly. Two workers were kept in the hospital for further observation and treatment due to respiratory complications. Two other people had levels of plasma cholinesterase below normal limit. The rest of the workers were disrobed, hosed down with water, asked to get dressed, go home, and wash their clothes at home. No one was told not to come to work the next day. However, due to ongoing symptoms, many of the workers were not able to report to work the next morning. A union representative arranged for 29 workers to be taken to a second hospital for further testing and evaluation. One person was hospitalized due to bradycardia.

The National Institute for Occupational Safety and Health (NIOSH) began an investigation on April 24 working closely with staff from the second hospital during this acute phase of this incident. The 29 workers reported the following signs and symptoms: “eye irritation (76%), headache (48%), visual disturbances (48%), dizziness (41%), nausea (38%), fatigue (28%), chest pain or shortness of breath (21%), skin irritation (17%), fasciculation of the eyelids (10%), fasciculation of muscles in the arm (7%), excessive sweating (7%), and diarrhea (7%), with twenty-two (76%) of the workers reporting three or more symptoms or signs.”

The workers were tested approximately every week over the course of 8 to 12 weeks. When initially tested the first week, everyone's plasm cholinesterase and red blood cell (RBC) cholinesterase was above normal levels. Test levels from the following week increase by 5% and the week after that by 14%. Over the course of time, their levels kept increasing. This is believed to be due to organophosphates inhibiting the enzyme, cholinesterase, resulting in toxic effects by allowing an increase of the neurotransmitter in the nervous system. It is not known how many other cases were not reported and followed from this incident.

Mevinphos is considered among the ten highest health risk posing pesticides and reported to have acute total illnesses in 1984–1990, low oral LD50, and a low Reference Dose (RfD). On February 28, 1994, the California Environmental Protection Agency, Pesticide and Environmental Toxicology Section, recommended the cancellation of mevinphos use in California due to the inability to implement safe mitigative measures and the inability to prevent unacceptable dietary and worker exposures.

=== Dichlorodiphenyltrichloroethane (DDT) and Organochlorines ===
Following the end of WWII, the production of organochlorines, such as DDT, Polychlorinated Biphenyls (PCBs), and other synthetic chemicals were developed for use in agriculture. These purposes included insecticides, fungicides, and in some cases, fire retardants; while effective for agriculture and forest services, these chemicals are known lipophiles (meaning that they attach to fat cells in organisms) and have been shown to bioaccumulate, passing from prey to predator and from mother to offspring throughout embryonic development and lactation. Studies have shown that exposure to organochlorines like DDT can lead to increased risks of pancreatic cancer, non-Hodgkin’s lymphoma, impaired lactation, possible male infertility and testicular cancers, and DDT poisoning in those who work to manufacture the chemicals.

Rachel Carson's exposé novel, Silent Spring, is largely accredited for spurring public awareness of the ecological and human health impacts of organochlorines such as DDT. Her work began a national movement to ban chemicals, such as DDT. However, chemical companies responded with backlash claiming that her work was falsified and DDT was not banned until 1972. Since then, many other organochlorines have been placed under similar restrictions and bans, yet there are few regulations in place for new organochlorines being produced in labs. This lack of regulation has raised concerns among members of the environmental community about the hazards of these unstudied pollutants not being monitored by the United States Environmental Protection Agency (EPA), especially in light of budget cuts and bureaucratic inefficacy.

=== General regulation of pesticides ===
All pesticides in the U.S. must be reviewed by the Environmental Protection Agency (EPA), under the regulations of the Federal Insecticide, Fungicide, and Rodenticide Act (FIFRA), at least once every 15 years.

The EPA defines “pesticides” in the FIFRA by four criteria:

1. Claims - The product is claimed or advertised by its distributor as a pesticide.
2. Composition - The compound contains at least one active ingredient that has no commercial value besides for pesticidal purposes.
3. Knowledge that the substances will be used as a pesticide - The distributor has "actual or constructive knowledge" that the product will be used as a pesticide, regardless if the product is not claimed or advertised as one.
4. Plant growth regulators - The product is intended to introduce physiological changes to plants that affect their growth in any way.

== Commercial and industrial uses ==
=== Radium ===
Radium is a radioactive element that is naturally found at low levels in the environment from uranium and thorium decay. It can be found virtually everywhere, including the soil, water, rocks, and flora. As radium is naturally everywhere in the environment, all humans are almost always exposed to radium. At natural levels, radium is quite benign. However, at excessive levels, radium poisoning can occur. When the body takes in radium, it perceives it as calcium. Consequently, the body fills bones with radium, which can lead to brittle bones, collapsed spines, and teeth to fall out.

Radium was discovered in 1898 by Marie and Pierre Curie. In the early 1900s it was used as radiation treatment for cancer. Expansion of radium's use in medical practices was earnestly attempted in the treatment of rheumatism and mental disorders. However, these pursuits were unsuccessful.

==== Radium Girls ====
Due to radium's luminescent properties, American inventor William J. Hammer mixed radium with glue and zinc sulfide to make glow-in-the-dark paint. This paint was used by the U.S. Radium Corporation and named Undark. The paint was primarily used for wristwatch dials. Further application of the paint reached military equipment after the company accepted a contract with the U.S. government during WWI.

Starting in 1916, the U.S. Radium Corporation established factories in New Jersey that recruited dozens of women to paint the watch dials with Undark. No safety equipment were given to the women, nor were any precautions taken. The women were instructed to frequently lick the paint brushes, in order to keep them wet and shaped to a fine point. Throughout every day, the women's clothes and skin were covered in radium paint. This led to the women developing fatal radium poisoning.

By the mid-1920s dozens upon dozens of these women were falling ill and dying from prolonged, horrific deaths. The radium they ingested was dissolving their bones from the inside, causing severe pain and enormous deformities with pieces of their bodies easily breaking and falling off. By 1927, over 50 women died from radium poisoning.

A smaller number of these female workers tried suing the company, not only for financial compensation to pay for their large medical bills and to afford themselves income to be able to live out the rest of their lives, but also to expose the company to their wrongful doing. Dial painter, Grace Fryer, as well as four other women sued U.S. Radium for $250,000. However, this lawsuit was unsuccessful because of U.S. Radium's vast team of lawyers and contractual affiliation with the U.S. government. The women were so desperate to afford medical treatment and food, that they had to settle for $10,000 each and a $600 annual payment. All five women died within two years after the settlement.

The fate of the Radium Girls raised a lot of national concern for workers’ health rights and conditions. After the incident, precautions and safety equipment were mandated to protect workers handling radioactive material in several occupations. The Manhattan Project notably used fume hoods, personal protective equipment, sanitation, and frequent checks for contamination, in order to prevent a repeat of the Radium Girls tragedy. In 1949, the U.S. Congress passed a law that compensates workers for occupational illnesses.

==== Environmental regulation ====
By the time World War II began, safety limits for handling radiation had been set by the federal government.

In 1934, the International Commission on Radiological Protection (ICRP) established a tolerance dose for workers of 0.2 roentgens of radiation exposure to workers per day. In 1936, the National Committee on Radiation Protection and Measurements (NCRP) reduced the limit to 0.1 roentgens per day which held through World War II. From 1936 through 1977 there were continual revisions by professional scientists and the government agencies as to what constituted safe doses. By the end of World War II, arguments between the U.S. military leaders and civilian officials ensued as to what were considered best practices to controlling nuclear energy and repressing fabrication of nuclear weapons by other nations. This led to the dispute in going to congress and resulting in congress passing the Atomic Energy Act (AEA) of 1946.

The EPA was created in 1970 to accept certain functions and responsibilities from other federal agencies and departments. Since its inception, the EPA has run environmental programs that address radioactive waste disposal sites, off-site monitoring around nuclear power plants, and keeps an eye on natural sources of radioactivity, such as radon.

The EPA has developed guidance on topics such as occupational radiation limits and exposures for federal agencies and members of the public. The EPA can offer recommendations on quality assurance programs for nuclear medicine under its FRC-derived authority.

=== Mercury ===
Mercury is a naturally occurring element in the Earth’s lithosphere that can be found in its elemental, inorganic, and organic-compounded forms. It is often found in coal deposits and regions rich in fossil fuels.

==== Mercury pollution ====
Like other heavy metals, mercury can be released from both natural and anthropogenic sources. Mercury from natural sources (such as soil/sedimentary erosion or volcanic eruptions) accounts for a small percentage of rising mercury levels. Meanwhile, the release of industrial mercury from mining and fossil fuel combustion has led to heightened mercury pollution in the atmosphere. In fact, fossil fuel combustion accounts for 45% of human mercury release.

==== Environmental and human health impacts ====
Mercury exposures are variant, relative to the degree of exposure, demographics of the individual exposed, and the mercury form or compound that they are exposed to. Because it is a neurotoxin, mercury can be particularly damaging to developing fetuses when exposed in vitro and young children. Inhalation of mercury gas is more deadly and can cause kidney failure and respiratory problems if not treated. From an ecological perspective, mercury is concerning because of its ability to bioaccumulate in food chains, particularly in marine environments. For this reason, the EPA advises against the regular consumption of fish and shellfish that are documented to contain high levels of mercury, especially for pregnant and nursing mothers and young children.

==== Environmental regulation ====
In recent years the United States Environmental Protection Agency has established policies to mitigate atmospheric mercury release from the combustion of fossil fuels and waste. These policies include the 2011 Mercury and Air Toxics Standards which require that power plants use controls and technologies that mitigate mercury pollution. Between 2011 and 2013, additional policies were applied to municipal and medical waste management facilities mandating that all sewage and waste containing mercury cannot be incinerated. Earlier standards from 1991 also established a maximum contaminant level, or MCM, of 0.002 mg of mercury per liter of municipal drinking water. Legal measures such as the Clean Air and Clean Water Acts, Safe Drinking Water Act, and the Resource Conservation and Recovery Act also set standards for pollutant release and clean-up for the United States.

=== Perfluorooctanoic acid (PFOA) ===
Perfluorooctanoic acid, a.k.a. PFOA or C8, is a synthetic chemical surfactant that is often used in the process of making non-stick cookware. PFOA is extremely bio-persistent, with a half-life of 8 years in humans. PFOA can stay in the environment and the human body over long periods of time, and can have harmful effects to people exposed in high doses.

==== Clean blood study ====
A worldwide study was conducted to compare “clean blood,” i.e., blood without C8 as a control with blood that contains C8, in order to illuminate the hazardous effects on humans. However, “clean blood,” could not be found from participants because 99% across the globe had derivatives of C8 found in their blood. Instead, samples of preserved blood from American Soldiers during the Korean War were used as the control. The blood was obtained in 1950, a year before Teflon was ever sold to the public. None of the preserved blood was found to contain C8, strongly suggesting that the worldwide use of Teflon caused a nigh-ubiquitous absence of “clean blood.”

==== DuPont and 3M ====
PFOA has been used to make Teflon, a non-stick cookware by the chemical company DuPont, since 1951. Fortunately for consumers, it does not exist in significant amounts in the final product of Teflon that could cause noticeable harm upon normal use. However, DuPont and 3M workers that handle PFOA, as well as people who live near the plants, are not as fortunate. Starting in the early 1950s, PFOA was released by DuPont into private wells and the Ohio River without disclosure to the public of EPA. Although both companies conducted independent studies demonstrating the harmful side effects of PFOA exposure, these results were hidden from the public as a result of the EPA’s self-reporting policy on chemical toxicology in manufacturing.

===== Health risks and birth defects =====
The 2012 C8 Science Panel conducted a survey using blood samples from approximately 69,000 residents of regions with heightened PFOA levels as a result of a class action lawsuit against DuPont to determine correlations between PFOA exposure and chronic illnesses. Those surveyed had a range of PFOA levels from 0.2-22,412 μg/L, with a median exposure of 28.2 μg/L. These levels were significantly higher than the levels detected in the general American population, which had a median exposure of 3.9μg/L. Results from the study concluded that PFOA exposure was linked to pancreatic cancer and testicular cancer, among other conditions, and possible correlations with kidney and prostate cancer. Other chronic conditions included high cholesterol, thyroid disease, ulcerative colitis, pre-eclampsia, and hypertension.

In 1981, two babies of female workers have been found to have eye-related defects. In 1986, Buck Bailey was born with a single nostril, a serrated eyelid, and a keyhole pupil, due to his mother being exposed to PFOA on a daily basis when she worked at DuPont.

Known as a “forever chemical” PFOAs do not biodegrade naturally and thus, are at a high risk for bioaccumulation in exposed populations if governmental regulators do not take action. The conclusions from the C8 Panel were used to justify medical monitoring among all residents affected by PFOA exposure at the expense of DuPont, however, some claims remain disputed by the chemical giant.

===== Contamination of drinking water in Parkersburg, WV =====
It was not until the early 1990s that the toxic effects of PFOA became a public concern. Wilbur Tennant, a farmer who lives on his own private land near the DuPont plant in Parkersburg, West Virginia, videotaped the calamitous effects of PFOA on his cattle and local wildlife. Calves were born with black teeth and opaque eyes. Several cows and deer were found dead by the stream. As it turned out, DuPont was dumping large amounts of waste PFOA into local streams that fed into Parkersburg's town water supply. So much waste PFOA was dumped that DuPont quickly lost count. Eventually, children were noticed to have black teeth, much like the calves in Tennant's farm.

Wilbur Tennant filed a lawsuit with environmental lawyer, Robert Billot, who also started a class-action lawsuit with nearly 80,000 plaintiffs in the same year as a result of the widespread impacts of PFOA chemicals across six water districts polluted by DuPont. The class-action lawsuit settled for $343 million in damages to residents and DuPont was ordered to pay for costs of medical monitoring.

===== Phasing out C8 =====
In 2003, 3M phased out C8 for C4 in attempt to avoid public backlash. They urged DuPont to do the same. Instead, DuPont seized the opportunity to become the sole manufacturer of C8 and increased production. This lasted until the EPA banned the production of C8 in 2013. DuPont soon substituted C8 with Gen-X, which is a chemical that has not yet been researched or regulated. In order to detach their name from the toxic reputation of PFOA's, DuPont created the spin-off company, Chemours, to handle production and continued dumping of Gen-X.

After facing several class-action lawsuits, DuPont paid 43,000 residents of Ohio each $400 to participate in a study to determine whether C8 could be linked to any diseases. Participation in the study also required each person to waive their rights to sue DuPont if no links could be made. The study lasted over seven years and grew to almost 70,000 participants, including West Virginia residents. The results were concluded in 2012. Six diseases were linked: “testicular and kidney cancer, ulcerative colitis, thyroid disease, pre-eclampsia, and high cholesterol.”

==== DuPont's public relations with Parkersburg, WV ====
Part of the reason it has been difficult for residents of Parkersburg, West Virginia to challenge DuPont is because the chemical company makes large contributions to the local economy, education system, and local government. There are even buildings and a street named after DuPont.

==== Environmental regulation ====
The struggles to regulate and determine the toxicity of synthetic chemicals are strongly reflected in the case of DuPont’s PFOA pollution. Because the EPA only regulates chemicals that have been proven toxic and uses a self-reporting system, past uses of synthetic chemicals have gone unregulated until health risks are observed, as seen with the case of C8 and PFOA. This lack of communication between the EPA and potential polluters is one of the reasons that many policies aimed at widespread chemical regulation often fail. Current EPA policies are looking to increase involvement in reporting to reduce these breaches, however, cuts to the EPA budget limit the feasibility of these goals without resources to expand their workforce.

Legal fees, lawsuits, and governmental fines have been used to discourage companies from releasing untested chemicals into the environment, however, these are often insignificant when compared to the net worth of the company. So long as the market exists for these products (as seen with the successes of Teflon) companies are likely to continue valuing their profits over environmental and health concerns.

PFOA is a group of chemicals that are still being studied. To date EPA has not yet established statutory clean-up levels for PFOA. However, the agency has established health advisory levels for these substances based on EPA's assessment of the latest peer-reviewed science. This advisory is meant to provide states, tribal and local officials, and drinking water system operators, information on the health risks due to these chemicals in order to enable these people to take appropriate measures to protect their communities. EPA has established a health advisory number of 70 parts per trillion for PFOA in drinking water to provide a conservative margin of protection to the most sensitive populations, thus ensuring protection for everyone.

Recent settlements between the EPA and Dupont/Chemours have worked to improve the lives and environment of residents near the Washington Works plant in Parkersburg, WV by mandating that DuPont pay for clean-up efforts in the region under the Safe Drinking Water Act. Technology is not able to fully remove PFOAs and thus, the existing reparations include providing bottled water and installing filtration systems with partial removal abilities.
