= Undark =

Radioactive luminous radium paint produced in the early 20th century

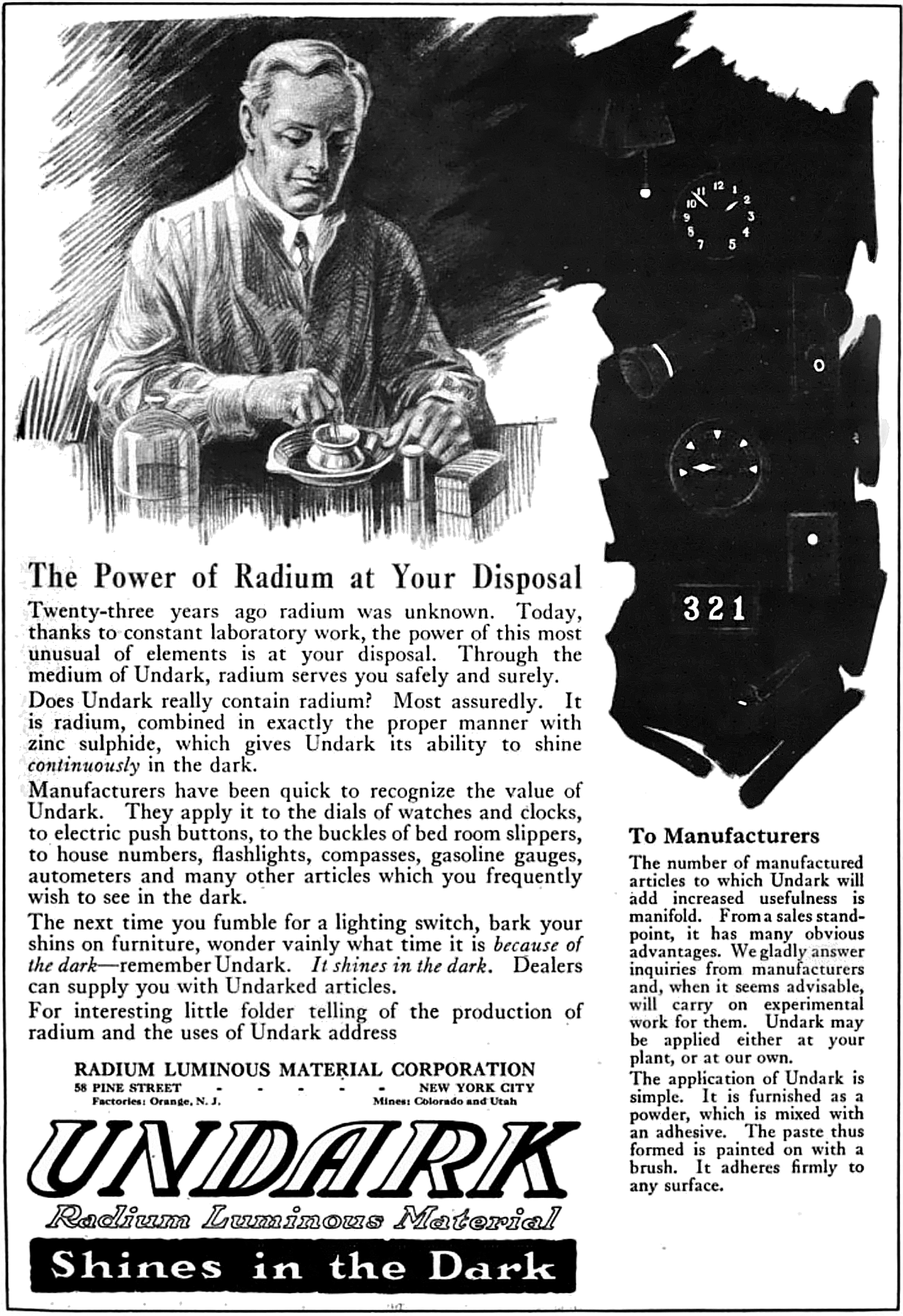
1921 advertisement for Undark

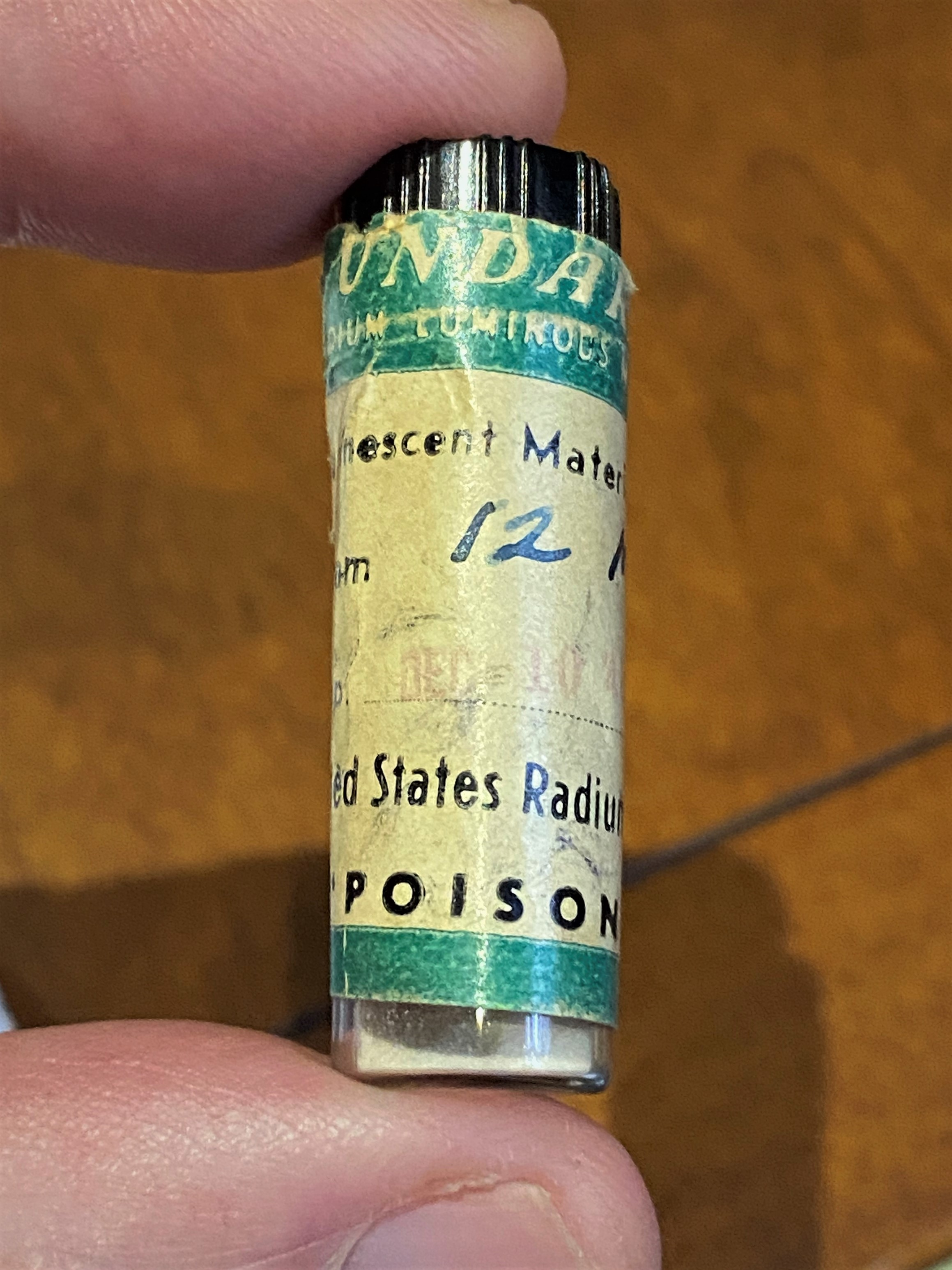
Vial of Undark

Undark was a trade name for luminous paint made with a mixture of radioactive radium and zinc sulfide (RaZnS), as produced by the U.S. Radium Corporation between 1917 and 1926. The U.S. Radium Corporation was based in Orange, New Jersey, but was not the only radium-painting business in the United States. Other big names in the early 1900s include the Radium Dial Company and the Luminous Processes Inc.

== History ==
Radium was discovered by Pierre and Marie Curie in December 1898. Years later, in 1902, an electrical engineer, William J. Hammer, discovered that you could mix radium and zinc into paint, exciting the zinc atoms and giving off a faint blue-green light. Before Undark had its name, luminous paint was first used commercially during World War I. Soldiers used the luminous paint on their instrument dials so they would not give away their position. After World War I, the paint was marketed toward consumers and trademarked as Undark. The U.S. Radium Corporation's radium-processing plant extracted and processed radium from carnotite ore. There, it was combined with other ingredients to create Undark.

== Undark products ==
Undark was used primarily in radium dials for watches and clocks. Undark was also used for compasses, weapon sights, speedometers, telephone mouthpieces, fish bait, locks, and many more articles of use. Undark was also available as a kit for general consumer use and marketed as glow-in-the-dark paint.

== Effects of working with Undark ==
The people working in the industry who applied the radioactive paint became known as the Radium Girls because many of them became ill, and most died from exposure to the radiation emitted by the radium contained within the product. The product was the direct cause of radium jaw, also referred to today as osteoradionecrosis. Radium jaw was the most common side effect because the painters were taught to put the bristles of the paintbrush in their lips to return it to a fine point after each stroke. There are also many accounts of the radium girls decorating themselves with the radioactive luminous paint. Even to this day, there is no cure for radioactive poisoning; the best treatments involve surgical interventions that may remove tissues, muscle, and even bone. The surgical process is called sequestrectomy.

== Aftermath ==
Between 1917 and 1926, radium-226 (^{226}_{88}Ra) was improperly used and disposed of, contaminating the processing plant and surrounding areas in Orange, New Jersey. ^{226}_{88}Ra emits ionizing radiation and decays into radon gas (specifically, the isotope ^{222}_{86}Rn). ^{226}_{88}Ra has a half-life of 1600 years before half of it would naturally decay. Radium was used to illuminate watches under safer practices until around 1968.

== Similar products ==
Mixtures similar to Undark, consisting of radium and zinc sulfide, were used by other companies. Trade names include:

- Luma, used by the Radium Dial Company, a division of Standard Chemical Company
- Marvelite, used by Cold Light Manufacturing Company (a subsidiary of the Radium Company of Colorado)

== See also ==
- Self-powered lighting
