= Radium Dial Company =

Defunct American company

- Industry: Radium paint, radioactive materials
- Founded: 1917; 109 years ago
- Fate: Dissolved
- Headquarters: Ottawa, Illinois, United States
- Key people: Joseph A. Kelly Sr.
- Number of employees: 1000+ (1925)
- Parent: Standard Chemical Company

The Radium Dial Company was one of a few now defunct United States companies, along with the United States Radium Corporation, involved in the painting of clocks, watches and other instrument dials using radioluminescent paint containing radium. The resulting dials are now collectively known as radium dials. The luminous paint used on the dials contained a mixture of zinc sulfide activated with silver, and powdered radium, a product that the Radium Dial Company named Luma. However, unlike the US Radium Corporation, Radium Dial Company was specifically set up to only paint dials, and no other radium processing took place at the premises.

The company is notable for being involved in the radium poisoning of the Radium Girls. The workers in the factories were told that the radium paint was harmless. Radium's negative health effects were well-known at the time, however it was thought that small amounts of radium were not dangerous and even a cure for lack of energy. The workers in the factories consumed deadly amounts of radium due to being told by management to "point" their brushes on their lips for a fine tip. The young workers also used the radium paints to adorn their fingernails, lips and teeth to make them glow. This led to significant health problems and deaths among the company's workforce. The workers eventually sued Radium Dial Company and received financial compensation for their health problems, though the Radium Dial Company continuously appealed so this process took years and many workers had already died of their injuries. This litigation led to significant reforms in workplace safety and eventually led to the establishment of OSHA decades later.

== History ==
The Radium Dial Company was started in 1917 and was in full production of painted dials by 1918. The company was a division of the Standard Chemical Company based in the Marshall Field Annex building in Chicago. In 1920 the company relocated to Peru, Illinois to closer proximity to the clock manufacturer and major customer, Westclox.

By 1922 the company had moved to a former high school building at 1022 Columbus Street in Ottawa, Illinois where it remained until the mid-1930s. At the highest point in production (around 1925), the Radium Dial Company employed around 1,000 young women who turned out around 4,300 dials each day.

The company was headed by Joseph A. Kelly Sr. at the time of its dissolution during the trial. Kelly opened up a new corporation called Luminous Processes Inc. a few blocks away from the Radium Dial Company in Ottawa, Illinois shortly after closing down the Radium Dial Company. Luminous Processes Inc. continued producing fluorescent watch dials powered by radium radioactivity until 1978.

== See also ==
- Radium Girls
- Radium jaw
- Radioluminescence
