= Radium jaw =

Former occupational disease caused by radium, resulting in deformation of the jawbones

Radium jaw, or radium necrosis, is a historic occupational disease brought on by the ingestion and subsequent absorption of radium into the bones of radium dial painters. It also affected those consuming radium-laden patent medicines.

The condition is similar to phossy jaw, an osteoporotic and osteonecrotic illness of matchgirls, brought on by phosphorus ingestion and absorption.

== Symptoms ==
The symptoms are necrosis of the mandible and the maxilla, constant bleeding of the gums, and (usually) after some time, severe distortion due to bone tumors and porosity of the lower jaw. Symptoms also include soreness throughout the body, significant decrease in body weight and loss of teeth.

== Treatment ==
Once the symptoms of radium jaw take effect, there is nothing that can be done to reduce the chance of death. Radium can cause fatal injuries due to radium and calcium sharing similar chemistry, causing the body to unintentionally incorporate the radioactive metal into bone tissue in place of calcium. This is significant, because while calcium strengthens bone structures, radium degrades them. Alpha particles emitted by the radium lead to bone necrosis and bone cancer.

== History ==
At the start of the 20th century, many believed that radium had beneficial health properties and it was often added to consumer products such as toothpaste, hair creams, and even food. Used until the early 1970s, radium was found in some consumer paints (such as Undark), dials on clocks and some industrial applications. Radium was also used in some medical practices during the 20th century.

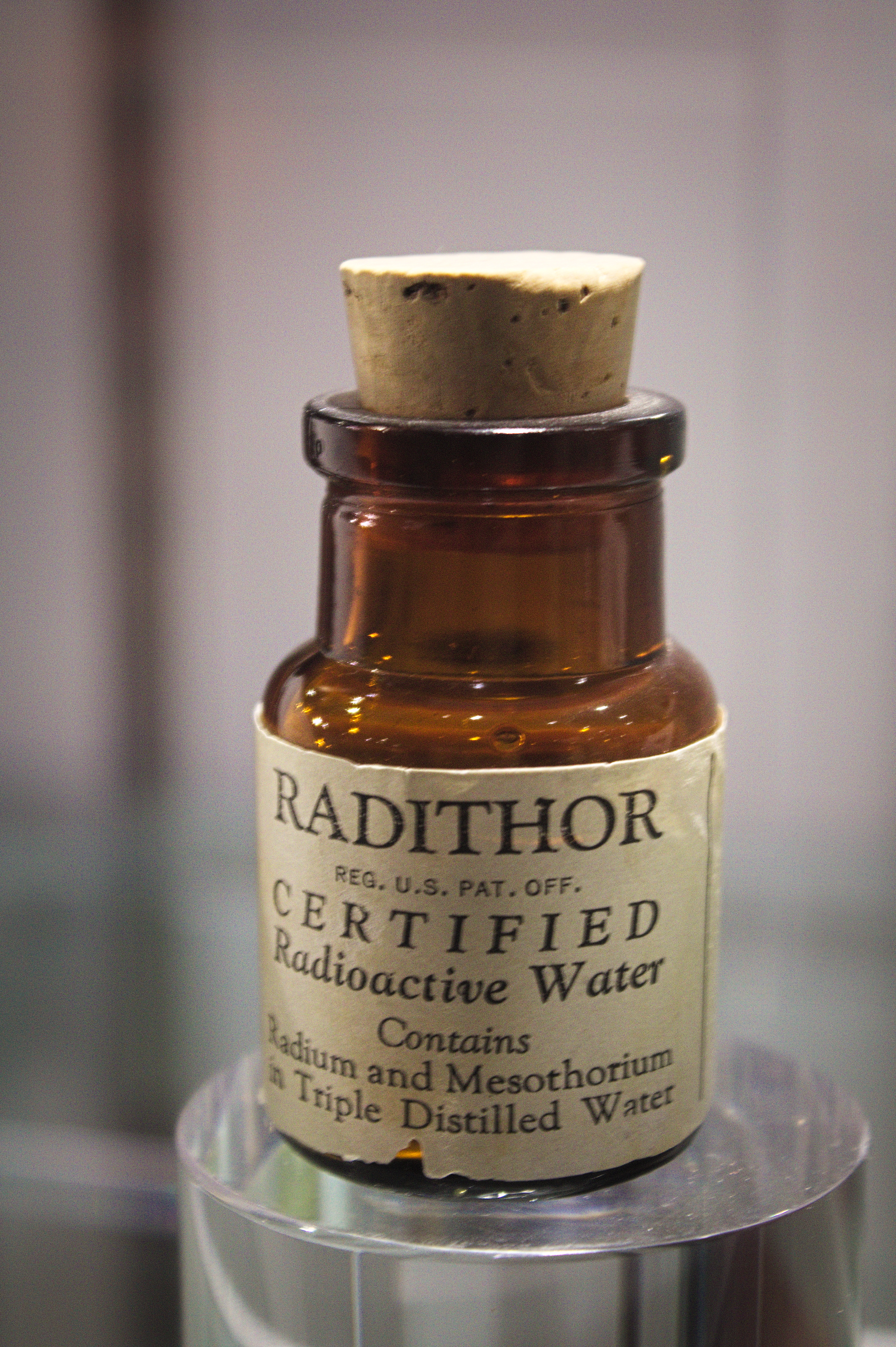
A bottle of Radithor at the National Museum of Nuclear Science & History in New Mexico, United States

The disease was determined by pathologist Dr. H.S. Martland in 1924 to be symptomatic of radium paint ingestion, after many female workers from various radium paint companies reported similar dental and mandibular pain. The first written reference to the disease was by a dentist, Dr. Theodor Blum, in 1924, who described an unusual mandibular osteomyelitis in a dial painter, naming it "radium jaw". Symptoms were present in the mouth due to use of the lips and tongue to keep the radium-paint paintbrushes properly shaped. The disease was the main reason for litigation against the United States Radium Corporation by the Radium Girls, female factory workers who contracted illnesses due to radium exposure from painting watch dials with self-luminous paint in the early 20th century.

A prominent example of this condition was the death of American golfer and industrialist Eben Byers in 1932, after taking large doses of Radithor, a radioactive patent medicine containing radium, over several years. His illness garnered much publicity, and brought the problem of radioactive quack medicines into the public eye.

Stories such as that of the Radium Girls and Eben Byers's death went public and due to public pressure and outrage, the Food and Drug Administration banned most radiation-based patent medicines in 1932.

== See also ==
- Acute radiation syndrome (not involved in radium jaw)
- Radium Dial Company
- Radium dials
- Radium Girls
- Phossy jaw
