= Grace Fryer =

American dial painter and Radium Girl

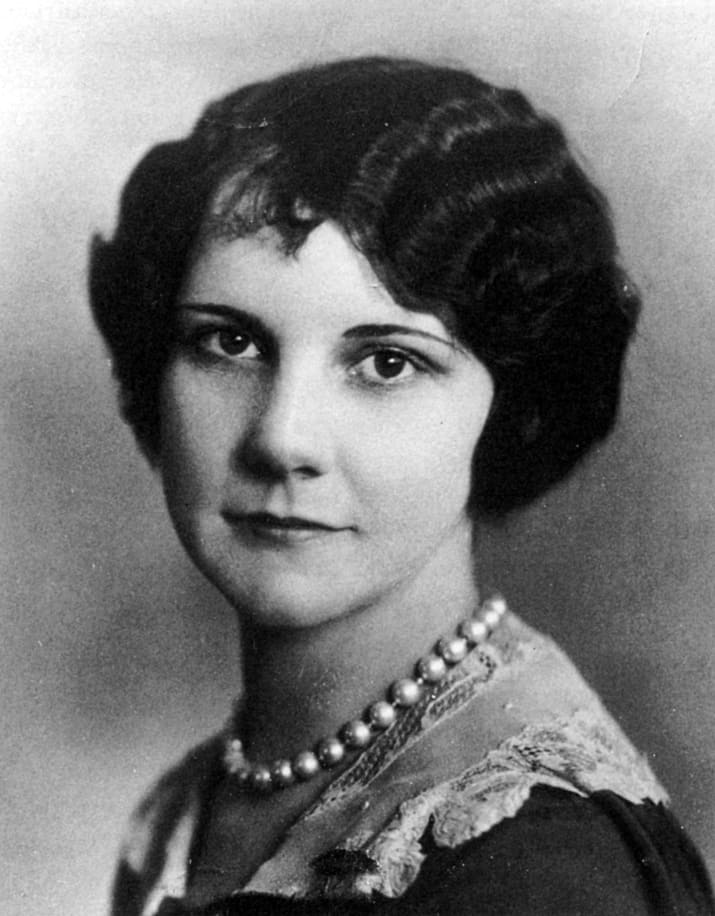
- Born: 14 March 1899; Orange, New Jersey, US
- Died: 27 October 1933 (aged 34); Essex County, New Jersey, US
- Resting place: Restland Memorial Park, East Hanover, Morris County, New Jersey, US
- Occupation(s): Dial painter, bank teller
- Employer: United States Radium Corporation
- Known for: Bringing a lawsuit against the US Radium Corporation

Grace Fryer (14 March 1899 – 27 October 1933) was an American dial painter and Radium Girl, who sued U.S. Radium after suffering radium poisoning while employed painting watch faces. Subsequently, joined by fellow workers Quinta McDonald, Albina Larice, Edna Hussman, and Katherine Schaub, Fryer brought a suit labelled in the media “The Case of the Five Women Doomed to Die”. It was a pivotal case for the labor rights movement and in establishing workers' safety regulations.

== Early life ==
Grace Fryer was born on 14 March 1899 in Orange, New Jersey, one of eleven children born to Daniel Edward Fryer and Grace Moulton Gilbert. Her father was a union representative.

Fryer began working at U.S. Radium in 1917 aged eighteen and left in January 1920, having been offered work as a bank teller. Alongside 70 other women and girls, Fryer worked painting the faces of watches, clocks, and other instruments with a glow-in-the-dark radium solution. To maintain a thin point on the brushes they used, workers were encouraged by fellow peers to "lip-point" them using their lips, which they did regularly as they worked to make painting easier.

== Lawsuit against U.S. Radium ==
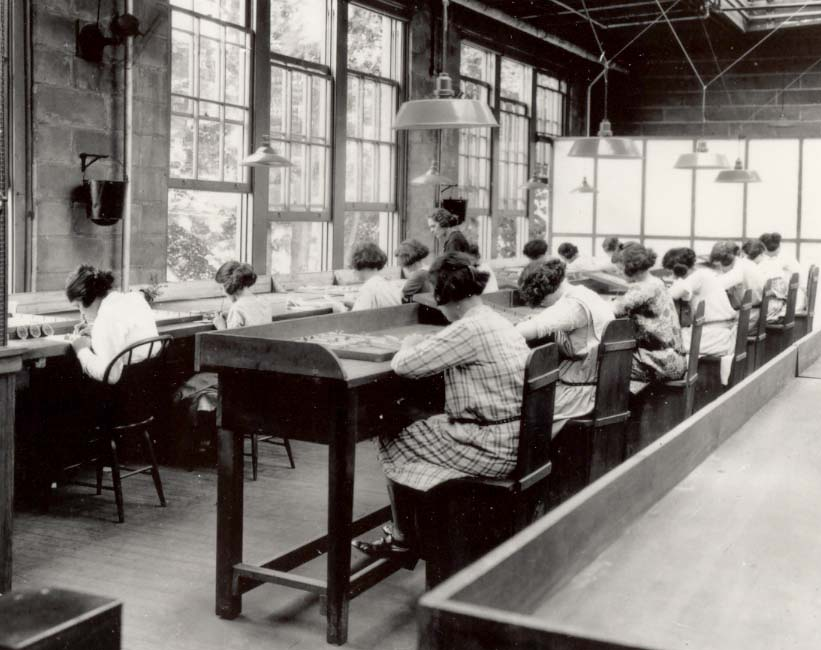
Radium Girls work in a factory of the United States Radium Corporation.

Within two years of leaving U.S. Radium, Fryer began losing her teeth through a painful cycle, further described in "The Radium Girls". Soon afterwards, her jaw became painful and her eyes clouded. A doctor discovered serious bone decay in her mouth, but failed to identify a reason for it. It wasn't until 1925 that a second doctor suggested Fryer's health issues might relate to her previous employment.

Having sought a lawyer willing to take the case for two years, in May 1927, assisted by young attorney Raymond Berry, Fryer filed a lawsuit with the New Jersey Supreme Court. She was subsequently joined by four other dial painters: Quinta McDonald, Albina Larice, Edna Hussman, and Katherine Schaub. McDonald and Larice were sisters of Amelia Maggia, who had been the first known victim of chronic industrial radium poisoning. She had died in 1922.

The situation of the so-called "doomed women" aroused the sympathies, and outrage, of the press. The Woman's Journal wrote in 1928:

Seldom have we had so flagrant an instance of the heartlessness of a great corporation. It proves again that while ninety-nine employers may provide the best of care for those who labor for them, the public must safeguard the weak and helpless who are at the mercy of the hundredth master—not alone by wider education about industrial hazards, but by the most careful and stringent laws.

Fryer has been described as spearheading the "long, arduous fight" for acknowledgement of "the deadly repercussions of using radium", and the demand for compensation for the women affected. The lawsuit was settled out of court in 1928, with U.S. Radium agreeing to pay medical and legal expenses of the 'Radium Girls', as well as paying each of them a $10,000 lump sum and a $600/year annuity.

== Death and legacy ==
Grace Fryer died on 27 October 1933 at the age of 34, of a radium-induced sarcoma in the shoulder. Today, the Horological Society of New York awards The Grace Fryer Scholarship for Female Watchmaking Students, named for Fryer and the Radium Girls.
