= Théodore Sidot =

French chemist

Théodore Sidot was a French chemist who, in 1866, discovered the phosphorescence of zinc sulphide. He worked at the Lycée Charlemagne in Paris, as chemistry preparator. He was injured in the 1870 Franco-Prussian War at the Fort de Nogent. He received the 1883 Prix Trémont of the Académie des Sciences.
