= Radioluminescence =

Light produced in a material by bombardment with ionizing radiation

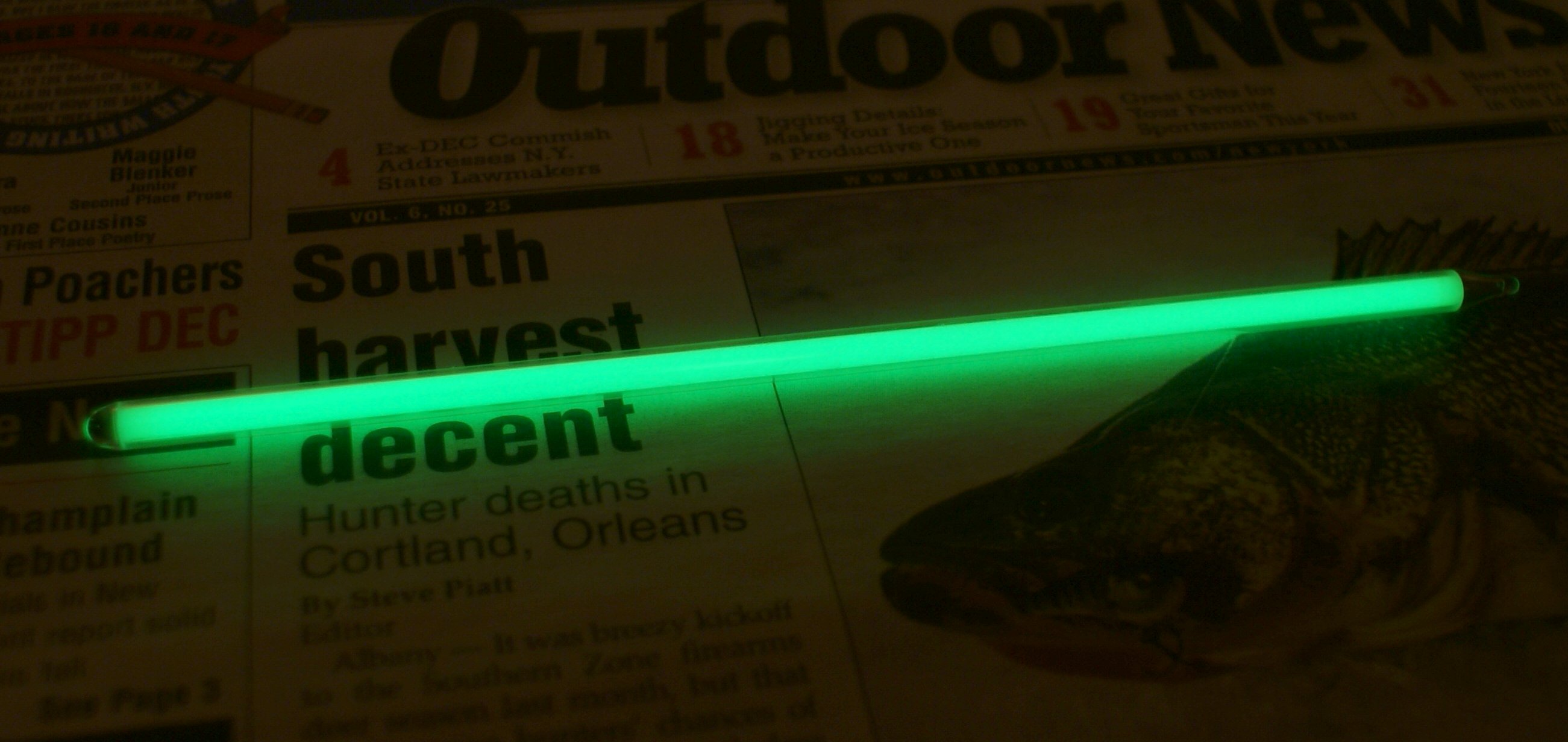
Radioluminescent 1.8-curie (67 GBq) 6-by-0.2-inch (152.4 mm × 5.1 mm) tritium vial used as a light source. It consists of a sealed glass tube containing radioactive tritium gas, whose inner surfaces are coated with a phosphor.

Radioluminescence (or scintillation) is the phenomenon by which light is produced in a material by bombardment with ionizing radiation such as alpha particles, beta particles, or gamma rays. Radioluminescence is used as a low level light source for night illumination of instruments or signage. Radioluminescent paint is occasionally used for clock hands and instrument dials, enabling them to be read in the dark. Radioluminescence is also sometimes seen around high-power radiation sources, such as nuclear reactors and radioisotopes.

== Mechanism ==
Radioluminescence occurs when an incoming particle of ionizing radiation collides with an atom or molecule, exciting an orbital electron to a higher energy level. The particle usually comes from the radioactive decay of an atom of a radioisotope, an isotope of an element which is radioactive. The electron then returns to its ground energy level by emitting the extra energy as a photon of light. A chemical that releases light of a particular color when struck by ionizing radiation is called a phosphor. Radioluminescent light sources usually consist of a radioactive substance mixed with, or in proximity to, a phosphor.

== Applications ==
Since radioactivity was discovered around the beginning of the 20th century, the main application of radioluminescence has been in radioluminescent paint, used on watch and compass dials, gunsights, aircraft flight instrument faces, and other instruments, allowing them to be seen in darkness. Radioluminescent paint consists of a mixture of a chemical containing a radioisotope with a radioluminescent chemical (phosphor). The continuous radioactive decay of the isotope's atoms releases radiation particles which strike the molecules of the phosphor, causing them to emit light. The constant bombardment by radioactive particles causes the chemical breakdown of many types of phosphor, so radioluminescent paints lose some of their luminosity during their working life.

Radioluminescent materials may also be used in the construction of an optoelectric nuclear battery, a type of radioisotope generator in which nuclear energy is converted into light. The radioluminescence of nitrogen in air can be used to detect alpha radiation in nuclear contamination sites.

=== Radium ===
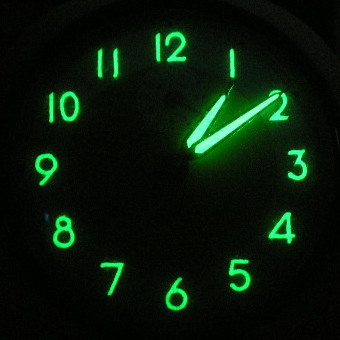
A 1950s radium clock, exposed to ultraviolet light to increase luminescence

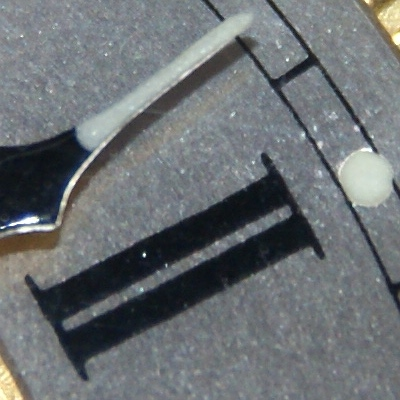
Self-luminous white radium paint on the face and hand of an old clock.

The first use of radioluminescence was in luminous paint containing radium, a natural radioisotope. Beginning in 1908, luminous paint containing a mixture of radium and copper-doped zinc sulfide was used to paint watch faces and instrument dials, giving a greenish glow. Phosphors containing copper-doped zinc sulfide (ZnS:Cu) yield blue-green light; copper and manganese-doped zinc sulfide (ZnS:Cu,Mn), yielding yellow-orange light are also used. Radium-based luminescent paint is no longer used due to the radiation hazard posed to persons manufacturing the dials. These phosphors are not suitable for use in layers thicker than 25 mg/cm^{2}, as the self-absorption of the light then becomes a problem. Zinc sulfide undergoes degradation of its crystal lattice structure, leading to gradual loss of brightness significantly faster than the depletion of radium.

ZnS:Ag coated spinthariscope screens were used by Ernest Rutherford in his experiments discovering the atomic nucleus.

Radium was used in luminous paint until the 1960s, when it was replaced with the other radioisotopes mentioned above due to health concerns. In addition to alpha and beta particles, radium emits penetrating gamma rays, which can pass through the metal and glass of a watch dial, and skin. A typical older radium wristwatch dial has a radioactivity of 3–10 kBq and could expose its wearer to an annual dose of 24 millisieverts if worn continuously. Another health hazard is its decay product, the radioactive gas radon, which constitutes a significant risk even at extremely low concentrations when inhaled. Radium's long half-life of 1600 years means that surfaces coated with radium paint, such as watch faces and hands, remain a health hazard long after their useful life is over. There are still millions of luminous radium clock, watch, and compass faces and aircraft instrument dials owned by the public. The case of the "Radium Girls", workers in watch factories in the early 1920s who painted watch faces with radium paint and later contracted fatal cancer through ingesting radium when they pointed their brushes with their lips, increased public awareness of the hazards of radioluminescent materials, and radioactivity in general.

=== Promethium ===
In the second half of the 20th century, radium was progressively replaced with paint containing promethium-147. Promethium is a low-energy beta-emitter, which, unlike alpha emitters like radium, does not degrade the phosphor lattice, so the luminosity of the material will not degrade so quickly. It also does not emit the penetrating gamma rays which radium does. The half-life of ^{147}Pm is only 2.62 years, so in a decade the radioactivity of a promethium dial will decline to only 1/16 of its original value, making it safer to dispose of, compared to radium with its half-life of 1600 years. This short half-life meant that the luminosity of promethium dials also dropped by half every 2.62 years, giving them a short useful life, which led to promethium's replacement by tritium.

Promethium-based paint was used to illuminate Apollo Lunar Module electrical switch tips and painted on control panels of the Lunar Roving Vehicle.

=== Tritium ===
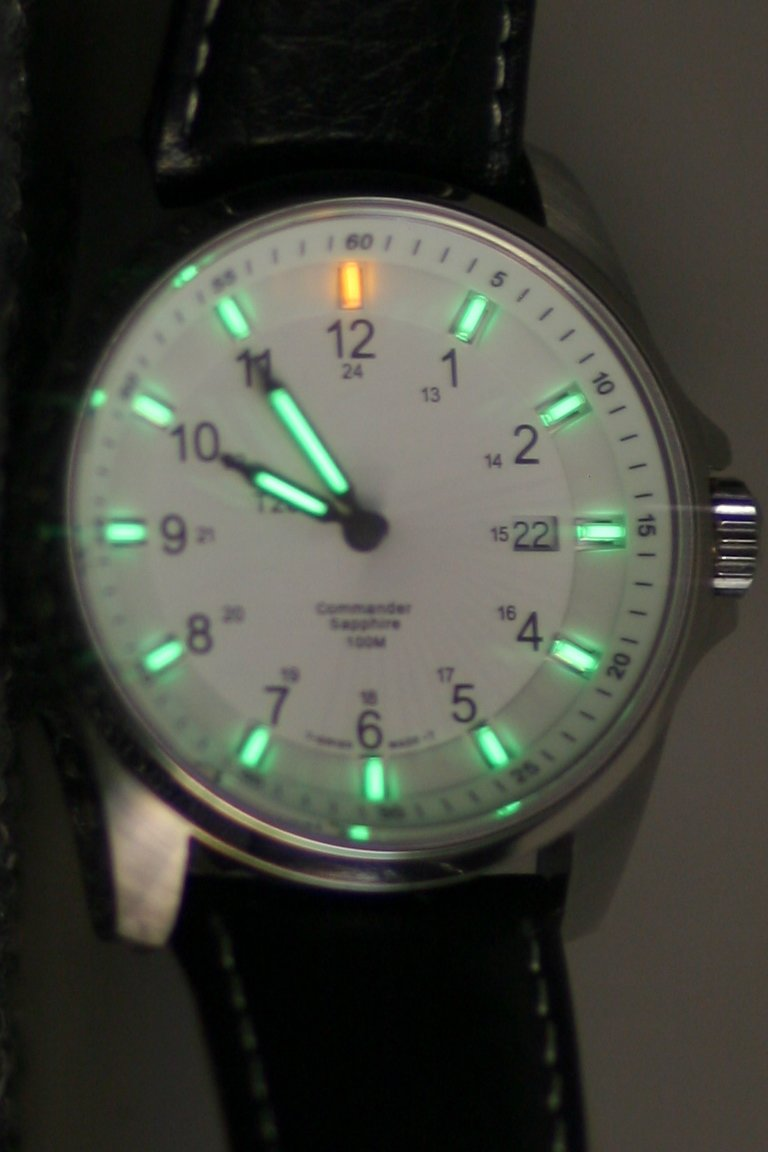
Watch face illuminated by tritium tubes

The latest generation of radioluminescent materials is based on tritium, a radioactive isotope of hydrogen with half-life of 12.32 years that emits very low-energy beta radiation. It is used on wristwatch faces, gun sights, and emergency exit signs. The tritium gas is contained in a small glass tube, coated with a phosphor on the inside. Beta particles emitted by the tritium strike the phosphor coating and cause it to fluoresce, emitting light, usually yellow-green.

Tritium is used because it is believed to pose a negligible threat to human health, in contrast to the previous radioluminescent source, radium, which proved to be a significant radiological hazard. The low-energy 5.7 keV beta particles emitted by tritium cannot pass through the enclosing glass tube. Even if they could, they are not able to penetrate human skin. Tritium is only a health threat if ingested or inhaled. Since tritium is a gas, if a tritium tube breaks, the gas dissipates in the air and is diluted to safe concentrations. Tritium has a half-life of 12.32 years, so the brightness of a tritium light source will decline to half its initial value in that time.

=== Infrared radiofluorescence ===
Infrared radiofluorescence (sometimes spelt radio-fluorescence) is a dating technique involving the infrared (~ 880 nm) luminescence signal of orthoclase from exposure to ionizing radiation. It can reveal the last time of daylight exposure of sediments, e.g., a layer of sand exposed to light before deposition.

== See also ==
- Cherenkov radiation
- Gas mantle
- List of light sources
- Undark
- Radium Dial Company
- United States Radium Corporation
- Radioluminescence in phosphor
