= Standard Chemical Company =

Coordinates: 40°15′22″N 80°11′58″W

- Founded: 1911 to 1922
- Headquarters: Canonsburg, Pennsylvania, United States

Pennsylvania Historical Marker
- Official name: Standard Chemical Company
- Type: City
- Criteria: Business & Industry, Science & Medicine, Professions & Vocations
- Designated: January 01, 2018
- Marker Location: Allen Hall, 3941 O'Hara St., at entrance across from Thackeray Ave., Univ. of Pittsburgh

The Standard Chemical Company (SCC) of Canonsburg, Pennsylvania, was the first successful commercial producer of radium. SCC operated the radium refining mill from 1911 to 1922 on a 19-acre (77,000 m2) plot of land. The company supplied radium to the United States Radium Corporation for use in their watch dials.

== History ==
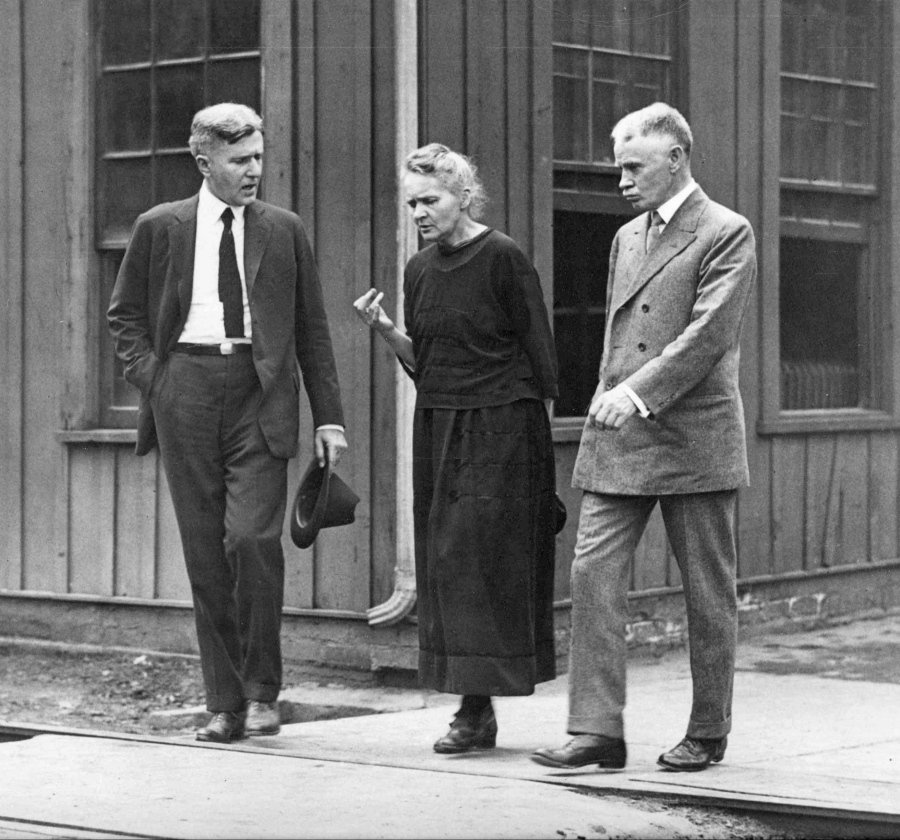
Marie Curie - Standard Chemical Company visit in 1921

The company was established by Joseph M. Flannery (1867-1920) and his brother James J. Flannery (1855-1920). In 1909 their sister became ill with cancer. Joseph, after traveling to Europe and learning that radium could treat cancer, and in an effort to help his sister, he decided that he would refine the radioactive element in the United States.

When Marie Curie was invited to the United States in 27. May 1921, she was given an honorary degree by the University of Pittsburgh, and one gram of radium, which the Standard Chemical Company provided it to her.

== See also ==
United States Radium Corporation
