= Tritium radioluminescence =

Use of gaseous tritium to create visible light

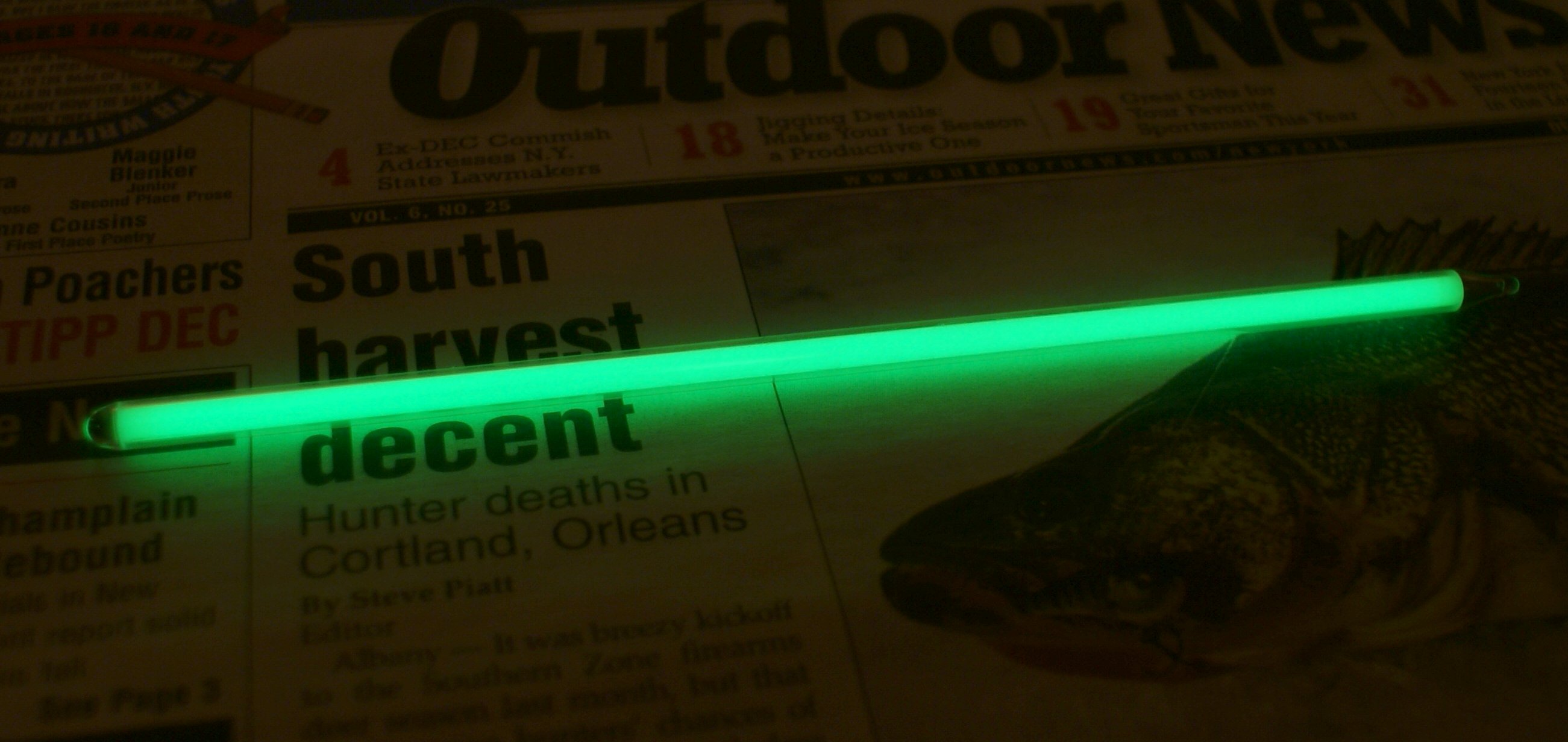
Radioluminescent 1.8-curie (67 GBq) 6-by-0.2-inch (152.4 mm × 5.1 mm) tritium vials are tritium gas-filled, thin glass vials with inner surfaces coated with a phosphor.

Tritium radioluminescence is the use of gaseous tritium, a radioactive isotope of hydrogen, to create visible light. Tritium emits electrons through beta decay and, when they interact with a phosphor material, light is emitted through the process of phosphorescence. The overall process of using a radioactive material to excite a phosphor and ultimately generate light is called radioluminescence. As tritium illumination requires no electrical energy, it has found wide use in applications such as emergency exit signs, illumination of wristwatches, and portable yet reliable sources of low intensity light which will not degrade human night vision. Gun sights for night use and small lights used mostly by military personnel fall under the latter application.

== History ==
Tritium was found to be an ideal energy source for self-luminous compounds in 1953 and the idea was patented by Edward Shapiro on 29 October 1953, in the US (2749251 – Source of Luminosity).

== Design ==
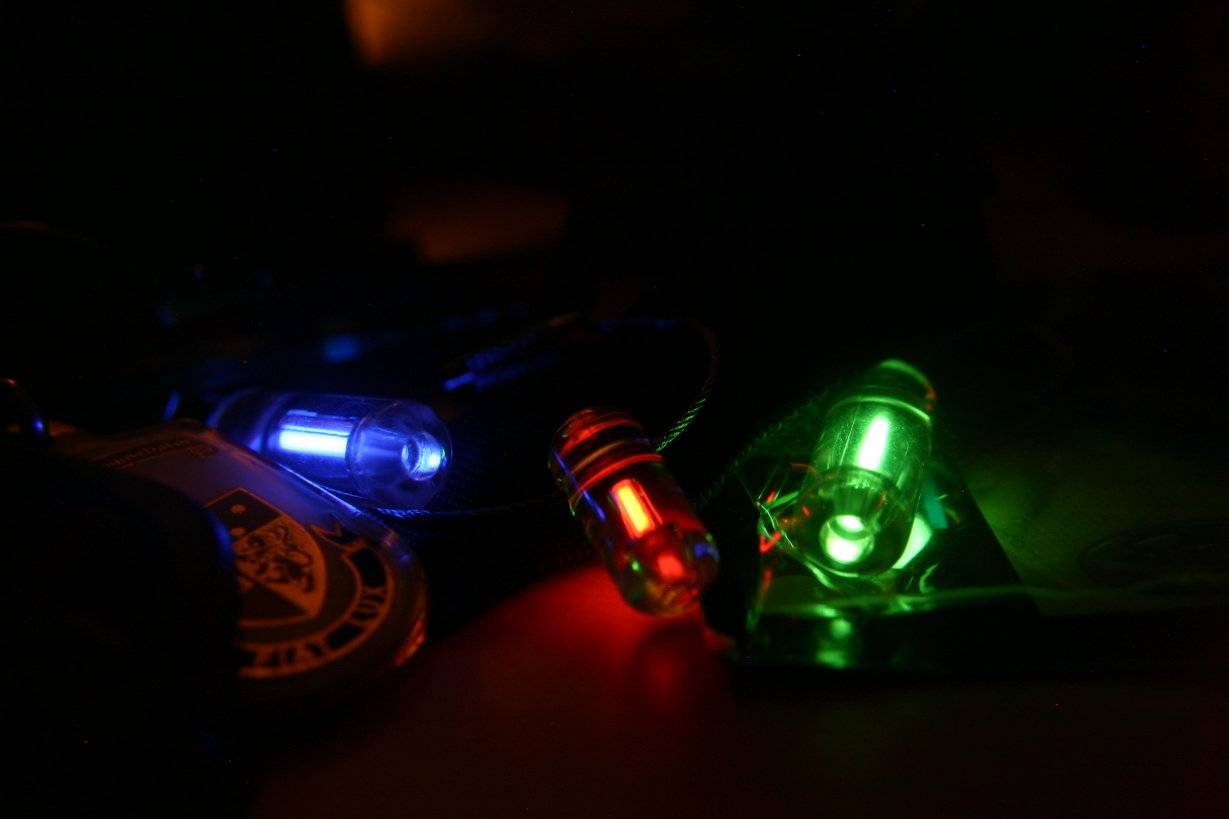
Radioluminescent keychains

Tritium lighting is made using glass tubes with a phosphor layer in them and tritium gas inside the tube. Such a tube is known as a "gaseous tritium light source" (GTLS), or beta light (since the tritium undergoes beta decay), or tritium lamp.

The tritium in a gaseous tritium light source undergoes beta (β) decay, releasing electrons that cause the phosphor layer to phosphoresce.

During manufacture, a length of borosilicate glass tube that has had the internal surface coated with a phosphor-containing material is filled with tritium. The tube is then sealed at the desired length using a carbon dioxide laser. Borosilicate is preferred for its strength and resistance to breakage. In the tube, the tritium gives off a steady stream of electrons due to β decay. These particles excite the phosphor, causing it to emit a low, steady glow.

Tritium is not the only material that can be used for self-powered lighting. Radium was used to make self-luminous paint from the early 20th century to about 1970. Promethium briefly replaced radium as a radiation source. Tritium is the only radiation source used in radioluminescent light sources today due to its low radiological toxicity and commercial availability.

Various preparations of the phosphor compound can be used to produce different colors of light. For example, doping zinc sulfide phosphor with different metals can change the emission wavelength. Some of the colors that have been manufactured in addition to the common phosphors are green, red, blue, yellow, purple, orange, and white.

The GTLSs used in watches give off a small amount of light: Not enough to be seen in daylight, but visible in the dark from a distance of several meters. The average such GTLS has a useful life of 10–20 years. The rate of β emissions decreases by half in each half-life (12.33 years). Also, phosphor degradation will cause the brightness of a tritium tube to drop by more than half in that period. The more tritium is initially placed in the tube, the brighter it is to begin with, and the longer its useful life. Tritium exit signs usually come in three brightness levels guaranteed for 10, 15, or 20-year useful life expectancies. The difference between the signs is how much tritium the manufacturer installs.

The light produced by GTLSs varies in color and size. Green usually appears as the brightest color with a brightness as high as 2 cd/m^{2} and red appears the least bright. For comparison, most consumer desktop liquid crystal displays have luminances of 200 to 300 cd/m^{2}. Sizes range from tiny tubes small enough to fit on the hand of a watch to ones the size of a pencil. Large tubes (5 mm diameter and up to 100 mm long) are usually only found in green, and can surprisingly be not as bright as the standard 22.5 mm × 3 mm sized tritium, this is due to the lower concentration and high cost of tritium; this smaller size is usually the brightest and is used mainly in keychains available commercially.

== Uses ==
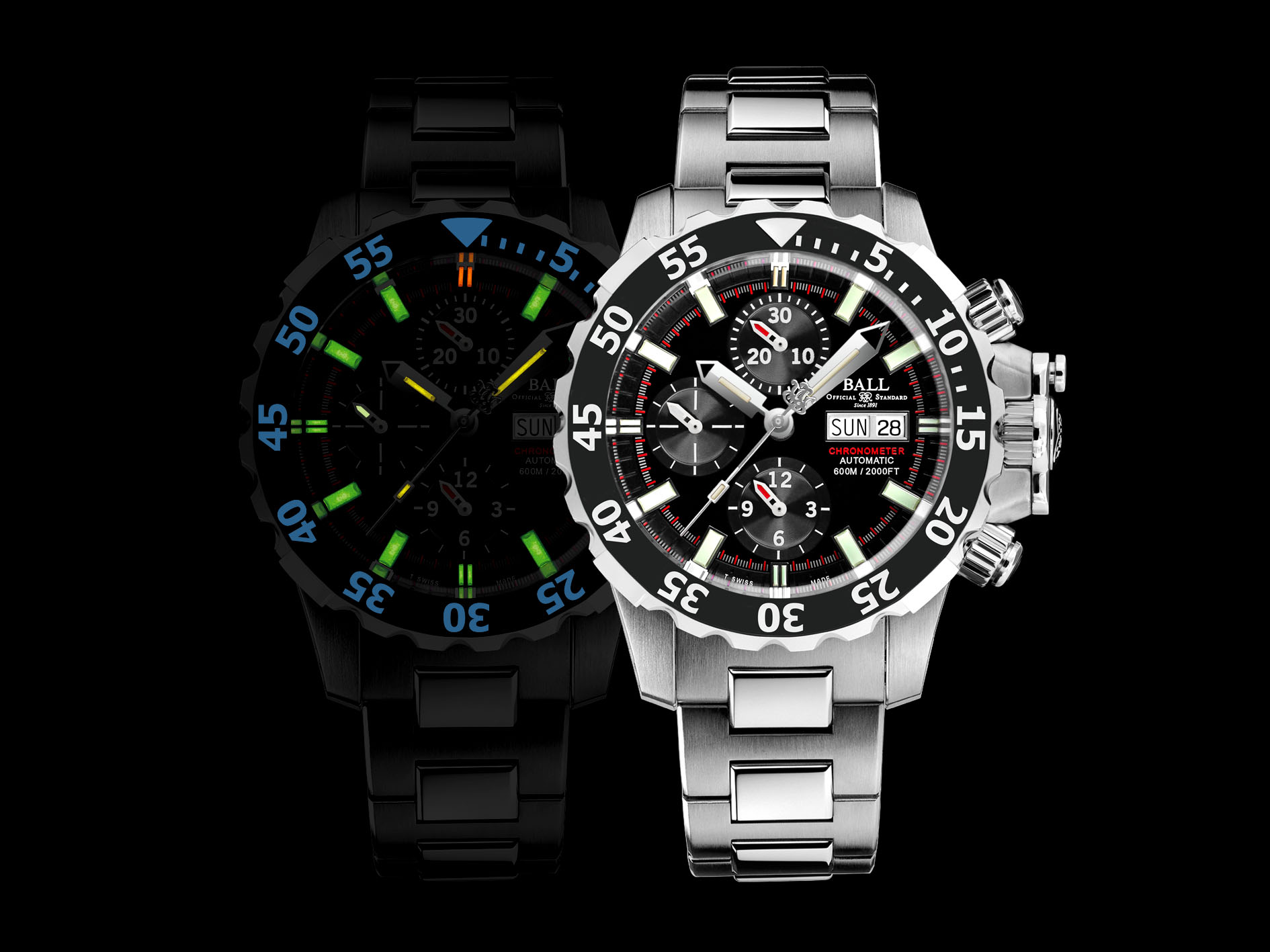
A "permanent" illumination watch dial

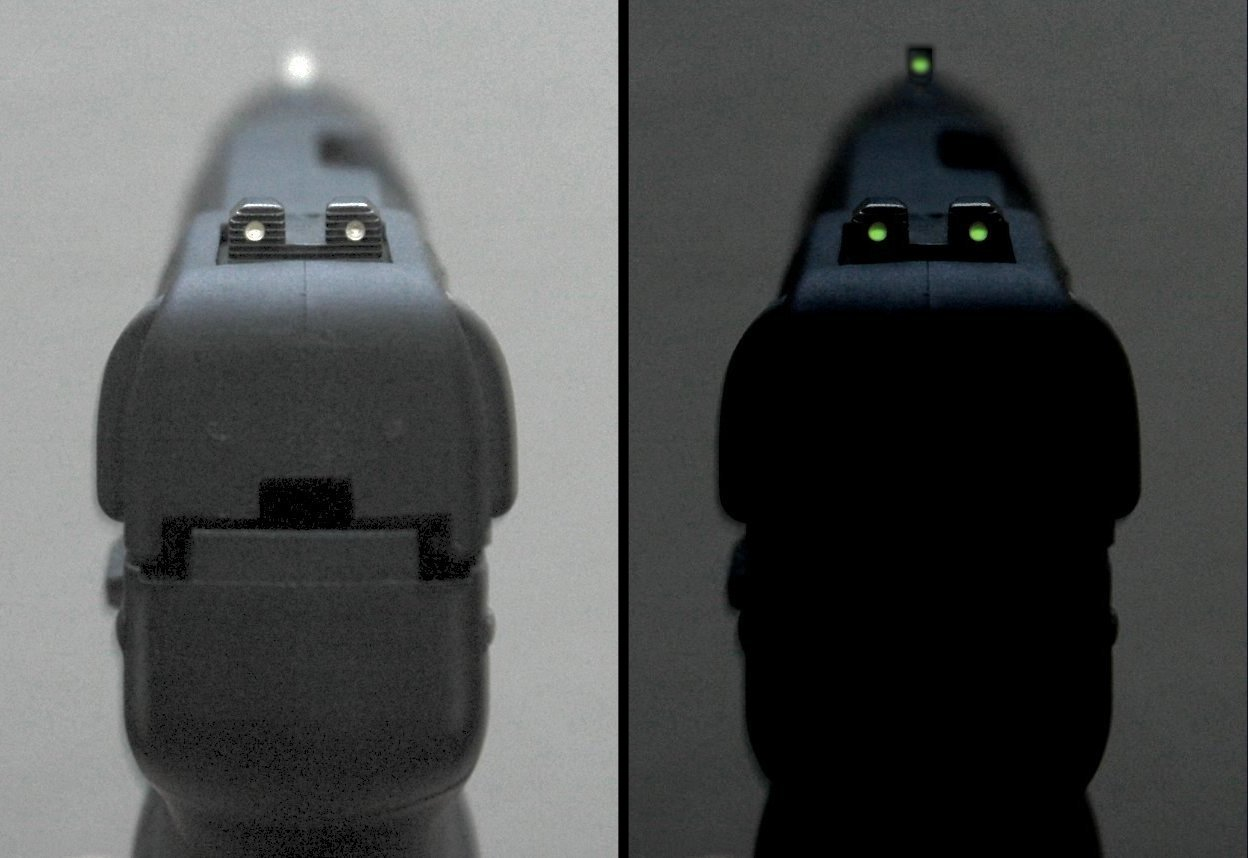
Tritium-illuminated handgun night sights on an FN Five-seven

These light sources are most often seen as "permanent" illumination for the hands of wristwatches intended for diving, nighttime, or combat use. They are also used in glowing novelty keychains and in self-illuminated exit signs. They are favored by the military for applications where a power source may not be available, such as for instrument dials in aircraft, compasses, and sights for weapons. In the case of solid tritium light sources, the tritium replaces some of the hydrogen atoms in the paint, which also contains a phosphor such as zinc sulfide.

Tritium lights or beta lights were formerly used in fishing lures. Some flashlights have slots for tritium vials so that the flashlight can be easily located in the dark.

Tritium is used to illuminate the iron sights of some small arms. The reticle on the SA80's optical SUSAT sight as well as the LPS 4x6° TIP2 telescopic sight of a PSL rifle, contains a small amount of tritium for the same effect as an example of tritium use on a rifle sight. The electrons emitted by the radioactive decay of the tritium cause phosphor to glow, thus providing a long-lasting (several years) and non-battery-powered firearms sight that is visible in dim lighting conditions. The tritium glow is not noticeable in bright conditions such as during daylight, however; consequently some manufacturers have started to integrate fiber optic sights with tritium vials to provide bright, high-contrast firearms sights in both bright and dim conditions.

In addition to its widespread use in watch dials and weapon sights, tritium has also found niche applications in the jewelry industry. Its self-illuminating properties allow it to glow continuously for years without requiring an external power source, making it suitable for glow-in-the-dark rings and other accessories. These pieces are especially favored in contexts where both aesthetics and low-light visibility are desired.

== Safety ==
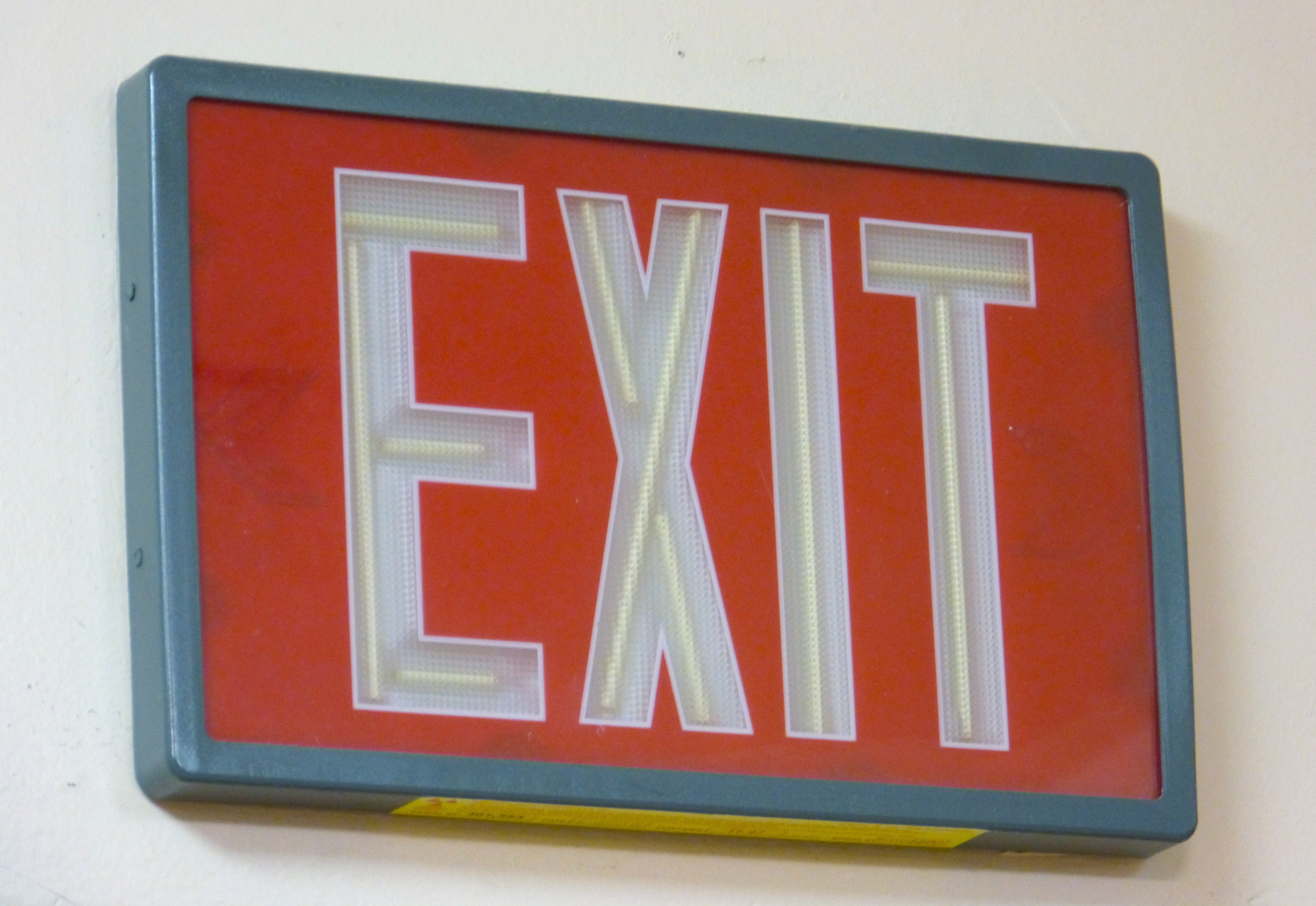
A self-luminous exit sign that contains tubes of tritium

Though these devices contain a radioactive substance, it is currently believed that self-powered lighting does not pose a significant health concern. A 2007 report by the UK government's Health Protection Agency Advisory Group on Ionizing Radiation declared the health risks of tritium exposure to be double that previously set by the International Commission on Radiological Protection, but encapsulated tritium lighting devices, typically taking the form of a luminous glass tube embedded in a thick block of clear plastic, prevent the user from being exposed to the tritium at all unless the device is broken apart.

Tritium presents no external beta radiation threat when encapsulated in non-hydrogen-permeable containers due to its low penetration depth, which is too short to penetrate intact human skin. However, GTLS devices do emit low levels of X-rays due to bremsstrahlung. According to a report by the OECD, any external radiation from a gaseous tritium light device is solely due to bremsstrahlung, usually in the range of 8–14 keV. The bremsstrahlung dose rate cannot be calculated from the properties of tritium alone, as the dose rate and effective energy is dependent on the form of containment. A bare, cylindrical vial GTLS constructed of 0.1 mm thick glass that is 10 mm long and 0.5 mm in diameter will yield a surface dose rate of 100 millirads per hour per curie. If the same vial were instead constructed of 1 mm thick glass and enclosed in a plastic covering that is 2–3 mm thick, the GTLS will yield a surface dose rate of 1 millirad per hour per curie. The dose rate measured from 10 mm away will be two orders of magnitude lower than the measured surface dose rate. Given that the half-value thickness of 10 keV photon radiation in water is about 1.4 mm, the attenuation provided by tissue overlaying blood-forming organs is considerable.

The primary danger from tritium arises if it is inhaled, ingested, injected, or absorbed into the body. This results in the absorption of the emitted radiation in a small region of the body, again due to the low penetration depth. The biological half-life of tritium – the time it takes for half of an ingested dose to be expelled from the body – is low, at only 12 days. Tritium excretion can be accelerated further by increasing water intake to 3–4 liters/day. Direct, short-term exposure to small amounts of tritium is mostly harmless. If a tritium tube breaks, one should leave the area and allow the gas to diffuse into the air. Tritium exists naturally in the environment, but in very small quantities.

== Legislation ==
Products containing tritium are controlled by law because tritium is used in boosted fission weapons and thermonuclear weapons (though in quantities several thousand times larger than that in a keychain). In the US, devices such as self-luminous exit signs, gauges, wristwatches, etc. that contain small amounts of tritium are under the jurisdiction of the Nuclear Regulatory Commission, and are subject to possession, distribution, and import and export regulations found in 10 CFR Parts, 30, 32, and 110. They are also subject to regulations for possession, use, and disposal in certain states. Luminous products containing more tritium than needed for a wristwatch are not widely available at retail outlets in the United States.

Tritium products are readily sold and used in the UK and US. They are regulated in England and Wales by environmental health departments of local councils. In Australia products containing tritium are licence exempt if they contain less than 1×10^{6} becquerels per gram (2.7×10^{−5} Ci/g) tritium and have a total activity of less than 1×10^{9} becquerels (0.027 Ci), except for in safety devices where the limit is 74×10^{9} becquerels (2.0 Ci) total activity.

== See also ==
- List of light sources
- Radium Girls
