= Zinc sulfide =

Inorganic compound

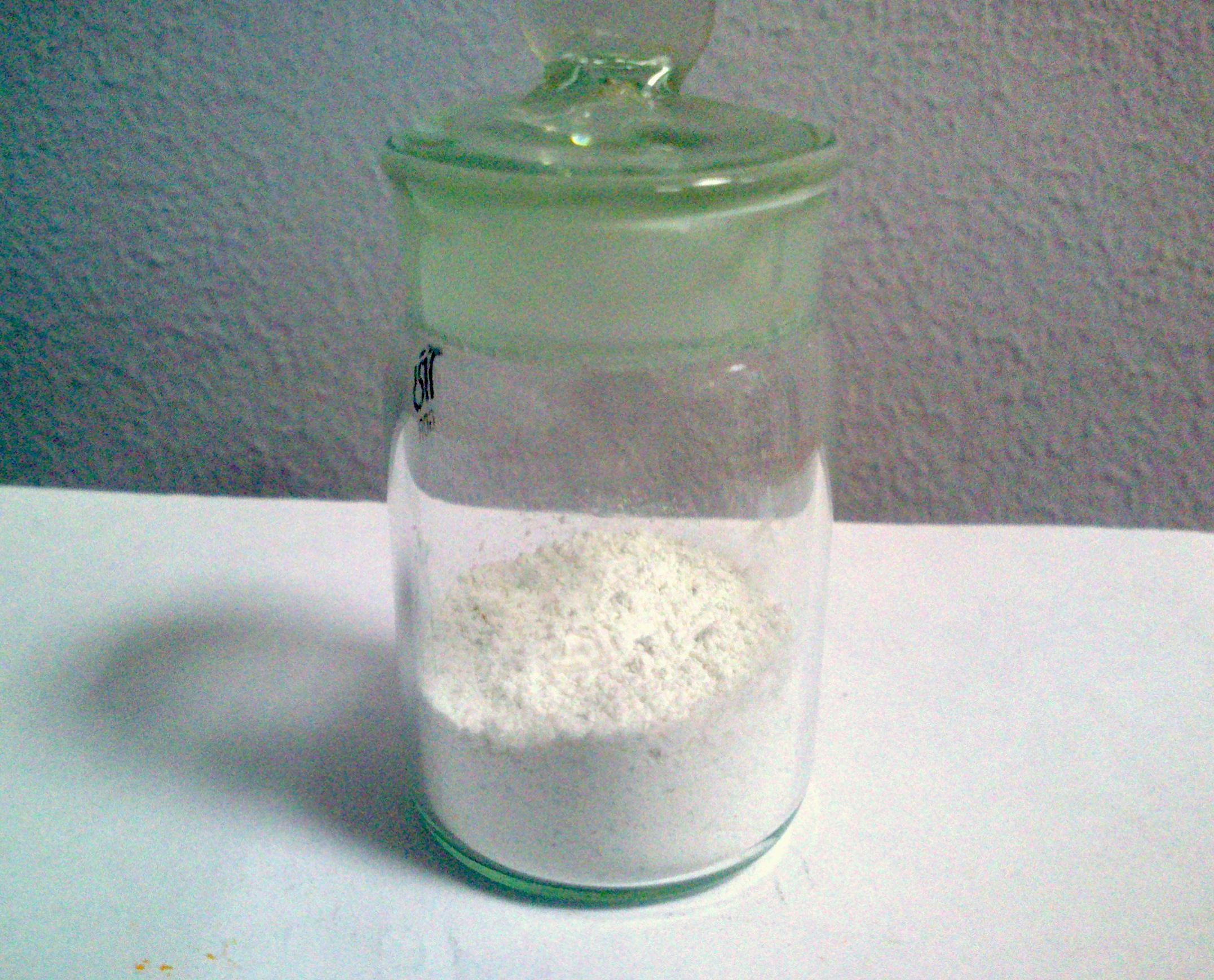
- A transparent jar with white zinc sulfide powder

Names
- Other names Zincblende; Wurtzite

Identifiers
CAS Number	1314-98-3
3D model (JSmol)	Interactive image
ChemSpider	8009652
ECHA InfoCard	100.013.866
EC Number	215-251-3
PubChem CID	14821
RTECS number	ZH5400000
UNII	KPS085631O
CompTox Dashboard (EPA)	DTXSID101318257 DTXSID7042518, DTXSID101318257
- InChI: InChI=1S/S.Zn/q-2;+2 Key: DRDVZXDWVBGGMH-UHFFFAOYSA-N
- SMILES: [Zn+2].[S-2]

Properties
Chemical formula	ZnS
Molar mass	97.474 g/mol
Density	4.090 g/cm^{3}
Melting point	1,850 °C (3,360 °F; 2,120 K) (sublime)
Solubility in water	negligible
Band gap	3.54 eV (cubic, 300 K); 3.91 eV (hexagonal, 300 K)
Refractive index (n_{D})	2.3677

Structure
Crystal structure	see text
Coordination geometry	Tetrahedral (Zn^{2+}); Tetrahedral (S^{2−})

Thermochemistry
Std enthalpy of formation (Δ_{f}H^{⦵}_{298})	−204.6 kJ/mol

Hazards
NFPA 704 (fire diamond)	1 0 0
Flash point	Nonflammable
Safety data sheet (SDS)	ICSC 1627

Related compounds
Other anions	Zinc oxide Zinc selenide Zinc telluride
Other cations	Cadmium sulfide Mercury sulfide
- Except where otherwise noted, data are given for materials in their standard state (at 25 °C [77 °F], 100 kPa). verify (what is ?) Infobox references

Zinc sulfide is an inorganic compound with the chemical formula of ZnS. This is the main form of zinc found in nature, where it mainly occurs as the mineral sphalerite. Although this mineral is usually black because of various impurities, the pure material is white, and it is widely used as a pigment. In its dense synthetic form, zinc sulfide can be transparent, and it is used as a window for visible optics and infrared optics.

== Structure ==
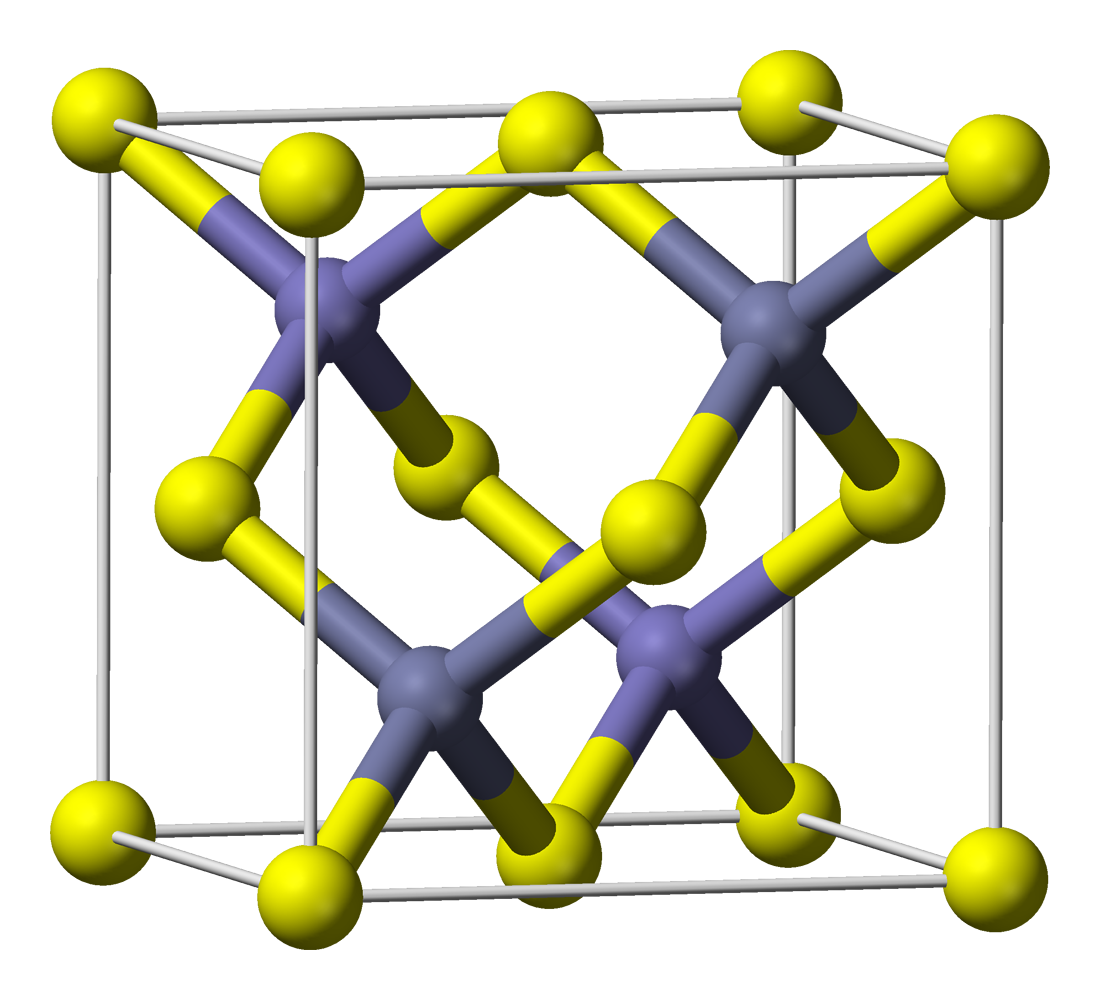
Sphalerite, the more common polymorph of zinc sulfide

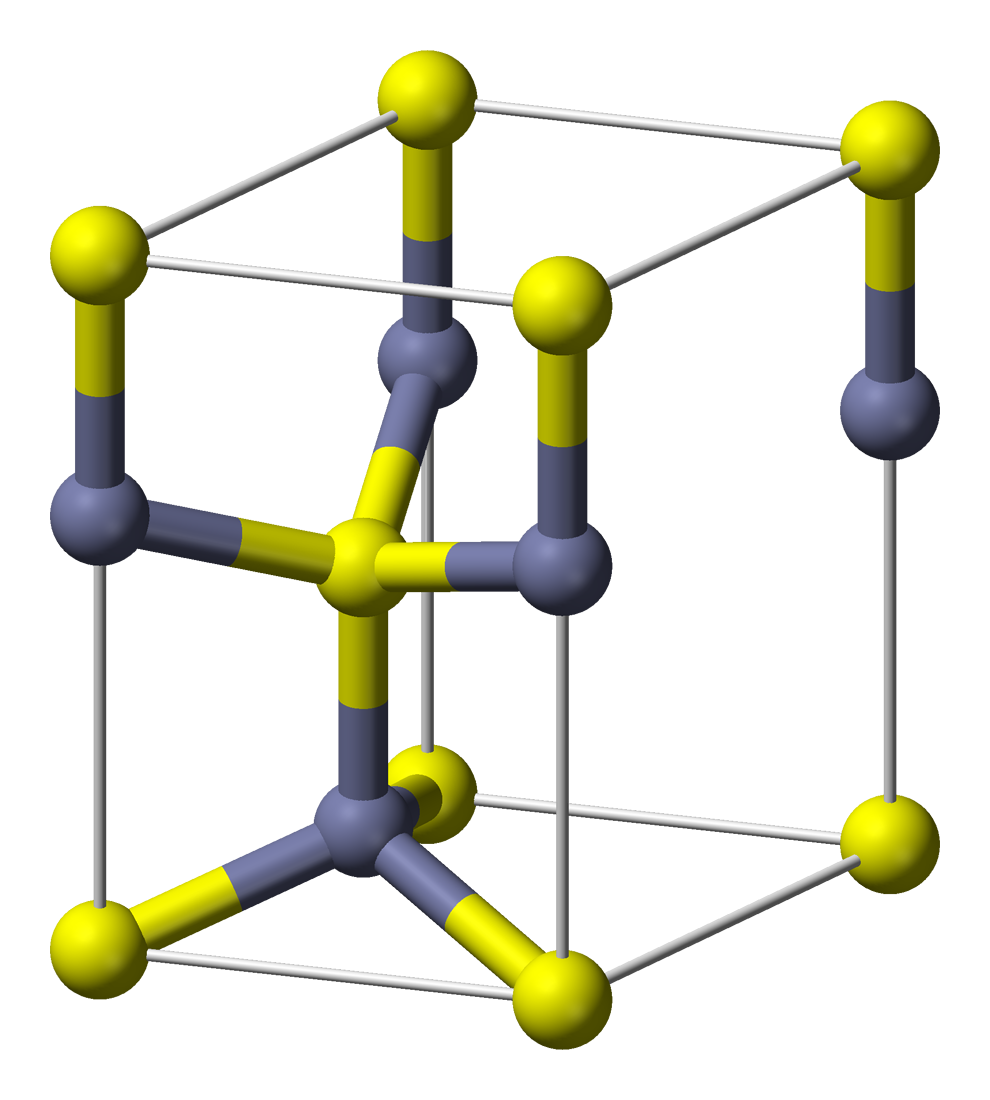
Wurtzite, the less common polymorph of zinc sulfide

ZnS exists in two main crystalline forms. This dualism is an example of polymorphism. In each form, the coordination geometry at Zn and S is tetrahedral. The more stable cubic form is known also as zinc blende or sphalerite. The hexagonal form is known as the mineral wurtzite, although it also can be produced synthetically. The transition from the sphalerite form to the wurtzite form occurs at around 1020 °C.

== Applications ==
=== Luminescent material ===
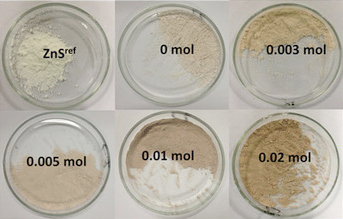
samples of zinc sulfide with varying sulfur vacancies.

Zinc sulfide, with addition of a few ppm of a suitable activator, exhibits strong phosphorescence. The phenomenon was described by Nikola Tesla in 1893, and is currently used in many applications, from cathode-ray tubes through X-ray screens to glow in the dark products. When silver is used as activator, the resulting color is bright blue, with maximum at 450 nanometers. Using manganese yields an orange-red color at around 590 nanometers. Copper gives a longer glow, and it has the familiar greenish glow-in-the-dark. Copper-doped zinc sulfide ("ZnS plus Cu") is used also in electroluminescent panels. It also exhibits phosphorescence due to impurities on illumination with blue or ultraviolet light.

=== Optical material ===
Zinc sulfide is also used as an infrared optical material, transmitting from visible wavelengths to just over 12 micrometers. It can be used planar as an optical window or shaped into a lens. It is made as microcrystalline sheets by the synthesis from hydrogen sulfide gas and zinc vapour, and this is sold as FLIR-grade (forward looking infrared), where the zinc sulfide is in a milky-yellow, opaque form. This material when hot isostatically pressed (HIPed) can be converted to a water-clear form known as Cleartran (trademark). Early commercial forms were marketed as Irtran-2 but this designation is now obsolete.

=== Pigment ===
Zinc sulfide is a common pigment, sometimes called sachtolith. When combined with barium sulfate, zinc sulfide forms lithopone.

=== Catalyst ===
Fine ZnS powder is an efficient photocatalyst, which produces hydrogen gas from water upon illumination. Sulfur vacancies can be introduced in ZnS during its synthesis; this gradually turns the white-yellowish ZnS into a brown powder, and boosts the photocatalytic activity through enhanced light absorption.

=== Semiconductor properties ===
Both sphalerite and wurtzite are intrinsic, wide-bandgap semiconductors. These are prototypical II-VI semiconductors, and they adopt structures related to many of the other semiconductors, such as gallium arsenide. The cubic form of ZnS has a band gap of about 3.54 electron volts at 300 kelvins, but the hexagonal form has a band gap of about 3.91 electron volts. ZnS can be doped as either an n-type semiconductor or a p-type semiconductor.

== History ==
The phosphorescence of ZnS was first reported by the French chemist Théodore Sidot in 1866. His findings were presented by A. E. Becquerel, who was renowned for the research on luminescence. ZnS was used by Ernest Rutherford and others in the early years of nuclear physics as a scintillation detector, because it emits light upon excitation by x-rays or electron beam, making it useful for X-ray screens and cathode-ray tubes. This property made zinc sulfide useful in the dials of radium watches.

== Production ==
Zinc sulfide is usually produced from waste materials from other applications. Typical sources include smelter, slag, and pickle liquors. As an example, the synthesis of ammonia from methane requires a priori removal of hydrogen sulfide impurities in the natural gas, for which zinc oxide is used. This scavenging produces zinc sulfide:

ZnO + H_{2}S → ZnS + H_{2}O

=== Laboratory preparation ===
Crude zinc sulfide can be produced by igniting a mixture of zinc and sulfur. More conventionally, ZnS is prepared by treating a mildly acidic solution of Zn^{2+} salts with H_{2}S:

Zn^{2+} + S^{2−} → ZnS

This reaction is the basis of a gravimetric analysis for zinc.
