= Radium girl =

Radium girl may refer to:

- The Radium Girls, female workers who painted glowing radium watch dials in the 1920s and suffered from radium jaw and death
- The Radium Girls: The Dark Story of America's Shining Women, a 2016 book about the factory workers
- Radium Girls (film), a 2018 film about the factory workers
- Radium Girl, a stage magic illusion

== See also ==
- The Radium Woman, a biography book about Marie Curie, the discoverer of radium
- Radium (disambiguation)
