= Cecil Kent Drinker =

American occupational hygiene expert (1887–1956)

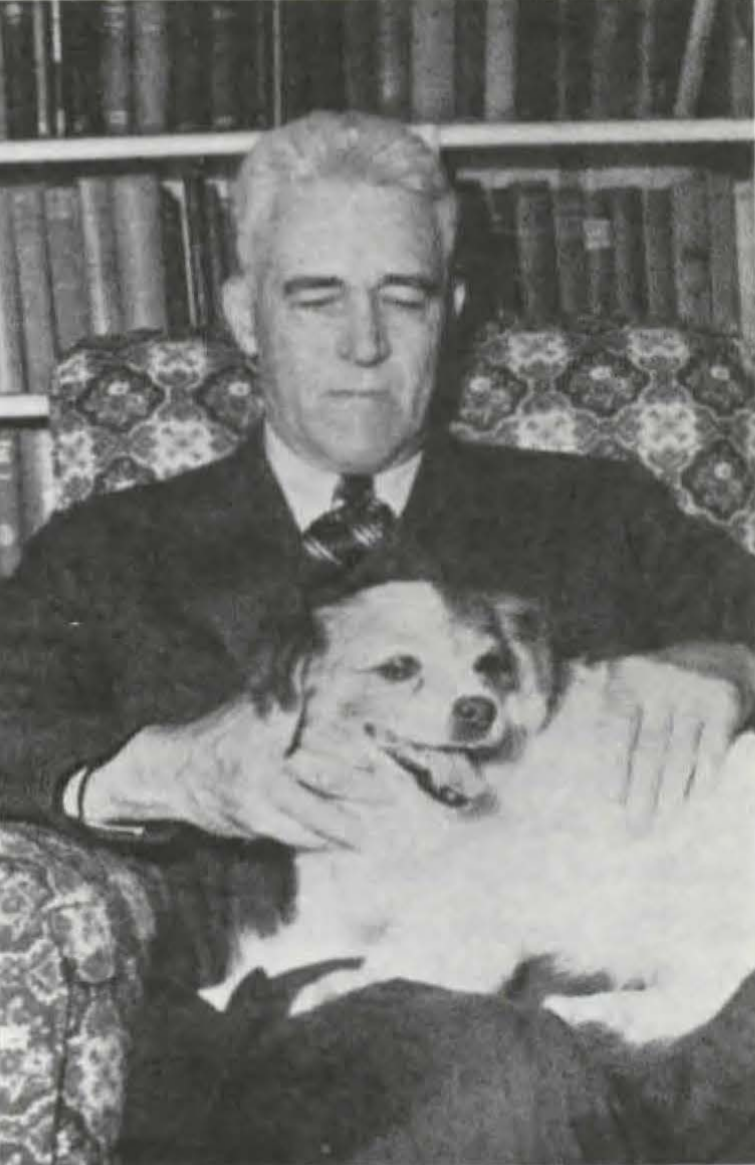
- Drinker in the 1940s
- Born: February 17, 1887; Philadelphia, Pennsylvania, U.S.
- Died: April 15, 1956 (aged 69); Falmouth, Massachusetts, U.S.
- Resting place: West Laurel Hill Cemetery, Bala Cynwyd, Pennsylvania, U.S.
- Education: Haverford College; University of Pennsylvania School of Medicine
- Spouse: Katherine Rotan Drinker
- Relatives: Henry Sturgis Drinker (father); Catherine Drinker Bowen (sister); Henry Drinker (brother); Philip Drinker (brother)
- Medical career
- Profession: Physician, physiologist, professor
- Institutions: Johns Hopkins School of Medicine; Harvard Medical School; Harvard School of Public Health; Cornell Medical School

Cecil Kent Drinker (March 17, 1887 – April 15, 1956) was an American physiologist, educator, and occupational hygiene expert. He was a professor at the Harvard School of Public Health from 1923 to 1935, and served as Dean from 1935 to 1942.

Along with his wife, Katherine Rotan Drinker, he co-edited the Journal of Industrial Hygiene and conducted research on the impact of industrial contamination on worker safety. He differed from other occupational hygienists in that he conducted laboratory experiments rather than direct examination of the workplace and workers. His studies on the impact of polychlorinated biphenyl exposure at the Halowax Corporation and the Radium Girls at the United States Radium Corporation advanced the field of occupational hygiene and improved worker health.

== Early life and education ==
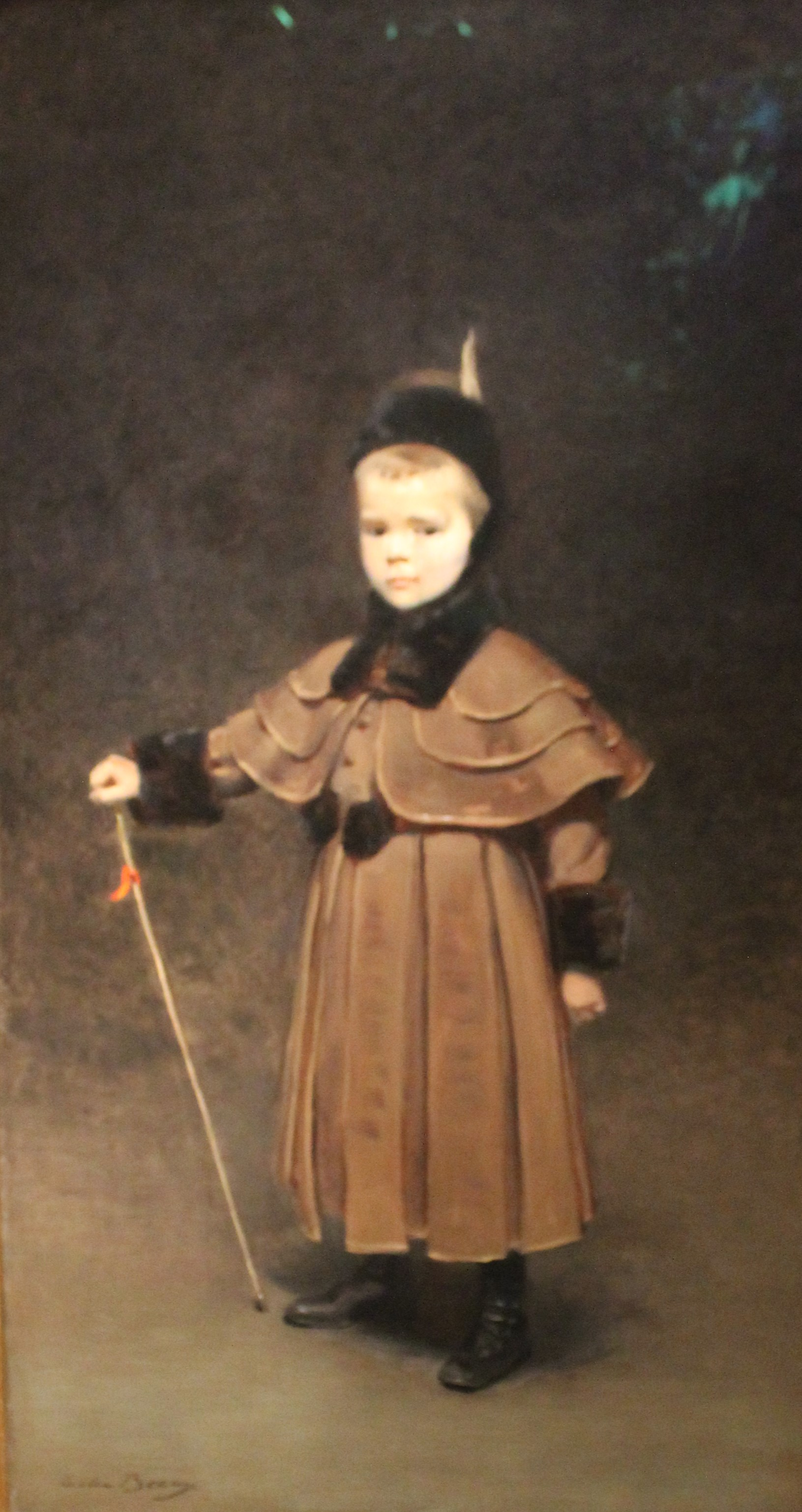
Portrait of Cecil Kent Drinker as a child by Cecilia Beaux

Drinker was born March 17, 1887, in Philadelphia to Henry Sturgis Drinker and Aimee Ernesta Beaux. He was from a wealthy Philadelphia Quaker family and his father was the president of Lehigh University. Cecil graduated from Haverford College with a B.S. degree in 1908 and the University of Pennsylvania Medical School with an M.D. degree in 1913. He did his residency at the Peter Bent Brigham Hospital in Boston.

== Career ==
From 1915 to 1916, he worked at Johns Hopkins Medical School as an instructor in the department of physiology. In 1917, he joined the Harvard Medical School and served as the acting head of the physiology department. He became a full professor of physiology in the school of public health in 1919, assistant dean in 1924, and dean from 1935 to 1942. As the first full-time dean of the school of public health, he increased enrollment and the criteria for admission. He was the first dean to admit women into the school of public health as degree candidates.

He was an expert on the lymphatic system and blood circulation. His mentor was Walter Bradford Cannon and he influenced Drinker's research. While other occupational hygiene researchers focused on direct examination of the workplace and workers, Drinker conducted controlled laboratory tests of chemical exposure using animals and dissection and analysis of tissues.

He was a medical consultant to several companies. He determined that the inhalation of manganese dust and fumes by steel mill workers was harmful. He became an expert in the treatment of manganese poisoning in the United States.

Drinker was hired by the Halowax Corporation to study the impact of polychlorinated biphenyl on employee health. His analyses showed that polychlorinated biphenyl was harmful to humans through ingestion, respiration, and skin contact even in extremely small amounts. He showed that polychlorinated biphenyl damaged the liver and presented these findings to Halowax and representatives from General Electric, the Monsanto Chemical Company, and the United States Public Health Service.

=== Radium girls ===
In the early 1920s, the United States Radium Corporation contacted Drinker and his wife Katherine Rotan Drinker to examine the Orange, New Jersey, factory to determine why several employees had fallen ill. They discovered an environment saturated with radium contaminated dust, with no protection for workers from the radioactive material. The workers used radium-infused paint for clock faces that would glow in the dark. The workers were told it was safe to use the paint and encouraged to lick the radium paint brushes in order to create a fine point. The workers suffered radiation poisoning including a painful condition known as radium jaw. These workers who suffered from industrial poisoning became known as the Radium Girls.

Drinker was convinced that the employee's continuous exposure to radium was causing health problems. The company president, Arthur Roeder, disagreed and blamed the health problems on an infection outside of the factory. Roeder threatened to sue when he found out that Drinker planned to publish their findings and Drinker acquiesced. A Harvard School of Public Health colleague, Alice Hamilton, learned that the United States Radium Corporation had submitted a forged version of Drinker's report to the New Jersey Department of Labor with the results altered to show the company in a better light. With this evidence that Roeder had acted in bad faith, Drinker ignored the threat of lawsuit and published his unaltered report.

After receiving the full report from the Drinkers, the New Jersey labor commissioner declared that all the recommended safety measures be put in place, which prompted the factory to close. After the workers sued the company, major industry safety improvements were put in place and radium-based paint was later banned in the 1960s.

Drinker published over 250 scientific articles and co-edited the Journal of Industrial Hygiene with his wife. In 1925, he was one of only two physiologists that challenged the United States Bureau of Mines and their determination that gasoline containing tetraethyllead was not harmful.

From 1926 to 1927, he was on sabbatical and traveled to the University of Copenhagen to conduct research with August Krogh at the Laboratory of Zoophysiology on the lymphatic system.

During World War II, he conducted research for the United States Armed Forces' National Defense Research Committee which resulted in the development of high-altitude oxygen masks and goggles for pilots.

Drinker suffered from alcoholism and lost his leadership position at Harvard in 1942. He retired in 1948 and lectured at Cornell Medical School from 1948 to 1949. He served as a consultant on physiology to the United States Navy for three years.

Drinker died April 15, 1956, in Falmouth, Massachusetts. He was interred at West Laurel Hill Cemetery in Bala Cynwyd, Pennsylvania.

== Personal life ==
Drinker married Katherine Rotan Drinker, in 1910, and together they had two children.

== Publications ==
- Carbon Monoxide Asphyxia, Oxford University Press, 1938
- The Clinical Physiology of the Lungs, C.C. Thomas, 1954
