= List of presidents of Lehigh University =

Lehigh University is an American private research university located in Bethlehem, Pennsylvania. It was established in 1865 by businessman Asa Packer with a founding gift of $500,000. The President's Office is in the Alumni Memorial Building which is located on the west side of the Asa Packer Campus in South Side Bethlehem. The President's House is situated just a few meters to the southeast of the Alumni Memorial Building.

#	President	Image	Birth–Death	Tenure	Notes	References
1	Henry Coppée		1821–1895	1866–1875	Soldier, author, and engineer.	
2	John McDowell Leavitt		1824–1909	1875–1880	Episcopal clergyman.	
3	Robert Alexander Lamberton		1824–1893	1880–1893	Lawyer.	
4	Thomas Messinger Drown		1842–1904	1895–1904	Chemistry professor.	
5	Henry Sturgis Drinker		1850–1937	1905–1920	Mechanical engineer and first alumnus (Class of 1871) to serve as president.	
6	Charles Russ Richards		1871–1941	1922–1935	Presided over first graduate degrees awarded to women.	
7	Clement C. Williams		1882–1947	1935–1944	Civil engineer.	
8	Martin D. Whitaker		1902–1960	1946–1960	Physicist; Worked on the Manhattan Project.	
9	Harvey A. Neville		1898–1983	1961–1964	Only faculty member ever elected president.	
10	W. Deming Lewis		1915–1989	1964–1982	Presided over admission of undergraduate women.	
11	Peter Likins		b. 1936	1982–1997	Civil engineer.	
–	William C. Hittinger		1922–2013	1997–1998	Class of 1944; electrical engineer, served on an interim basis.	
12	Gregory C. Farrington		b. 1947	1998–2006	Chemist.	
13	Alice P. Gast		1958–2025	2006–2014	Lehigh's first female president, chemical engineer.	
–	Kevin Clayton			2014–2015	Class of 1984; Principal & Director of Oaktree Capital Management, served on an interim basis.	
14	John D. Simon			2015–2021	Chemist.	
–	Nathan Urban			2021	University's provost and senior vice president for academic affairs; served on an interim basis from July 1 to August 15.	
15	Joseph J. Helble			2021–	Chemical engineer. Previously provost of Dartmouth College. Second alumnus (Class of 1982) to serve as president. Term began August 16.	
