= Rotan =

Rotan may refer to:

- Rotan, Texas, a city in Texas
- Rotan, the Malay word for rattan

== Surname ==
- Alexandra Rotan (born 1996), Norwegian singer
- Kate Rotan (1851–1931), American activist
- Katherine Rotan Drinker (1888-1956), American physician, educator, and occupational hygiene expert
- Ruslan Rotan, a professional Ukrainian footballer
