= Henry Sturgis Drinker =

American academic administrator (1850–1937)

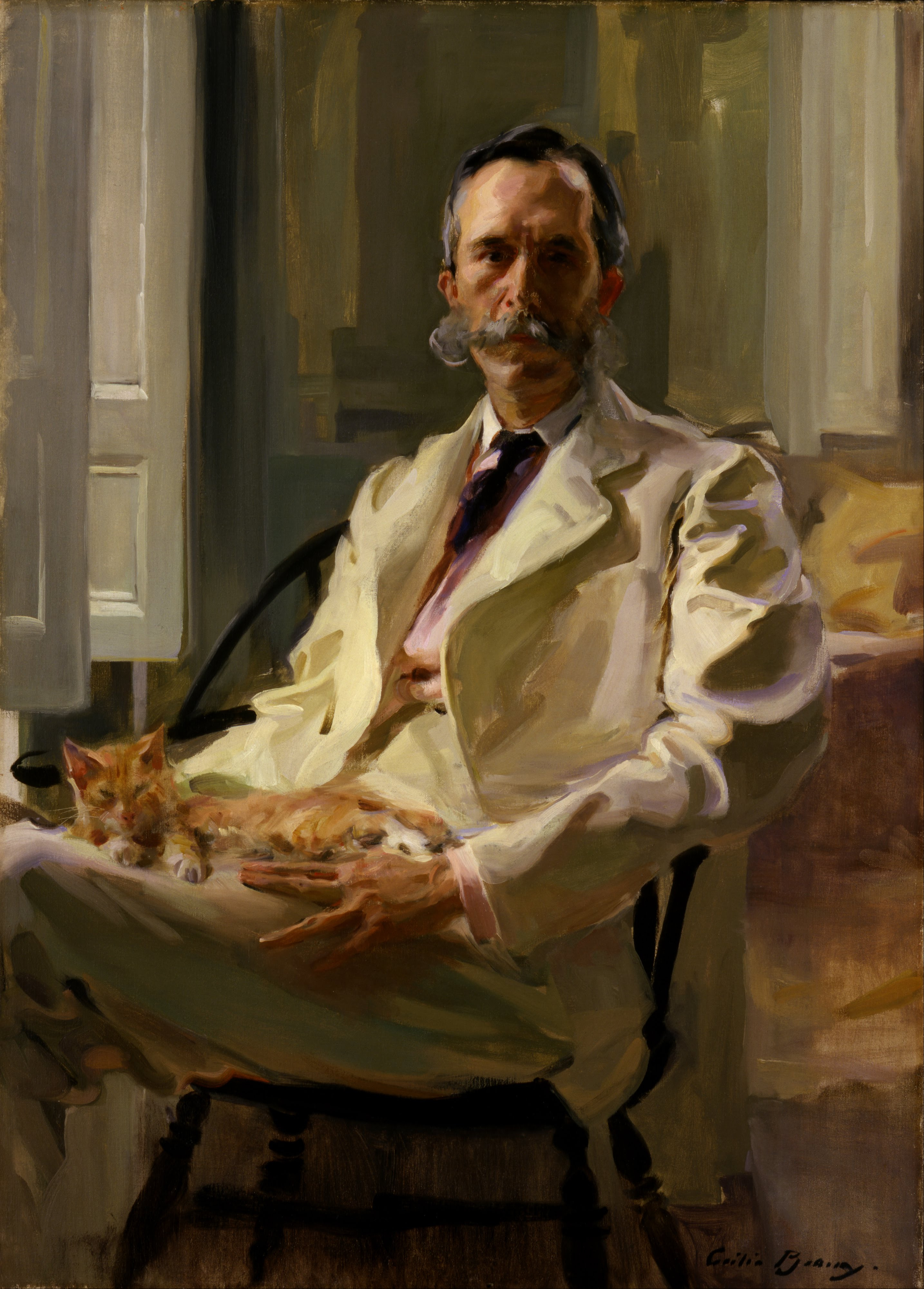
- 1898 painting of Henry Sturgis Drinker by Cecilia Beaux
- Born: November 8, 1850; Hong Kong
- Died: July 27, 1937 (aged 86)
- Resting place: West Laurel Hill Cemetery, Bala Cynwyd, Pennsylvania, U.S.
- Education: Lehigh University
- Occupations: Mechanical engineer, lawyer, president of Lehigh University

Henry Sturgis Drinker (8 November 1850 – 27 July 1937) was an American mechanical engineer, lawyer, author, and the fifth president of Lehigh University. He worked for the Lehigh Valley Railroad and led construction of the two-mile tunnel through Musconetcong Mountain. He published several books and articles on tunnel construction and railroad law. He served as president of the American Forestry Association from 1912 to 1916 and was made an honorary member of the American Institute of Mining and Metallurgical Engineers in 1920.

== Early life and education ==
Drinker was born November 8, 1850, in Hong Kong, the third child of expatriate Philadelphia Quaker merchant Sandwith B. Drinker and Susannah Budd Shober. Sandwith made his first trading voyage to China about 1845, and was joined there about 1849, by his wife and two children, Catherine and Robert. Sandwith died at Macau in January 1858, and Susannah and the children returned to the United States. They settled in Baltimore, where she opened Mrs. Drinker's Academy for Young Ladies. Susannah developed uterine cancer and died two years later, leaving the children orphans.

Drinker graduated from Lehigh University with a degree in mechanical engineering in 1871. He studied law in the offices of James E. Gowen and was admitted to the Philadelphia bar in 1877. He received an LL.D. degree from Lafayette College in 1905, Franklin and Marshall College in 1910, and the University of Pennsylvania in 1911.

== Career ==
From 1871 to 1872, he worked as a coal mining clerk for the Lehigh Valley Coal Company. In 1872, he joined the field corps for the Lehigh Valley Railroad and was put in charge of construction of a two-mile tunnel through New Jersey's Musconetcong Mountains. The tunnel was completed in 1875, and enabled the Easton and Amboy Railroad (a LVRR subsidiary) to bypass canals and deliver Pennsylvania coal directly to its terminal at Perth Amboy, New Jersey, on New York Harbor. After completion of the tunnel, Drinker joined the railroad's main offices in Philadelphia.

Drinker published books and articles on drilling, blasting, and buttressing tunnels. He became an expert on legal matters related to railroad construction, and edited a revised edition of Ball's General Railroad and Telegraph Laws of Pennsylvania (1884). He completed a law degree, and served as general solicitor for the Lehigh Valley Railroad from 1885 to 1905.

=== Lehigh University ===
Coal baron and former LVRR president Asa Packer founded Lehigh University as a tuition-free engineering school for young men. Drinker left the LVRR in 1905, to become the university's fifth president, the first alumnus to hold the position.

Lehigh then consisted of the College of Engineering and the College of Liberal Arts, and could no longer afford to be tuition-free. Students were responsible for finding their own housing and meals off campus. Drinker sought to improve the student experience—the first dormitories and student dining hall were built on campus, the athletic facilities were expanded, and the first fraternity buildings were erected on university land. He established the College of Business in 1910 (endowed by steelmaker John Fritz), and organized the Alumni Association, which published an alumni bulletin and created a university endowment separate from the Packer bequest.

During Pres. Drinker's administration Lehigh University has had a marked expansion in its plant, including the erection of two dormitories, a college dining hall, a student club house, a mining engineering laboratory, a testing engineering laboratory, a new gymnasium and field house, and a complete renovation of the athletic field, including the erection of a concrete stadium.

Drinker served as president of the American Forestry Association from 1912 to 1916. He created the university's forestry department, and beautified the campus with rare trees and plants. Anticipating the U.S.'s entry into World War I, he established an early form of Army ROTC.

Drinker retired from the university in 1920, at age 69.

In 1920, he became an honorary member of the American Institute of Mining and Metallurgical Engineers.

== Personal life ==
Drinker married Aimee Ernesta “Etta” Beaux on December 2, 1879. Etta also had suffered significant childhood loss. When she was 3, her mother died within days of giving birth to her sister, Cecilia Beaux. Unable to cope, their French father left the girls in Philadelphia with his wife's widowed mother, Mrs. John Wheeler Leavitt, and returned to France.

Henry and Etta Drinker had six children:

- Henry "Harry" Sandwith Drinker (1880–1965), lawyer, musician and composer; he married musicologist Sophie Drinker.
- James Blathwaite Drinker (1882–1971), banker, executive with J.B. Drinker & Co.
- Cecil Kent Drinker M.D. (1887–1956), physician and professor, dean of the Harvard School of Public Health; he married physician and researcher Katherine Rotan Drinker.
- Aimee Ernesta Drinker Bullitt Beaux Barlow (1892–1981), interior decorator and writer, radio announcer as "Commando Mary"; she married William Christian Bullitt Jr. and Samuel L. M. Barlow II
- Philip Drinker (1894–1972), chemical engineer and industrial hygienist, co-inventor of the iron lung.
- Catherine Drinker Bowen (1897–1973), historian and biographer, winner of the 1958 National Book Award for Nonfiction

For the first year of their marriage, Henry and Etta Drinker lived with her grandmother Leavitt (and sister Cecilia) in a West Philadelphia house at 4305 Spruce Street. Their first child, Harry, was born there. Between 1880 and 1893, the couple and their growing family lived at various West Philadelphia addresses, before building a large suburban house on the campus of Haverford College. Sons Harry, James and Cecil all graduated from Haverford. Drinker accepted the presidency of Lehigh University in 1905, and the family moved to Bethlehem, Pennsylvania.

In retirement, Henry and Etta Drinker lived in a suburban house in Merion Station, just outside Philadelphia. His sister, Catherine, and their son, Philip, were living with them in 1921, while their son Harry and his wife, Sophie, were living nearby.

At age 80, Henry Sturgis Drinker completed an autobiography (1931, unpublished). He died in 1937 and was interred in West Laurel Hill Cemetery in Bala Cynwyd, Pennsylvania.

== Publications ==
- A Treatise on Explosive Compounds, Machine Rock Drills and Blasting, New York: John Wiley & Sons, 1883
- General Railroad and Telegraph Laws of the State of Pennsylvania, Philadelphia: Allen, Lane & Scott, 1884
- Tunneling, Explosive Compounds, and Rock Drills, New York: John Wiley & Sons, 1893

== See also ==
- List of Lehigh University presidents

Preceded by Thomas Messinger Drown	5th President of Lehigh University; 1905–1920	Succeeded by Charles Russ Richards
