= The Radium Girls: The Dark Story of America's Shining Women =

2016 history book by Kate Moore

- Author: Kate Moore
- Audio read by: Angela Brazil
- Language: English
- Publisher: Sourcebooks, Simon & Schuster UK
- Publication date: June 1, 2016
- Pages: 480 (UK), 504 (US)
- Awards: 2017 Goodreads Choice Award; 2018 American Library Association Notable Nonfiction Book; NYT Bestseller
- ISBN: 9781492650959
- OCLC: 956341099
- Dewey Decimal: 363.17
- LC Class: HD6067.2.U6 M66 2017
- Website: Official Book Website

The Radium Girls: The Dark Story of America's Shining Women is a bestselling book by English author Kate Moore which chronicles the American watch dial painting industry and the lives of the women who painted these dials with luminous paint containing radium-226 to produce radioluminescence, who were known as the Radium Girls. It was published in 2016.

Moore was inspired to write the book after directing a production of the play These Shining Lives by Melanie Marnich. The play is about the young female factory workers in Ottawa, Illinois, who were exposed to radium in the 1920s when painting watch dials. She found that the individual names and lives of the women were often not included in the history books.

Moore covers the period from 1917 into the 1940s and the women who worked at three American studios. She outlines in the book how the real life watch dial painters were required to shape their radium-sodden paintbrushes by using their lips and that health and safety practices to protect the women were non-existent in the dial painting studios. The book is split into three sections "Knowledge," "Power" and "Justice." It also includes a prologue, an epilogue, a postscript and bibliography.

The book has been reviewed by publications including The Atlantic, Booklist, Bustle, Journal of the Mississippi State Medical Association, The San Francisco Book Review, The Spectator, and The Times, as well as the NPR radio network. It has been reviewed by institutions including the Glasgow Women's Library, Royal Society of Chemistry, and the University of Waterloo.

The book was voted the best History & Biography book at the 2017 Goodreads Choice Awards by Goodreads users.

== Adaptions ==
- The 2018 American drama film Radium Girls, starring Joey King and directed by Dean Pilcher, was based on Moore's book.
- In 2019, a younger readers version of the book by Moore was released.
