= Anna Pennybacker =

American suffragette (1861–1938)

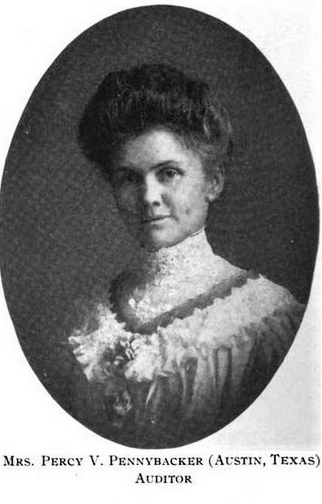
Anna Pennybacker, from a 1908 publication

Anna J. Hardwicke Pennybacker (May 7, 1861 – February 4, 1938), known publicly after her marriage as Mrs. Percy V. Pennybacker, was the president of the American General Federation of Women's Clubs in the early 20th century, a Chautauqua speaker and a leader in the women's suffrage movement.

== Personal ==
Anna J. Hardwicke was born May 7, 1861, in Petersburg, Virginia, the daughter of John Benjamin Hardwicke, a Baptist minister, and his wife, the former Martha Dews. The family moved to Texas when she was 17, and in 1880 she graduated from the new Normal Institute in Huntsville, then taught in Bryan Grammar School. Before 1884 she taught in Missouri.

She and Percy Vivian Pennybacker were married on October 31, 1884, or November 1, 1884, in Smith County, Texas (1856-1899), and they moved to Tyler, Texas, where he became school superintendent and appointed her as history teacher and principal at Central High School. She taught there for nine years, and in 1893 went with her husband to Palestine, Texas, where he had a new position.

She was a friend of Eleanor Roosevelt; they were often guests of each other in their homes.

She died February 4, 1938, in Austin. Governor James V. Allred ordered the flag over the State Capitol to be lowered to half staff as a woman who has endeared herself to the hearts of all Texans." A funeral service was at St. David's Episcopal Church.

She was survived by two sons, Percy V. Pennybacker and Paul Bonner Pennybacker; a daughter, Ruth; and three siblings, A.S. Hardwicke, Mrs. T.T. Holloway and Mrs. B.C. Epperson.

== Activities ==
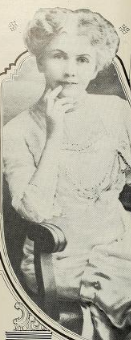
Anna Pennybacker (1912)

After quitting her paid work, Mrs. Pennybacker became active in the women's club movement; from 1901-1903 she was president of the Texas Federation of Women's Clubs, and in 1912 she was elected president of the General Federation of Women's Clubs for a two-year term.

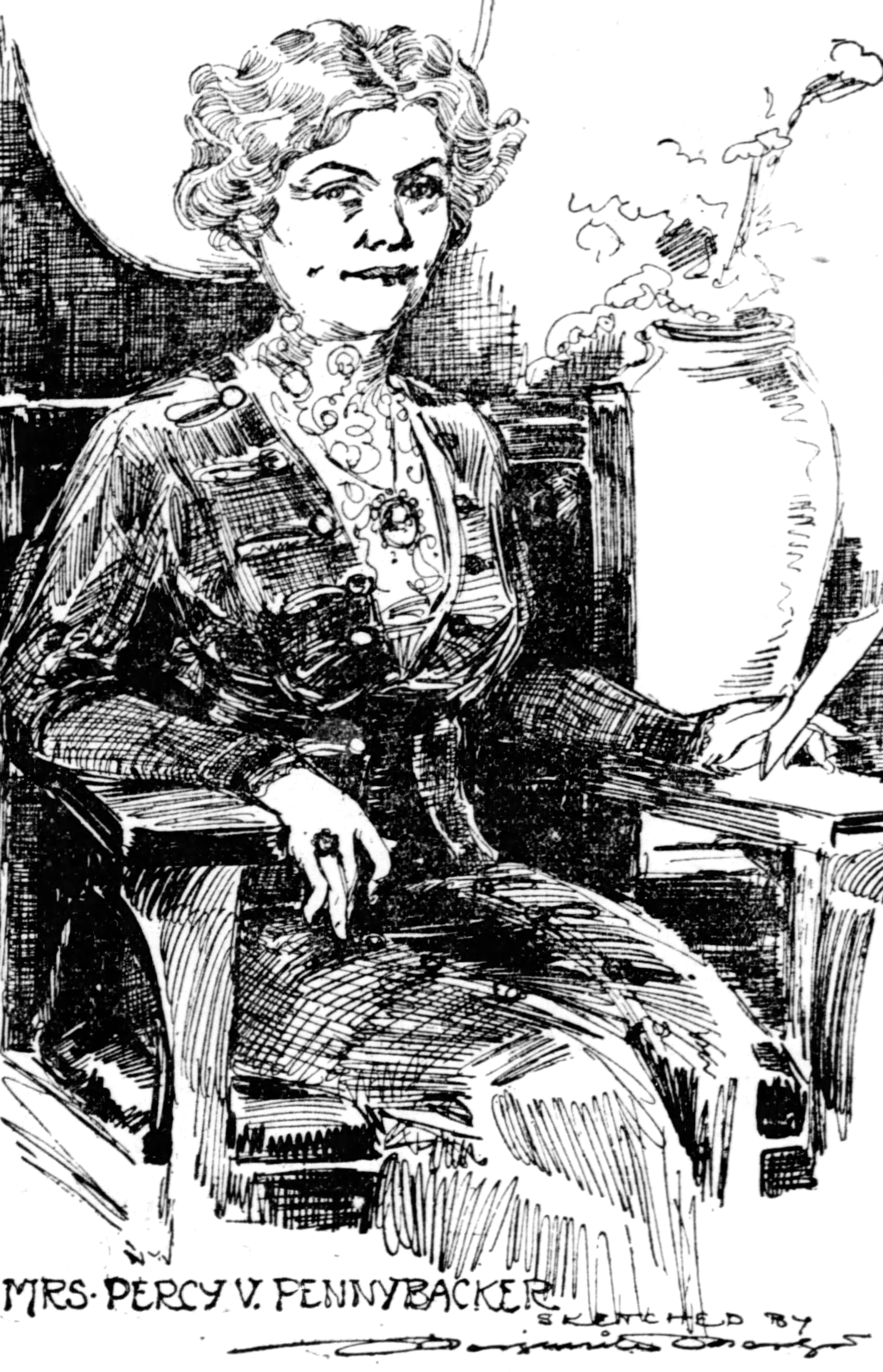
Pennybacker as sketched by Marguerite Martyn for the St. Louis Post-Dispatch, February 1913

In 1888, she published A New History of Texas for Schools, which was adopted as the official text for public schools. In 1913, she told the fourth American Peace Conference that the then-current method of celebrating Independence Day in the United States was a "travesty." She suggested that

children form floral processions at school buildings, march to some central point which would be made the scene of a general celebration, in which places of honor would be given to young men who have arrived at the age of 21 within the year. She further advocated that speeches should be made to these young men and that civic oaths containing peace clauses should be administered.

The same year she urged that measures be taken to enforce the 1906 Pure Food and Drug Act.

In 1915, Mrs. Pennybacker became head of the National Women's Committee of Near East Relief, which had orphanages in Greece and in Palestine.

A pacifist, she reluctantly supported American involvement in World War I.

Afterwards, she set her goals on international peace and disarmament by working as a special correspondent to the League of Nations. She urged the United States to join the World Court and to sign the Kellogg-Briand Pact, renouncing war as an instrument of national policy.

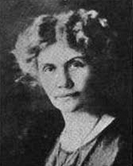
Anna Pennybacker, 1921

In a 1926 talk in Carnegie Hall, she told of her recent trip to Geneva and Greece. She was noted as "one of the most gifted speakers on the platform today."

Active in the Chautauqua movement, Mrs. Pennybacker persuaded John D. Rockefeller Jr. to donate money that staved off bankruptcy. in 1935. She also influenced President Franklin Delano Roosevelt to speak at a fund-raising event.

== Legacy ==
In Texas, a rose was named in her honor in 1929. It was noted as "A fine grower, with stout thornless canes coming freely from the base of the plant. Peach-pink with silvery suffusions in color."

She bequeathed $5,000 to Sam Houston State Teachers College in Huntsville, Texas, to establish a Pennybacker scholarship "for the cultivation in the student body of a love for the true and beautiful in life."
