= Radium silk =

Lightweight silk fabric

Radium silk was particularly popular for use in women's loungewear and undergarments. It was also used in gowns for weddings and evening wear and for fancy garment linings.

Radium silk was a commonly used name for a type of lightweight, lustrous silk primarily used in women's clothing and undergarments from the middle of the first decade of the 1900s until the term went out of vogue in the 1920s. Although the name references radium, a radioactive element first discovered in 1898, the substance is not contained in the fabric. As the deleterious effects of radium on the human body became better known in the middle-1920s, the use of the word as an adjective gained a negative connotation and fell out of favor among advertisers and consumers alike.

== History ==
=== Origin ===
The product name "radium silk" was already in common enough use for a California department store to lead with it in this July 1903 sale advertisement.

The descriptive term "radium silk" began to be used no later than 1903. The term apparently originated in the fashion markets of Paris in association with particularly lustrous fabrics, with reference made to the newly discovered element radium, first identified in 1898. The material was notable both for its gloss and strength.

"Radium silk" did not contain radium or any other radioactive material. Rather, it was named for its tendency to shimmer in light, bringing to mind the phosphorescence of the world's newly discovered heavy metal.

The term was successfully trademarked in the United States by the Gilbert Company of New York City, which registered the mark in August 1905. Despite this proprietary claim, the phrase "radium silk" was generally used in a generic context throughout the United States. The word "radium" had a very positive connotation in this period and was used as a vapid qualifying adjective, similar to the way that the words "platinum" and "titanium" are bandied about for products not containing either metal today.

By the fall of 1906, "radium silk" had truly arrived in the fashion world of the United States. A September 1906 syndicated plate, appearing in dozens of newspapers around the country, enthusiastically described the "exquisitely toned material which has had such vogue in Paris for the last few months."

The article continued:

Surely there are few fabrics which can better stand popular favor. There is a delicacy, luster, and wonderful color to the radium silks that makes them peculiarly satisfying to a refined taste.

Akin to the best foulards and liberty gauzes is it, with the best qualities of both. Heavier and finer weaves than the latter, it has all its graceful clinginess, with greater durability, while the softness and simple patterns of the former are enhanced by a high sheen, caused by being woven of organzine so fine that the single thread is barely visible.

But the chief beauty of the radium silks is their opalescent coloring, so indescribably lovely. A pink will have the soft blush of the heart of a shell; the tint of the sky shining through a fleeting cloud on a sunny day is seen in the blues, while the lavenders, greens, yellows, and even the darker colors all have the soft undertones that gives them a beautiful iridescent effect.

=== Downfall ===
Although many consumer products of this era were made containing radium, which was initially believed to have highly salutary properties, bright and shiny radium silk did not.

The turning point for "radium silk" came in 1925, when the New York Times broke the news of five deaths of watch face-painters from radiation poisoning, developed by handling radium on the job. Descriptions of the new ailment, referred to as radium necrosis, were grisly, and the disintegrating jaws and cancers developed by these Radium Girls attracted national attention. By the end of the decade the term "radium" was no longer viable as a positive descriptor, and it was hastily abandoned.

== See also ==
- Radium Girls
