= Mary Shapard =

American author and peace activist

Mary L. Shapard
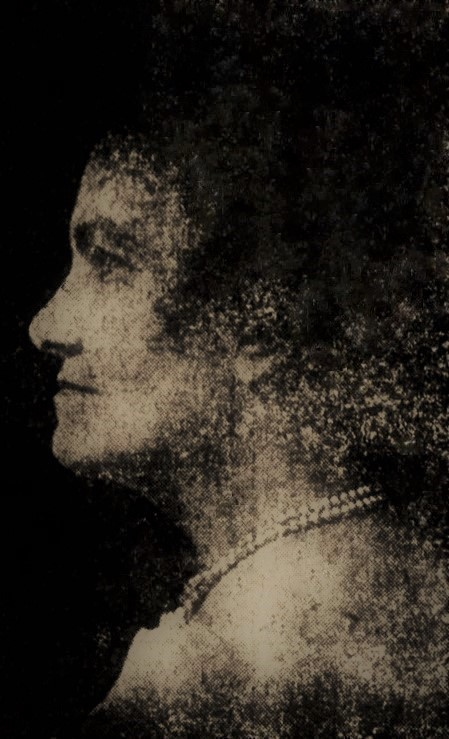
- Mary Ligon Shapard, 1918
- Born: Mary Ligon c. 1882–1888; Mississippi, United States
- Died: c. early 1950s
- Other names: Mary Ligon Christensen, Mrs. Charles R. Shapard, Mary Myers
- Occupations: Author and peace activist
- Years active: 1910–1925
- Known for: Nominated for the Nobel Peace Prize by U.S. Senator Morris Sheppard
- Parent(s): Buxton T. Ligon (1839-1894) and Sarah Cornelia (Barrett) Ligon (1849-1932)

Mary Ligon Shapard (c. 1882 – c. 1950s), also known as Mary Ligon Christensen, Mrs. Charles R. Shapard, or Mary Myers, was an American author and peace activist who was nominated by United States Senator Morris Sheppard for the Nobel Peace Prize for her World War I-era recommendation that a nonpartisan "league of nations" be established by world leaders to reduce the likelihood of future armed conflicts between countries engaged in international disputes. Reportedly the first American to advocate for the formation of a "league of nations," she was also reportedly the author of the original text used by United States President Woodrow Wilson to create his proposed covenant for the League of Nations, which was subsequently formed on January 10, 1920.

She also urged that women's voices be heard and heeded:

"We are today living in a period of prejudice and misrepresentation. England and France have their historians and photographers at the front, so as to keep the record straight, and now is the time to give a correct register of the American women who are so patriotically responding to our country's needs."

== Formative years ==
Born as Mary Ligon in Mississippi, circa 1882, in a house that had been previously used as a Union Army headquarters building by United States General Ulysses S. Grant prior to his capture of the city of Vicksburg during the American Civil War, Mary Ligon Shapard was a daughter of Buxton T. Ligon (1839-1894) and Sarah Cornelia (Barrett) Ligon (1849-1932). Her father, who had been a soldier in the Confederate States Army (CSA) during that war, had served as a private with Company A of the 1st Mississippi Light Artillery, which was assigned to the CSA's Department of Alabama, Mississippi, and East Louisiana.

By February 14, 1901, she was using the married surname of Christensen, according to a notice in The Clarion-Ledger newspaper in Jackson, Mississippi, which announced that she and her parents, "Baxton" T. and Sarah C. Ligon, and siblings Allen Ligon, Eugenia B. Ligon, J. Allen Ligon, John P. Ligon, Kate Ligon, Minnie Ligon, and Cornelia McGary, were "commanded to appear before the Chancery Court of the first district of Hinds county, Mississippi, on the 2d Monday in March, A.D. 1901, to defend the suit ... of W. J. Caesar, and others."

By 1911, Mary L. Christensen moved to Wichita Falls, Texas. On February 9 of 1911, she was elected as secretary of that community's Civic League and presented the following resolution:

"Our State Institutions are erected and maintained by taxation, levied alike on men and women, regardless of political parties or administrations.

Whereas, It has been the practice of the incoming governors to oust the heads of State Institutions, and to appoint such heads as will strengthen them politically, therefore be it

Resolved, That all State Institutions be kept out of politics; that no administration of any State Institution be changed on account of political preference; or for any reason whatsoever except for the betterment of such institutions; where competent executives are now in charge of State Institutions they be retained so long as the good of such institutions required their service."

Two months later, she was appointed to the civil service reform committee of the Texas Federation of Women's Clubs. By March 1913, she was a member of the executive committee of that statewide organization. By April 1913, she was chair of the Peace Movement Committee of the Texas Federation of Women's Clubs and honorary vice president of the International Peace Forum. A delegate to the Fourth American Peace Congress in late April, she lobbied for the creation of an international peace court to resolve international disputes and prevent future wars. In August 1913, she was one of two delegates to represent Texas at a peace conference that was held in The Hague, Netherlands.

A resident of Port Arthur, Texas, she was widowed sometime around late 1913 or early 1914 and took a nearly year-long break from her advocacy work for the Texas Federation of Women's Clubs before returning in November 1914.

Having recently relocated to Houston in September 1915, she became involved in planning the Texas Woman's Fair. Still known as Mary Ligon Christensen (alternate spellings "Leigon" and "Christinsen"), she was documented by newspapers as the mother of Will Christensen of Houston, but changed her surname again when she married Charles R. Shapard shortly before or during 1918.

=== Activism and writing ===
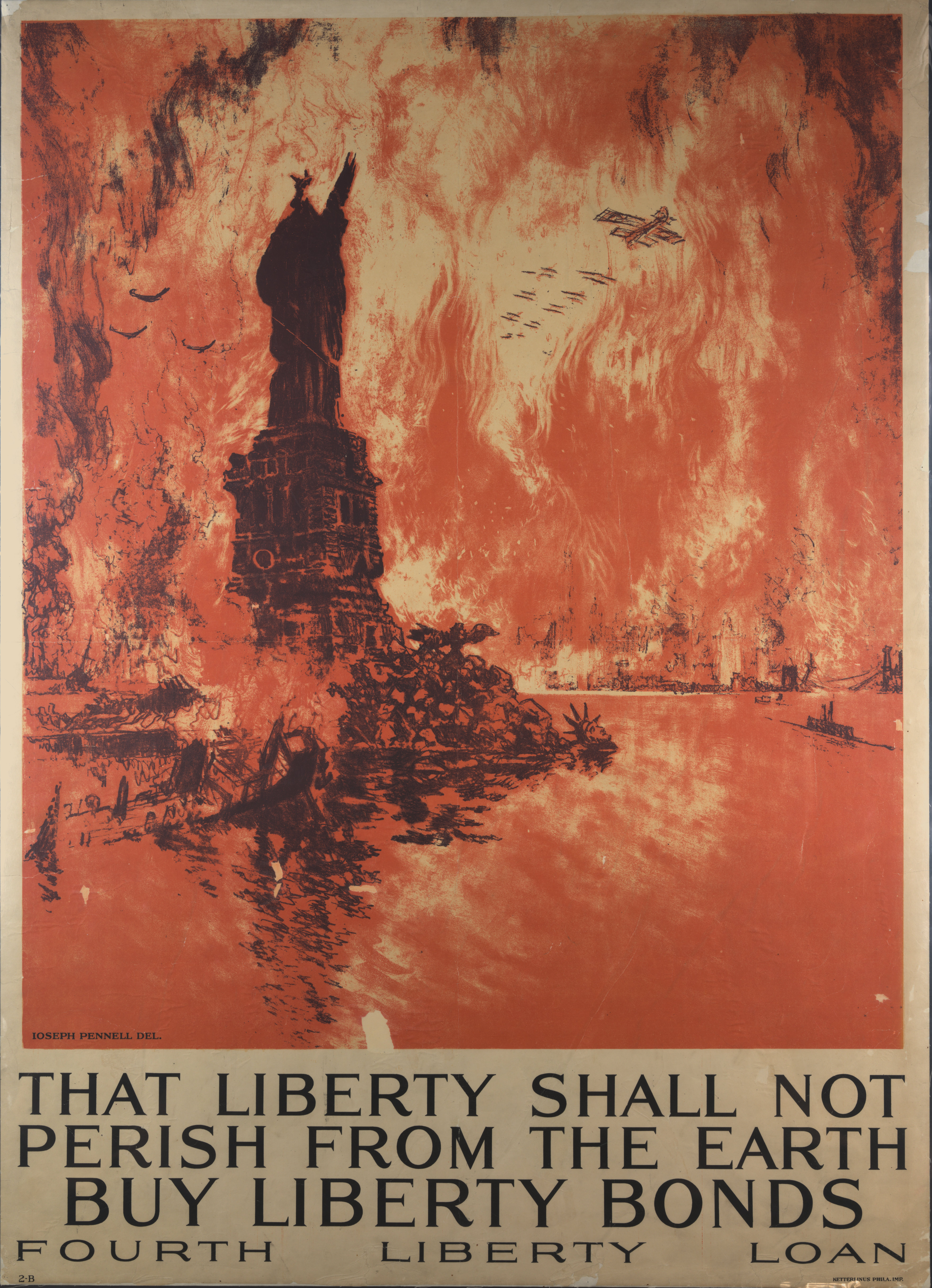
U.S. Liberty bond poster

It was while living in Houston and Port Arthur, Texas before and during World War I that Shapard truly achieved nationwide and international prominence. A member of multiple civic organizations and women's clubs, she was actively involved with the American Red Cross and the sale of Liberty Bonds and Thrift Stamps to raise funds to support war-time operations of the state and federal governments. A chair of both the women's and children's departments of the Council of National Defense, she also volunteered with the state's food distribution network.

During October 1918, Shapard resided at The Rice Hotel in Houston, where she researched and began writing a series of articles and a book on prominent American women who were involved in professional and volunteer work related to World War I. Newspapers reported that she was receiving support for her efforts from United States Senator Morris Sheppard, who wrote, "I am glad to know you contemplate writing a history of Texas women and I commend the project most heartily."

She also spent time at the Houston home of her friend and fellow women's club member, Mrs. R. R. Dancy. By November of that same year, she had decided on two possible titles for her book, "Patriotic War Women and War Mothers of America" and "War Mothers and Patriotic Women," and was collaborating with Ida Howie Walker, who was helping her locate and collate data. Shapard also attended the state council meeting of the Daughters of the American Revolution in Dallas during the first week of that month.

=== Nobel Peace Prize nomination ===
In 1918, Shapard was nominated for the Nobel Peace Prize by U.S. Senator Morris Sheppard in recognition of her post-World War I recommendation that a nonpartisan "league of nations" be established by world leaders to reduce the likelihood of future armed conflicts between nations engaged in international disputes. Reportedly the first American to advocate for the formation of this type of international arbitration body, she was also reportedly the author of the original text used by United States President Woodrow Wilson to create his proposed covenant for the League of Nations. The League of Nations was later officially founded on January 4, 1920.

According to The Salt Lake Telegram, Sheppard's nomination of Shapard was supported by nominations from the International Peace Forum in New York City, current and former governors of Texas, the governor of Alabama, and multiple organizations, including the Texas Federation of Women's Clubs, the Texas Press Association, the University of Texas, and "all religious, civic and educational organizations of the state of Texas."

In offering their support, members of the Texas Federation of Women's Clubs and the Texas Press Association, wrote and published the following resolution of support for Shapard's nomination:

"Whereas, God, in His all wise [sic] infinite wisdom and mercy has seen fit to use our present national administration as His handiwork in negotiating treaties of peace among nations of the world thereby making sudden warfare practically preventable between the nations that have signed these treaties.

And, whereas sudden warfare is no longer to be dreaded, therefore there appears to be no longer a need of maintaining a large standing army and navy that is such an enormous expense to maintain. It costs the United States 43 percent of all our national revenue to keep prepared for war in time of peace and in addition 29 per cent in time of peace to pay pensions for past wars. Seventy-two percent per annum all told is the cost of keeping prepared for wars and in the past for pensions.

And whereas, if this ever increasing [sic] expense for maintaining standing armies and navies is stopped there will be more money for educational purposes and to aid in the economical problems that confront us; in lessening the burden of taxation; in the advantageous marketing of our products and in making farm life more attractive.

And, whereas the present burdensome cost of armaments is out of harmony with the spirit of the age—relics of dark and barbarous days which we hope will never come to us again.

Therefore, be it resolved,

First: That we earnestly petition our national government to enter into treaties with all the nations of the earth who will reciprocate with us, and who will jointly agree one with another and us not to increase the present strength of their armies and navies not to spend more money on their upkeep than is necessary to maintain their present efficiency pending an understanding for the agreement for eventual disarmament of all individual nations party to this covenant, allowing these nations to have a home guard or national guard sufficient to protect their peoples within their borders and an international army and navy for the mutual protection of all nations entering this treaty just as each State in the United States has its home guard and just as the United States has its regular soldiers.

Second: The expense of this international guard to be pro rated [sic] among the nations entering this treaty.

Third: The size and purchase of this international guard to be determined by a commission or a board of governors elected by each nation entering this treaty—a commission selected similar to our national senate."

Not a pacifist, according to her supporters, Shapard was reportedly someone who "favor[ed] fighting until German autocracy [was] crushed so it [would] never rise again," but also strongly believed that global peace would more likely be achieved if children were educated in classrooms worldwide about the causes of war and ways to prevent it. As a result, she became an advocate for improvements to the nation's public education system.

In September 1920, Shapard observed:

"The league of nations is the most important thing before the world today.... I was born in the aftermath of war and I know what a league of nations can do. It is not the number of killed and wounded but the blight of after years that makes war intolerable."

=== Publications ===
Shapard was the researcher, author or co-author of several articles, club documents and at least one book, Healing as Taught by Jesus Christ, which she co-authored in 1919 with George Wesley Sullivan; however, it appears that she never published the women's history book she had been working on and had considering titling, "Patriotic War Women and War Mothers of America" or "War Mothers and Patriotic Women."

=== Affiliations ===
Shapard's civic and social organization affiliations included the:

- American Red Cross
- Council of National Defense (chair of the women's and children's departments)
- Daughters of the American Revolution
- Houston Pen Women
- International Peace Forum, New York City (honorary president)
- Texas Federation of Women's Clubs
- United Daughters of the Confederacy

She also volunteered with World War I-era food administration programs in the Texas communities where she lived.

== Later years ==
Documented by the 1920 U.S. Census as a widow, writer and native of Mississippi, Shapard was a lodger at a hotel in Kansas City, Missouri on New Year's Day of that year. By February, she was living in Boise, Idaho, where she had begun a metaphysical healing practice. That April, she was described in Boise area newspapers as a metaphysician and teacher who was presenting educational programs at the Boise Unity Center. Session titles included "The Truth of Being," "Healing" and "Prosperity."

Before that month was out, however, her life took another major turn when she wed thirty-three-year-old Cassimir K. Myers (1888-1951) on April 20, 1920.

Still using her professional name of Mary L. Shapard, she embarked on a speaking a tour in September 1920, during which she gave a series of spiritual lectures to audiences in Boise, Salt Lake City and other communities across the western United States. Three years later, she was still using that name while advertising herself as a metaphysician and Christian healer in Alexandria, Louisiana.

But by 1935, her life had become less public. She lived with her husband Cassimir Myers in Garland County, Arkansas, where they owned and operated a farm in Mountain Valley. She was still residing there during the early 1950s, according to the 1950 federal census.

== See also ==
- Covenant of the League of Nations
- List of peace activists
