= Texas Federation of Women's Clubs =

- Abbreviation: TFWC
- Predecessor: Texas Federation of Literary Clubs
- Founded: 1897
- Founded at: Waco, Texas
- Type: Non-governmental organization
- Purpose: volunteerism
- Affiliations: General Federation of Women's Clubs
- Website: www.gfwctexas.org

The Texas Federation of Women's Clubs (TFWC) is a non-profit women's organization in Texas which was founded in 1897. The purpose of the group is to create a central organization for women's clubs and their members in Texas relating to education, the environment, home and civic life, the arts and Texas history. Seventy-percent of public libraries in Texas were created through the work of the members and clubs of the TFWC.

== History ==
The TFWC had its origins with local women's clubs throughout the state of Texas. Many of these clubs were organized for "self-culture and intellectual development." Over time the idea that local clubs would benefit by sharing and communicating with other clubs in the state grew among various club members. In 1894, a Woman's Congress was held at the Texas State Fair in Dallas. The ideas and networking opportunities for many different women's club members from across Texas helped shape the TFWC. As early as 1895, the Wednesday Club of Fort Worth put forth idea to create a federation of women's clubs. However, it was Mrs. Edward Rotan (Kate Sturm McCall Rotan) in Waco who finally reached out by letter to invite various clubs to send representatives in order to create the TFWC. The TFWC first organized under the name of the Texas Federation of Literary Clubs in 1897. Rotan was voted the first president of the TFWC. Olga Bernstein Kohlberg was the first vice-president.

The twenty-one original charter clubs of TFWC were the American History Club and the Pathfinder's Club of Austin, the Magazine Club of Cleburne, XIX Century Club of Corsicana, several clubs from Dallas, including the Current Events Club, the Pierian Club, the Shakespeare Club and the Standard Club, the Ariel Literary Society of Denton, The Women's Wednesday Club and the '93 Club of Fort Worth, The Wednesday Club of Galveston, the Women's Club and the Ladies' Reading Club of Houston, the Owl Club of McKinney, the Shakespeare Club of Sherman, the Quid Nunc Club of Tyler, the Social Science Club of Terrell, the Literary and the Woman's Club of Waco and the XXI Club of Denison. The TFWC limited club membership to groups who were recommended by two other clubs already in the TFWC and most members were white and middle or upper class. In 1899, they joined the General Federation of Women's Clubs and changed their name to the Texas Federation of Women's Clubs. TFWC organized itself into five districts, and in 1901, there were 132 clubs involved.

The TFWC agreed to help establish public libraries in Texas in 1898. From 1901-1903, Anna Pennybacker was president, and under her tenure, helped establish a "traveling library and art collection" and raised $3,500 for women's scholarships at the University of Texas. Later, TFWC would be involved in establishing the creation of the Texas State Library and Archives Commission. TFWC, along with the Texas Library Association and George Garrison of the University of Texas, helped pass the 1909 bill to create the Texas State Library. TFWC was also heavily invested in creating "traveling libraries," throughout Texas. TFWC maintained responsibility for these libraries until 1916 when the Texas State Library took over.

TFWC has also been involved in historic preservation. In 1904, they helped to raise money to purchase the Alamo Mission and the grounds surrounding it.

In 1916, there were 450 clubs with a membership of 16,000. TFWC worked to influence women to run for local school boards. In 1923, the group began to publish the Texas Federation News. TFWC was also involved in traveling art exhibits in the 1920s. Mrs. H.B. Fall helped establish "cottage art centers" around Texas through TFWC.

In 1932, the first cornerstone was set for the Texas Federation of Women's Clubs Headquarters in Austin. By the late 1930s, the TFWC had grown to include 1,200 clubs and about 60,000 members. Margaret Sanger recognized that receiving the endorsement of the TFWC for the promotion of family planning for women would be important to helping Texas support birth control. Sanger was able to obtain an endorsement of birth control from TFWC with the help of Katie Ripley of Dallas in 1936. Ripley was able to get TFWC to "pass a resolution recommending that birth control be provided by state and local public clinics" in 1937.

In 1948, the Texas Federation News became a bimonthly publication called the Texas Clubwoman. The Texas Clubwoman is still in publication.

Club membership decreased over time, with a membership of 13,000 women and 500 clubs in 1985 and in 1992, 384 clubs.

== Notable members ==
- Birdie Robertson Johnson (1868–1926), president from 1905 to 1907
- Olga Bernstein Kohlberg, first vice president
- Anna Pennybacker, president from 1901 to 1903
- Mary Shapard, nominated for a Nobel Peace Prize
- Cornelia Branch Stone (1840–1925), first vice president, TXFWC; president-general, United Daughters of the Confederacy; president, Texas Woman's Press Association
- Adella Turner, president from 1904-1906

== See also ==
- Texas Federation of Women's Clubs Headquarters
- General Federation of Women's Clubs
