= Radium Dolls =

Australian punk-rock group

- Origin: Brisbane, Queensland, Australia
- Genre: punk-rock
- Years active: 2019–present
- Label: AWAL
- Members: Ewan Day; Bryce Equinox; Thomas Perkins; William Perkins
- Website: www.radiumdolls.org

Radium Dolls are an Australian punk rock group formed in Brisbane. The band name refers to the radium girl factory workers, a story that interested band member William Perkins and suggested by his girlfriend. Their 2024 debut album Legal Speed earned a nomination at the 2025 Queensland Music Awards.

In January 2026, they released Wound Up, which became their first charting album on the ARIA Charts.

== History ==
=== 2019–2023: Formation and early EPs ===
The group released their debut single "My Girl" in January 2020, followed by their debut EP Bel-Haven in July 2020. This was followed by All Doll'd Up in 2023.

=== 2024-present: Legal Speed and Wound Up ===
In 2024, the group released their debut studio album Legal Speed, followed by a live recording Legal Speed (Live from the Farm). In June 2025, they released "Scorching Heat" , which was a finalist in the 2025 Unsigned Only Awards.

In December 2025, the group announced the forthcoming release of Wound Up.

== Discography ==
=== Studio albums ===
List of studio albums, with selected details
Title	Album details	Peak chart positions
Title	Album details	AUS
Legal Speed	Released: 18 March 2024; Format: LP, digital; Label: Radium Dolls (LS001)	—
Wound Up	Released: 30 January 2026; Format: LP, digital; Label: AWAL (RD-002)	17

=== Live albums ===
List of live albums, with selected details
Title	Album details
Legal Speed (Live from the Farm)	Released: 24 August 2024; Format: digital; Label: Radium Dolls

=== Extended plays ===
List of EPs, with selected details
Title	EP details
Bel-Haven	Released: July 2020; Format: digital; Label: Radium Dolls
All Doll'd Up	Released: April 2023; Format: digital; Label: Radium Dolls

== Awards and nominations ==
=== The Triffid - Queensland Album of the Year ===
The Triffid - Queensland Album of the Year is an annual award that is presented to a Queensland band or musical act for the best album of the year. The winner is selected from six nominees and they the spine of their album art painted on the 'Triffid Wall'.

Year	Nominee / work	Award	Result
2026	Wound Up	Qld Album of the Year	Nominated
