= Alice Gast =

American researcher (1958–2025)

Alice Gast FREng
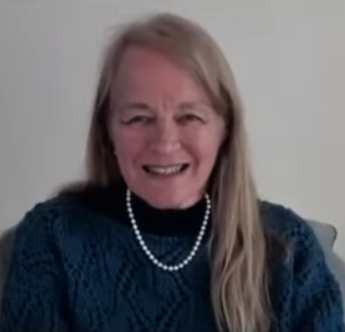
- Gast in 2021

16th President of Imperial College London
- In office September 1, 2014 – July 31, 2022
- Preceded by: Keith O'Nions
- Succeeded by: Hugh Brady

13th President of Lehigh University
- In office 2006–2014
- Preceded by: Gregory C. Farrington
- Succeeded by: Kevin L. Clayton (acting)

Personal details
- Born: Alice Petry Gast; May 25, 1958 Houston, Texas, U.S.
- Died: October 27, 2025 (aged 67) Carperby, North Yorkshire, England
- Spouse: Bradley J. Askins
- Children: 2
- Education: University of Southern California (BS); Princeton University (MA, PhD)
- Profession: Academic, researcher
- Scientific career
- Fields: Chemical engineering
- Workplaces: Stanford University; Massachusetts Institute of Technology; Lehigh University; Imperial College London
- Thesis: A study of polymer-induced phase transitions in colloidal suspensions (1984)
- Doctoral advisors: William B. Russel; Carol K. Hall

Alice Petry Gast (May 25, 1958 – October 27, 2025) was an American researcher who was the 16th president of Imperial College London, and sat on the board of directors of Chevron. Gast was named one of the top 100 "modern era" engineers in the U.S. under the category of "leadership" by the American Institute of Chemical Engineers.

== Early life and education ==
Born in Houston, Texas, Gast graduated as valedictorian from the University of Southern California in 1980 with a BSc degree in chemical engineering. She completed her postgraduate work at Princeton University, receiving an MA degree (1981) and a PhD degree (1984) in chemical engineering, with thesis on Polymer-Induced Phase Transitions in Colloidal Suspensions and was a Hertz Fellow.

== Career and research ==
After her doctorate, Gast spent a postdoctoral year completing a NATO fellowship at the École Supérieure de Physique et de Chimie Industrielles in Paris. From 1985 to 2001, she taught at Stanford University, and then moved to the Massachusetts Institute of Technology, where she served as the vice president for research and associate provost until her appointment as Lehigh University president in 2006.

The focus of Gast's research career was the study of surface and interfacial phenomena, in particular the behavior of complex fluids. Her areas of research include colloidal aggregation and ordering, protein lipid interactions, and enzyme reactions at surfaces. She is the co-author of Physical Chemistry of Surfaces, a classic textbook on colloid and surface phenomena, and has presented named lectures at several of the nation's leading research institutions.

=== Presidency of Imperial College London ===
Gast was named president of Imperial College London on 3 January 2014, taking up post on 1 September 2014. She succeeded Keith O'Nions. As president, Gast led the college's strategy, including the development of its new 25-acre campus, Imperial West, and its links to government, industry, philanthropists and alumni.

In September 2021, Hugh Brady was announced as Gast's successor at Imperial College London. He took up his post in August 2022.

=== President-and-provost leadership model ===
In April 2012, Imperial's governing council agreed to separate into two the role of the rector (the head of the university), and create the senior positions of president and provost.

The role of president gives emphasis to Imperial's relationships with government, industry, philanthropists and alumni and enhances the college's ability to influence in the UK and overseas. The provost is responsible for delivering and enhancing the college's academic mission in education, research and the translation of research results into practical outcomes. The president-and-provost model is common at many other world-leading universities, including MIT, Caltech, Yale and Harvard.

When the transition to the new model and the search for its new senior positions began in 2012, the title changed to president & rector. Once the provost had been appointed and the transition was complete, Gast was known as president & rector.

=== Presidency of Lehigh University ===
From August 2006 to August 2014, Gast was the 13th president of Lehigh University. Gast is not the first Lehigh president recruited from MIT. In 1895, they invited Thomas Messinger Drown to take the presidency, for whom Drown Hall is named. In November 2010, Lehigh's board of trustees voted to reappoint Gast to a second five-year term through 2016.

During Gast's tenure, Lehigh completed a campus-wide strategic planning and implementation process, concluded a $500-million capital campaign and raised an additional $225 million in new resources for the university. Gast also expanded the university's work in and with the City of Bethlehem, increased the size of the university's footprint with the addition of the 750-acre Stabler Campus, increased the university's international presence and has perpetuated and expanded innovative new approaches to student-directed learning with the launch of Lehigh's Mountaintop Campus initiative.

=== Iacocca donation for international scholars program ===
In 2011, the automotive executive Lee Iacocca, an alumnus of Lehigh University, gave $5 million in endowment to support the creation of a new international internship program. It provides an array of international work experiences for Lehigh students that include international co-ops, research experiences, and internships or cohort internships. The cohort internships are led by a Lehigh faculty member that matches Lehigh students with their peers from another country to work as a team on a common problem within a multinational corporation. Gast commented that the gift would "provide opportunities for our students to gain a deeper understanding of the unique challenges that exist in an interdependent and highly connected global society".

=== Reducing high-risk behaviors ===
In 2011, Lehigh joined top schools across the country as a part of an innovative program focused on reducing high-risk drinking behaviors as a part of the National Institute on Alcohol Abuse and Alcoholism (NIAAA). In 2010, Gast was named to the NIAAA College Presidents.

=== Finalizing Lehigh's sustainability plan ===
In mid-April 2009, Gast moved forward on a commitment to the environment by pledging to make environmental sustainability and climate change an institutional priority at the university. Gast signed the Lehigh University Climate Commitment at an Earth Day celebration. The Climate Commitment will create institutional policies and procedures to manage the development and implementation of a university-wide plan that affirms Lehigh's commitment to protect and improve the environment through its teaching, research, faculty, student and staff service, and administrative operations. In signing the Climate Commitment, Gast said that safeguarding the environment is an issue the Lehigh community aggressively embraces.

=== Lord Dearing Memorial Conference ===
In 2010, Gast shared her educational expertise at the Lord Dearing Memorial Conference, a forum for accomplished educators to shape the debate on the future of education. Gast presented in a session discussing the global economic crisis and higher education.

=== Appointment as a U.S. science envoy ===
In 2010, Gast was selected as one of three new science envoys by Secretary of State Hillary Clinton. Gast was charged with encouraging U.S. global engagement in science and technology. She has traveled to the Central Asian and Caucasus regions, including Kazakhstan, Uzbekistan, and Azerbaijan. She has advised the White House, the State Department and the U.S. scientific community about the knowledge and insights she has gained from her travels and interactions.

=== Leading the National Academy of Science review of the 2001 anthrax case ===
In February 2011, a 16-member panel of scientists led by Gast released a report after reviewing the scientific evidence related to the FBI investigation of the anthrax letters mailed in the aftermath of the September 11 attacks in 2001. Anthrax spores contained in the letters were mailed across the country and were responsible for killing five people and sickening 17 others. The panel declared that it was not possible to reach a definitive conclusion about the origins of the anthrax in letters based on the science alone. Gast stated in a news conference that "We find the scientific evidence to be consistent with their conclusions but not as definitive as stated". She emphasized that this case rested on the complex interface between science and the law enforcement investigation. The panel convened in 2008 after the FBI asked the National Research Council to form a group to conduct an independent review of the scientific approaches, methodologies and analytical techniques used in its investigation and to determine whether the FBI reached appropriate scientific conclusions. The FBI's investigation connected the letter materials to a flask in the lab of a researcher at the U.S. Army Medical Research Institute for Infectious Diseases (USAMRIID).

The panel reviewed 9,600 pages of material before determining that it could not rule out that there were other sources of the anthrax spores. Panelists whose expertise included microbiology, medicine, physical chemistry, biochemistry and forensic science were not asked to judge the law enforcement investigation.

=== Professional associations and committee memberships ===
Gast served on a number of national advisory committees and boards, including the board of the American Association for the Advancement of Science (AAAS), was a member of the Academic Research Council for the Singapore Ministry of Education and the National Research Council Committee for Science, Technology, and the Law. She was a member of AAAS, the American Chemical Society, the American Institute of Chemical Engineers, and the American Physical Society.

In October 2012, Gast was elected to the board of directors of the Chevron Corporation, one of the world's leading integrated energy companies, with subsidiaries that conduct business worldwide. Gast served on the company's audit committee. John Watson, chairman of Chevron Corporation, said "Dr. Gast has tremendous technical and industry expertise that will be a valuable addition to our board discussions. We look forward to welcoming her to the board."

Gast was a member of the U.S. Manufacturing Competitiveness Initiative Steering Committee. In 2011, she joined other national leaders in Washington, D.C. for the 25th anniversary of the Council on Competitiveness, a day marked by the public release of the council's long-awaited strategy to improve American competitiveness and spur economic recovery through increased manufacturing.

In 2012, the Council on Competitiveness held a two-day conference at Lehigh University, titled "Leveraging the Talent Development Process to Drive Innovation". The conference was sponsored by the council, Lehigh, and Air Products and Chemicals.

Gast was chair of the World Economic Forum Global University Leaders' Forum (GULF) and was also a member of the advisory board for the World Economic Forum Centre for the Fourth Industrial Revolution.

=== "Science and Security in a Post 911 World" report ===
In 2006, Gast co-chaired (with Jacques Gansler, vice president for research at the University of Maryland, a non-partisan committee that produced an extensive report on "Science and Security in a Post 9/11 World: A Report Based on Regional Discussions Between the Science and Security Communities Committee on a New Government" (University Partnership for Science and Security) that was published by the National Academy of Sciences.

Gast and Gansler co-authored an op-ed in the July 11, 2008 issue of the Chronicle of Higher Education, citing a concern that the unintended effects of restrictive federal government policies on scientific research include impeding the nation's ability to be economically competitive and defend itself against potential threats.

They wrote: "It's time for researchers and intelligence officials to work together and devise policies that strike the appropriate balance between science and security. Toward that end, our committee recommends that the federal government establish a standing entity, preferably a high-level Science and Security Commission chaired by the national-security adviser and the director of the White House's Office of Science and Technology Policy."

=== Shovel-ready science? ===
In March 2009, Gast authored an op-ed that appeared in Science magazine, in which she sounded a note of caution in the way that the short-term funding for scientific research contained in the U.S. economic stimulus package will be spent.

"Transformative change requires long-term investment in the nation's intellectual infrastructure," she wrote. 'Shovel ready' makes sense for getting people to work on deferred infrastructure needs, but how does it relate to the scientific research and education programs needed to address the many challenges looming before us?"

Long-term research and education provide innovative, creative discoveries that spur transformative change, Gast noted. "The United States needs to start making the down payment on this exploration, knowing that the needed breakthroughs cannot be generated within the next two years. As science funding agencies begin awarding their one-time money, they must be mindful of the sustainability of their programs. The recent signing of the fiscal year 2009 omnibus bill with its 4.7% increase for agencies funding science and technology R&D is a welcome sign. Maintaining that momentum in the coming years will be essential."

== Controversies ==
=== Bullying of Imperial College staff ===
In 2020, Gast was involved in an investigation of alleged workplace bullying and misconduct directed at junior members of Imperial College staff. Whilst an independent investigation resulted in no action being taken against her, members of the Imperial College community and others criticized the lack of transparency in the process, with some accusing Gast and Imperial College management of repressing the findings of the report. In December 2020, she and chief financial officer Muir Sanderson admitted that they bullied staff. A bid to prevent public disclosure of the investigation of the bullying was lost, and the report confirms allegations of bullying and favourism, amongst others.

=== Chevron ===
Gast sat on the board of directors of Chevron. She faced criticism for this role, due to the perceived disconnect between the fossil fuel policies of the company and the scientific mission of Imperial College London of which she was president. Gast's involvement in Chevron has been heavily criticized by students as part of the "Divest Imperial" campaign in 2019 and 2020. The student-led campaign has the aim to divest Imperial College resources from arms, tobacco and fossil fuels, and to craft a new investment policy as a community. In protests, parts of the student body have requested that Gast either resign from her position at Chevron or that at Imperial College.

=== Pay and expenses ===
In 2018, it was reported that Gast was receiving an annual salary of £433,000. This was criticized as excessive, particularly in light of the academics' pension strike that same year. In 2020, this increased to £554,000, making her the best-paid university vice-chancellor in the UK.

Gast also came under scrutiny for claiming almost £44,000 in expenses from Imperial College London in one year.

== Personal life and death ==
Gast was married to Bradley J. Askins, a computer scientist. They had two children, Rebecca and David. Gast died from pancreatic cancer at home in Carperby, North Yorkshire, on October 27, 2025, at the age of 67.

== Awards and honors ==
In recognition of her achievements, Gast has received numerous awards and honors including the NAS Award for Initiatives in Research, the Colburn Award of the American Institute of Chemical Engineers, the Camille and Henry Dreyfus Teacher Scholar Award and a Guggenheim Fellowship. In 1998, she received the Humboldt Research Award. She was elected as a member into the National Academy of Engineering in 2001 for contributions to the understanding of the structure of complex fluids, especially polymeric and electro-rheological fluids, and to engineering education. She was also elected a member of the American Academy of Arts and Sciences in 2002. She was named an AAAS Fellow in early 2007.

In October 2008, Gast was named one of the top 100 "Modern Era" engineers in the country, under the category of "Leadership" by the American Institute of Chemical Engineers.

In 2017, she became a Fellow of the City and Guilds of London Institute.

In June 2010, Gast received an honorary degree from the University of Western Ontario at their 295th Convocation. She also has received honorary degrees from Notre Dame, the Universiti Teknologi Malaysia, and the University of Pierre and Marie Curie. In 2017, she received an honorary professorship from Tsinghua University.

In 2019, Gast was elected a Fellow of the Royal Academy of Engineering (FREng).

Academic offices
Preceded by Gregory C. Farrington	13th President of Lehigh University; 2006–2014	Succeeded by John D. Simon
Preceded by Sir Robert Keith O'Nions	President & Rector of Imperial College London; 2014–2022	Succeeded by Hugh Brady
