= Catherine Drinker Bowen =

American biographer (1897–1973)

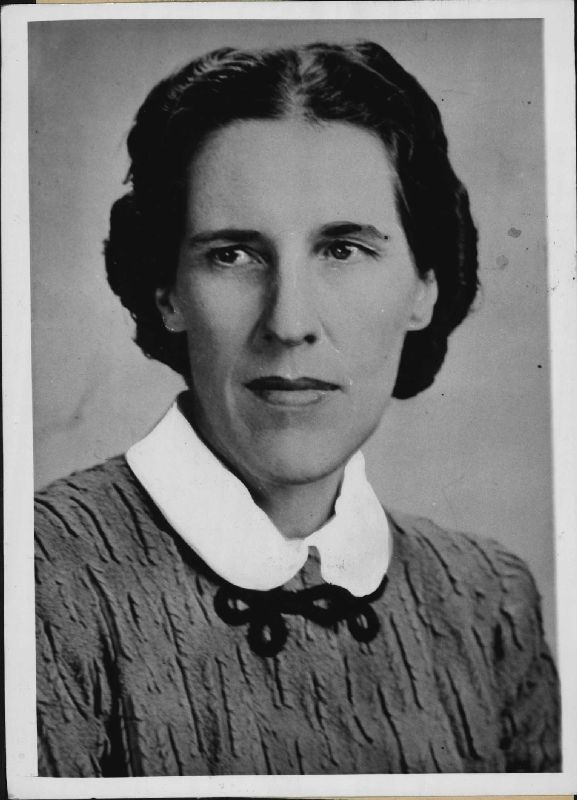
- Bowen in 1944.
- Born: Catherine Shober Drinker; January 1, 1897; Haverford, Pennsylvania, U.S.
- Died: November 1, 1973 (aged 76); Haverford, Pennsylvania, U.S.
- Burial place: West Laurel Hill Cemetery, Bala Cynwyd, Pennsylvania, U.S.
- Occupation: Writer
- Spouses: Ezra Bowen; Thomas McKean Downs
- Relatives: Henry Sturgis Drinker (father); Henry Drinker (brother); Cecil Kent Drinker (brother); Philip Drinker (brother); Catherine Ann Janvier (aunt); Cecilia Beaux (aunt)

Catherine Drinker Bowen (January 1, 1897 – November 1, 1973; née Catherine Shober Drinker) was an American biographer. She won the National Book Award for Nonfiction in 1958 for The Lion and the Throne: The Life and Times of Sir Edward Coke. She received the Women's National Book Association Award in 1962. Her biographies of John Adams, Oliver Wendell Holmes Jr., and Pyotr Ilyich Tchaikowsky were Book of the Month Club recommendations. She was the first woman to receive an honorary degree from Lehigh University.

== Early life and education ==
She was born Catherine Shober Drinker on January 1, 1897, on the Haverford College campus in Haverford, Pennsylvania, to Aimee Ernesta (Beaux) and Henry Sturgis Drinker. In 1905, she moved with her family to Bethlehem, Pennsylvania, where her father was president of Lehigh University. She was tutored by local teachers and members of the Lehigh faculty. She attended Miss Kellogg's dame school and the Moravian Academy from 1907 to 1908. From ages 11 to 18, she traveled frequently with her family due to her father's interest in engineering projects, including the Panama Canal and Suez Canal. She attended St. Timothy's School in Catonsville, Maryland, from 1914 to 1916.

She was a violinist who studied music at the Peabody Institute and received a teaching certificate from the Institute of Musical Art, now known as the Juilliard School of Music. She performed in amateur string quartets and taught music to students in private lessons.

== Career ==
She began her writing career by winning a ten dollar prize in a writing competition sponsored by the Easton Times newspaper in Easton, Pennsylvania. She sold some of her stories and wrote a daily column for the Easton Times. She wrote articles for magazines including Good Housekeeping, Pictorial Review, and Woman's Home Companion. She published two books in 1924, a children's book, The Story of an Oak Tree, and The History of Lehigh Valley, although she did not claim credit for these publications until 1951. In 1932, she released her only novel, Rufus Starbuck's Wife, and a collection of essays Friends and Fiddlers, in 1935.

Her early biography work focused on musicians including Beloved Friend: The Story of Tchaikowsky and Nadejda von Meck published in 1937 and Free Artist: The Story of Anton and Nicholas Rubinstein in 1939. Her work intermingled historical information gleaned from the subjects' correspondence with strong character development and narrative.

Bowen next focused on biographies of legal experts and their role in the development of the American democracy. She published a biography on Oliver Wendell Holmes Jr., Yankee from Olympus: Justice Holmes and His Family in 1944 and another on John Adams, John Adams and the American Revolution in 1950. She published Miracle at Philadelphia: The Story of the Constitutional Convention in 1966, which recounted the Philadelphia Convention in 1787 that created the Constitution of the United States.

Three of Bowen's books were chosen as Book of the Month Club selections: Beloved Friend (1937), Yankee from Olympus (1944) and John Adams and the American Revolution (1950). In 1957, Bowen received the Phillips Prize from the American Philosophical Society for "best essay... on the science and philosophy of jurisprudence". In 1958, she won the National Book Award for Nonfiction for The Lion and the Throne: The Life and Times of Sir Edward Coke. That same year, she was elected to the American Philosophical Society. She received the 1962 Women's National Book Association award. Her last book, Family Portrait, received critical acclaim, and was a Literary Guild selection. She received the Philadelphia Award, and in 1962, she was the first woman to receive an honorary degree from Lehigh University.

Bowen was an amateur chamber music player, often playing violin with members of her family and with friends. She documented her experiences playing chamber music in her book Friends and Fiddlers. She was one of the founding members of the Amateur Chamber Music Players (now known as the Associated Chamber Music Players), an international organization encouraging amateur music-making.

At the time of Bowen's death in 1973, she was working on a biography of Benjamin Franklin; the unfinished book was published posthumously as The Most Dangerous Man in America: Scenes from the Life of Benjamin Franklin. She died on November 1, 1973, at her home in Haverford from cancer and was interred at West Laurel Hill Cemetery in Bala Cynwyd, Pennsylvania.

== Personal life ==
She had four brothers, Henry Drinker, an attorney who lent his name to the large Philadelphia-based law firm Drinker Biddle & Reath, and who was also a chamber music composer and conductor; Jim; Cecil Kent Drinker, the founder of the Harvard School of Public Health; and Philip Drinker, inventor of the iron lung; and a sister, Ernesta. Catherine's aunt on her father's side was artist Catherine Ann Janvier and on her mother's side noted portraitist Cecilia Beaux.

She married Ezra Bowen, the Chair of Economics at Lehigh University and the author of Social Economics on March 19, 1919. They divorced in the 1930s. Catherine married her second husband, Thomas McKean Downs, a surgeon, in 1939. She had two children from her first marriage: Catherine Prince and Ezra Bowen. Ezra went on to become a writer and editor for Sports Illustrated and Time Life. Of her two biological grandsons, Ezra Drinker, the eldest, established an international business career and three grand-daughters; Matthew is an author of creative non-fiction, stage / screenplays, and scholarly articles in neuropsychology.

== Legacy ==
A historical marker in Bethlehem, Pennsylvania highlights her accomplishments and where she lived during her father's presidency of Lehigh University.

== Selected works ==
- The Story of the Oak Tree (Easton, PA: Chemical Publishing Co., 1924)
- A History of Lehigh University (South Bethlehem, PA: Lehigh Alumni Bulletin, 1924)
- Rufus Starbuck's Wife (New York: Putnam, 1932)
- Friends and Fiddlers (Boston: Little, Brown and Company, 1935)
- Beloved Friend: The Story of Tchaikowsky and Nadejda Von Meck (New York: Random House, 1937)
- Free artist: The story of Anton and Nicholas Rubinstein (New York: Random House, 1939)
- Yankee from Olympus: Justice Holmes and His Family (Boston: Little, Brown and Company, 1944)
- John Adams and the American Revolution (Boston: Little, Brown and Company, 1950)
- The writing of biography (Boston: 1951)
- The Lion and the Throne: The Life and Times of Sir Edward Coke (Boston: Little, Brown and Company, 1957)
- Lord of the Law (New York: American Heritage Publishing Co., 1957)
- Adventures of a Biographer (Boston: Little, Brown and Company, 1959)
- Bernard DeVoto: Historian, critic, and fighter (Boston: Little Brown and Company, 1960)
- Francis Bacon: The Temper of a Man (Boston: Little, Brown and Company, 1963)
- Miracle at Philadelphia: The Story of the Constitutional Convention, May to September 1787 (Boston: Little, Brown and Company, 1966)
- Biography: The Craft and the Calling (Boston: Little, Brown and Company, 1968)
- Family Portrait (Boston: Little, Brown and Company, 1970)
- The Most Dangerous Man in America: Scenes from the Life of Benjamin Franklin (Boston: Little, Brown, and Company, 1974)
