= Adella Turner =

American social activist (1856–1938)

Adella Kelsey Turner
- Born: January 13, 1856; Marshall, Texas, United States
- Died: June 6, 1938 (aged 82); Dallas, Texas, United States
- Occupation: Social activist

Adella Kelsey Turner (January 13, 1856 – June 6, 1938) was an American social activist, who was active in many women’s organizations in Texas throughout her lifetime.

== Background ==
Turner was born in Marshall, Texas, to William and Sarah Kelsey, on January 13, 1856. She had one older brother, Alonzo. They lost their father in 1858 and their mother in 1860. They were taken in by their mother’s brother, P. A. Patillo in Marshall. By 1870, the children were under the watch of Gustave Frank and his family. Adella stayed with the Franks until she was married on June 5, 1879. She met Edward Turner, a manager of a Texas and Pacific Railway Company ticket office at various social events in Jefferson, Texas. They had four children, Karl, Waldso, Ralph, and Edward, Jr. Karl and Ralph died during childhood, but Waldo and Edward, Jr. survived or reached to adulthood. Adela Kelsey Turner died June 6, 1938, in Dallas, Texas. Her two living sons donated the Turner home to the Oak Cliff Society of Fine Arts, but it was sold due to the construction of Interstate 35.

== Women’s organizations ==
Adella Kelsey Turner began her participation in women’s organizations by joining the Standard Club of Dallas. She quickly became known as a leader. She assisted with the formation of the Texas Federation of Women's Clubs and was elected president. She had originally joined the clubs for her literary and musical interest, but she soon began working to better Oak Cliff, a southern section of Dallas, Texas. In 1900, she became the First Vice-President of the Standard Club. She also became Treasurer for the Women’s Alliance. By 1902, she was President of the Standard Club, which soon became united with the National Federation of Women’s Clubs. In 1903, she was elected to the President’s chair of the City Federation of Women’s Clubs. In 1904, she was elected President of the Texas Federation of Women’s Clubs. This was the first time she had held a position at the state level. In 1906, she began to organize the Dallas Woman’s Forum. In 1908, Turner ran for the Dallas School Board. Turner and Mrs. P.P. Tucker were elected to the board, with the support of the Dallas Morning News, the Congress of Mothers, the City Federation of Women’s Clubs, and the Dallas Woman’s Forum. Turner wanted the betterment for white children’s schools, but also for colored children’s schools. While on the Dallas School Board, Mrs. Turner toured the College of Industrial Arts in Denton, Texas, which is now called Texas Woman’s University. She was elected to Presidency for the Dallas Woman’s Forum in 1910. In 1919, she stepped down. She was reelected President of the City Federation of Women’s Clubs. By 1920, the membership of the City Federation had grown to 1,000 women, and Turner stepped down to Parliamentarian. Turner then became active in the Women’s Good Citizenship Association. It later dissipated and reformed as the Dallas League of Women Voters. Turner was president of the Oak Cliff Society of Fine Arts from 1926 until her death. She was an inspirational woman who pursued her dreams of bettering the city and creating a better society.

=== The Dallas Woman’s Forum ===
The Dallas Woman’s Forum became official on March 20, 1906. Adele Turner was elected President of the nine department group. The Forum supported nine departments: Art, Bible and Sacred History, Literature and Music, Current Events, Civics and Philanthropy, Philosophy and Science, Household Economics and Pure Food, Home Industry, and Congress of Mothers. The Congress of Mothers department was split between the Home Section and the School Section. The Forum was said to have unity to stay together, but diversity to prevent repetitiveness. The group put emphasis on education and improvement of living conditions for children and women. After two years as President, Turner stepped down. While Turner was away, efforts focused on social events and fund-raising. In 1910, Turner was elected President again. She reinstated the efforts that had dwindled in her absence as well as adding the Public Welfare department. In 1912, the Social Service department was added. Around World War I, Turner aimed the Forum’s efforts to support the war. After World War I ended, with an estimated four-hundred count membership, the Dallas Woman’s Forum was once again aimed to Women's suffrage. Turner stepped down again in 1919.
