= Miracle at Philadelphia =

1966 book by Catherine Drinker Bowen

Miracle at Philadelphia: The Story of the Constitutional Convention
- Book cover of the 1986 edition
- Author: Catherine Drinker Bowen
- Language: English
- Publisher: Little, Brown
- Publication date: 1966
- Publication place: United States
- Media type: Print
- Pages: 346p. (1986 edition)

Miracle at Philadelphia: The Story of the Constitutional Convention is a work of historical non-fiction, written by Catherine Drinker Bowen and originally published in 1966. Bowen recounts the Philadelphia Convention, a meeting in 1787 that created the United States Constitution. Bowen draws much of her information from notes and journals of the Framers, especially James Madison. It contains vivid description of many founders including George Washington, Benjamin Franklin, James Madison, Alexander Hamilton, George Mason, and Gouverneur Morris, important compromises such as the Great Compromise, and controversial issues such as slavery.

== Background and publication ==
The book was published by Little, Brown and Company in 1966. The audiobook was published by Blackstone Audio in 1995, narrated by Kristen Underwood.

== Reception and legacy ==
Miracle at Philadelphia received positive reviews, including being described by Christianity Today as a "riveting, nuanced account". It was used frequently in high school and college courses on American history.
