= Halowax =

Halowax is a New York-based company that was later owned by Union Carbide. It was subsequently taken over by Pittsburgh, Pennsylvania-based Koppers, which was later renamed Beazer East. It was the largest US producer of polychlorinated naphthalenes and polychlorinated biphenyls for floor finishing and similar applications.
