= Gregory C. Farrington =

American academic administrator

Gregory C. Farrington is an American academic administrator. He is the executive director of the California Academy of Sciences in San Francisco. Prior to his appointment to this position in 2007, Farrington served as the 12th President of Lehigh University, and prior to his move to Lehigh in 1998 he served as Dean of the School of Engineering and Applied Science at the University of Pennsylvania.

Farrington earned a B.S. in chemistry from Clarkson University in 1968 and a Ph.D. in chemistry from Harvard University in 1972. In 1984 Farrington received an honorary doctorate from the Faculty of Mathematics and Science at Uppsala University, Sweden. Farrington has published more than 100 technical articles and holds over two dozen patents.

As President of Lehigh, Farrington oversaw the construction of the apartments and shops at Campus Square and the multimillion-dollar renovation of Linderman Library. His successor at Lehigh has been Alice P. Gast, formerly of MIT.

Preceded by William C. Hittinger	12th President of Lehigh University; 1998–2006	Succeeded by Alice Gast
