= Carol K. Hall =

American chemical engineer

- Education: Stony Brook University (PhD); Cornell University (BA)
- Scientific career
- Fields: Physical Chemistry; Chemical Engineering; Soft Matter; Biophysics
- Workplaces: North Carolina State University; Princeton University
- Doctoral advisor: George Stell
- Website: https://carolkhall.wordpress.ncsu.edu/

Carol Klein Hall is an American chemical engineer, the Camille Dreyfus Distinguished University Professor of Chemical and Biomolecular Engineering at North Carolina State University. Her research involves biomolecule simulation, self-assembly of soft materials, and the design of synthetic peptides.

== Education and career ==
Hall majored in physics at Cornell University, graduating in 1967. She completed her doctorate in physics in 1972 at Stony Brook University, under the supervision of George Stell.

After postdoctoral research at Cornell, and a brief stint as a researcher in corporate economics at Bell Labs, she joined the chemical engineering faculty at Princeton University in 1977, and moved to North Carolina State University in 1985. She was one of the first women to be appointed to a chemical engineering faculty in the United States.

== Recognition ==
In 2005, Hall was elected a member of the National Academy of Engineering "for applications of modern thermodynamic and computer-simulation methods to chemical engineering problems involving macromolecules and complex fluids". She currently serves as Home Secretary for National Academy of Engineering. She became a fellow of the American Physical Society in 2007, "for creating a new paradigm to simulate protein aggregation through a combination of intermediate-resolution molecular models and the discontinuous molecular dynamics method". She is also a fellow of the American Institute of Chemical Engineers (AIChE). In 2019, she was elected as fellow of American Association for the Advancement of Science for her "contributions to the field of thermodynamics using statistical methods and computer simulation methods to solve engineering problems involving macromolecules and complex fluids."

In 2015, she won the FOMMS Medal, given triennially at the Conference on Foundations of Molecular Modeling and Simulation (FOMMS) for "profound and lasting contributions by one or more individuals to the development of computational methods and their application to the field of molecular-based modeling and simulation". In the same year the American Institute of Chemical Engineers gave her their Founders Award for Outstanding Contributions to the Field of Chemical Engineering.

Hall was appointed as a Camille Dreyfus Distinguished University Professor in 2005. In 2008, she listed by AIChE as "One Hundred Engineers of the Modern Era”. In 2015, she received the Foundations of Molecular Modeling and Simulation (FOMMS) Medal, to honor "profound and lasting contribution by one or more individuals to the development of computational methods and their application to the field of molecular-based modeling and simulation". Also in 2015, she received the AIChE Founders award. In 2020, she received the AIChE Institute Margaret H. Rousseau Pioneer Award for Lifetime Achievement by a Woman Chemical Engineer.
