= Katherine Rotan Drinker =

American physician and occupational hygiene expert (1888-1956)

- Born: January 12, 1888; Waco, Texas, U.S.
- Died: March 15, 1956 (aged 68); Cataumet, Massachusetts, U.S.
- Resting place: West Laurel Hill Cemetery, Bala Cynwyd, Pennsylvania, U.S.
- Education: Bryn Mawr College; Women's Medical College of Pennsylvania
- Spouse: Cecil Kent Drinker
- Relatives: Kate Rotan (mother)
- Medical career
- Profession: Physician, occupational hygienist, professor
- Institutions: Harvard School of Public Health

Katherine Rotan Drinker (January 12, 1888 – March 15, 1956) was an American physician, educator, and occupational hygiene expert with the Harvard School of Public Health. She was co-editor of the Journal of Industrial Hygiene. She and her husband, Cecil Kent Drinker, studied the industrial poisoning of the Radium Girls at the United States Radium Corporation which advanced the field of occupational hygiene and improved worker health.

== Early life and education ==
She was born Katherine Rotan in Waco, Texas, on January 12, 1888, to Kate Rotan and Edward Rotan. She was one of nine children.

She graduated from Bryn Mawr College in 1910 and received her medical degree from the Woman's Medical College of Pennsylvania in 1914.

== Career ==
In 1916, Drinker joined the Harvard University School of Public Health. She lectured and published textbooks on medicine. She and her husband conducted research on the impact of industrial dust and fumes on workers. While other occupational hygiene researchers focused on direct examination of the workplace and workers, the Drinkers conducted controlled laboratory tests of chemical exposure using animals and dissection and analysis of tissues.

In the early 1920s, the United States Radium Corporation asked the Drinkers to examine the Orange, New Jersey, factory to determine why several employees had fallen ill. They discovered an environment saturated with radium contaminated dust with no protection for workers from the radioactive material. The workers used radium infused paint for clock faces that would glow in the dark. The workers were told it was safe to use the paint and encouraged to lick the radium paint brushes in order to create a fine point. The workers suffered radiation poisoning including a painful condition known as radium jaw. These workers who suffered from industrial poisoning became known as the Radium Girls.

The Drinkers were convinced that the employees' continuous exposure to radium was causing health problems. The company president, Arthur Roeder, disagreed and blamed the health problems on an infection outside of the factory. Roeder threatened to sue when he found out that they planned to publish the findings and the Drinkers acquiesced. A Harvard School of Public Health colleague, Alice Hamilton, learned that the United States Radium Corporation had submitted the Drinker's report to the New Jersey Department of Labor with the results altered to show the company in a better light. With this evidence that Roeder had acted in bad faith, the Drinkers ignored the threat of lawsuit and published the unaltered report.

After receiving the full report from the Drinkers, the New Jersey labor commissioner declared that all the recommended safety measures be put in place which prompted the factory to close. After the workers sued the company, major industry safety improvements were put in place and radium-based paint was banned in the 1960s.

She was co-editor of the Journal of Industrial Hygiene along with her husband.

Drinker died on March 15, 1956, in Cataumet, Massachusetts, at the age of 66 from leukemia. She was interred at West Laurel Hill Cemetery in Bala Cynwyd, Pennsylvania.

== Personal life ==
In 1910, Drinker married Cecil Kent Drinker, a fellow physician and dean of the Harvard School of Public Health. They had a daughter, Anne Sandwith Zinsser, and a son, Cecil K. Drinker, Jr.

== Additional reading ==
- "Katherine Rotan Drinker, 1889-1956 and Cecil Kent Drinker, 1887-1956". A.M.A. Archives of Industrial Health. 15 (1): 74–5. 1957. PMID 13393814.
