= Radium Girls =

American female radiation poisoning victims (1917–1978)

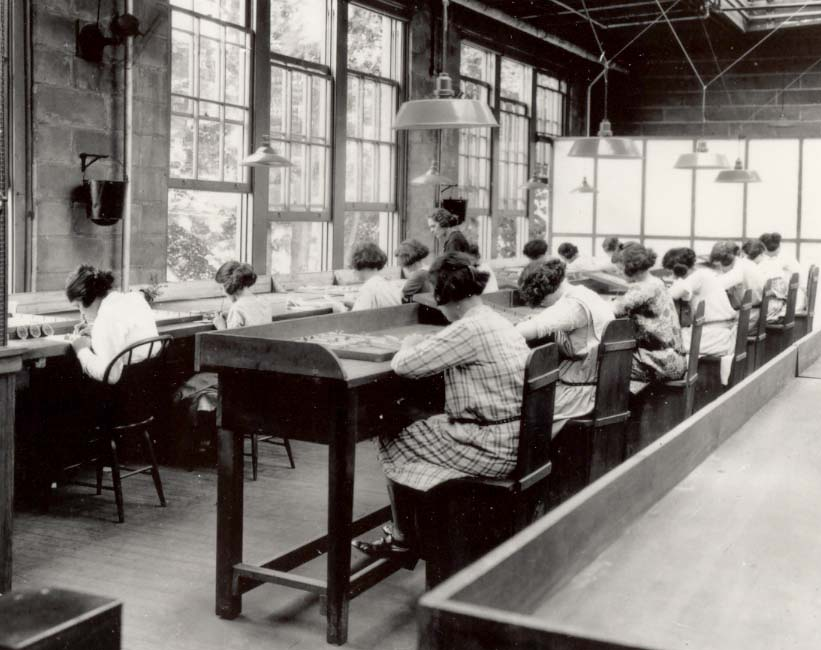
Radium painters working in a factory

The Radium Girls were female factory workers who contracted radiation poisoning from painting radium dials – watch dials and hands with self-luminous paint. The incidents occurred at three factories in the United States: one in Orange, New Jersey, beginning around 1917; one in Ottawa, Illinois, beginning in the early 1920s; and one in Waterbury, Connecticut, also in the 1920s.

After being told that the paint was harmless, the women in each facility ingested deadly amounts of radium after being instructed to "point" their brushes on their lips in order to give them a fine tip. The women were instructed to point their brushes in this way because using rags or a water rinse caused them to use more time and material; the paint was made from powdered radium, zinc sulfide (a phosphor), gum arabic, and water.

The Radium Girls had lasting effects on the labor laws in the United States and Europe due to numerous lawsuits filed after worker deaths and illnesses caused by ingestion of radium.

== United States Radium Corporation ==
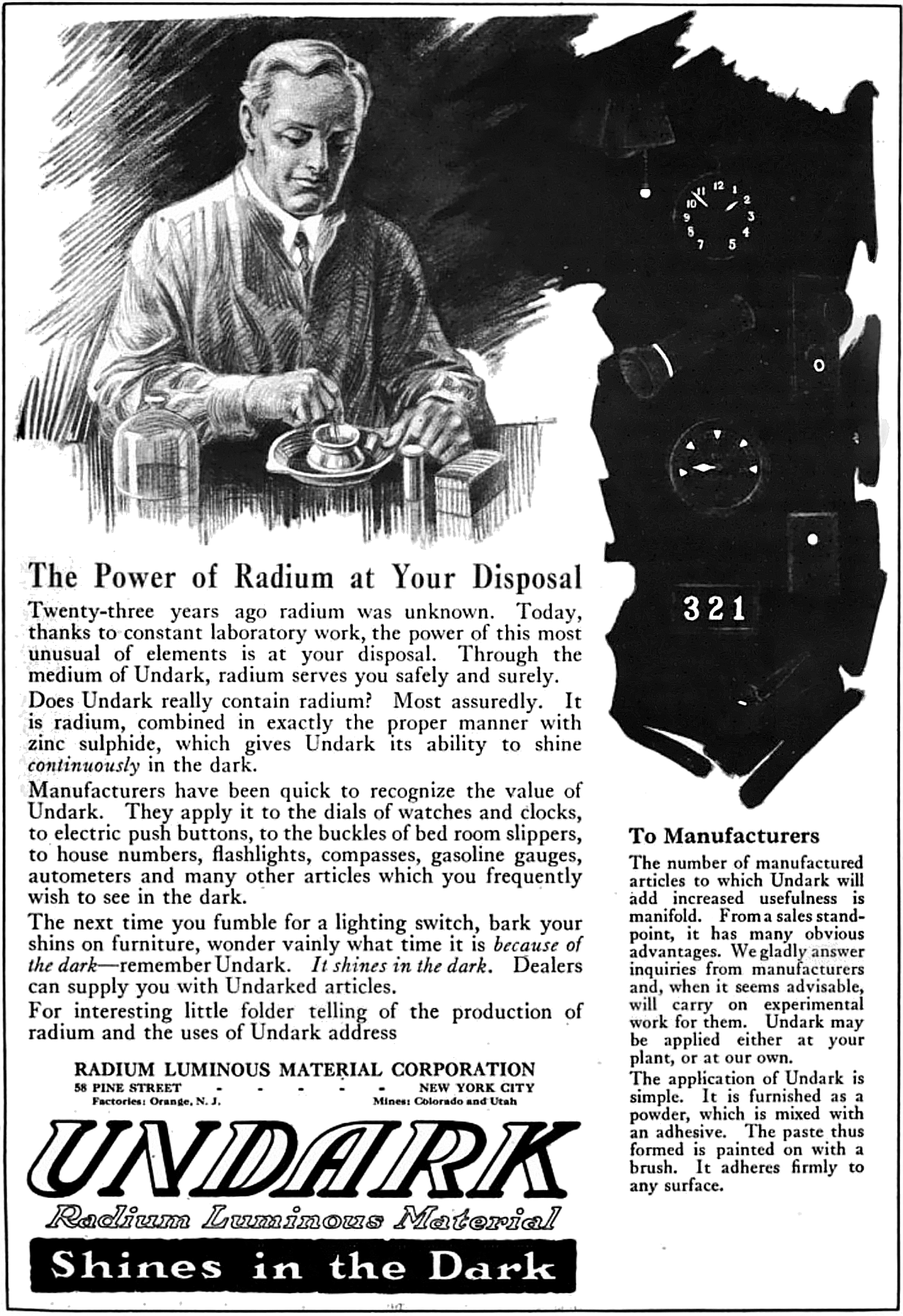
1921 advertisement for Undark

From 1917 to 1926, the United States Radium Corporation (USRC), originally called the Radium Luminous Material Corporation, was engaged in the extraction and purification of radium from carnotite ore to produce luminous paints, which were marketed under the brand name "Undark". The ore was mined from the Paradox Valley in Colorado and other "Undark mines" in Utah. As a defense contractor, USRC was a major supplier of radioluminescent watches to the military. Their plant in Orange, New Jersey, employed as many as 300 workers, mainly women, to paint radium-lit watch faces and instruments, misleading them by claiming that it was safe.

=== Radiation exposure ===
USRC hired approximately 70 women to perform various tasks including handling radium, while the owners and the scientists familiar with the effects of radium carefully avoided any exposure to it themselves. Chemists at the plant used lead screens, tongs, and masks. USRC had distributed literature to the medical community describing the "injurious effects" of radium. Despite this knowledge, a number of similar deaths had occurred by 1925, including USRC's chief chemist, Dr. Edwin E. Leman and several female workers. The similar circumstances of their deaths prompted investigations by Dr. Harrison Martland, county physician of Newark.

An estimated 4,000 workers were hired by corporations in the U.S. and Canada to paint watch faces with radium. At USRC, each of the painters mixed her own paint in a small crucible, and then used camel hair brushes to apply the glowing paint onto dials. The rate of pay was about a penny and a half per dial (equivalent to $0.377 in 2025), earning the women $3.75 (equivalent to $94.24 in 2025) for painting 250 dials per shift.

The brushes would lose shape after a few strokes, so the USRC supervisors encouraged their workers to shape the brushes' point with their lips ("lip, dip, paint") or use their tongues to keep them sharp. Because the true nature of the radium had been kept from them, the Radium Girls also painted their nails, teeth, and faces for fun with the deadly paint produced at the factory. By 1927, more than 50 of the female factory workers had died from radium poisoning caused by the paint used. Several are buried in Orange's Rosedale Cemetery.

A 1951 Life magazine photo essay first brought the story of U.S. Radium's 1920s dial painters to public attention. It highlighted the recent (1949) death of Florence Kohler Casler from sinus cancer; she had joined the USRC in 1917.

=== Radiation poisoning ===
Dentists were among the first to see numerous problems among dial painters, including dental pain, loose teeth, lesions, and ulcers, as well as the failure of tooth extractions to heal. Many of the women developed anemia, bone fractures, and necrosis of the jaw, a condition now known as radium jaw. The women also experienced sterility and suppression of menstruation.

Although there were claims that the above conditions were caused by X-rays the women received to investigate their health problems, the amount of radiation absorbed would be inconsequential compared to the amount they were exposed to daily at radium dial factories. As the factory workers' health deteriorated they sought medical attention for problems ranging from dental problems to cancer. Columbia University specialist Frederick Flynn was an industrial toxicologist in contract with the USRC. Flynn and many other doctors referred to the patients lacked medical training and licenses to practice. It turned out that at least one of the examinations was a ruse, part of a campaign of disinformation started by the defense contractor. USRC and other watch-dial companies rejected claims that the affected workers were suffering from exposure to radium. For some time, doctors, dentists, and researchers complied with requests from the companies not to release their data. In 1923, the first dial painter died and, before her death, her jaw fell away from her skull. By 1924, 50 women who had worked at the plant were ill, and a dozen had died.

In the early 1920s, the United States Radium Corporation contacted Cecil Kent Drinker and his wife, Katherine Rotan Drinker, from the Harvard School of Public Health to examine the Orange, New Jersey, factory to determine why several employees had fallen ill. They discovered an environment saturated with radium contaminated dust with no protection for workers from the radioactive material.

Drinker was convinced that the employees' continuous exposure to radium was causing health problems. The company president, Arthur Roeder, disagreed and blamed the health problems on an infection outside of the factory. At the urging of the company, medical professionals attributed worker deaths to other causes. Syphilis, a notorious sexually transmitted infection at the time, was often cited in attempts to smear the reputations of the women. The company also claimed that they had hired "a great many people who were physically unfit to procure employment in other lines of industry" as an act of kindness.

Roeder threatened to sue when he found out that Drinker planned to publish his findings and Drinker acquiesced. A Harvard School of Public Health colleague, Alice Hamilton, learned that the United States Radium Corporation had submitted Drinker's report to the New Jersey Department of Labor with the results altered to show the company in a better light. With this evidence that Roeder had acted in bad faith, Drinker ignored the threat of lawsuit and published his unaltered report.

After receiving the full report from Drinker, the New Jersey labor commissioner declared that all the recommended safety measures be put in place, which prompted the factory to close. After the workers sued the company, major industry safety improvements were put in place and radium-based paint was banned in the 1960s.

The inventor of radium dial paint, Dr. Sabin Arnold von Sochocky, died in November 1928, becoming the 16th known victim of poisoning by radium dial paint. He had gotten sick from radium in his hands, not the jaw, but the circumstances of his death helped the Radium Girls in court.

== Radium Dial Company ==
The Radium Dial Company was established in Ottawa, Illinois, in 1922. Like the United States Radium Corporation, the purpose of the studio in Ottawa was to paint dials for clocks, their largest client being Westclox Corporation in Peru, Illinois. Dials painted in Ottawa appeared on Westclox's popular Big Ben, Baby Ben, and travel clocks; and the Radium Dial Corporation hired young women to paint the dials, using the same "lip, dip, paint" approach as the women in New Jersey (also used in another unaffiliated plant in Waterbury, Connecticut, that supplied the Waterbury Clock Company).

Following the termination of President Joseph Kelly from the company, Kelly established a competing firm in the town named Luminous Process Company, which also employed women in the same fashion and in the same conditions as the other firms. Employees at Radium Dial began showing signs of radium poisoning in 1926 and 1927 and were unaware of the hearings and trials in New Jersey. Furthermore, Radium Dial leadership authorized physicals and other tests designed to determine the toxicity of radium paint to its employees, but the company did not make the records or results available to employees.

In an attempt to end the use of the camel hair brushes, management introduced glass pens with a fine point; however, the workers found that the pens slowed their productivity, and as they were paid by the piece they reverted to using brushes. When word of the New Jersey women and their suits appeared in local newspapers, the women were told that the radium was safe and that employees in New Jersey were showing signs of viral infections. The co-founder of the Radium Luminous Materials Corporation (RLMC), George Willis, lectured the women on the supposed safety of radium. Radium was also advertised to women of the time as a cure-all and an ingredient in several cosmetic product brands including "Artes", "Ramey", "Radior" and "Tho-Radia". The cosmetic products containing radium promised regenerative anti-aging properties for a youthful appearance. Dr. von Sochocky told workers that the paint lacked hazardous ingredients. They were also told the radium in the paint was being diluted and could not harm their health. Assured by their employers that the radium was safe, they returned to work as usual.

Radium paint was still used in dials as late as the 1970s; the last factory manufacturing radium paint, operated by Luminous Processes Inc., shut down in 1978.

== Significance ==
=== Litigation ===
In Orange, New Jersey, the story of the abuse perpetrated against the workers is distinguished from similar cases because ensuing litigation was covered widely by the media. To explain why the women were unable to appear in court, their attorney said: "When you have heard that you are going to die, that there is no hope — and every newspaper you pick up prints what really amounts to your obituary — there is nothing else." Plant worker Grace Fryer decided to sue, but it took two years for her to find a lawyer willing to take on USRC. The litigation moved slowly even after the women found a lawyer, and by the time of their first court appearance in January 1928, two women were bedridden and none of them could raise their arms to take an oath.

The five factory workers involved in the suit were dubbed "the Radium Girls" – Fryer, Edna Hussman, Katherine Schaub, Quinta McDonald, and Albina Larice. USRC denied any wrongdoing, but the case was settled in the autumn of 1928 before the trial was deliberated by the jury. The settlement for each of the Radium Girls was $10,000 (equivalent to $188,000 in 2025) and a $600 per year annuity (equivalent to $11,300 in 2025) paid $12 per week (equivalent to $200 in 2025) for all of their lives, and all medical and legal expenses incurred would also be paid by the company. All five of the women were dead by the 1930s.

In Illinois, employees began asking for compensation for their medical and dental bills as early as 1927 but were refused by management. The demand for money by sick and dying former employees continued into the mid-1930s before a suit was brought before the Illinois Industrial Commission (IIC). In 1937, five women secured attorney Leonard Grossman to represent them in front of the commission. Grossman took the case without receiving pay because the women were unable to work and therefore indigent. The case was handled at the home of Catherine Donohue, a woman who was involved but was too sick to travel. In the spring of 1938, the IIC ruled in favor of the women, but by then, Radium Dial had closed and moved to New York, and the IIC refused to cross state boundaries for the women's payout. The IIC did retain a $10,000 deposit left by Radium Dial when it disclosed to the IIC that they could not find insurance to cover the cost of indemnifying the company against employee suits. The attorney representing the interests of Radium Dial appealed hoping to get the verdict overturned. Radium Dial appealed to the U.S. Supreme Court, and on October 23, 1939, the court decided not to hear the appeal, and the lower ruling was upheld. Some of the women received no payout, and by the time the matter was officially settled by the Supreme Court, Donohue was dead.

=== Historical impact ===
The Radium Girls' saga holds an important place in the history of the fields of health physics, women's rights, and the labor rights movement. The right of individual workers to sue for damages from corporations due to labor abuse was established, and labor safety standards, like the baseline called provable suffering, were created. Industrial standards for safety improved as a result, and in 1949, Congress passed a bill that decreed compensation for all workers suffering from occupational diseases.

The lawsuit and resulting publicity was a factor in the establishment of occupational disease labor law. After the litigation, Radium Dial painters were instructed in proper safety precautions and provided with protective gear; in particular, they no longer shaped paint brushes by lip and avoided ingesting or breathing the paint.

Mabel Williams, who died on July 23, 2015 at age 104, was among the last surviving Radium Girls, having worked as a painter at Radium Dial. She was described as having no complications from working with radium paint, which she attributed to never "tipping" her paint brush with her lips. Williams said she "didn't think that was a good idea."

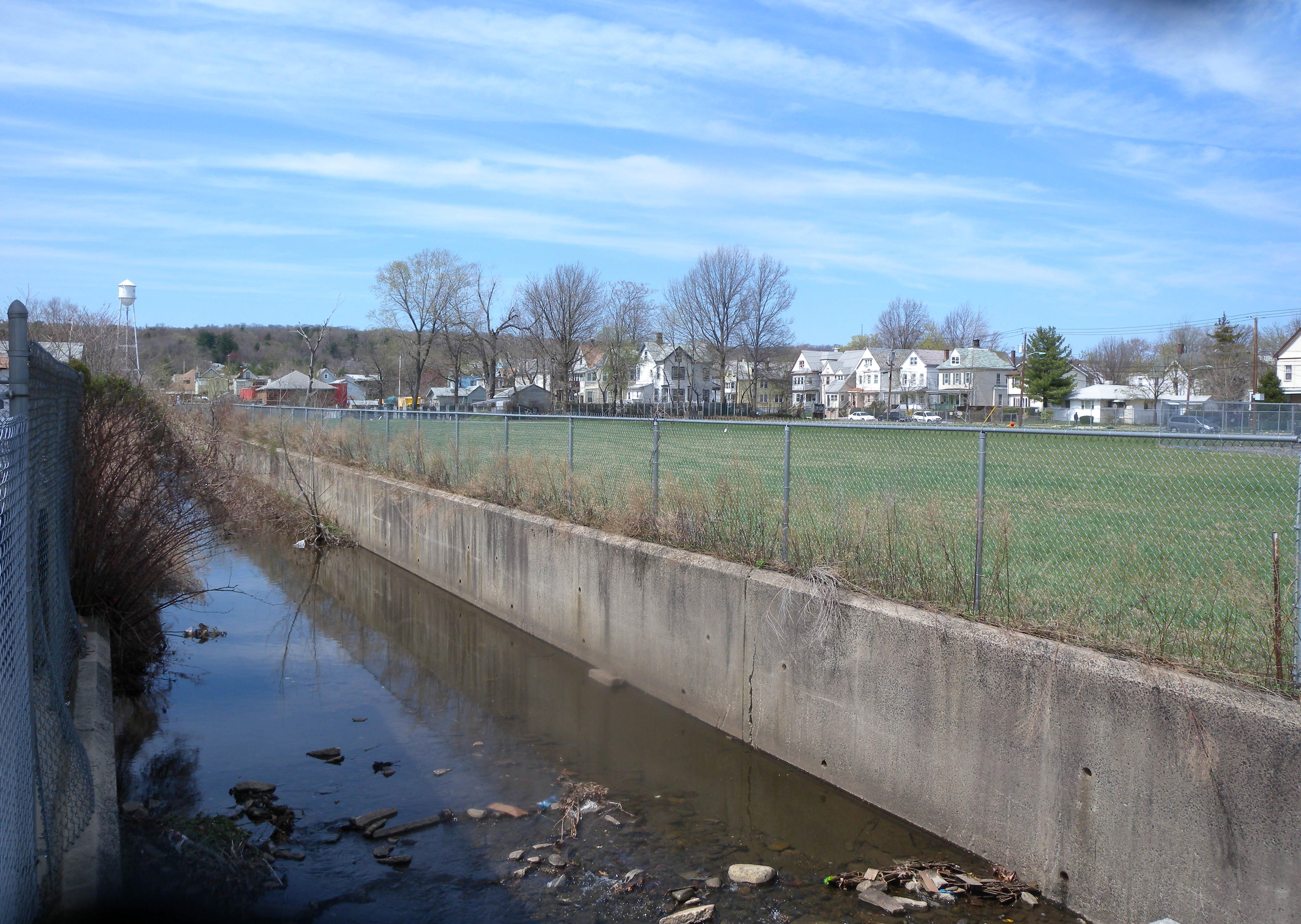
The former factory site in West Orange, New Jersey

=== Scientific impact ===
Robley D. Evans made the first measurements of exhaled radon and radium excretion from a former dial painter in 1933. At the Massachusetts Institute of Technology, he gathered dependable body content measurements from 27 dial painters. This information was used in 1941 by the National Bureau of Standards to establish a tolerance level for radium at 0.1 μCi (3.7 kBq).

The Center for Human Radiobiology was established at Argonne National Laboratory in 1968. The primary purpose of the center was to provide medical examinations for surviving dial painters. The project also focused on the collection of information and, in some cases, tissue samples from the painters. When the project ended in 1993, detailed information of 2,403 cases had been collected.

The project led to a book about the effects of radium on humans. The book suggests that radium-228 exposure is more harmful to health than exposure to radium-226. Radium-228 is more likely to cause cancer of the bone as the shorter half-life of radon-220 compared with radon-222 causes the daughter nuclides of radium-228 to deliver a greater dose of alpha radiation to the bones. It also considers the induction of several forms of cancer caused by internal exposure to radium and its daughter nuclides. The book used data from Radium Dial painters, people who were exposed as a result of the use of radium-containing medical products, and other groups of people who had been exposed to radium.

=== In literature, music, and film ===
- A fictionalized version of the story was featured in the 1937 short story "Letter to the Editor" by James H. Street, adapted into the 1937 film Nothing Sacred and the 1953 Broadway musical Hazel Flagg.
- Radium City is a documentary directed by Carole Langer, released in 1987.
- D. W. Gregory wrote a play titled Radium Girls that follows Grace Fryer and the lawsuit in New Jersey. It was published by Dramatists Play Service in 2000.
- In 2017, Kate Moore published The Radium Girls: The Dark Story of America's Shining Women, a narrative account of the women.
- Radium Girls is a film starring Joey King, released in October 2020.
- Catherine Donohue's story was dramatized in the 2010 play These Shining Lives by Melanie Marnich, published by Dramatists Play Service.
- The song Radium Girls by Tom Morello featuring The Bloody Beetroots, Pussy Riot, The Last Internationale, Aimee Interrupter, and White Lung was released June 4, 2021 by label Comandante LLC.
- In 2024, ESMA Movies produced The Fireflies, a French-made English language animated short film inspired by the case of the Radium Girls.
- As of 2026, a stage musical titled The Radium Girls, directed by Marissa Jaret Winokur and written by Amanda D'Archangelis, Sami Horneff, and Lisa Mongillo, is aiming for a Broadway run.
- Australian punk rock group Radium Dolls took their name in reference to this incident.

== See also ==
- Occupational disease
- Phossy jaw
- Breaker boy
- Kent (cigarette), a brand of cigarettes with asbestos filters said to reduce cancer risk, but which in fact caused mesothelioma, a type of cancer caused by asbestos exposure
- Nuclear labor issues
- Labor history
- Labor law
- Labor rights
- Katherine Rotan Drinker and Cecil Kent Drinker, physicians who researched the Radium Girls
- Hiroshima Maidens
- Radioactive contamination
- Radium silk
- Tritium radioluminescence
