= Kate Rotan =

American civic activist

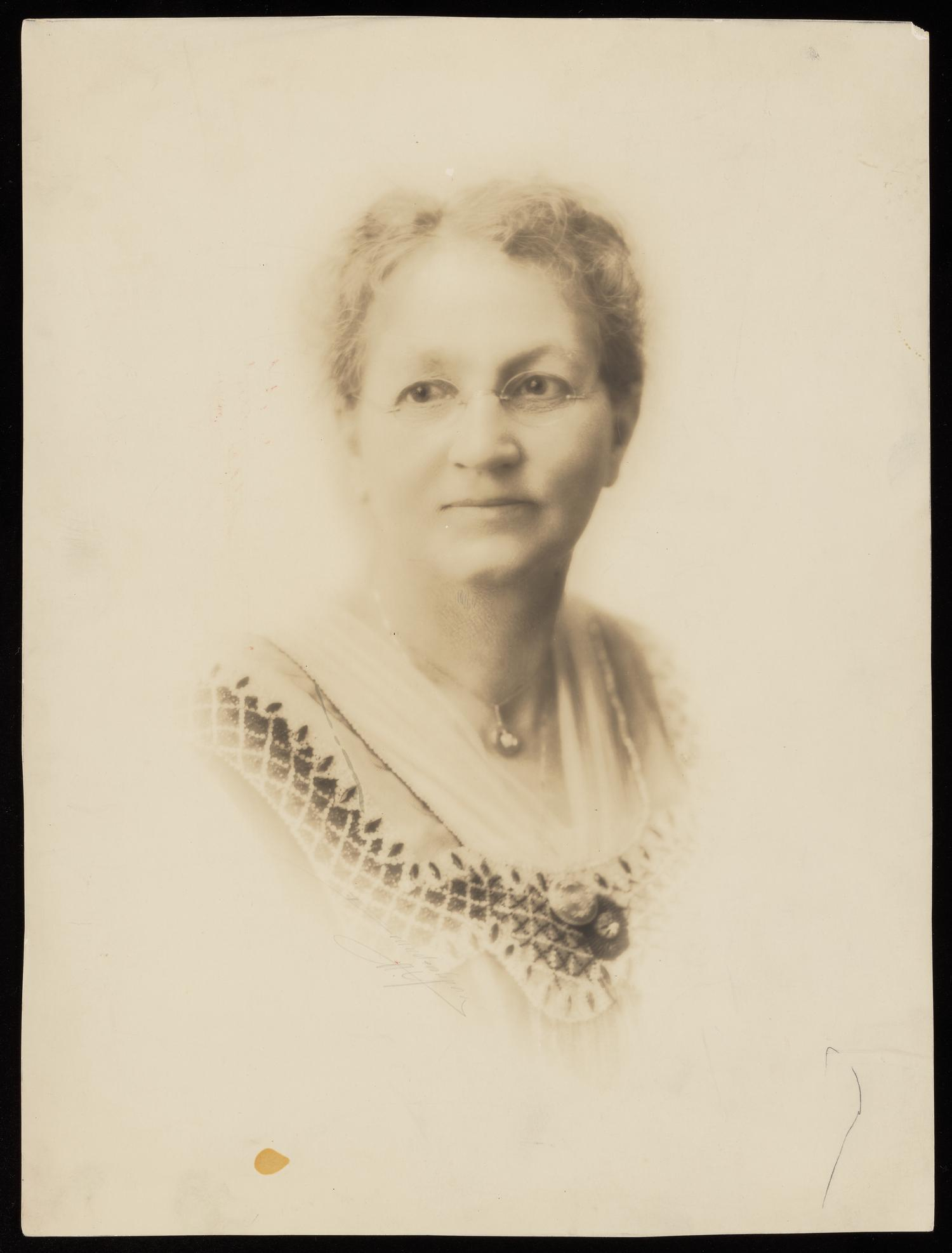
- Born: March 27, 1851; Mount Vernon, Kentucky, US
- Died: October 17, 1931 (aged 80); Waco, Texas, US
- Burial place: Oakwood Cemetery
- Known for: Inaugural president of the Texas Federation of Women's Clubs
- Relatives: Katherine Rotan Drinker (daughter)

Kate Sturm McCall Rotan (1851–1931) was an American civic activist from Waco, Texas. She was the organizer and first president of the Texas Federation of Women's Clubs, earning her the sobriquet "The Mother of the Texas Federation." She was also a regent of the Henry Downs Chapter of the Daughters of the American Revolution, a National Committeewoman of the Colonial Dames, vice president of the Texas Congress of Mothers, and a member of the state Board of Control. Rotan was an early supporter of the library movement in Texas, which included helping to establish the first traveling library in the state in 1901, and an advocate for new legislation to develop Texas public libraries.

== Early life ==
Rotan was born on March 27, 1851, in Mount Vernon, Kentucky to parents James L. L. McCall and Eliza Ann Sturm McCall. The family relocated to Waco, Texas in 1852 via covered wagon. Kate was the fourth born of 13 McCall children, and she and her siblings were homeschooled. She graduated from the Waco Female College in 1865.

In 1867, Rotan accepted a teaching position at an East Waco school. It was there that she met Edward Rotan, a fellow educator, and the two married on August 22, 1869. The couple had nine children together, including Katherine Rotan Drinker, four of whom died at a young age. The couple taught for a few years into their marriage; however, Edward was offered a partnership in the country dry goods store owned by local merchant William Riley Kellum. Edward later became the president when Kellum died in 1890. The Rotan Grocery Company thrived, and went on to become the largest wholesale grocery provider in the South.

== Civic involvement ==
Freed from her teaching duties and armed with both leisure and affluence, Rotan became a "cityshaker."

She joined the sewing circle at her church, First Presbysterian Church of Waco, and made clothing and quilts for the city's less fortunate. The church later memorialized the Rotans for their contributions with a stained glass display in their northwest window. According to the job file of Charles J. Connick, the window's designer, the Rotans "became a legend in Waco, so much so that at their deaths the town went into mourning."

Rotan was also a founder of Waco's first literary club, the Women's Club of Waco. In 1897, Kate sent invitations on behalf of the Women's Club to literary clubs across the state with a call to organize a state-wide league. Delegates from 18 clubs convened in Waco in May 1897 to form the Texas Federation of Women's Clubs. Rotan was elected its first president.

== Support of libraries ==
Rotan was an avid believer in the importance of literacy and education, and her early support of libraries led to the establishment of the first traveling library in Texas, which began circulating "10 cases of well-selected books" throughout rural McLennan County in 1901. Likewise, libraries and education became some of the first concerns for the Texas Federation of Women's Clubs, which supported the funding and establishment of public libraries in the state. The support of the Texas women's clubs helped to establish more than 70% of the public libraries in Texas.

Waco's first public library, a result of a donation by notorious library supporter Andrew Carnegie, came about as the culmination of a decade of community action by Waco residents, including businessmen, town leaders, and club women, like Rotan. Carnegie committed to a $1,000 donation towards the library if the citizens of Waco could raise $2,000. If they were able to reach their fundraising goal, Carnegie pledged an additional $30,000 grant for a free-standing building, if Waco city leaders budgeted $3,000 per year for its upkeep and operation. The community, with the help of Rotan and the Texas Federation of Women's Clubs, was able to meet the fundraising demand. Construction began on the new library in 1904.

== Other philanthropic work ==
Rotan was a female pioneer of her time. Unlike many women in the era, Rotan taught for several years following her marriage to Edward. She also believed in the ability of women to change their communities through women's clubs – "When women unite, they acknowledge no defeat."

In "Of What Use is a Federation Organ?" from The Federation Bulletin of 1906, Rotan advocated for a "properly edited and well-sustained" periodical of women's clubs activities. She suggested that "she who seeks to make the most of her ability, who feels her need of suggestion and inspiration for serious study, who desires to know what is being done by club women for enrichment of life, and for the promotion of ethical, education and civic betterment ... who seeks to feel the heart throb of that larger, nobler impulse in our twentieth century womanhood" will "find all these hinted or expressed, suggested or evolved in the pages of the carefully edited club journal." Rotan stated that women should read and study "the line of their deepest need or greatest interest," and should curate their newspapers and journals "with the same care, and for like reasons as the successful business man."

Rotan also "had a heart for 'wayward girls,' the unwed mothers and the homeless young women of her community." She gave a speech at the 1912 Texas Conference on Charities and Corrections entitled "The Wayward Girl." Through her membership with the state Board of Control, Rotan helped to raise $25,000 to build the Gainesville State School for Girls. She later wrote in to the Waco Times-Herald to protest the building of a 10-foot high fence around the school, arguing that the fence would "destroy every good purpose for which the school was organized" by locking the girls – who were "often more sinned against than sinning" – inside the school like criminals.

Rotan died at her home in Waco on October 17, 1931, and was buried at Oakwood Cemetery.

== Legacy ==
In 1910, William Cameron Park was developed in Waco. The city began a drive to beautify waterfront property as part of the City Beautiful Movement. In conjunction with the park, Waco released plans for a scenic roadway to link the park to the downtown business district of Waco. Rotan played a large part in bringing this vision to fruition. She spent a year lobbying for and acquiring land for the roadway, and donating it to the city. To honor Rotan's contributions, the scenic roadway was called Rotan Drive.

The Rotan mansion, known as one of the most distinctive houses in Waco, has also been preserved. The Rotan-Dossett House was built in 1891. Edward Rotan later added a two-story porch to the front of the home. The Rotans sold the home, which was purchased by local businessman Andrew J. Dossett in 1917.
