= Lydia Dean Pilcher =

American film producer

- Occupations: Film and Television Producer/Director
- Known for: Founder of Cine Mosaic

Lydia Dean Pilcher is an American film and television producer and director and founder of Cine Mosaic, a production company based in New York City.

A two time Emmy Award winner, Pilcher was nominated for an Academy Award in 2014 for Cutie & The Boxer, directed by Zachary Heinzerling (winner of 2013 Sundance Directing Award); and Sony Pictures Classics released the Cine Mosaic production of The Lunchbox, directed by Ritesh Batra (winner of 2013 Critics Week Viewers Choice Award at Cannes Film Festival). In 2013, The Reluctant Fundamentalist was released by IFC Films, based on the highly acclaimed novel by Mohsin Hamid, starring Riz Ahmed, Kate Hudson, Kiefer Sutherland, Liev Schreiber, and directed by Mira Nair. Pilcher has produced over 35 films including The Darjeeling Limited, directed by Wes Anderson; Jesus' Son, directed by Alison Maclean, and eleven films with director Mira Nair including The Namesake, Vanity Fair, Amelia, Mississippi Masala and most recently Queen of Katwe for The Walt Disney Company; and HBO Films' The Immortal Life of Henrietta Lacks, based on the NY Times best selling book by Rebecca Skloot, starring Oprah Winfrey and Rose Byrne, directed by George C. Wolfe.

In 2018, Pilcher made her solo directing bow with the feature, A Call to Spy, a thriller based on the true stories of women who worked spies during the French Resistance of WWII. Before this in 2017, Pilcher co-directed the feature film, Radium Girls, starring Joey King and Abby Quinn with Executive Producer Lily Tomlin, which premiered at the 2018 Tribeca Film Festival. Pilcher previously directed the HBO documentary "Reno Finds her Mom" and has directed the second unit of many of the films she produces, most recently The Immortal Life of Henrietta Lack, for HBO Films.

Most recently she was Executive Producer for the six hour mini-series "A Suitable Boy" with Mira Nair streaming on Netflix Worldwide & AcornTV in US. Projects in development include Fela: Music is the Weapon, based on the life of Nigerian musician and political activist, Fela Kuti, with director Melina Matsoukas for Focus Features.

== Film producer ==
After receiving a BA in Political Science and Communications at Antioch College (Yellow Springs, OH) and a MFA at New York University Graduate Institute of Film and Television in 1983, Pilcher began her career making documentaries and working in the production department of feature films including After Hours (dir: Martin Scorsese); F/X (dir: Robert Mandel); Round Midnight (dir: Bertrand Tavernier); Planes, Trains, and Automobiles (dir: John Hughes); Mississippi Burning (dir: Alan Parker); and Quiz Show (dir: Robert Redford).

In 2002, Pilcher founded Cine Mosaic, a production company based in New York City. Pilcher has produced numerous award-winning independent feature films, specializing in international co-production, and film finance based on studio and independent models.

In 2010, Pilcher was nominated for Emmy, Golden Globe, and PGA Awards for producing HBO Films' You Don't Know Jack, directed by Barry Levinson. The film, starring Al Pacino, follows Jack Kevorkian's battle to legalize assisted suicide. Prior to that, Pilcher produced Jesus' Son, starring Billy Crudup, directed by Alison Maclean; The Darjeeling Limited, directed by Wes Anderson; and eleven movies with director Mira Nair including Amelia, starring Hilary Swank as the famous aviator, and The Namesake, based on the novel by Jhumpa Lahiri, released by Fox Searchlight. Pilcher was nominated in 2005 for a Golden Globe Award for the HBO feature film, Iron Jawed Angels directed by Katja von Garnier and starring Hilary Swank and Anjelica Huston. She was nominated in 2004 for an Emmy Award, Golden Globe and Producer's Guild Award as the Executive Producer of Normal with writer/director Jane Anderson and starring Jessica Lange and Tom Wilkinson.

== Sustainability and environmental work ==
Pilcher is a Founder and Chair of PGA Green, an active initiative of the Producers Guild of America since 2006, dedicated to supporting sustainability in the entertainment industry, and winner of the 2011 EMA Green Production Award. With seed funding and support provided by Disney, DreamWorks Studios, 20th Century Fox, NBC Universal, Paramount Pictures, Sony Pictures Entertainment and Warner Bros., the Green Production Guide was created by PGA Green to provide a new resource for film, television and commercial professionals looking to increase the sustainability of their productions. The website and mobile app includes a carbon calculator, the PGA Green Unified Best Practices Guide, and a substantial vendor guide of companies that provide sustainable and energy saving products and services for the entertainment industry. Pilcher is a member of The Climate Reality Project, founded and chaired by Al Gore, and has been a speaker and panelist at many public and film events including Berlin Film Festival, Toronto International Film Festival, Woodstock Film Festival, and PGA's Produced by Conference. Pilcher is a recipient of the City of New York's Made in New York Award, which recognizes those who have made significant contributions to the growth of NYC's media and entertainment industries.

== Boards and organizations ==
- Vice President of Motion Pictures, Producers Guild of America, 2014–2018
- Co-Founder and Chair of PGA Women's Impact Network, 2013–2018
- Producer's Council Board of Delegates of the Producers Guild of America, 2013–2014.
- Member of the National Board of Directors of the Producers Guild of America, 2008-13.
- Vice Chair of Producers Guild of America East, 2004-08.
- Co-Founder and Chair of PGA Green, 2006–present.
- Board Member, Maisha Film Lab, based in East Africa, 2004–present.
- Board Member, The New York Production Alliance, 2005-08.
- Women's eNews, named one of the 21 Leaders for the 21st Century in 2005.
- Member: Academy of Motion Picture Arts and Sciences, Producers Guild of America, Academy of Television Arts and Sciences, New York Women in Film, Directors Guild of America, Independent Feature Project, The Climate Reality Project.

== Personal life ==
She is married to production designer Mark Friedberg; they have two children.

== Filmography ==
=== Producer ===
- The Kill–Off (1988)
- Longtime Companion (1989)
- Mississippi Masala (1991)
- The Perez Family (1995)
- Kama Sutra: A Tale of Love (1996)
- Chinese Box (1997)
- Cradle Will Rock (1999)
- Jesus' Son (1999)
- The Talented Mr. Ripley (1999)
- Disappearing Acts (2000)
- Hysterical Blindness (2002)
- 11'09"01 September 11 (2002) – segment: India
- Normal (2003)
- Iron Jawed Angels (2004)
- Lipstick & Dynamite, Piss & Vinegar: The First Ladies of Wrestling (2004)
- Vanity Fair (2004)
- The Namesake (2006)
- The Darjeeling Limited (2007)
- Amelia (2009)
- You Don't Know Jack (2010)
- The Reluctant Fundamentalist (2013)
- Cutie & The Boxer (2013) – Nominated: Academy Award for Best Documentary Feature
- The Lunchbox (2014)
- The Sisterhood of Night (2015)
- Queen of Katwe (2016)
- The Immortal Life of Henrietta Lacks (2017)
- A Suitable Boy (2020) (Television miniseries)

=== Director ===
- Reno Finds Her Mom (1998) – director, producer
- Radium Girls (2018) – director only
- A Call to Spy (2019) – director, producer

== See also ==
- List of female film and television directors
