= Radium Girls (film) =

2018 American drama film

- Film poster
- Directed by: Lydia Dean Pilcher; Ginny Mohler
- Written by: Ginny Mohler; Brittany Shaw
- Based on: Radium Girls by Kate Moore
- Produced by: Lydia Dean Pilcher; Emily McEvoy
- Starring: Joey King; Abby Quinn
- Cinematography: Mathieu Plainfossé
- Edited by: Giacomo Ambrosini; Ben Garchar; Seth Skundrick
- Music by: Lillie Rebecca McDonough
- Production company: Cine Mosaic
- Distributed by: Juno Films
- Release dates: April 27, 2018 (Tribeca); October 23, 2020
- Running time: 102 minutes
- Country: United States
- Language: English

Radium Girls is a 2018 American drama film directed by Lydia Dean Pilcher and Ginny Mohler and starring Joey King and Abby Quinn. Lily Tomlin and Jane Wagner serve as executive producers. Originally screened at the Tribeca Film Festival in 2018, the film was supposed to be released to North American theaters in early April 2020, with a wider release later in the month. The release was postponed due to the COVID-19 pandemic. On October 23, 2020, the film was released in select theaters and virtual cinemas. It is based on the book of the same name by Kate Moore.

== Plot ==
Bessie and Josephine "Jo" Cavallo are sisters who live with their grandfather in New Jersey. Both sisters work at American Radium, where they paint watch dials.

One day, Bessie meets Walter White, a young communist and photographer, who comes to take pictures of the young women at work in the factory. Bessie and Walt fall for each other, each involving the other more and more into each other's lives. Walt brings Bessie into his world of subversive political thought and counter-culture, at one point directing her to Ms. Wiley, who leads the Consumer's League of New Jersey.

Jo eventually falls ill, and Bessie seeks out help. When Mr. Roeder, the foreman, sends along the company doctor, Dr. Flint, the latter finds no problem with Jo. After the sisters ask for him to run more tests, he returns with a diagnosis of syphilis, which was the same diagnosis given to the eldest Cavallo sister, Mary, before she died two years prior.

The Cavallo sisters refuse to accept this diagnosis, especially as Jo is a virgin. They seek help from Wiley, who is willing to go against American Radium, but she warns them that the process won't be easy. Bessie tries to warn the other girls at the factory of the dangers and urges them to get tested for radium poisoning, but most are reluctant to quit or get tested. Once Mary's body is exhumed and tested, her bones are found to be radioactive, strengthening the case against American Radium. Eventually two more girls join the Cavallo sisters, but American Radium responds to this momentum by trying to coerce the Cavallo sisters into silence, and then intimidating them by following them around when they walk alone.

Eventually, Mr. Henry Berry agrees to represent the case of the dial painters. The trial proceeds and seems to be going well, but Bessie knows she needs stronger support for her side, so she seeks out Mr. Leech, the branch supervisor, who also had a secret relationship with Mary before her death. Bessie eventually finds Leech in the hospital, suffering of radium poisoning. After much convincing, Leech agrees to testify on behalf of the dial painters, because of the love he held for Mary. Yet, when he is called to the stand, he lies, saying he never had a relationship with Mary, and that he had never warned her of the dangers of radium. When Bessie asks him why he changed his testimony, he says that his sister died of cancer, and while he wasn't able to help or cure her, at least American Radium would provide for her children and grandchildren, so he had to help it survive.

After the state trial judge grants American Radium a long extension on the negotiations, a federal judge who had taken an interest in the case negotiates a deal on behalf of the victims (by now dubbed the "Radium Girls"). The girls are granted $10,000, each, and the factory in New Jersey will be shut down. The girls, with the exception of Bessie, are delighted. Bessie is reluctant to accept this deal, because she wants the impacts of the case to be further reaching - but, as Wiley says, "It is never over." All the girls end up signing the settlement.

The epilogue states that radium was used to paint luminous clocks until the 1970s, that the judge who had negotiated the settlement was a stockholder in American Radium, that the Radium Girls case impacted labor law in the United States, and that a Geiger counter placed over the grave of a Radium Girl would click for more than a thousand years.

== Cast ==
- Joey King as Bessie Cavallo
- Abby Quinn as Josephine Cavallo
- Cara Seymour as Wylie Stephens
- Scott Sheperd as Mr. Leech
- Susan Heyward as Etta
- Collin Kelly-Sordelet as Walt
- Neal Huff as Dr. Flint
- Veanne Cox as Dr. Katherine Drinker

== Reception ==
The film has a 75% rating on Rotten Tomatoes based on 36 reviews, with an average rating of 6.4/10. Metacritic reports a score of 52 out of 100 based on six critic reviews, indicating "mixed or average reviews".

Roxana Hadadi of RogerEbert.com awarded the film one and a half stars. Kate Erbland of IndieWire graded the film a C+.

Jessica Kiang of Variety gave the film a negative review and wrote, "...the film aims for inspirational true story, but is sadly uninspired, and its relationship to real history is obscured by the schematic way it is fictionalized."

Frank Scheck of The Hollywood Reporter gave the film a positive review and wrote, "Although its low-budget cinematic execution feels a bit lacking at times, the film fulfills a vital function with its dramatization of an important chapter in America's history of labor reform."
