= These Shining Lives =

2008 play written by Melanie Marnich

- Original language: English
- Written by: Melanie Marnich
- Chorus: various doctors, lawyer, judge, son, daughter, reporters, radio announcer and crowd scenes
- Characters: Catherine Donohue, Charlotte Purcell, Francis O'Connell, Pearl Payne, Tom Donohue, Mr. Reed
- Subject: Workplace rights, triumph in adversity
- Genre: Documentary Fiction
- Setting: 1920s - 1930s. Ottawa, Illinois

Premiere
- Date: April 30, 2008
- Place: Center Stage, Baltimore

These Shining Lives is a play written by Melanie Marnich. It is based on the true story of four women who worked for the Radium Dial Company - a watch factory based in Ottawa, Illinois. The play showcases the danger women faced in this workplace and highlights the wider lack of concern companies had for protecting the health of their employees.

== Story ==
Narrated by one of the workers, Catherine Donohue, These Shining Lives shows women getting a chance for a well-paying job in the 1920s and early 1930s, which was uncharacteristic for the time in the United States. The job, which seems easy enough to the four main characters, is painting the hour markings onto different sized watch dials using a radium compound which glows in the dark. Radium Dial, the company that hires the women to do the painting, tells them that there is no evidence that radium is harmful, and even that it has health benefits. After a period of time, the workers notice that their hands start glowing in the dark, but assume that it is just from the radium powder that is used to paint the faces. The ladies then develop ailments, including jaw infections and bone pain. Several local doctors, including the company doctor, overlook the women's concerns and prescribe aspirin, which of course does not help. In the end, they have to travel to the city (Chicago) to find a doctor who is willing to put his name on the line and diagnose the women with radium poisoning. This in turn helps the four main characters decide to file a lawsuit against Radium Dial. An attorney, Leonard J. Grossman, agrees to take the case for free, with Donohue as the lead plaintiff.

At the denouement of the play, Catherine succumbs to the effects of radium poisoning. In the final scene, she poignantly narrates that prior to her death, she won her case seven times against the Radium Dial Company, the final time on appeal by Radium Dial to the US Supreme Court. The real Catherine Donohue died on July 27, 1938, shortly after testifying before the Illinois Industrial Commission.

The play premiered in 2008 at the Head Theater at Centerstage in Baltimore, Maryland under the direction of David Schweizer, artistic director, Irene Lewis and managing director, Michael Ross.

The story parallels a similar tragedy known as the Radium Girls.

== Time and style ==
As noted, the play is a period piece commencing in 1922 when the Radium Dial Company opened a factory in Ottawa, Illinois and closes around 1938, when the main protagonist, Catherine Donohue dies from her illness. The playwright notes that although the play is at times a docudrama, it should also be delivered with 'spirit, energy and verve' and at no time should the women be played 'as victims in any way'.

== Characters ==
The play is written for a minimum of six actors, with the play suggesting actors can 'double-up' on two or more roles. The four women of the story are pitched as being in their mid-late twenties. A full character list, as per the script, is provided below.

=== Female leads ===
Catherine Donohue - The main protagonist. The actor is required to switch between her character in the part of the narrator and her character in the story as she succumbs to radium poisoning.

Charlotte Purcell - Straight talking and tough. Although she is sharp when she first meets Catherine, they soon become good friends.

Frances O'Connell - Viewed as having the moral backbone of the four women, which could suggest she is a little older.

Pearl Payne - Easy-going and chatty. Likens to Catherine straight away.

=== Male leads ===
Tom Donohue - Catherine's husband. Feels emasculated when Catherine first gets the job, but warms up quickly to it. Fiercely protective of his wife.

Mr Reed - Radium Dial Supervisor.

=== Other named characters ===
Dr Rowntree - Makes a brief appearance promoting the perceived value of 'Radium'.

Dr Dalitsch - Doctor in Chicago who diagnoses radium poisoning.

Leonard Grossman - The attorney who agrees to take the case to court.

=== Unnamed supporting characters ===
Company Doctor - Makes a brief appearance as the first doctor to evaluate the women. He manipulates Catherine and the other women into doubting their concerns for their own health.

Judge - appears in the court cases.

Son - Son of Catherine and Tom.

Daughter - Daughter of Catherine and Tom.

Reporter 1 - Reports on court case.

Reporter 2 - Reports on court case.

Radio Announcer - Advertises for radium and Westclox.

== Settings ==
The majority of settings take place between the Donohue's home and the Radium Dial workroom. However, other shorter scenes take place in Doctor's rooms, the Courtroom and on the shores of Lake Michigan. The writer notes that 'all may exist minimally, perhaps more as a state of mind and imagination'.

== Structure and synopsis ==
The play is made up from twenty scenes, which the playwright states should transition fluidly. The first eight scenes are notably upbeat, setting the scene and building on Catherine's newfound relationship with her co-workers. Scene 8 finishes hinting at the tragedy that is yet to come with scene 9 demonstrating the changes Catherine is noticing with her body. From scene 10 we begin to see how radium poisoning manifests itself with the four women and how these go ignored by the company doctor and company supervisor. By scene 14, the women must travel to the city of Chicago to meet the first doctor to take an honest approach with them regarding their diagnoses. The final scenes are a mixture of the court case and final, tender moments spent at home. In the final scene, Catherine narrates the outcome of the case before paying respect and highlighting the strength of the women who died working for Radium Dial.
