= Archives of Environmental & Occupational Health =

- Discipline: Environmental health, occupational medicine
- Language: English
- Edited by: Jacqueline Moline

Publication details
- Former names: Journal of Industrial Hygiene, Archives of Environmental Health
- History: Since 1919
- Publisher: Taylor & Francis
- Frequency: Quarterly
- Impact factor: 0.9 (2024)

Standard abbreviations
- ISO 4: Arch. Environ. Occup. Health

Indexing
- ISSN: 1933-8244 (print); 2154-4700 (web)
- LCCN: 2006251216
- OCLC no.: 228657521

Links
- Journal homepage; Online access; Online archive

Archives of Environmental & Occupational Health is a quarterly peer-reviewed medical journal covering environmental and occupational health. It was established in 1919 as the Journal of Industrial Hygiene, and was renamed in 1960 to the Archives of Environmental Health. It obtained its current name in 2005. It is published by Taylor & Francis and the editor-in-chief is Jacqueline Moline (Hofstra University). According to the Journal Citation Reports, the journal has a 2024 impact factor of 0.9.
