= List of Lehigh University people =

This is a list of Lehigh University people, including former presidents, faculty, and alumni of Lehigh University in Bethlehem, Pennsylvania, U.S.

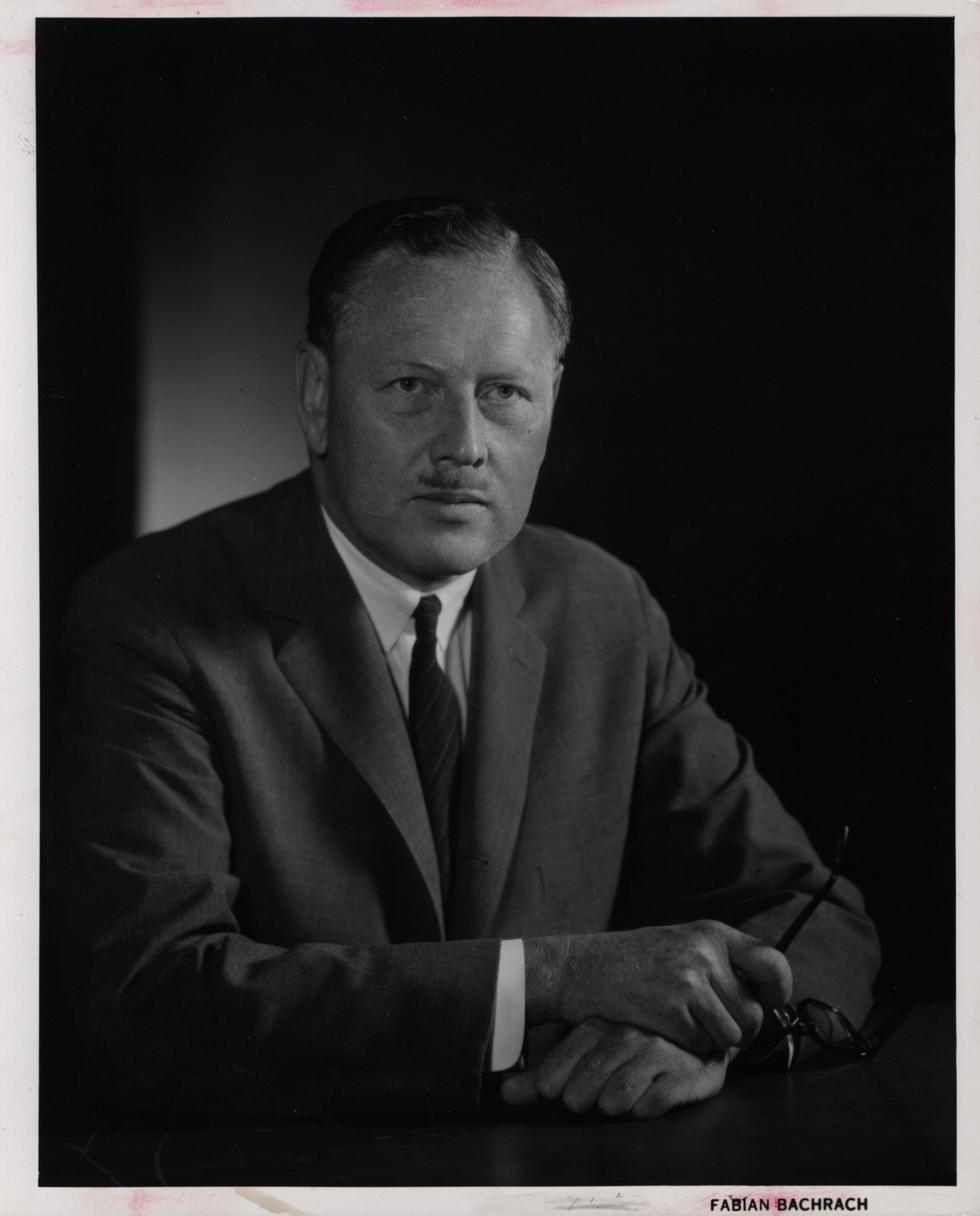
Deming Lewis was the university's tenth president from 1964 to 1982, and was in charge of the construction of most of the modern campus.

== Presidents ==
No.	Name	Tenure	Notes
1.	Henry Coppée	1866–1875	Mexican–American War veteran and president of the Aztec Club of 1847. Christmas Hall renovated, Packer Hall and president's house constructed.
2.	John McDowell Leavitt	1875–1880	Episcopal priest, lawyer and journalist. Linderman Library constructed.
3.	Robert Alexander Lamberton	1880–1893	Lawyer. Coppee Hall and Chandler-Ullmann constructed. Phi Beta Kappa founded.
4.	Thomas Messinger Drown	1895–1904	Created MIT's chemical engineering program. Led school through Panic of 1893. Williams Hall constructed.
-	William H. Chandler	1904–1905	Chandler, a professor at the university, served as acting president after Drown's sudden death during a surgery.
5.	Henry Sturgis Drinker	1905–1920	Class of 1871, first alumnus to hold position. Fritz Lab, Drown Hall, Coxe Lab, Taylor Hall, Taylor Gym, Taylor Stadium, and Lamberton Hall constructed. Split school into colleges.
-	Natt M. Emery	1920–1922	Drinker resigned in 1920. His vice president, Natt M. Emery, served as acting president until 1922.
6.	Charles Russ Richards	1922–1935	Graduate school opened to women, Alumni Memorial constructed.
7.	Clement C. Williams	1935–1944	University of Iowa's dean of engineering. Richards and Drinker dorms built. Retired in 1944.
8.	Martin Dewey Whitaker	1946–1960	Manhattan Project alumni. Dravo, McClintic-Marshall, and Centennials I dorms built. Whitaker Lab built.
9.	Harvey A. Neville	1961–1964	First and only elected president.
10.	Deming Lewis	1964–1982	Bell Labs alumnus. Maginnes Hall, Whitaker Lab, Mart Science and Engineering Library, Sinclair Lab, the Seeley G. Mudd Building, Neville Hall, Rathbone Dining Hall, Centennial II, Brodhead, Trembley Park, Saucon Village dorms, and the Philip Rauch Field House, and the Stabler center constructed.
11.	Peter Likins	1982–1997	Purchased Mountaintop Campus from Bethlehem Steel. Demolished Taylor Stadium to make room for Rauch and Zoellner Halls. Resigned to become an advisor to George H. W. Bush.
-	William C. Hittinger	1997–1998	Class of 1944. A 22-year veteran of the board of trustees. Selected as interim president after Likins resigned.
12.	Gregory C. Farrington	1998–2006	Helped raise $250 million for the endowment of professors as well as another $75 million for the recruitment of new professors.
13.	Alice P. Gast	2006–2014	First female president. Opened Lehigh's Stabler Campus. in 2010 named to the post of science envoy by Hillary Clinton. Resigned to be named president of the Imperial College London.
-	Kevin L. Clayton	2014–2015	Alumnus from large family of alumni, 22-year veteran of the board of trustees.
14.	John D. Simon	2015–2021	Former provost of the University of Virginia. Established the College of Health. SouthSide Commons, Singleton, Hitch, and Maida dorms constructed.
15.	Joseph J. Helble	2021–present	Class of 1982. Renamed Packer Hall to Clayton Hall. Lehigh's Business Innovation Building constructed.

== Alumni ==
=== Academia ===
- David Bader (BSCompE, 1990; MSEE, 1991), Distinguished Professor of Computer Science at the New Jersey Institute of Technology and former Georgia Tech professor
- Anthony G. Collins (D.Eng. Civil Eng., 1982), former Clarkson University president
- Peter Feaver (BA, 1983), Duke University professor and former member of the National Security Council in the Clinton and George W. Bush administrations
- James D. Foley (BSEE, 1964), Georgia Tech professor and co-author, Computer Graphics: Principles and Practice
- Kenneth French (Mech. E., 1976), Dartmouth College finance department chairman and American Finance Association president
- Robert M. Gordon (born 1947)
- Robert L. Ketter, former University of Buffalo president
- Andrew H. Knoll (1973), Harvard University paleontologist and geologist and member of the National Academy of Sciences
- Ted London (BS Mech. Eng 1985), Base of the Pyramid expert at the Stephen M. Ross School of Business and William Davidson Institute senior research fellow
- Robert J. Nemiroff (1987), Michigan Technological University professor
- Paul C. Paris (1955), Washington University in St. Louis professor emeritus
- Walter C. Pitman, III (1956), Columbia University professor emeritus and expert on sea floor spreading
- James R. Rice (1962), Harvard University physicist
- Herman Schneider (1894), University of Cincinnati former president and developer of cooperative education
- James E. Talmage (Geology, 1884), University of Utah, LDS religious leader
- John Texter (1949), Eastern Michigan University professor emeritus, author, inventor,
- Paul Torgersen (B.S. Industrial Engr., 1953)
- Amit H. Varma (Ph.D. Civil Eng., 2001), Purdue University Karl H. Kettelhut Professor in Civil Engineering

=== Architecture ===
- Roland E. Borhek (1883), architect
- Wallis Eastburn Howe (1889), architect

=== Business ===
- William Amelio (BS Chem. Eng., 1979), Avnet CEO and former Lenovo CEO
- Patrice Banks, Girls Auto Clinic founder and author
- Tom Bayer, Reserve Bank of Vanuatu director
- Bob Born (1944), Just Born president
- William Butterworth, John Deere president and chairman
- Steve Chang, Trend Micro co-founder and former CEO
- Stacey Cunningham (BS Industrial Engineering, 1996), 67th president of the New York Stock Exchange
- Jack Dreyfus (1934), Dreyfus Fund founder
- Cathy Engelbert (1986), first female CEO of Deloitte and first commissioner of the WNBA
- Murray H. Goodman, real estate developer
- Eugene Grace (1899), former Bethlehem Steel president
- Richard Hayne (BA Anthropology 1969), Urban Outfitters, Anthropologie, and Free People co-founder
- Marc Holtzman (1982), Barclays Capital vice chairman and Kazkommertsbank chairman
- Lee Iacocca (Industrial Eng. 1945, Hon D.Eng. 1965), former Chrysler chairman
- Kevin J. Kennedy (1978), Avaya CEO
- Reginald Lenna (BS Industrial engineering, 1936), Blackstone Inc. CEO
- John E. McGlade, Air Products chairman, president, and CEO
- Edward Avery McIlhenny (1896), McIlhenny Company CEO]
- Henry H. Minskoff, real estate developer
- John R. Patrick (BS Electrical engineering, 1967), former IBM vice president
- Joseph R. Perella (BS Business & Economics 1964), former investment banking chairman at Morgan Stanley
- Paul Zane Pilzer (BA Journalism 1974), economist
- Barry Rosenstein (BA, 1981), hedge fund manager
- Fredrick D. Schaufeld (BA Government 1981), entrepreneur and venture capital investor
- Tsai Shengbai (1919), textiles industry
- Fred Trump Jr. (1960), pilot and executive at the Trump Organization; older brother of President Donald Trump
- Fred Trump III, author and advocate for people with disabilities; nephew of President Donald Trump
- Robert Zoellner (BS 1954), investor and stamp collector

=== Entertainment ===
- Dick Berg (1942), screenwriter
- Jim Davidson (1985), actor, Pacific Blue
- Brooke Eby, business development manager and social media personality
- Paul Guilfoyle (1972), actor, CSI: Crime Scene Investigation
- Maria Jacquemetton (BA English, 1983), Emmy, Golden Globe, Writers Guild of America, and Peabody Award-winning writer and supervising producer of Mad Men
- Romy Mars, actress and singer, daughter of Sofia Coppola and Thomas Mars
- Don Most (1972), actor, Happy Days (attended but did not graduate)
- Ian Riccaboni, host of All Elite Wrestling's Ring of Honor
- Louis Clyde Stoumen (1939), Academy Award-winning director and producer

=== Journalism and literature ===
- Martin Baron (BA Journalism and MBA, both 1976), Washington Post editor and former Boston Globe editor
- Tracy Byrnes (1993), Fox Business television reporter
- William E. Coles, Jr. (BA English, 1953), novelist and professor
- Richard Harding Davis (1886), war correspondent, journalist, and writer of fiction and drama
- Robert Gibb (MA English, 1976), poet, short-story writer, essayist, critic, editor, and professor
- Michael Golden (1971), The International Herald Tribune publisher and vice chairman of The New York Times Company
- William P. Gottlieb (BS business and economics, 1939), jazz author and photographer
- Russell Lee (1925), photojournalist
- Edwin Lefèvre (1893), one of the first journalists specialized on covering business
- David A. Randall (English, 1928), book dealer and librarian
- Len Roberts (PhD English, 1976), poet, translator, and professor
- Stephanie Ruhle (1997), MSNBC anchor and NBC News correspondent
- Michael Smerconish (BA Government, 1984), author and radio commentator
- Andrea Tantaros (2001), former Fox News Channel co-host and political contributor
- Les Whitten (BA English and Journalism, 1950), investigative reporter and novelist

=== Law ===
- Edward N. Cahn (1955), United States District Court for the Eastern District of Pennsylvania judge; namesake of Edward Cahn Federal Building and Courthouse
- Robert L. Clifford (1946), New Jersey Supreme Court associate justice
- James Cullen Ganey (1920), United States Court of Appeals for the Third Circuit judge
- Ronald A. Guzman (1970), United States District Court for the Northern District of Illinois judge
- Alina Habba (2005), attorney for former U.S. president Donald Trump
- Edwin Kneedler (1967), deputy solicitor general of the United States
- Paul Lewis Maloney (1972), United States District Court for the Western District of Michigan judge
- Malcolm Muir (1935), United States District Court for the Middle District of Pennsylvania judge
- Maryellen Noreika (1988),United States District Court for the District of Delaware judge
- Donald F. Parsons (1973), Court of Chancery of the State of Delaware vice chancellor
- Stephen Victor Wilson (1963), United States District Court for the Central District of California judge

=== Medicine ===
- Harry J. Buncke, plastic surgeon
- Steven J. Burakoff, cancer specialist
- Frank L. Douglas, biomedical industry
- Stephen K. Klasko, Jefferson Health CEO
- Gail Saltz, psychiatrist and television commentator
- Sandra Welner, specialist in disabled women's healthcare

=== Military ===
- Ralph Cheli (1941), USAAF, awarded the Medal of Honor posthumously for valor in World War II
- General Timothy D. Haugh (BA 1991), USAF, director, National Security Agency
- Colin J. Kilrain (1982), U.S. Navy SEAL, anti-terrorism expert, military attache to Mexico, PACCOM Special Ops commander, NATO Special Ops commander
- Daniel J. O'Neill (MS, c. 1987), US Army major general
- David M. Peterson (1915), fighter ace with the Lafayette Escadrille and U.S. Army Air Service credited with six victories, twice awarded the Distinguished Service Cross
- Edwin H. Simmons USMC (1942), veteran of the Battle of Chosin Reservoir and USMC chief historian
- Franklin C. Spinney (BS Mech. Eng, 1967), U.S. Air Force Reserve and military analyst
- John H. Tilelli, Jr. (MBA 1972), U.S. Army vice chief of staff

=== Politics ===
- Pongpol Adireksarn (1964), deputy prime minister of Thailand
- William David Blakeslee Ainey, U.S. congressman
- Ali Al-Naimi (BS Geology 1962), Saudi Arabia minister of Petroleum and Mineral Resources and Aramco chairman
- Carville Benson (1890), U.S. congressman
- William A. Collins, Connecticut state representative and four-term mayor of Norwalk, Connecticut
- Charlie Dent (MPA, 1993), U.S. congressman
- Geoff Diehl (1992), Massachusetts House of Representatives member
- Clarence Ditlow III (BS Chemical Engineering), advocate for automotive safety
- Manuel V. Domenech (1888), Ponce, Puerto Rico member and treasurer of the Commonwealth of Puerto Rico
- Lori Ehrlich (1985), Massachusetts House of Representatives member
- Peter D. Feaver (BA, 1983), member of the National Security Council in the Clinton and George W. Bush administrations and Duke University professor
- Robert L. Freeman (MA History, 1984), Pennsylvania House of Representatives member
- Walter O. Hoffecker (1877), U.S. congressman
- Robert A. Hurley (1917), 73rd governor of Connecticut
- Leonard Lance (Bachelor of Arts (BA), 1974), U.S. congressman
- Norton Lewis Lichtenwalner, U.S. congressman
- Jennifer Mann (1991), majority caucus secretary and member of Pennsylvania House of Representatives
- Robert Martin (MA History, 1971), New Jersey State Senator
- Paul F. McHale, Jr. (BA Government, 1972), assistant secretary of Defense for Homeland Defense and former U.S. congressman
- Rufus King Polk (1887), U.S. congressman
- Donald L. Ritter (BS Metallurgy, 1961), former U.S. congressman
- Richard Schmierer (1974), U.S. ambassador to Oman
- David Sidikman (1956), New York State Assembly member
- Donald Snyder (MBA 1976), Pennsylvania House of Representatives majority whip
- Edward J. Stack (1931), U.S. congressman
- Guy Talarico (B.S.), New Jersey General Assembly member
- Joseph Uliana (1987), Pennsylvania state representative and state senator
- Richard Verma (BS Industrial engineering, 1990), U.S. ambassador to India
- Francis E. Walter (1916), U.S. congressman
- Nora Slatkin (BA International Relations, 1977), Assistant Secretary of the Navy and CIA executive

=== Pulitzer Prize winners ===
- Martin Baron (1976), editor of The Washington Post, former editor of The Boston Globe, 2003 Pulitzer Prize winner
- Mark Antony De Wolfe Howe (1886), 1925 Pulitzer Prize winner
- Joe Morgenstern (BA English, 1953), 2005 Pulitzer Prize winner

=== Religion ===
- Antonio Gallardo Lucena, Episcopal bishop

=== Science and engineering ===
- Ali Al-Naimi (BS Geology, 1962), Saudi Aramco CEO and Saudi Arabia's Minister of Petroleum and Mineral Resources
- Daniel Amey (MBA), application engineer
- Walter C. Bachman (1933), chief engineer at Gibbs & Cox and ship propulsion expert
- John-David F. Bartoe (BS Physics 1966), Space Shuttle astronaut and International Space Station research manager for NASA
- Stephen James Benkovic (1960), chemist
- William Bowie (C.E. 1895), geodetic engineer and namesake of Bowie Seamount
- Morris Llewellyn Cooke (BS Mech. E., 1895), rural electrification leader during the 1920s and 1930s
- Paul Corkum (PhD Theoretical Physics, 1972), attosecond physics and laser science expert
- Albert P. Crary (MS Physics), Antarctic explorer
- Harry Diamond, engineer who developed proximity fuze
- Philip Drinker (Chem Eng., 1917), co-inventor of the modern respirator
- Lt. Col. Terry Hart, USAF (BS Mech. E., 1968, Hon. D.Eng., 1988), NASA Space Shuttle astronaut
- Captain Nicholas H. Heck (AB 1903, BSCE 1904), geophysicist, seismologist, oceanographer, hydrographic surveyor, and United States Coast and Geodetic Survey officer
- Lester Hogan (PhD Physics 1950), microwave and semiconductor pioneer
- Robert S. Knox (BS 1953), physicist
- Gary G. Lash (MS, PhD 1980), geologist known for Marcellus Shale calculations
- Bill Maloney (1980), mine drilling expert and participant in the Plan B rescue of miners during the 2010 Chilean mine disaster
- Daniel McFarlan Moore (1889), Moore lamp inventor
- William S. Murray (1895), electrical power generation and railroad electrification expert
- Lam M. Nguyen (Ph.D., 2018), computer scientist and applied mathematician; research scientist at IBM Research; known for his contributions to optimization methods for machine learning
- Jesse W. Reno (BS Mech Eng., 1883), builder of the world's first escalator
- Robert Serber (BS Engineering physics, 1930), physicist in the Manhattan Project
- Lewis B. Stillwell (1885), expert on electrical distribution, president of the IEEE and 1935 winner of the IEEE Edison Medal
- John Texter (1949; BSEE, 1971; MS Chem, 1973; MS Mathematics, 1976; PhD Chemistry, 1976), engineer and scientist in applied dispersion technology and small particle science, co-initiator of polymerized ionic liquids, and designer of thermodynamically stable dispersions
- John M. Thome (1870), director of the Argentina's national observatory, Observatorio Astronómico de Córdoba
- Richard Hawley Tucker (BS Civil Eng., 1887), astronomer; namesake of Tucker Crater on the Moon
- Claude Allen Porter Turner (BS Civil Eng., 1890), developed early reinforced concrete techniques
- Aneesh Varma (2006), founder of Aire and expert on behavior prediction algorithms
- William Wiswesser (1936; honorary doctorate 1970), chemist and pioneer in chemical informatics and inventor of Wiswesser line notation
- J. Lamar Worzel (1941), geophysicist and oceanographer
- Zhou Ming-Zhen, Chinese paleontologist, Chinese Academy of Sciences academic and recipient of the Romer-Simpson Medal

=== Sports ===
- Rabih Abdullah (1998), former National Football League (NFL) player
- Joe Alleva (BS finance, 1975; MBA, 1976), athletic director
- Craig Anderson (1960), former Major League Baseball (MLB) player
- Lon Babby (BA Political Science, 1973), Phoenix Suns president
- Adam Bergen (2004), NFL player, Arizona Cardinals and Dallas Cowboys
- Mason Black (2021), MLB player, San Francisco Giants
- Jordan Cohen (2020), Israel Basketball Premier League point guard
- Snooks Dowd, former MLB player
- Cathy Engelbert (1986), WNBA commissioner
- Sam Fishburn, former MLB player
- John Fitch (BS Civil Eng., 1938), auto racing
- Paul Hartzell (1976), former MLB player
- John Hill (1972), former NFL player
- Bill Hoffman, former NFL player
- Al Holbert (Mech. E. 1968), five-time IMSA GT Champion and member of International Motorsports Hall of Fame
- Marty Horn, former NFL quarterback
- Kevin Jefferson, former NFL linebacker
- Jarrod Johnson (1991), former NFL player
- Steve Kreider (1978), former NFL player
- Tim Mayer (1991), IMSA chief operating officer
- Matt McBride (2006), MLB player, Oakland Athletics
- CJ McCollum (BA Journalism, 2013), first Lehigh basketball player to be selected in the NBA draft
- Kim McQuilken (1973), former NFLplayer
- Rich Owens (1994), former NFL player
- Vincent "Pat" Pazzetti (1912), member of College Football Hall of Fame
- Roger Penske (1959), NASCAR and IndyCar team owner, member of International Motorsports Hall of Fame, and recipient of the Presidential Medal of Freedom
- Will Rackley (BA Design, 2011), former NFL player, Jacksonville Jaguars
- Julius Seligson (1930), NCAA and ITA national tennis champion and member of ITA Hall of Fame
- Scott Semptimphelter, former football player
- Ryan Spadola, former NFL wide receiver
- Levi Stoudt (2020), MLB player, Baltimore Orioles
- Lake Underwood (Mech. E.), professional sports car racer
- Bobby Weaver (1981), gold medal winner, wrestling, 1984 Summer Olympics
- Finn Wentworth (1980), former New Jersey Nets owner and YankeeNets president
- Adam Williamson (2005), former Major League Soccer soccer player, New England Revolution

=== Visual arts ===
- Tal Avitzur (1983), sculptor

== Faculty ==
=== Engineering ===
- Ferdinand P. Beer (1915–2003), French mechanical engineer, first chair of the department of mechanical engineering
- Helen M. Chan, British-born American materials scientist
- Dan M. Frangopol, Romanian-born American civil engineer
- Joseph I. Goldstein (1939–2015), materials scientist, mechanical engineer
- Terry Hart (born 1946), mechanical engineer, electrical engineer, astronaut
- George Rankine Irwin (1907–1998), materials scientist
- Miles Rock (1840–1901), civil engineer, astronomer

=== Mathematics ===
- Huai-Dong Cao (born 1959), Chinese-born American mathematician
- D. H. Lehmer (1905–1991), mathematician,
- Alexander Macfarlane (1851–1913) Scottish physicist and mathematician
- Ronald Rivlin (1915–2005), British-born American physicist, mathematician
- Miranda Teboh-Ewungkem (born 1974), Cameroonian-born American mathematician
- André Weil (1906–1998), French mathematician
- Albert Wilansky (1921–2017), Canadian-American mathematician

=== Writers ===
- John Grogan (born 1957), journalist and non-fiction writer
- Stephanie Powell Watts, author, novelist

=== Others ===
- Sirry Alang, Cameroonian-born American professor of sociology and public health researcher
- Michael Behe, biochemist, and intelligent design advocate
- Sidney A. Bludman, physicist
- Berrisford Boothe, visuàl artist
- Donald T. Campbell, social scientist
- Maurice Ewing (1906–1974), geophysicist and oceanographer
- Lawrence H. Gipson (1880–1971), historian of American history and British history
- John E. Hare (born 1949), British classicist, philosopher, ethicist
- Daniel Chonghan Hong (1956–2002), Korean-born American theoretical physicist
- Thomas Hyclak (born 1947), economist
- Rajan Menon (born 1953), political scientist
- Gordon Moskowitz (born 1963), social psychologist
- Francis J. Quirk (1907–1974), painter, professor of art 1950–1973
- Dork Sahagian, Armenian American climate scientist, and Nobel laureate
- Greg Strobel (1952–2020), wrestler and coach
- Ricardo Viera (1945–2022), Cuban-born American visual artist, educator, curator, and museum director
- George D. Watkins (born 1924), solid-state physicist, member of the National Academy of Sciences
