= Ricardo Ainslie =

American psychologist

- Education: University of California at Berkeley; University of Michigan.
- Writing career
- Genre: documentary film-maker
- Subjects: Ethnography; Educational psychology

Ricardo Ainslie is a Mexican-American documentary filmmaker. A native of Mexico City, his work is highly interdisciplinary in character, which explains his formal affiliations with the Lozano Long Institute for Latin American Studies, the Department of Mexican American and Latina/o Studies, and the American Studies programs at the University of Texas at Austin, where he is also a professor in the department of Educational Psychology. He holds dual US and Mexican citizenship. He earned his bachelor's degree (Psychology) at the University of California at Berkeley, and his Ph.D. in Clinical Psychology at the University of Michigan. He serves on the editorial boards of several academic journals including Psychoanalytic Psychology and Psychoanalysis, Culture, and Society.

== Professional history ==
For almost two decades now he has devoted himself to doing qualitative, ethnographic work in communities in Texas and Mexico that have experienced significant conflicts, stressors, and transformation, exploring how these communities function and how individuals and cultural groups live within them. He uses a variety of media, including documentary film, photographic exhibits, and books, to capture and depict the issues he explores in these projects (see his website at: ricardoainslie.com).

His initial three projects focused on Texas communities experiencing significant strain because of ethnic conflict. In No Dancin' In Anson: An American Story of Race and Social Change, he analyzed a small West Texas town's profound social change thirty years after the Civil Rights Act both in individual terms and as a collective experience.

In Hempstead, Texas, he used a documentary film format Crossover: A Story of Desegregation, 1999, Total Run Time 55 minutes, funded by Humanities Texas –the state affiliate for the National Endowment for the Humanities, to illustrate the bittersweet legacy of school desegregation. The film has been screened to a broad range of audiences across the country (including the National Science Foundation's Chautauqua Course in 2003, the American Psychological Association's National Multicultural conference in 2005, conferences at historically African American universities and community Black History Month events –over 22 screenings in all). Crossover became the cornerstone for "Crossover Lives," a Humanities Texas – National Endowment for the Humanities oral history project exploring personal narratives of the experience of school desegregation.

Following the 1998 racially motivated dragging death of James Byrd, a black man killed by three white supremacists in Jasper, Texas, Ricardo Ainslie explored the impact of the murder on that community in several scholarly journal articles. He also created, wrote, and produced Jasper, Texas: The Healing of a Community in Crisis, a traveling photographic exhibit (New York City, Austin, Dallas, Houston, Fort Worth, San Antonio, Galveston) for which he enlisted the collaboration of photographer Sarah Wilson (the exhibit book won the Digital News Award for Best Project -photography, text, design- in 2003). The exhibit development and the traveling exhibit events were funded by several grants from Humanities Texas. His 2004 book, Long Dark Road: Bill King and Murder in Jasper, explores the psychology of the white supremacist that played the lead role in the Byrd murder. Long Dark Road was runner up for Best Non-Fiction for the 2005 Hamilton Book Awards.

In 2006, Ricardo Ainslie completed a documentary film, Looking North: Mexican Images of Immigration (TRT 30 minutes, funded by Humanities Texas and the Trull Foundation). For this film he interviewed people in Mexico from all walks of life in order to convey how Mexicans experience the phenomenon of migration and its impact on their country. Looking North was screened as part of the American Psychological Association's Expert Conference on Immigration (San Antonio, 2006) as well as at the Linneae Terrarum, International Borders Conference (El Paso-Ciudad Juarez, 2006). He has also used this film in a series of Humanities Texas – sponsored immigration workshops across Texas.

In 2007, Ricardo Ainslie completed Ya Basta! Kidnapped in Mexico (TRT 74 minutes), a feature-length documentary film. The film uses Mexico's present climate of insecurity as a vehicle for exploring Mexico's transition to democracy, a process that has revealed long-standing deficits within its institutions, most notably deep-seated corruption within law enforcement and a flawed judicial system. This project was funded in part by the Yip Harburg Foundation and the Meredith Foundation. Ya Basta! has been screened at numerous film festivals in the United States, Mexico, and Europe, including South by Southwest Film Festival -USA, Cine Las Americas Film Festival -USA, Festival en Corto –San Miguel de Allende & Guanajuato -Mexico, Festival de Cine Morelia -Mexico, Leeds Film Festival -UK, Lonestar International Film Festival –USA, and Festival Internacional de Cine -Puebla, Mexico. Ya Basta! has also aired on television in Latin America and Eastern Europe, and has been screened at universities and professional conferences.

Ricardo Ainslie completed The Mystery of Consciousness (2010), a 26-minute documentary film funded by the Mind Science Foundation. In this film he used interviews with leading neuro-scientists from around the world to explore the neuroscience behind our understanding of how our brains create the experience of reflection and subjectivity.

In 2013, Ricardo Ainslie completed The Fight to Save Juárez: Life in the Heart of Mexico's Drug War, a book that explores the evolution, strategy, and status of Mexico's war against drug trafficking through the lens of its central battleground: the city of Juarez, Mexico. He spent nearly two years traveling to Juárez, interviewing journalists, human rights activists, family members of victims of violence, politicians, law enforcement, community leaders, and educators. He also interviewed several members of then-Mexican president Felipe Calderón's security cabinet for the book.

In 2018, he released The Mark of War, a feature-length documentary film in which he examines the transformative experience of being in at war through the narratives of seven Vietnam War, exploring their childhoods, their experiences in combat, and their lives since coming home. It debuted at the San Diego International Film Festival on October 13, 2018.

Since its release, Ricardo has focused on many projects. In 2017, he assumed the directorship of the Mexico Center at LLILAS Benson with the goal of building upon the Center’s long tradition of outstanding programs and research within the College of Liberal Arts at the University of Texas at Austin. He extended the center's activities and developed deep collaborations with colleges and schools across campus. In August 2020, Ricardo Ainslie became the Director of Research and Education for AMPATH Mexico. AMPATH Mexico is an initiative out of Dell Medical School’s Division of Global Health aiming to transform healthcare in economically poor, marginalized communities in the state of Puebla, Mexico, especially rural communities. They began with an extensive health needs and resources assessment in four communities in the summer of 2019, covering medical conditions, mental health, and access to care, and are still working to help Puebla.

== Awards ==
- Outstanding Contribution to Science Award, Texas Psychological Association, November, 2002
- Invited to teach National Science Foundation's Chautauqua Course, "Life History and Documentary Approaches to the study of Race and Culture", May, 2003
- Recipient (with Sarah Wilson & DJ Stout) of Digital News Award for Best Project (photography, text, design), for Exhibit book: "The Road to Redemption: Jasper, Texas, The healing of a Community Crisis" May, 2003
- Recipient Edith Sabshin Award, Outstanding Contribution to Psychoanalytic Education, American Psychoanalytic Association, January 2004
- Dean's Faculty Fellowship, College of Education, January 2005 and September 2010
- Runner-Up Robert W. Hamilton Book Award for "Long Dark Road: Bill King and Murder in Jasper, Texas" March 2005
- Fellow in the Charles H. Spence Centennial Professorship in Education, 2005-2012
- Fellow, American Board of Professional Psychology, 2005
- Inducted into the Texas Institute of Letters, Spring 2006
- Recipient Science Award, American Psychological Association, Division of Psychoanalysis, Spring 2009
- Selected, Rockefeller Foundation Bellagio Center Residency, Spring 2010
- Selected, Fellow of the John Simon Guggenheim Memorial Foundation, 2010-2011
- Named to Advisory Committee, American Psychological Association Presidential Task Force on Immigration, 2010
- Invited Congressional Testimony, U.S. House of Representatives Committee on Homeland Security "U.S. Homeland Security Role in the Mexico War Against Drug Cartels" 2011
- Recipient Psychoanalysis and Social Responsibility Achievement Award, 2012
- Inducted into the Texas Philosophical Society April 2014
- Awarded the M.K. Hage Centennial Professorship in Education, 2014
- 2010 Guggenheim Fellowship

== Works ==
=== Books ===
- The Child and the day care setting: qualitative variations and development, Praeger, 1984, ISBN 978-0-03-070291-4
- The psychology of twinship, University of Nebraska Press, 1985 (Second Edition: Northvale: Jason Aronson, Inc., 1997).
- No dancin' in Anson: an American story of race and social change, J. Aronson, 1995, ISBN 978-1-56821-585-3
- Long dark road: Bill King and murder in Jasper, Texas, University of Texas Press, 2004, ISBN 978-0-292-70574-6
- Ainslie, Ricardo C. with Sarah Wilson (photographer) (2004) The Road To Redemption. Jasper, Texas: The Healing of a Community In Crisis. Austin: Pentagram. Exhibit Book.
- "The Fight to Save Juárez: Life in the Heart of Mexico’s Drug War." University of Texas Press, 2013 ISBNL 978-0-292-73890-4

=== Documentary films ===
- Crossover: A story of desegregation. (Ainslie, R.C. 1999; TRT-55-minutes)
- Looking North: Mexican Images of Immigration. (Ainslie, R. C. 2006; TRT-30-minutes)
- Ya Basta! (Ainslie, R. C. 2007; TRT-75-minutes)
- The Mystery of Consciousness (Ainslie, R.C. 2010; TRT 30-minutes)
- "The Mark of War" (Ainslie, R.C. 2018; TRT 69-minutes)

=== Documentary exhibits ===
- "Jasper, Texas: The healing of a community in crisis" (in collaboration with Sarah Wilson).
