= Wesselmann =

Wesselmann is a surname. Notable people with the surname include:

- Debbie Lee Wesselmann, American novelist
- Tom Wesselmann (1931–2004), American artist
