= Hold down =

Hold down may refer to:

- Pinning hold, in grappling
- Hold down (structural engineering), a steel device in structural engineering
- Holdfast (tool), a type of clamp on a woodworking workbench
