= Shear wall =

Wall intended to withstand lateral loads

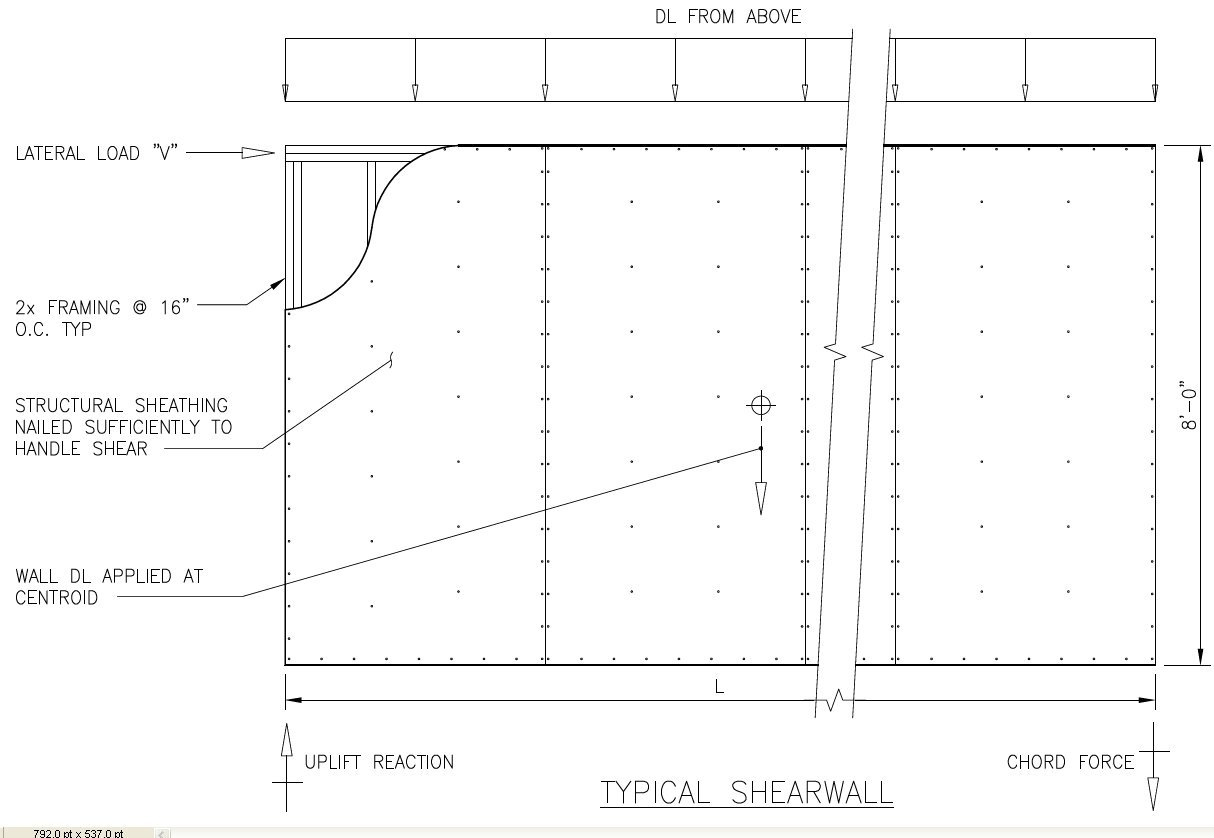
A typical timber shear wall consists of braced panels in the wall line, constructed using structural plywood sheathing, specific nailing at the edges, and supporting framing.

A shear wall is an element of a structurally engineered system that is designed to resist in-plane lateral forces, typically wind and seismic loads.

A shear wall resists loads parallel to the plane of the wall. Collectors, also known as drag members, transfer the diaphragm shear to shear walls and other vertical elements of the seismic-force-resisting system. Shear walls are typically made of light framed or braced wooden walls sheathed in shear-resisting material such as plywood or other structurally rigid panels, reinforced concrete, reinforced masonry, or steel plates.

While plywood is the conventional material used in wood (timber) shear walls, advances in technology and modern building methods have produced prefabricated options such as sheet steel and steel-backed shear panels used for narrow walls bracketing an opening that have proven to provide stronger seismic resistance.

In many jurisdictions, the International Building Code and International Residential Code govern the design of shear walls.

== Structural design considerations ==
=== Loading and failure mechanisms ===
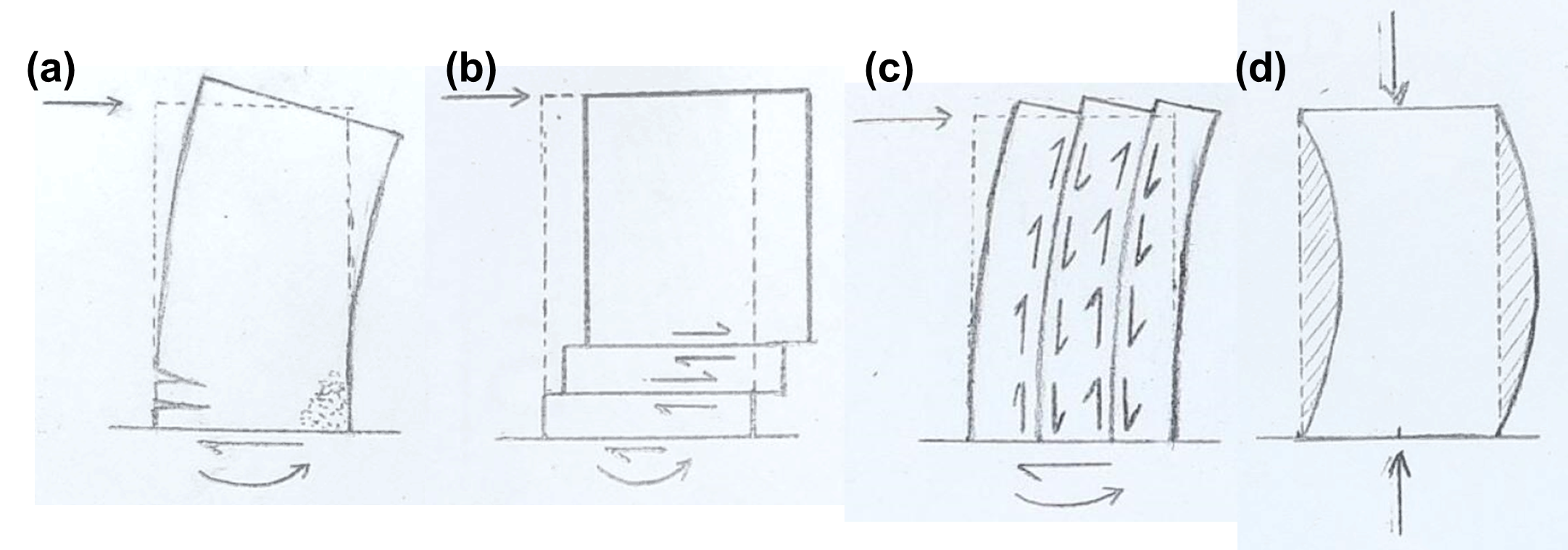
Figure 1 Failure mechanisms of shear walls. (a) flexural failure, (b) horizontal shear, (c) vertical shear, (d) buckling.

A shear wall is stiffer in its principal X and Y axes than it is in its Z axis. It is considered as a primary structure which provides relatively stiff resistance to vertical and horizontal forces acting in its plane. Under this combined loading condition, a shear wall develops compatible axial, shear, torsional and flexural strains, resulting in a complicated internal stress distribution. In this way, loads are transferred vertically to the building's foundation. Therefore, there are four critical failure mechanisms; as shown in Figure 1. The factors determining the failure mechanism include geometry, loading, material properties, restraint, and construction. Shear walls may also be constructed using light-gauge steel diagonal bracing members tied to collector and ancor points.

=== Slenderness ratio ===
The slenderness ratio of a wall is defined as the ratio of its effective height divided by its effective width or the radius of the gyration of the wall section. It is highly related to the slenderness limit that is the cut-off between elements being classed "slender" or "stocky". Slender walls are vulnerable to buckling failure modes, including Euler in-plane buckling due to axial compression, Euler out-of-plane buckling due to axial compression and lateral torsional buckling due to bending moment. In the design process, structural engineers need to consider all these failure modes to ensure that the wall design is safe under various kinds of possible loading conditions.

=== Coupling effect of shear walls ===
In actual structural systems, the shear walls may function as a coupled system instead of isolated walls depending on their arrangements and connections. Two neighboring wall panels can be considered coupled when the interface transfers longitudinal shear to resist the deformation mode. This stress arises whenever a section experiences a flexural or restrained warping stress and its magnitude is dependent on the stiffness of the coupling element. Depending on this stiffness, the performance of a coupled section will fall between that of an ideal uniform element of similar gross plan cross-section and the combined performance of the independent component parts. Another advantage of coupling is that it enhances the overall flexural stiffness dis-proportionally to shear stiffness, resulting in smaller shear deformation.

== Arrangement in buildings with different functions ==
The location of a shear wall significantly affects the building function, such as natural ventilation and daylighting performance. The performance requirements vary for buildings of different functions.

=== Hotel and dormitory buildings ===
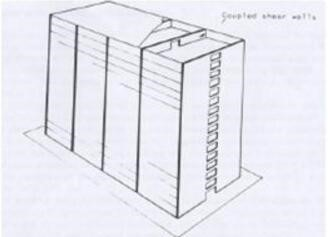
Figure 2 Coupled shear wall acting as a partitioning system

Hotel or dormitory buildings require many partitions, allowing insertions of shear walls. In these structures, traditional cellular construction (Figure 2) is preferred and a regular wall arrangement with transverse cross walls between rooms and longitudinal spine walls flanking a central corridor is used.

=== Commercial buildings ===
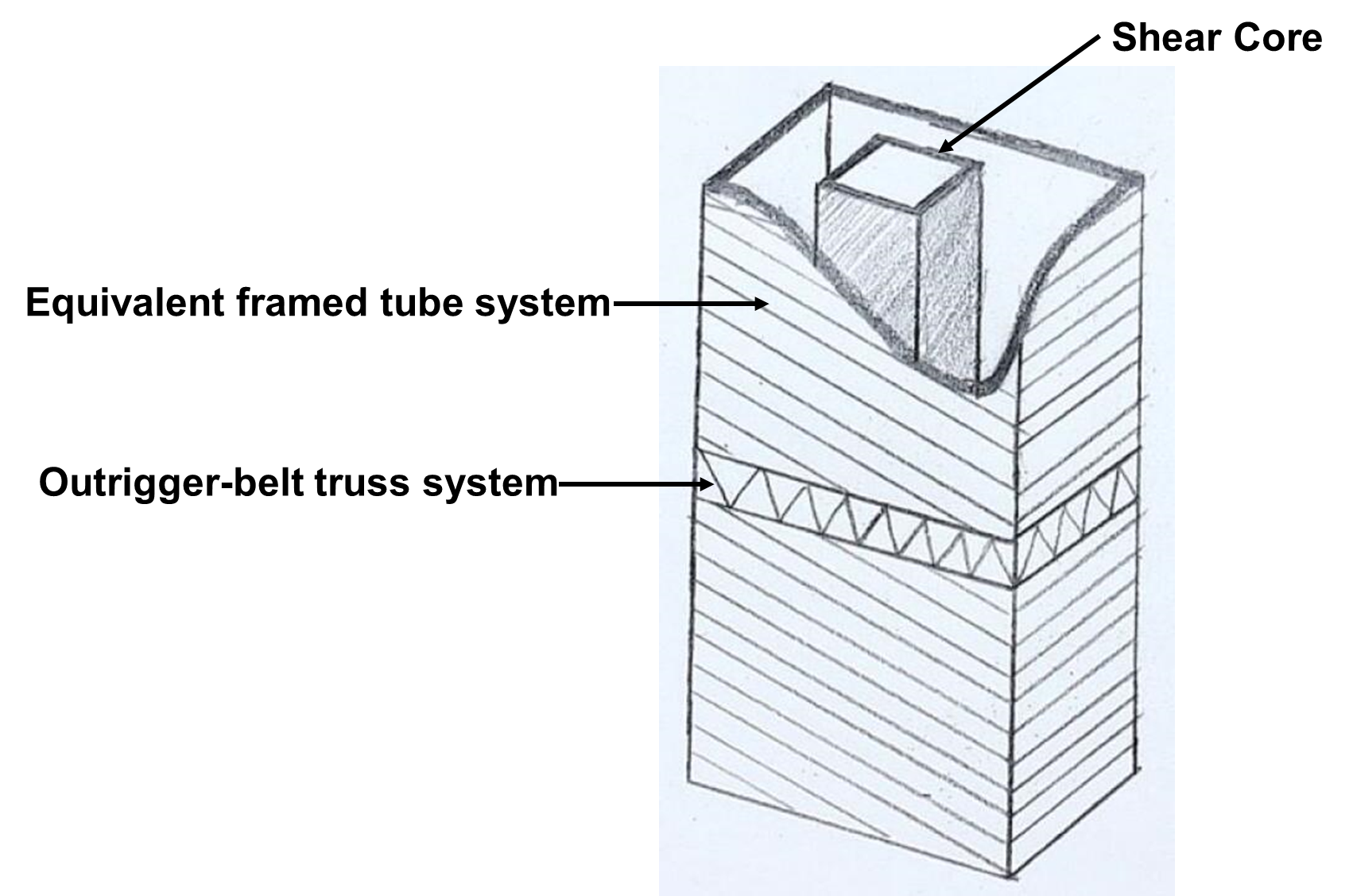
Figure 3 Shear core structure

A structure of shear walls in the center of a large building—often encasing an elevator shaft or stairwell—form a shear core. In multi-storey commercial buildings, shear walls form at least one core (Figure 3). From a building services perspective, the shear core houses communal services including stairs, lifts, toilets and service risers. Building serviceability requirements necessitates a proper arrangement of a shear core. From the structural point of view, a shear core could strengthen the building's resistance to lateral loads, i.e., wind load and seismic load, and significantly increase the building safety.

== Construction methods ==
=== Concrete ===
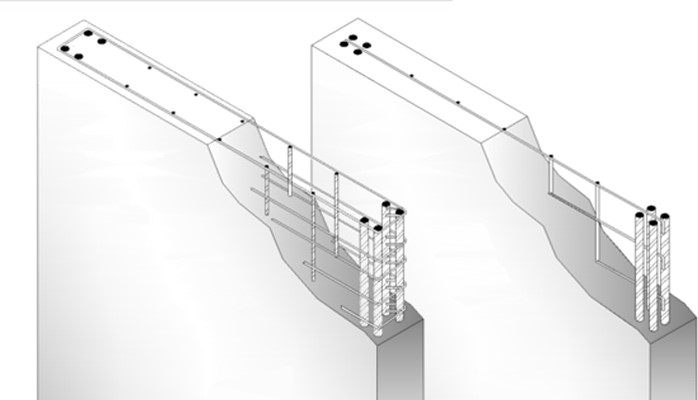
Figure 4 Reinforced concrete shear wall with both horizontal and vertical reinforcement

Concrete shear walls are reinforced with both horizontal and vertical reinforcement (Figure 4). A reinforcement ratio is defined as the ratio of the gross concrete area for a section taken orthogonal to the reinforcement. Construction codes of practice define maximum and minimum amounts of reinforcement as well as the detailing of steel bars. Common construction methods for in-situ reinforced concrete walls include traditional shuttered lifts, slip form, jump form and tunnel form.

=== Shuttered lifts method ===
The traditional shuttered lifts method should be used when the total number of walls is small or the arrangement is irregular. In this method, walls are formed one story at one time together with the columns. Although it is slow, this technique may produce a premium finish quality or texture.

=== Slip form method ===
Slip forming is method of concrete placement whereby a moving form is used to create a continuous wall extrusion. This method is very efficient for well-suited structures, such as flanged and core wall systems. A very accurate wall thickness can be achieved but the surface is rough because of the abrasion of the form on the walls.

=== Jump form method ===
Jump forming, also known as climbing forming, is a method of construction whereby the walls are cast in discrete lifts. It is a stop-start process with day joints formed at each lift level. Similar to slip forming, jump forming is only efficient for structures with repetition of wall arrangement. Moreover, it is convenient for adding connections and extrusions at the floor level due to the discrete features. Nevertheless, the inclusion of day joints leaves higher chances for defects and imperfections.

=== Tunnel form method ===
Tunnel form construction uses a formwork system to cast slabs and walls as a single pour operation. It is suitable for cellular structures with regular repetition of both horizontal and vertical members. The advantage of this method is that the construction can progress vertically and horizontally at the same time, thereby increasing the integrity and stability of the structure.

=== Composite plate shear walls (SpeedCore) ===
Recent advancements in high-rise lateral force resistance include the development of concrete-filled composite steel plate shear walls, often referred to as SpeedCore. This non-proprietary system uses prefabricated outer steel plates connected by cross-tie rods, which act as permanent formwork and structural reinforcement for an inner concrete core. Because the steel panels can be erected concurrently with the rest of the steel framing, the system eliminates the curing delays and temporary formwork required for traditional cast-in-place reinforced concrete cores, accelerating construction schedules.

Initial research adapting composite plate shear walls for commercial building applications and seismic resilience was led by renowned structural engineer Ron Klemencic of Magnusson Klemencic Associates. The research was conducted at Purdue University by structural engineering professor Amit H. Varma and at University at Buffalo by structural engineering professor Michel Bruneau. The system has since been incorporated into the American Institute of Steel Construction (AISC) and American Society of Civil Engineers (ASCE) building standards.

== Nonplanar shear walls ==
Due to functional requirements, the designer may choose nonplanar sections as opposed to the planar sections like rectangular/bar bell sections. Nonplanar sections require 3D analysis and are a research area.

== Modeling techniques ==
Modeling techniques have been progressively updated during the last two decades, moving from linear static to nonlinear dynamic, enabling more realistic representation of global behavior, and different failure modes. Different modeling techniques shear walls span from macro models such as modified beam-column elements, to micro models such as 3D finite element models. An appropriate modeling technique should:

- Be capable of predicting the inelastic response
- Incorporating important materials characteristics
- Simulate behavioural feature: lap splice and bar slip
- Represent the migration of the neutral axis
- Tension stiffening
- Interaction of flexure and shear actions

Different models have been developed over time, including macro-models, vertical line element models, finite-element models, and multi-layer models. More recently, fiber-section beam-columns elements have become popular, as they can model most of the global response and failure modes properly, while avoiding sophistications associated with finite element models.

== Methods of analysis ==
- Finite element method
- Stringer panel model

== See also ==
- Hold down
- Earthquake engineering
