= Donald F. Parsons =

American lawyer

Donald F. Parsons, Jr.

Vice Chancellor, Delaware Court of Chancery
- In office October 22, 2003 – October 2015
- Appointed by: Ruth Ann Minner
- Preceded by: Jack B. Jacobs
- Succeeded by: Tamika Montgomery-Reeves

Personal details
- Born: 20th century
- Education: Lehigh University (BS); Georgetown University Law Center
- Occupation: Judge, lawyer

Donald F. Parsons, Jr. (born 20th century) is an American former judge who served from October 22, 2003 until October 2015 on the Delaware Court of Chancery with the title of Vice Chancellor.

== Education ==
He is a 1977 graduate of the Georgetown University Law Center, located in Washington, D.C., having previously received a Bachelor of Science degree in electrical engineering from Lehigh University, located in Bethlehem, Pennsylvania.

== Career ==
Before joining the Court of Chancery, Parsons spent over twenty-four years at the firm of Morris, Nichols, Arsht & Tunnell in Wilmington, Delaware, where he was a senior partner. While in private practice, he specialized in intellectual property litigation, participated in numerous jury and non-jury patent trials, and wrote several papers relating to intellectual property law.

Before joining Morris, Nichols in 1979, Parsons clerked for the Honorable James L. Latchum of the United States District Court for the District of Delaware. Parsons rejoined Morris, Nichols in March 2016.

He is a past president of the Delaware State Bar Association.

== See also ==
- List of Georgetown University alumni
- List of Lehigh University alumni
- List of patent attorneys and agents
- List of people from Wilmington, Delaware
