= Debbie Lee Wesselmann =

American novelist (born 20th century)

Debbie Lee Wesselmann (born 20th century) is an American novelist.

== Life ==
Born in New York City, Wesselmann has lived in New Jersey, New Hampshire, Rhode Island, and Pennsylvania. She studied at Dartmouth College and Fairleigh Dickinson University, where she later also taught fiction writing. Wesselmann teaches English at Lehigh University in Bethlehem, Pennsylvania.

== Works ==
- The Earth and the Sky (1997) (collection of short stories)
- Trutor and the Balloonist (1997) (novel)
- Captivity (2008) (novel)

== See also ==
- List of American novelists
- List of Dartmouth College alumni
- List of Lehigh University people
- List of people from New Jersey
- List of people from New York City
- List of people from Rhode Island
- List of short-story authors
