= Robert M. Gordon (psychologist) =

American psychologist

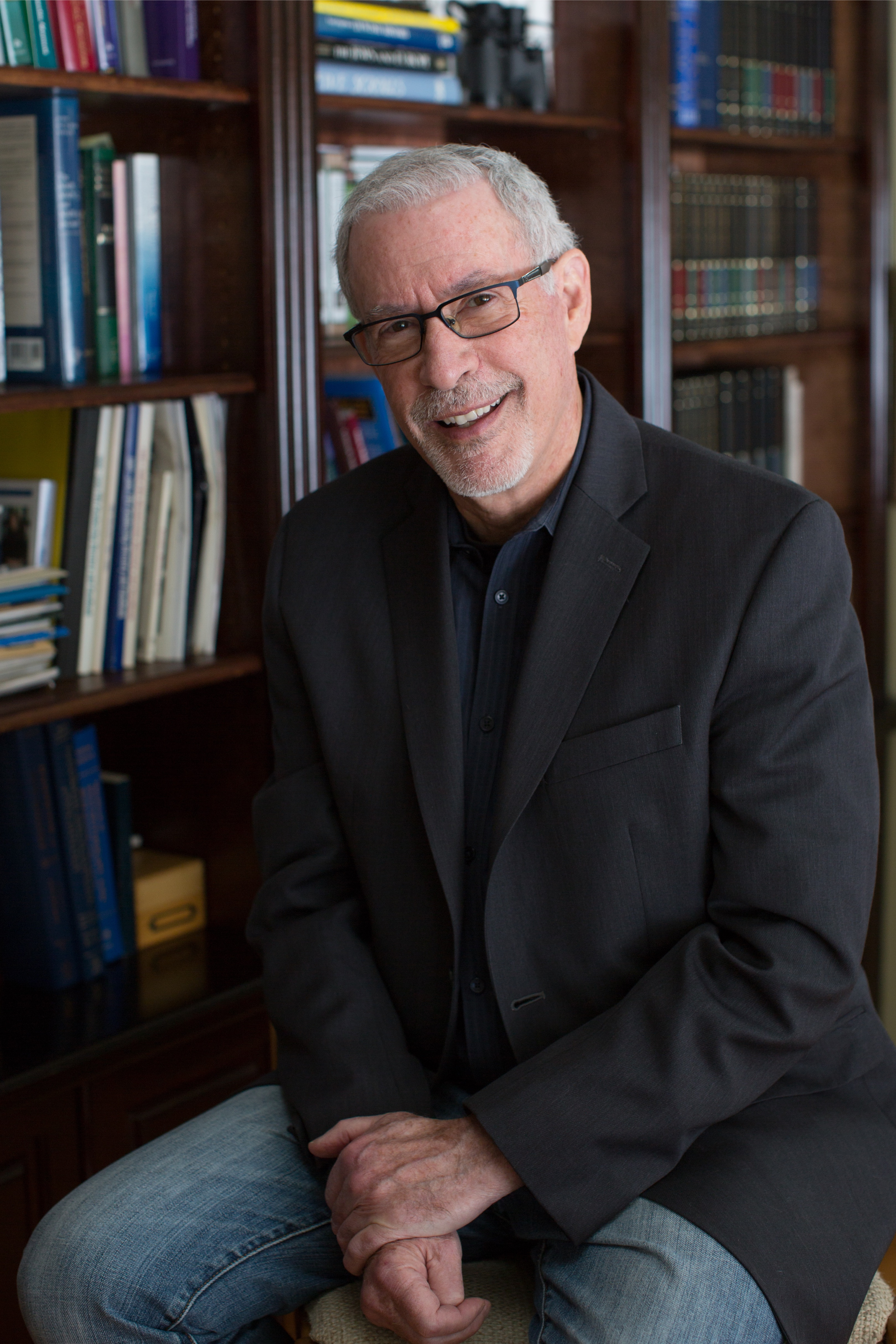
- Born: 1947 (age 78–79)
- Education: Temple University
- Occupation: Psychologist
- Known for: Forensic psychology; Psychodynamic assessment tools
- Awards: APA Honorary Member (2014); IPA Best Study Award (2025)
- Website: www.mmpi-info.com

Robert M. Gordon (born 1947) is an American clinical psychologist, forensic psychologist, and psychoanalyst. He is a diplomate of the American Board of Professional Psychology (ABPP) in both Clinical Psychology and Psychoanalysis.

Gordon's academic work focuses on forensic psychology, personality assessment, and psychoanalytic approaches.

== Education ==
Gordon earned a Ph.D. in Psychology in 1975 from Temple University.

== Career ==
Since 1975, Robert M. Gordon has published peer-reviewed work in forensic psychology and psychodynamic theory, focusing on the application of psychological testing and psychodynamic principles in clinical and forensic settings.

In 1991, Gordon traveled to Israel to assist individuals affected by war-related trauma, contributing psychological support in a humanitarian context.

Gordon served as president of the Pennsylvania Psychological Association (PPA) from 1990 to 1991. He was elected as a representative of Pennsylvania psychologists to the Council of Representatives of the American Psychological Association (APA), serving from 1992 to 1995 and from 2001 to 2003. In 2001, the PPA presented him with its Distinguished Service Award.

== Awards ==
- 2014, Honorary Member of the American Psychoanalytic Association.
- 2025, North American winner of the International Psychoanalytic Association's "Best Published Study in North America" of the year Award for Exceptional Contribution.

== Selected publications ==
- Gordon, R.M. (2024). An Empirical Study of Gauging Political Leadership: Comparing Trump, Putin and Zelenskyy, International Journal for the Advancement of Scientific Empirical Psychoanalytic Research (JASPER), 6(1), 53–65. ISSN 2572-4487, DOI: 10.13140/RG.2.2.24737.72806
- Robert M. Gordon Ph.D. (2024) Amazing Things I've Learned as a Scientist, Therapist, and Forensic Psychologist.ISBN 979-8323130153
- Gordon, R.M., Shi, Z., Scharff, D.E., Fishkin, R.E., & Shelby, R.D. (2021). An International Survey of the Concept of Effective Psychodynamic Treatment During the Pandemic. Psychodynamic Psychiatry,49,3, 453-462. DOI: 10.1521/pdps.2021.49.3.453
- Gordon, R. M., & Bornstein, R. F. (2018). Construct validity of the Psychodiagnostic Chart: A transdiagnostic measure of personality organization, personality syndromes, mental functioning, and symptomatology. Psychoanalytic Psychology, 35(2), 280–288. https://doi.org/10.1037/pap0000142
- Gordon, R.M., & Lan, J. (2017). Assessing Distance Training: How Well Does It Produce Psychoanalytic Psychotherapists? Psychodynamic Psychiatry, 45 (3), 329-341. doi:10.1521/pdps.2017.45.3.329
- Gordon, R.M. & Stoffey, R.W. (2014). Operationalizing the Psychodynamic Diagnostic Manual: a Preliminary Study of the Psychodiagnostic Chart (PDC), Bulletin of the Menninger Clinic,78,1, 1-15. https://doi.org/10.1521/bumc.2014.78.1.1
- Gordon, R.M. & Cosgrove, L., (2013) Ethical Considerations in the Development and Application of Mental and Behavioral Nosologies: Lessons from DSM5, Psychological Injury and Law, 6,4, 330-335, DOI 10.1007/s12207-013-9172-9
- Gordon, R.M. (2010). The Psychodynamic Diagnostic Manual (PDM). In I. Weiner and E. Craighead, (Eds.) Corsini’s Encyclopedia of Psychology (4^{th} ed., volume 3, 1312-1315), Hoboken, NJ: John Wiley and Sons. doi.org/10.1108/09504121011066941
- Gordon, R.M., Gazzillo, F., Blake, A., Bornstein, R.F., Etzi, J., Lingiardi, V., McWilliams, N., Rothery, C. & Tasso, A.F. (2016) The Relationship Between Theoretical Orientation and Countertransference Awareness: Implications for Ethical Dilemmas and Risk Management, Clinical Psychology & Psychotherapy, 23, 3,236-245; (online published 2015, DOI: 10.1002/cpp.1951)
- Gordon, R. M., Stoffey, R. W., & Bottinelli, J. (2008). MMPI‑2 findings of primitive defenses in alienating parents. American Journal of Family Therapy, 36(3), 211–228.
- Gordon, R. M. (2001). MMPI/MMPI‑2 changes in long‑term psychoanalytic psychotherapy. Psychoanalytic Psychology, 23(1–2), 59–79.
- Gordon, R. M. (1976). "Effects of volunteering and responsibility on the perceived value and effectiveness of a clinical treatment". Journal of Consulting and Clinical Psychology. 44, 799–801
- Gordon, R. M. (1975). Effects of interpersonal and economic resources upon values and the quality of life. Dissertation Abstracts International, 36, 3122B. (University Microfilms No. 75–28, 220).
