= The Fight to Save Juárez =

2013 book by Ricardo C. Ainslie

- First edition
- Author: Ricardo C. Ainslie
- Subject: Mexican drug war
- Genre: Non-fiction
- Publisher: University of Texas Press
- Publication date: 2013

The Fight to Save Juárez: Life in the Heart of Mexico's Drug War is a 2013 book by Ricardo C. Ainslie, a professor at the University of Texas at Austin. It is published by the University of Texas Press and documents the Mexican drug war in Ciudad Juárez in the years 2008-2010.

== Synopsis ==
Mayor of Juárez Jose Reyes Ferriz is a central figure in the book. He, along with newspaper reporter Raymundo Ruiz, human rights ombudsman Gustavo de la Rosa, and a mistress named "Elena" are four major sources. Interviews from these sources and others were used in the book. The Villas de Salvárcar massacre is described in this book.

== Author's background ==
The author has dual U.S.-Mexican citizenship and is a filmmaker. He also works at the University of Texas at Austin as a professor of educational psychology. Ainslie was able to connect with not only regular people but also politicians and activists as part of his research.

== Reception ==
Candace E. Griffith of West Virginia University wrote that the book can cater to a wide audience, from politicians to ordinary people.

Kirkus Reviews concluded that the book is "A hard-nosed, cleareyed analysis of a legacy of institutionalized corruption and its dire consequences for human lives."

Publishers Weekly stated "Although not easy to read, this is an important work for any reader concerned about Mexico."
