= Anthropologie =

American clothing retailer

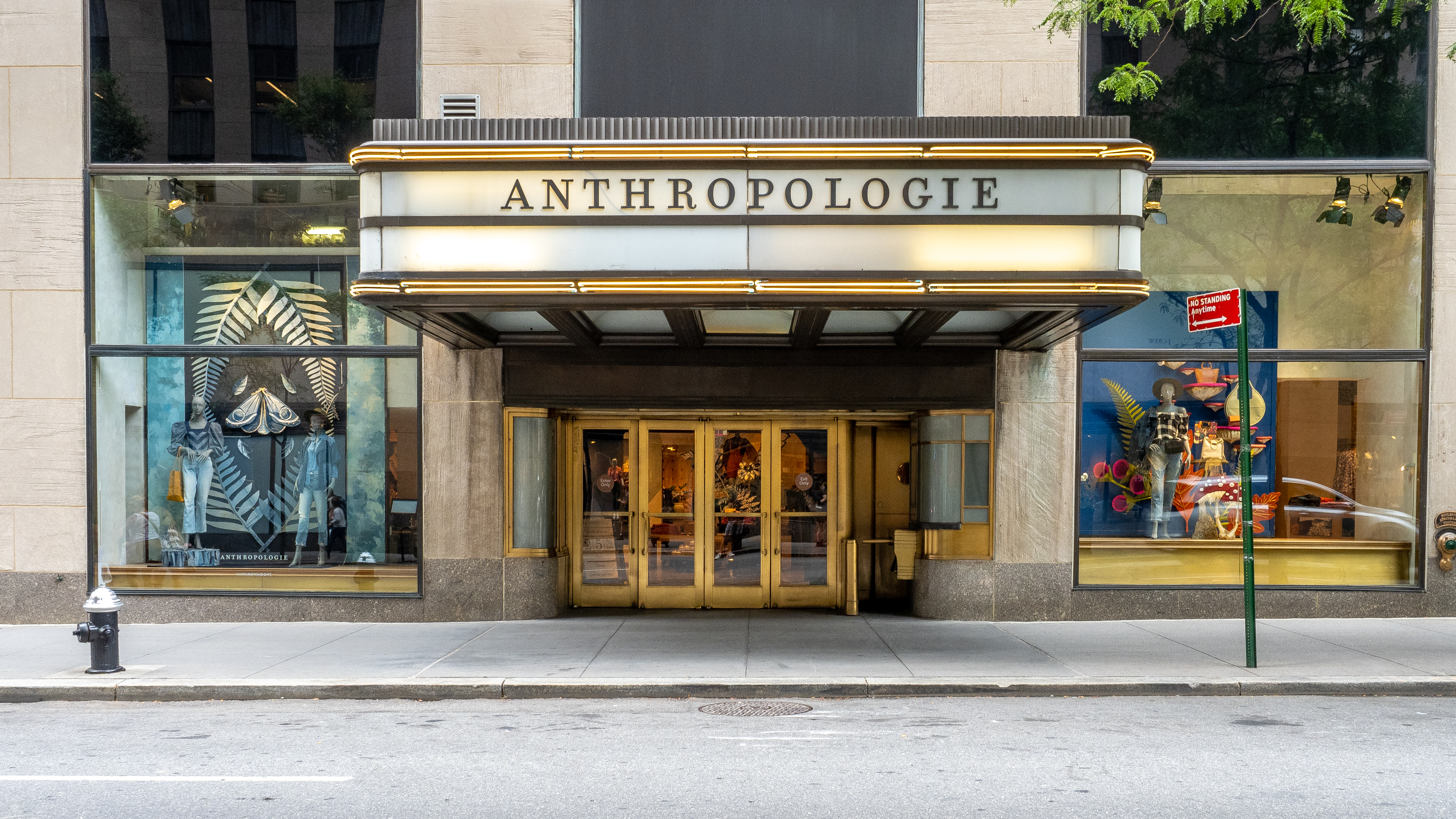
- Anthropologie store in Rockefeller Center
- Type: Subsidiary
- Industry: Retail
- Founded: October 31, 1992; 33 years ago Wayne, Pennsylvania, U.S.
- Founder: Richard Hayne
- Headquarters: Philadelphia, Pennsylvania, U.S.
- Number of locations: 216 (September 2015)
- Key people: Tricia Smith (CEO)
- Products: Clothing; accessories; cosmetics; footwear; houseware
- Parent: Urban Outfitters (1992–present)
- Website: anthropologie.com

Anthropologie is an American retailer operating in the U.S., Canada, France, Germany and the UK that sells clothing, jewelry, home furniture, decorations, beauty products, and gifts.

Anthropologie is part of Urban Outfitters brands, which includes Urban Outfitters itself, Free People, BHLDN, and Terrain.

== History ==
In 1970, former Lehigh University roommates and later University of Pennsylvania Wharton Business School classmates Richard Hayne and Scott Belair needed a project for an entrepreneurial class. They decided to open a retail store called Free People. According to some sources, Hayne's ex-wife Judy Wicks co-founded the company with him. After opening another store, Urban Outfitters, Hayne worked the concept behind Anthropologie, aiming to sell products targeting 30 to 45-year-old women.

In the autumn of 1992, Anthropologie opened its first free-standing store in a refurbished automobile shop in Wayne, Pennsylvania. In 1998, the brand launched a mail-order catalog as well as a website. In 2009, Anthropologie opened its first international store in London, England. It followed the other brands in URBN in expanding to the United Kingdom. Also in 2009, Anthropologie opened its first Canadian outlet at the Shops at Don Mills, a shopping centre in Toronto.

In 2018, following an exposé of the mohair industry in South Africa, Anthropologie joined other fashion retailers in banning the sale of products containing goat-derived fur. In October 2019, Urban Outfitters announced the opening of Anthropologie Home Outlet in Pittsburgh, which focuses only on home furnishings. In 2020, Anthropologie became a target of protests when it ignored calls from PETA to ban the sale of items made with alpaca hair.

In April 2021, Hillary Super stepped down as CEO of Anthropologie, and Tricia D. Smith, who had served 26 years at Nordstrom, took over as Anthropologie's global CEO.

As of 2025, there are 253 Anthropologie stores nation wide.

== Collaborations ==
Anthropologie had partners with various artists and designers worldwide for its products. Collaborators have included Tracy Reese, Peter Som, Collette Dinnigan, Mara Hoffman, Liya Kebede, Byron Lars, Ekaterina Kukhareva, Chris Benz, Kit Kemp, Vera Neumann, Amber Lewis, Joanna Gaines and Claire Desjardins.
