= Free People =

American bohemian apparel and lifestyle retail company

- Type: Subsidiary
- Industry: Retail
- Founded: 1984
- Founder: Dick Hayne
- Products: Apparel, accessories, shoes, intimates, swimwear
- Services: Apparel & Fashion
- Parent: Urban Outfitters

Free People is an American bohemian apparel and lifestyle retail company that sells women's clothing, accessories, shoes, intimates, and swimwear. It also has a beauty and wellness category, which includes products such as cosmetics, skin, and oral care, oral supplements, crystals, and books. Their headquarters is located in Philadelphia, Pennsylvania, and Free People is a part of Urban Outfitters, Inc., along with Anthropologie, BHLDN, Terrain, and the Vetri family restaurant group.

Today, Free People sells their line in 1,400 specialty stores worldwide. The brand is distributed globally via direct channels, including the Free People Global site, and Free People UK site, as well as specialty clothing boutiques, department stores, and the brand’s freestanding retail locations in the U.S. and Canada.

== History ==
In the early 1970s, Richard Hayne opened a store in West Philadelphia, Pennsylvania, with his first wife, Judy Wicks, and named it Free People. His store attracted the young people who lived and shopped in the area. When its popularity grew, he opened a second store, and he changed its name from Free People to Urban Outfitters. Urban Outfitters’ business began to grow rapidly. Dick’s then wife, Meg, oversaw the development of Urban Outfitters’ private label division, which supported product exclusive to Urban Outfitters. This proved to be quite successful; by 1984, the wholesale line "Free People" was back in action.

In the fall of 2002, the first Free People Boutique opened in Paramus, New Jersey. Since the first boutique opened, there are now boutiques all over the United States and Canada. Free People developed an app which allows users to shop and to upload their own looks and pictures wearing Free People clothing and products.

In 2006, Free People partnered with Ed Mullen Studio to design an e-commerce strategy.

As of 2021, Free People sells in over 1,400 specialty stores worldwide. Some department stores, such as Nordstrom and Bloomingdale's, have created in-store concept shops.

Along with serving as Urban Outfitters' chief creative officer, Margaret Hayne is also currently chief executive of Free People.

In the first six months of 2013, sales topped $180 million, an increase over the $135 million in 2012; the company's use of big data and social commerce were factors in its sales growth.

== Boutiques and showrooms ==
Free People has a total of 136 free standing boutiques across the United States and Canada. The company also operates wholesale a pop-up showroom located in the United Kingdom: the only store outside of North America. There are shows every month. It also sells its clothing to independent boutiques within Canada. The company's flagship, resides in Rockefeller Center, NYC. It is Free People's largest standing store, but it is not much different from the other brick and mortar stores. The theme and vibe of the brand is apparent from store to store.

== Controversies ==
In May 2015, the company was criticized online by professional ballet dancers for using an untrained dancer in an ad.

In April 2016, the company was criticized for the advertisements of its new clothing line directed towards music festival attendees. The advertisements promoted Native American styled clothing on a Caucasian model, which garnered criticism on social media.

== Sponsored Athletes ==
Free People lists the following athletes as brand ambassadors as of February 2025.

Dance

- Rylee Arnold

Tennis

- Sloane Stephens
- Danielle Collins
- Sofia Kenin
- Emma Navarro

Track & Field

- Nonah Waldron

Rock Climbing

- Sasha DiGiulian

Previously sponsored athletes include: Quanesha Burks, Jessie Knight, Annie Kunz, Inanna Sarkis, Brooklyn Courtnall, and Emily Arthur.
