= Tucker (crater) =

Crater on the Moon

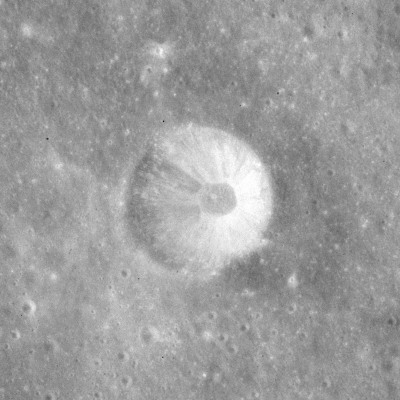
- Apollo 15 mapping camera image
- Coordinates: 5.62°S 88.21°E
- Diameter: 6.78 km
- Depth: 1.6 km
- Colongitude: 272° at sunrise
- Eponym: Richard H. Tucker

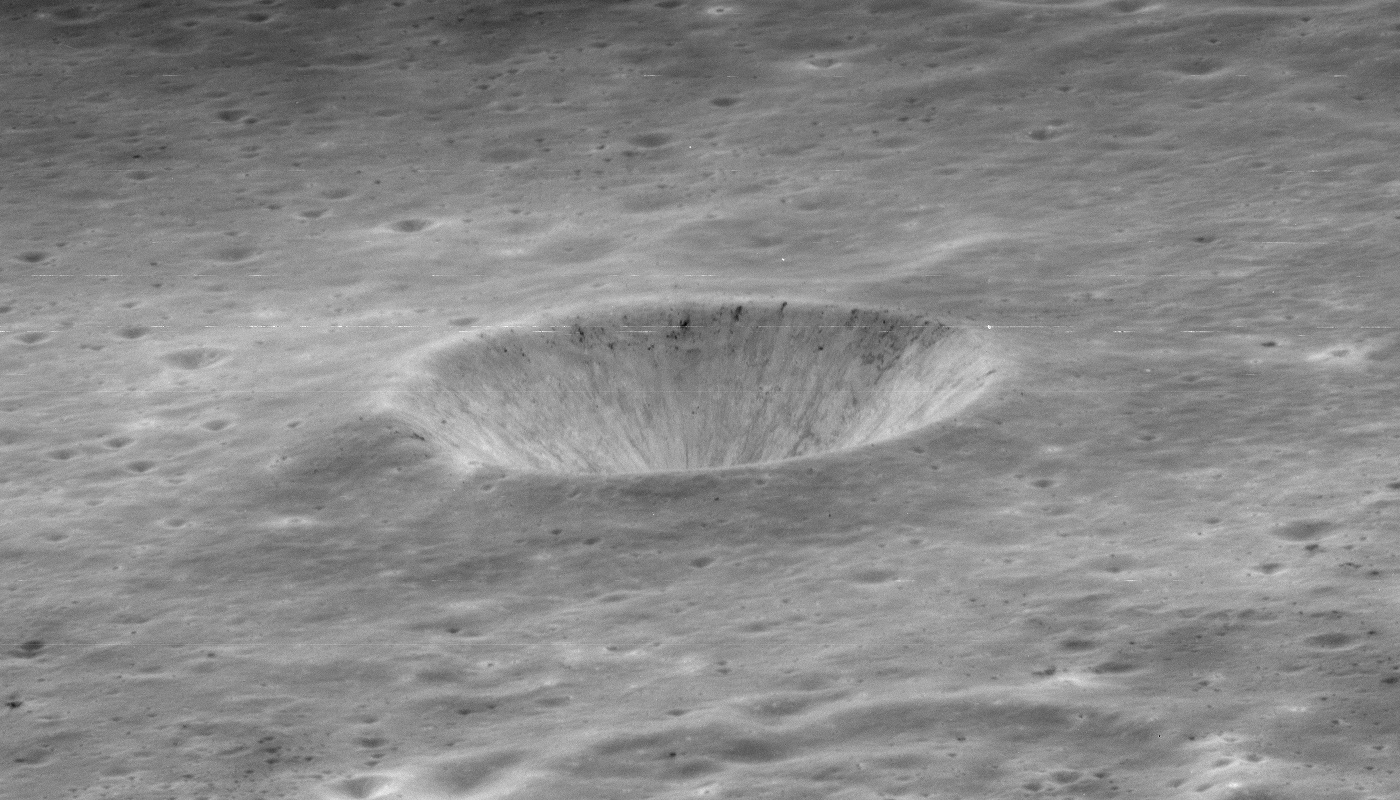
Oblique view from Apollo 17

Tucker is a small lunar impact crater in the southern part of the Mare Smythii. It is located along the eastern limb of the Moon, and from the Earth it is seen nearly from the edge. It lies between the slightly larger crater Lebesgue to the northeast and the flooded Kao to the south-southwest.

This is a small, circular crater formation that is cup-shaped and has a higher albedo than the surrounding dark lunar mare. It is one of the brighter features in the surroundings, which is indicative of a relatively youthful feature that has not undergone significant space weathering. The crater is not significantly eroded or overlain by craters of significance.

The crater's name was approved by the IAU in 1979.
