= Sirry Alang =

Cameroonian-American medical sociologist

Sirry M. Alang
- Education: University of Minnesota
- Scientific career
- Workplaces: Lehigh University
- Thesis: Culture and the Stress Process: Understanding Mental Health among African Americans (2015)

Sirry Alang is a Cameroonian-American health services researcher examining the structural causes of health inequity and the social determinants of health. A medical sociologist, she is also an Associate Professor of Sociology and Health, Medicine and Society at Lehigh University.

== Early life and education ==
Alang is from Cameroon. Her mother, Margaret M. Tanni, raised her and encouraged her to pursue an academic career. Alang earned her first degree in Sociology and Anthropology at the University of Buea. She moved to the United States as a graduate student, where she studied sociology at Lehigh University under an F visa. After earning her master's degree, Alang moved to the University of Minnesota, where she studied in the Division of Health Policy and Management and obtained a Ph.D. in Health Services Research, Policy and Administration. Her dissertation about mental health, supervised by Donna McAlpine, was an ethnography in a predominantly Black neighbourhood where she first witnessed the impact of police violence. While finishing her Ph.D., Alang worked as a Principal Planning Analyst in the Hennepin County Public Health department.

== Research and career ==
Alang joined the faculty at Lehigh University in 2015, where she investigates structural racism in the healthcare system and how this impacts the delivery and outcome of health services. She is a founding co-director of the Institute of Critical Race and Ethnic Studies at Lehigh University and the Chair of the Health Justice Collaborative. In 2019 she was named a Campus Compact Engaged Scholar.

Alang investigated the health impacts of police brutality and how it impacts trust in medical institutions. She and her colleagues found that people who had experienced negative encounters with the police had higher levels of mistrust in the medical system. In an interview with Inverse, Alang said, "When people mistrust the healthcare system, they don't want to use the healthcare system. They don't want to engage in care. That's a big problem, and police brutality increases that". Throughout the COVID-19 pandemic, Alang investigated the disproportionate impact of coronavirus disease on communities of colour. After the murder of George Floyd, Alang provided expert commentary to the media on the public health impact of police brutality. She wrote about the role of white communities in confronting structural racism, in speaking up, calling out discrimination and taking action to stand up for racial justice. Beyond societal racism, Alang has investigated racism in higher education.

In September 2020, Alang tweeted to call for teachers to become more aware of their language and sensitive to the fact that children could be living in single parent homes, or ones with two mothers or two fathers. The tweet went viral, and was covered across international media.

== Select publications ==
- Alang, Sirry; McAlpine, Donna; McCreedy, Ellen; Hardeman, Rachel (2017). "Police Brutality and Black Health: Setting the Agenda for Public Health Scholars". American Journal of Public Health. 107 (5): 662–665. doi:10.2105/ajph.2017.303691. ISSN 0090-0036. PMC 5388955. PMID 28323470.
- Alang, Sirry M.; McCreedy, Ellen M.; McAlpine, Donna D. (2015-12-01). "Race, Ethnicity, and Self-Rated Health Among Immigrants in the United States". Journal of Racial and Ethnic Health Disparities. 2 (4): 565–572. doi:10.1007/s40615-015-0106-y. ISSN 2196-8837. PMID 26863562.
- Alang, Sirry M. (2015). "Sociodemographic disparities associated with perceived causes of unmet need for mental health care". Psychiatric Rehabilitation Journal. 38 (4): 293–299. doi:10.1037/prj0000113. PMID 25664758.
