= Urban Outfitters =

Multinational retail chain founded in the United States

Urban Outfitters, Inc.

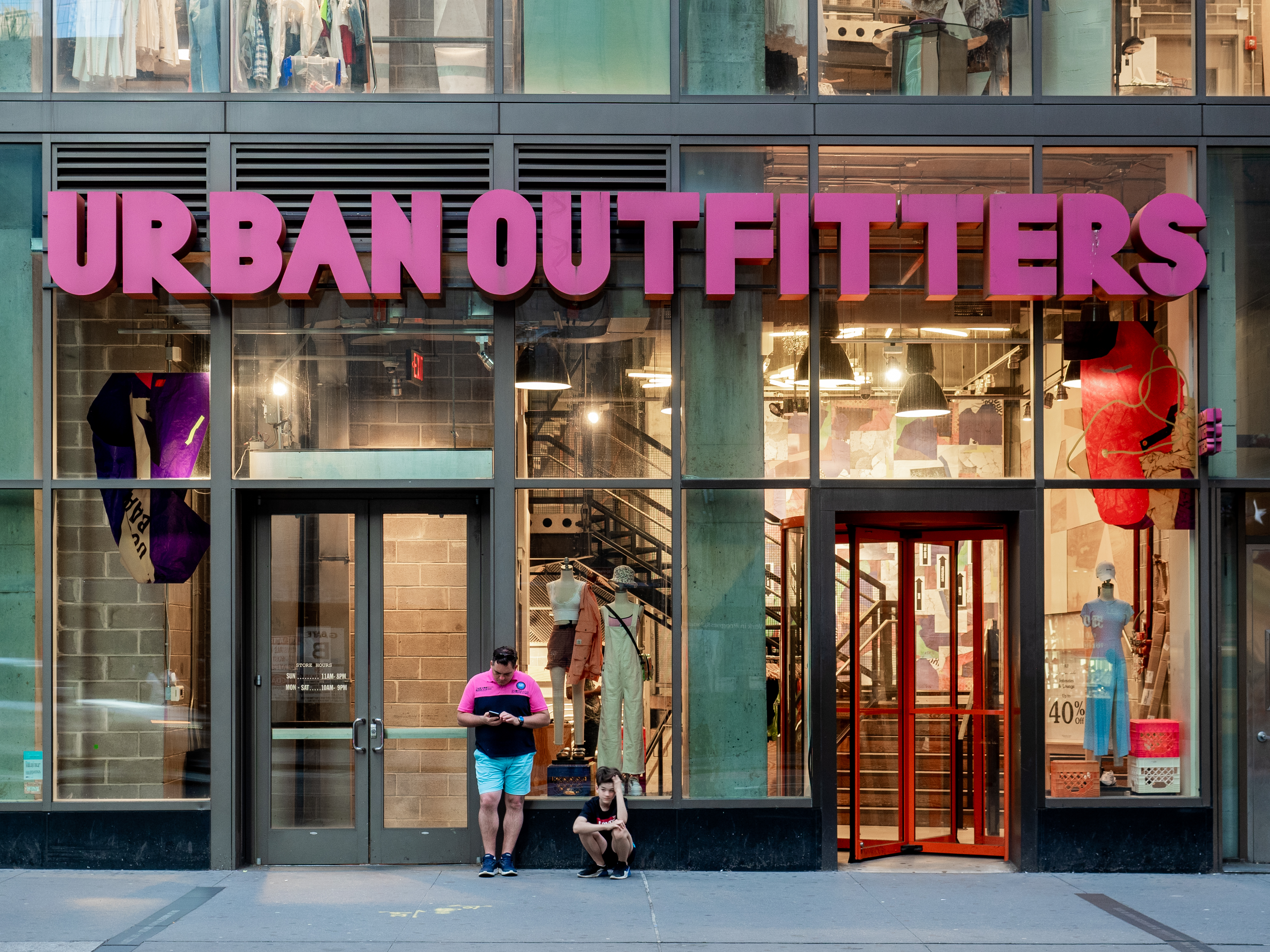
- Urban Outfitters store in Lower Manhattan, New York
- Type: Public
- Traded as: Nasdaq: URBN; S&P 600 component
- Industry: Retail
- Founded: 1970; 56 years ago, in Philadelphia, Pennsylvania, U.S. (as Free People)
- Founders: Richard Hayne; Judy Wicks; Scott Belair
- Headquarters: Philadelphia, Pennsylvania, U.S.
- Number of locations: 700 (2023)
- Area served: United States; India; Belgium; Canada; Denmark; France; Germany; Ireland; Italy; Netherlands; Pakistan; Sweden; United Kingdom; Spain; Italy; Austria; Poland; United Arab Emirates; Qatar
- Key people: Richard Hayne (CEO)
- Products: Clothing; accessories; cosmetics; footwear; housewares; music
- Revenue: ▲US$3.9 billion (2019)
- Operating income: ▼US$231 million (2019)
- Net income: ▼US$168 million (2019)
- Total assets: ▲US$3.3 billion (2019)
- Total equity: ▼US$1.4 billion (2019)
- Owner: Richard Hayne (19.9%)
- Number of employees: 24,000 (2019)
- Subsidiaries: Anthropologie; Free People; Terrain; BHLDN; The Vetri Family
- Website: Commercial website; Corporate website

Urban Outfitters, Inc. is a multinational lifestyle retail corporation headquartered in Philadelphia, Pennsylvania. Operating in the United States, the United Kingdom, Canada, select Western European countries, Poland, the United Arab Emirates, and Qatar, the Urban Outfitters brand targets young adults with a merchandise mix of women's and men's fashion apparel, footwear, beauty and wellness products, accessories, activewear and gear, and housewares, as well as music, primarily vinyl records and cassettes.

The company was founded as the retail store Free People by Richard Hayne, Judy Wicks and Scott Belair in 1970 as a project for an entrepreneurship class at University of Pennsylvania. It was renamed to Urban Outfitters and incorporated in 1976.

Urban Outfitters carries multiple stores within its portfolio of brands, which also includes Urban Outfitters itself, Anthropologie, Free People, Terrain, BHLDN and the Vetri Family restaurant group. Much of the merchandise is designed and produced by the company's wholesale division on these multiple private labels.

== History ==
In the 1970s, Scott Belair & Dick Hayne opened a store and called it Free People in West Philadelphia, Pennsylvania. As the store eventually grew from one to two storefronts, the name was changed from Free People to Urban Outfitters.

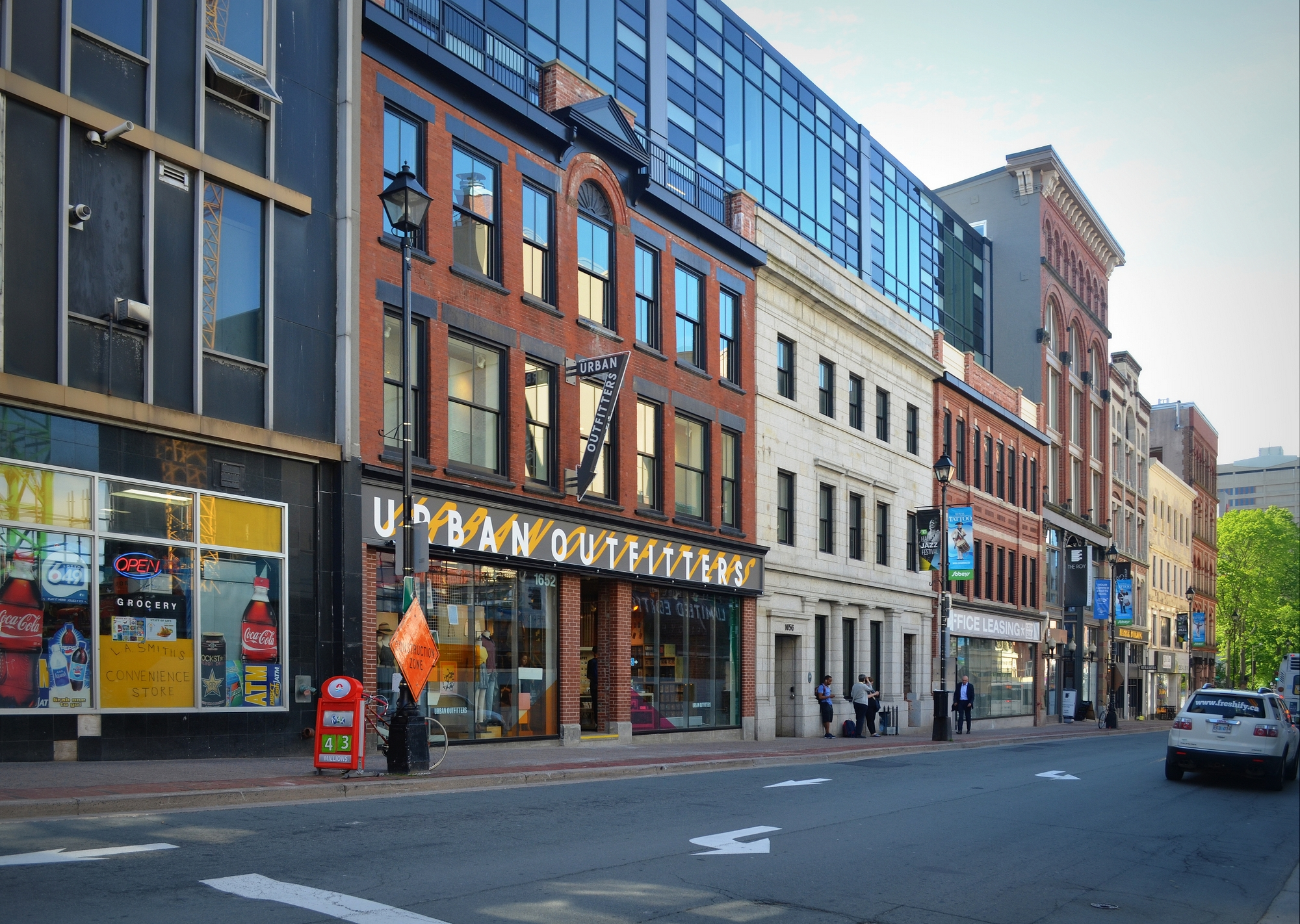
Urban Outfitters store in Halifax, Nova Scotia

In 2007, the company received the National Preservation Honor Award from the National Trust for Historic Preservation for the Urban Outfitters Corporate Office Campus located on the Philadelphia Naval Shipyard.

In 2011, it agreed to sell limited editions of Polaroid ONE600 instant cameras and Type 779 instant film in partnership with the Austrian entrepreneur Florian Kaps, who acquired the rights to manufacture 700 copies of the defunct product. In January 2013, it hired the Abraham & Roetzel lobbying firm, led by former Republican Sen. Spencer Abraham, to advocate on its behalf in Washington, D.C., regarding retail industry policy.

In Q4 2015, the company announced plans to acquire the Vetri Family, a Philadelphia restaurant group. As the company was facing declining same store sales and foot traffic, the acquisition illustrated the retailer's shift in strategy. This includes restaurants Amis Trattoria, Bar Amis, and Pizzeria Vetri. There are two Pizzeria Vetri locations in Philadelphia, with other locations in King of Prussia, Pennsylvania, Devon, Pennsylvania and Washington, D.C.

In 2019, the company drew attention by announcing the sale of used VHS tapes for $40. In the same year, Urban Outfitters launched Nuuly, a subscription clothing rental service. Following that, the company launched Nuuly Thrift, a resale platform for buying and selling women's, men's and kids’ apparel and accessories from URBN labels and other brands.

As of 2020, Urban Outfitters does not publicly disclose which factories produce the brand's clothing. It also has no human resources department.

In December 2022, Urban Outfitters announced the departure of its president, Francis Pierrel, from the company.

== Criticism ==
Urban Outfitters' products have also been the subject of multiple complaints and criticism, largely from religious, ethical, and ethnic pressure groups including a local chapter of the NAACP, Anti-Defamation League and Navajo Nation for some of their products.

In January 2007, Urban Outfitters stopped selling keffiyehs after Jewish blogging site Jewschool called out the company for describing the item as an "anti-war woven scarf".

=== Labor practices ===
On November 27, 2009, Urban Outfitters drew the attention of the Swedish press for denying collective bargaining rights to employees at their Stockholm store by making all 38 workers redundant and re-hiring them through employment agency Academic Work. In response to the move, ombudsman Jimmy Ekman called for tougher laws to prevent other firms denying collective bargaining rights in this way.

In 2019, a former executive of Chinese descent with 40 years at the company sued it for ethnic and age-based discrimination.

In 2021, the company only received a score of 11–20% in the Fashion Transparency Index. There is also no evidence of Urban Outfitters ensuring the paying of living wages to their employees.
