= Patrice Banks =

American engineer and founder of the Girls Auto Clinic Repair Center

- Born: Patrice Banks; Phoenixville
- Education: Lehigh University Bethlehem, Pennsylvania
- Occupation: Engineer-Auto Technician
- Known for: founder of the Girls Auto Clinic Repair Center

Patrice Banks is an engineer turned auto technician who in 2017 founded the Girls Auto Clinic Repair Center, a Pennsylvania-based auto repair center that caters to women clientele, is staffed by women mechanics, and has a nail salon for manicure and pedicure services. In 2017, she published Girls Auto Clinic Glove Box Guide, which covers the basics of auto repairs, maintenance, and emergencies. Banks was previously a material science engineer at DuPont.

== Early life and education ==
Banks grew up poor in a working-class family in Phoenixville, Pennsylvania. She is biracial, the daughter of a single mother, and the first in her family to graduate from high school and college. She worked three jobs in high school and bought her first car at age 16, viewing it as an escape from an abusive household; her grandfather taught her how to drive. An honors student at Phoenixville High School, she did well in math and science classes and considered engineering as a career at the suggestion of her mother. An early influence was an African-American industrial engineer whom she shadowed as he made his rounds selling machinery to businesses.

Banks attended Lehigh University in Bethlehem, Pennsylvania, on a $32,000 scholarship. She initially majored in chemical engineering before switching to material science. Graduating in 2002, she accepted a job at DuPont headquarters in Wilmington, Delaware, heading a lab that performed failure analysis on manufacturing equipment. Part of her job entailed climbing towers to check on tanks of hydrochloric acid. She worked there for 12 years.

== Career ==
In a 2015 Washington Post op-ed, Banks explained why she became an auto mechanic, trading a six-figure salary, "high heels and an air-conditioned office for boots, Dickies and grime-covered hands". She had grown "tired of feeling like an auto airhead and getting scammed by the male-dominated car-care industry." She cited her own experiences, including an overprescribed transmission job by the dealer on her two-year-old SUV, as well surveys showing that women are routinely quoted for unnecessary repairs and charged more for service, even though they hold the majority of U.S. driver licenses and spend more time on the road than men. Banks had unsuccessfully searched for a woman mechanic and subsequently learned that they represent less than 2 percent of the profession. "I saw a major business opportunity in the auto industry’s gender gap".

To make the transition, she attended night classes at Delaware Technical Community College. She was the only woman in the program and more than a decade older than her fellow students. She learned how to run a shop by working for free at a small repair shop and then a larger one. A job offer from the latter spurred her to quit her job at DuPont. She also held workshops to help women learn the basics of car repair and maintenance, including what questions to ask and how to negotiate a price.

In 2015, Banks gave a TEDx Talk titled, "How I Plan to Disrupt the Automotive Industry in Red Heels".

Banks opened Girls Auto Clinic in Upper Darby, Pennsylvania in January 2017. A year later, she employed five women mechanics, each of whom had contacted her about entering the profession. In a former parts storage room, Banks opened the Clutch Beauty Bar, a salon offering customers manicures, pedicures, and blowouts while they wait. The idea was inspired by a Jiffy Lube shop she frequented together with the nail salon next door. Women make up about 75 percent of Banks' clientele. Her shop's logo is a red stiletto with a crescent wrench serving as the heel.

In September 2017, Banks published Girls Auto Clinic Glove Box Guide. In a New York Times review, Judith Newman wrote:

Explaining that a woman’s relationship to her car should be like a relationship to her partner — heavy on the communication and the commitment — Banks gives us the basics here: the parts, how they operate, what you can fix yourself, and perhaps most important, how not to be cheated (by knowing how much various repair jobs should cost). It’s simply written, it’s not condescending or cutesy, and it removes the mystery from something that many of us find a little scary.

In 2019, the Auto Clinic inspired Patty's Auto, a television pilot considered but passed on by Fox.

== Personal life ==
Banks married in 2019. The ceremony took place at the Girls Auto Clinic Repair Center, located in the building she had purchased two years before.
