= Deming Lewis =

American university president

W. Deming Lewis
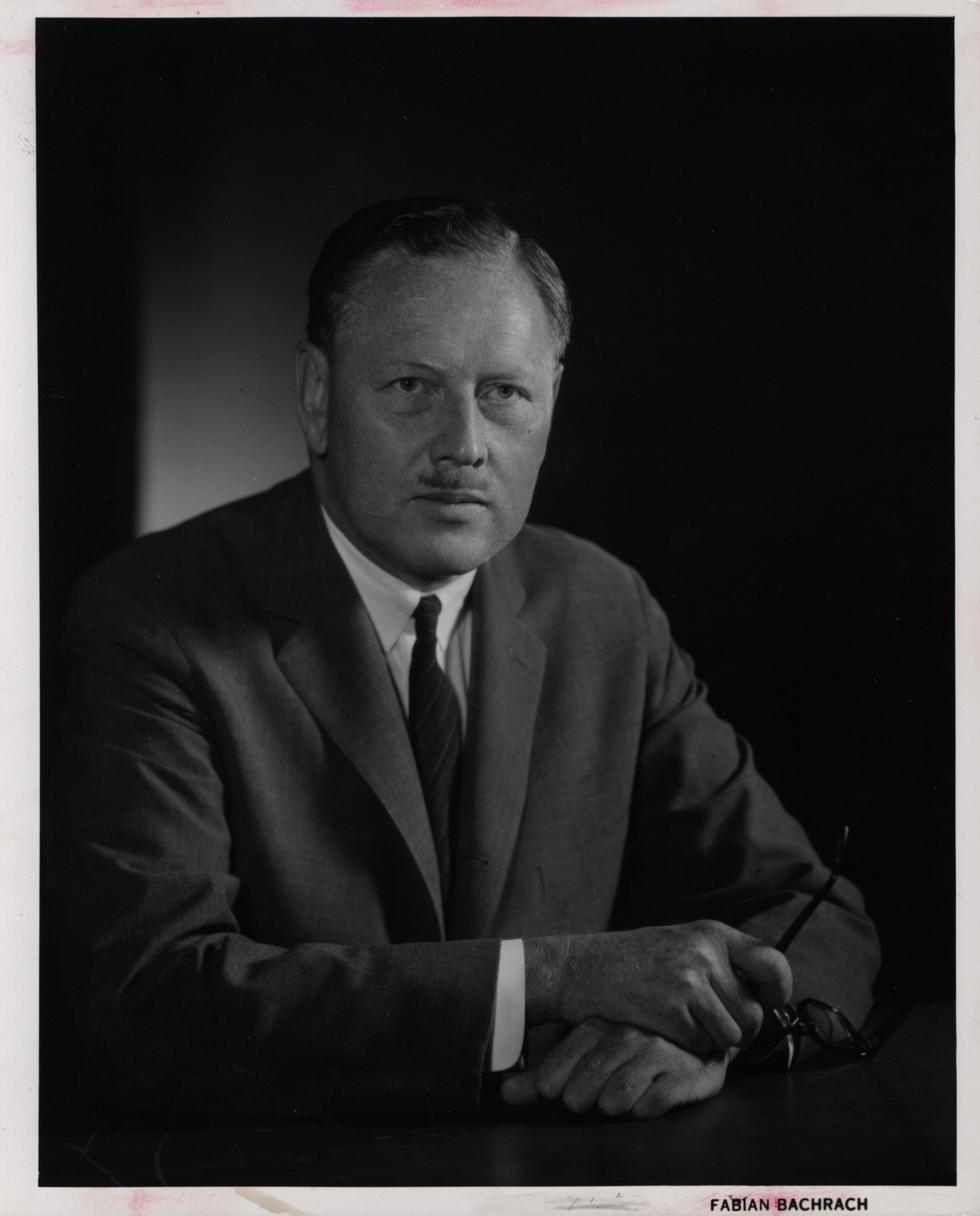
- Portrait c.1960
- Born: Willard Deming Lewis; 1915; Augusta, Georgia
- Died: April 19, 1989 (Age 74); Bethlehem, Pennsylvania
- Other name: Deming Lewis
- Education: Harvard University; Oxford University
- Occupation: Academic
- Years active: 1941-1982
- Known for: President of Lehigh University
- Children: 5 (Biological); 2 (Step-children)

Willard Deming Lewis was an American academic who served as the tenth president of Lehigh University from 1964 to 1982. During which most of the modern campus of Lehigh was constructed, earning him the moniker of the man who "made Lehigh great."

== Biography ==
=== Early life ===
Lewis was born in 1915 to Willard Lewis, and Constance née Deming in Augusta, Georgia. At the age of 16 Lewis enrolled at Harvard University, where he earned a B.A., M.A., and Ph.D. in physics. He was also a member of the Harvard Crimson men's squash team and tennis team. A Rhodes Scholar in advanced mathematics, he also received two additional degrees at Oxford University.

In 1941, Deming joined Bell Telephone Laboratories, eventually becoming director of communications systems. During his time at Bell, Deming had thirty-three U.S. patents to his name on components and systems such as microwave filters, antennas, and digital error detection. Lewis also managed the team that pioneered telephone switching systems. In 1962, NASA asked Bell to form a systems engineering organization to guide the Apollo program, with Lewis being one of the four Bell leaders who managed this effort for Bellcomm.

=== Lehigh ===
Lewis was installed as Lehigh University's president on October 11, 1964, with his first action being a visit to the Ford Foundation. During this visit, one of the directors of the foundation called Lehigh “the big college that calls itself a university,” which personally annoyed Lewis. During Lewis' tenure in 1971 Lehigh admitted its first female undergraduates. New majors were begun in natural science, biology, social relations, geological sciences, environmental science and resource management, religion studies, computer engineering, computing and information science, applied mathematics, management science, American studies, and other fields. Additionally, six research centers and seven institutes were established. Lewis oversaw fundraising efforts which gained the school $130 million, which was used to build Maginnes Hall, Whitaker Lab, Mart Science and Engineering Library, Sinclair Lab, the Seeley G. Mudd Building, Neville Hall, Rathbone Hall dining room, 13 fraternity houses, the Centennial I and Centennial II residential complexes, the Brodhead House residence hall, the Trembley Park student apartments, the Saucon Village apartments, the Philip Rauch Field House, and the Stabler Athletic and Convocation Center as well as renovating and restoring Packer Memorial Church and Packard Lab.

Lewis simultaneously served as a charter member of the Polaris Command and Communications Committee and the Defense Industry Advisory Committee as well as being named to the Naval Research Advisory Committee by the Secretary of the Navy, and was a consultant to the President's Scientific Advisory Committee part of the U.S. Office of Science, Research, Development. He also served as the chairman of the Pennsylvania State Board of Education. Lewis also served as chairman of the Pennsylvania Commission for Independent Colleges and Universities and was President of the Lehigh Valley Association of Independent Colleges. Lewis was elected to the National Academy of Engineering in 1967 and was a member of their executive committee, chaired the National Research Council's Space Applications Summer Study, and chaired the Committee on Power Plant Siting.

Lewis retired as University President in 1982. His tenure was the longest in Lehigh's history.

=== Personal life ===
Lewis was awarded seven honorary degrees. Lewis was chairman of the council for the Harvard Foundation for Advanced Study and Research and a member of the Overseers' Visiting Committee for Engineering and Applied Physics, as well as being on the board of governors and a vice-president of the Harvard Engineering Society. Lewis also served as the chairman of United Way. He also served as a member of the board of directors of the Bethlehem Steel corporation, the PPL Corporation, Fairchild Industries, Fisher & Porter Company, Zenith Radio Corporation, and St. Luke's University Hospital.

Lewis had five daughters with his first wife, Marian Carter Chapman Lewis, who died in 1965. Lewis remarried to Emmaline Hoffman in 1966, gaining two step-children. Lewis died on April 19, 1989, at the age of 74 after a prolonged stay at a nursing home. When he died, the Bethlehem City Council issued a resolution stating that he “completely exemplifies what an educator is and does.”

== Legacy ==
In 1981, Lehigh's Asa Packer Society established a $250,000 scholarship fund in Lewis’s name. The school also created the Deming Lewis Faculty Award given to faculty deemed to have had the greatest impact on undergraduate lives by members of the 10-year reunion class. In 1984, Lewis was awarded Lehigh's Hillman Faculty Award, "for excellence in teaching or research work, or for advancing the interests of the University."

Lehigh's Physics building, Lewis Lab, was named after him. Lehigh's Tennis indoor facility, which was opened in 1993, is named in honor of Lewis.

Academic offices
Preceded by Harvey A. Neville	President of Lehigh University; 1964–1982	Succeeded by Peter Likins
