= Walter C. Bachman =

Walter C. Bachman (1911 – March 1, 1991) was an American ship designer and marine engineer, vice president and chief engineer at Gibbs and Cox, a member of the National Academy of Sciences, and a member of the American Society of Naval Engineers. Bachman was noted for his work on the design of ship propulsion systems.

Bachman was born in Pittsburgh, Pennsylvania. Bachman received a bachelor of science degree in industrial engineering and a master of science degree in mechanical engineering, both from Lehigh University, in 1933 and 1935, respectively.
