= Kukhareva London =

British fashion company

- Industry: fashion
- Founded: 2011
- Founder: Ekaterina Kukhareva
- Headquarters: London, United Kingdom
- Products: ready-to-wear clothing and accessories
- Website: kukhareva.com

Kukhareva London is a British womenswear private fashion company, which produces ready-to-wear clothing and accessories.

The brand was founded in 2011 by Ekaterina Kukhareva and is based in London.

== History ==
The brand founder Ekaterina Kukhareva was born in Ukraine and grew up moving between Denmark, Ukraine and later England, as a student at Kent College, Canterbury. Later she completed her BA in Textile Design at Central Saint Martin's College of Art and Design. Working for Temperley London after her graduation in 2009 she started to design womenswear with focus on patterns and prints.

The collections are presented biannually during the respective fashion weeks in New York, London and Paris.

== Charity ==
The brand supports charities such as Gracious Heart Foundation, British Red Cross Fashion Show 2015, Box Park Red Cross Pop Up Shop, Trinity Hospice Charity, Amber Lounge Fashion (under patronage of HSH Prince Albert II of Monaco).

In July 2020 the brand has launched the collection of tops designed in collaboration with Take Two London where a part of sale proceeds will go to a Tetiaroa Society charity. The brand is teamed up with the Brando Hotel and specifically participating in one of their programs that is working on saving and preserving the Coral Reefs and Natural Habitats in that part of the Pacific Ocean.
