= Robert S. Knox =

American physicist (1931–2026)

- Born: July 13, 1931; Newton, New Jersey, U.S.
- Died: October 17, 2026 (aged 95); Rochester, New York, U.S.
- Education: University of Rochester; University of Illinois Urbana-Champaign
- Occupation: Physicist
- Spouse: Myrta Borges (died 2023)

Robert S. Knox (July 13, 1931 – October 17, 2026) was an American physicist.

== Early life and career ==
Knox was born in Newton, New Jersey, on July 13, 1931. He attended Lehigh University, earning his BS degree in 1953. He also attended the University of Rochester, earning his PhD degree in optics and physics. After earning his degrees, he worked as a postdoctoral fellow at the University of Illinois Urbana-Champaign for two years.

He served as a professor in the department of physics and astronomy at the University of Rochester from 1960 to 1997. During his years as a professor, in 1962, he was named a fellow of the American Physical Society.

== Personal life and death ==
Knox was married to Myrta Borges. Their marriage lasted until her death in 2023.

Knox died at his home in Rochester, New York, on October 17, 2026, at the age of 95.
