= Richard Hayne =

American businessman

- Born: May 26, 1947 (age 79)
- Education: Lehigh University
- Spouse: Margaret Hayne

Richard Hayne (born May 26, 1947) is the president and CEO of Urban Outfitters, an American chain of clothing retailers. Hayne has served as chairman and president since 1976. In 2012, he became CEO following the retirement of Glen Senk. According to Forbes, Hayne dropped off the Forbes 400 list in 2015. As of March 2019, Hayne ranked #1818 on Forbes' Billionaires 2019 list.

== Early life and career ==
Hayne is a 1969 graduate of Lehigh University with a degree in anthropology.

He co-founded Urban Outfitters, Inc., in 1970 with his former wife, Judy Wicks. The couple divorced a year later. The first store was located near the campus of the University of Pennsylvania. Today, the company operates over 400 stores under four brands: Urban Outfitters, Free People, Anthropologie and Terrain, a gardening brand which has standalone stores in Westport, Connecticut, Devon, Pennsylvania and Glen Mills, Pennsylvania.

== Personal life ==
Hayne's current wife, Margaret Hayne, joined Urban Outfitters in August 1982. He and his wife have been criticized for donating about $13,000 to then-senator Rick Santorum until 2006, when Santorum lost his seat to Bob Casey, Jr. They also were criticized after Urban Outfitters hastily retracted a shirt advocating support for same-sex marriage in the wake of the passage of California's Prop 8 in 2008. The company later partnered with the National Center for Lesbian Rights to release a different shirt expressing support for same-sex marriage in 2009. He has avoided stating his own views on homosexuality. The company also partnered with gay YouTuber Connor Franta to sell a limited clothing line at their eight largest stores to raise money for GLSEN. The Haynes have five children, David, Jonathan, Sarah, Annesley ’12, and Judson. They reside in Coatesville, Pennsylvania, where they operate the Doe Run Dairy farm.
