= Peter Likins =

American academic administrator

Peter William Likins (born July 4, 1936) is a retired American professor and academic. He was president of Lehigh University from 1982 to 1997 and the University of Arizona from 1997 until his retirement in summer 2006.

== Biography ==
Likins graduated from Santa Cruz High School in 1953, where he was captain of the wrestling team and co-captain of the football team. He attended Stanford University as an undergraduate, studying civil engineering and became a member of Delta Tau Delta International Fraternity. He earned a master's from MIT and a PhD from Stanford.

He was a faculty member at UCLA from 1964 until 1976. Likins was the dean of Columbia's engineering school from 1976 to 1980 and provost of the university for professional schools from 1980 to 1981.

=== President of Lehigh University ===
He was president of Lehigh University from 1982 to 1997. Likins was elected a member of the National Academy of Engineering (1984) for contributions to spacecraft dynamics and control, and for leadership in engineering education through teaching, research, writing, and academic administration. While serving as President of Lehigh, first year student Jeanne Clery was raped and murdered. After the tragedy, Likins worked with Clery's parents and the United States Congress to pass the Clery Act.

At both Columbia and Lehigh, Likins was also professor of engineering.

=== President of the University of Arizona ===
He then served as president of the University of Arizona from 1997 until his retirement in summer 2006. During the last semester of his presidency, a wire from his pacemaker poked a hole in his heart, causing him to nearly faint during an emergency drill being conducted on campus at the time. He underwent open heart surgery soon thereafter. Under different conditions emergency medical personnel might not have been able to respond in time to save him.

== Sources ==
- 4.lehigh.edu

Academic offices
Preceded by W. Deming Lewis	President of Lehigh University; 1982–1997	Succeeded by William C. Hittinger
Preceded by Manuel Trinidad Pacheco	President of The University of Arizona; 1997–2006	Succeeded by Robert N. Shelton
