= Hold down (structural engineering) =

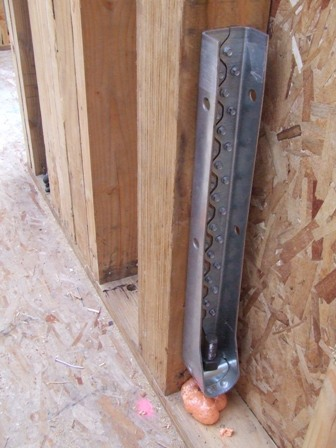
A hold down resisting uplift from a timber shear wall

A hold-down (also holdown or hold down) or tie-down in structural engineering refers to the steel device or hardware that is installed at the end of a plywood shear wall. The hold downs provide uplift resistance against the overturning moment imposed on the wall due to "in-plane" lateral load applied at the top of the wall. A hold-down may also refer to clamping device used to anchor a pipe to a structural steel element or concrete floor or allow movement of the pipe in an axial direction.

At the bottom, the hold down is connected to the concrete foundation or structural slab by an embedded or epoxied anchor bolt. At the top, the hold down is connected to a wood post with screws, nails or bolts.

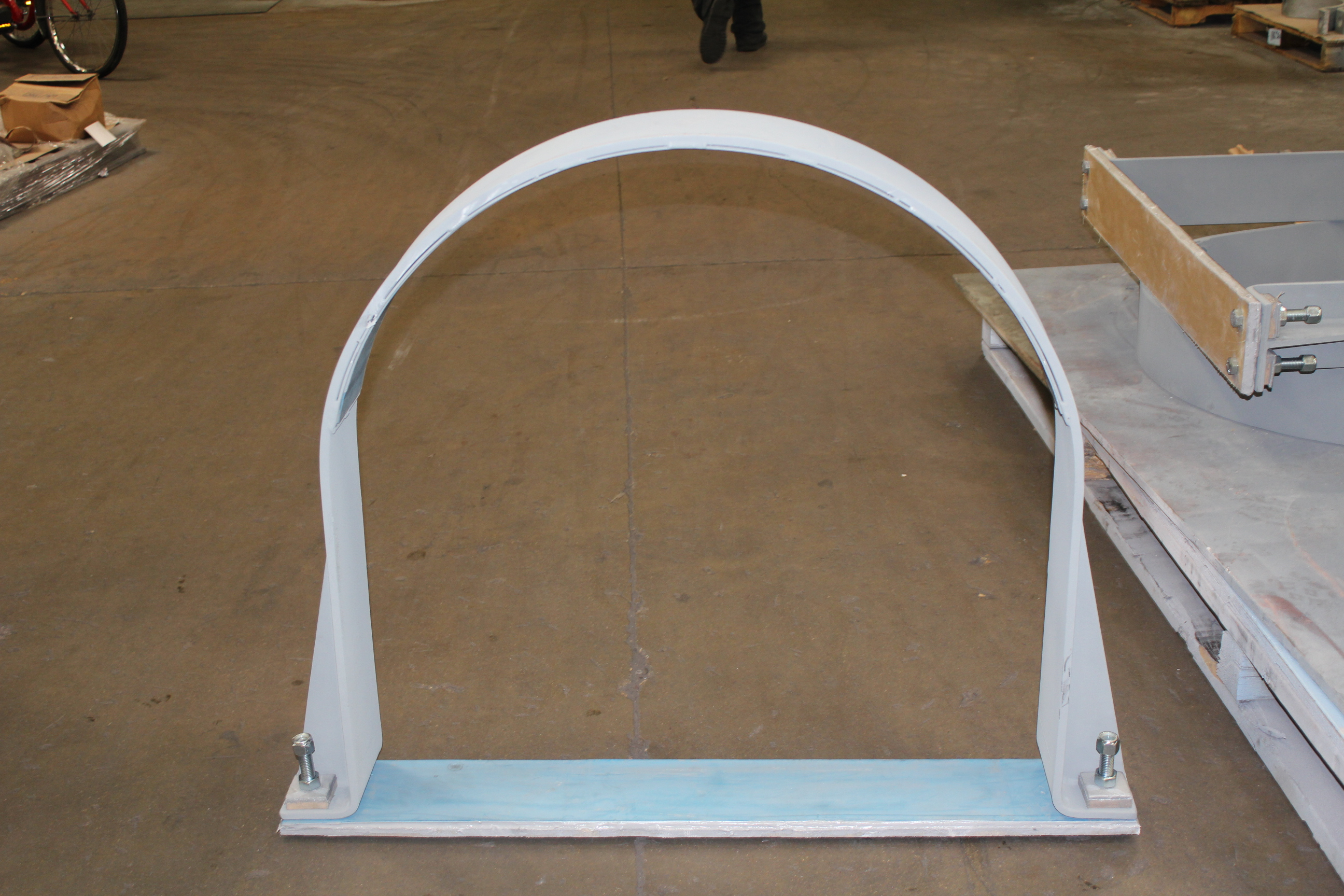
Hold-down clamp for anchoring pipes
