= BHLDN =

American women's clothing retailer

- Company type: Subsidiary
- Industry: Retail
- Founded: 2011
- Headquarters: Philadelphia, Pennsylvania, U.S.
- Parent: Urban Outfitters (2011–present)
- Website: www.bhldn.com

BHLDN (disemvowelment of "beholden") is an American women's clothing retailer that specializes in wedding dresses, bridesmaid dresses, bridal accessories, and wedding décor. Headquartered in Philadelphia, Pennsylvania, BHLDN is owned by Urban Outfitters, and is a sister brand to Anthropologie.

== History ==
BHLDN launched its website on Valentine’s Day 2011, and opened its first brick-and-mortar store in Houston in August 2011. The retailer has since expanded to operating additional brick-and-mortar stores in Chicago and New York, and shop-in-shop locations in Anthropologie stores in Atlanta, Bethesda, Boston, Beverly Hills, Carlsbad, Century City, Chestnut Hill, Denver, Newport Beach, New York City, Palo Alto, Portland, Philadelphia, Seattle, Walnut Creek, Washington D.C., and Westport. As of 2019, there were seventeen shops within Anthropologie stores and three standalone stores.

== Products ==
BHLDN has carried gowns and accessories from fashion designers including Catherine Deane, Tracy Reese, and Fleur Wood. BHLDN also has collaborated with Wedding Paper Divas, a subsidiary of photo publishing service Shutterfly, for a collection of wedding stationery.

In April 2016, BHLDN launched a party dress collection, offering dresses for special events.

In August 2016, BHLDN partnered with Indiana jewelry brand ILA to create a collection of nine engagement rings and wedding bands to be sold through the BHLDN website.
