= John Texter =

American engineer and chemist

- Born: August 9, 1949 (age 77); Lancaster, Pennsylvania, U.S.
- Education: Lehigh University
- Scientific career
- Fields: Chemistry
- Workplaces: Eastern Michigan University; National Science Foundation; Strider Research Corporation; Eastman Kodak Company
- Doctoral advisor: Kamil Klier

John Texter (born August 9, 1949, in Lancaster, Pennsylvania) is an American engineer, chemist, and educator. He is professor emeritus of polymer and coating technology at Eastern Michigan University (EMU) in Ypsilanti, Michigan, and managing consultant of Strider Research Corporation (SRC). He is known for his work in applied dispersion technology, small particle science, and stimuli-responsive polymers based on ionic liquids, his international conference organization activities, like Particles 2001, Particles 2002, and the Gordon Research Conferences, Chemistry at Interfaces and Chemistry of Supramolecules and Assemblies, and for his editing of the Primers page for nanoparticles.org.

== Education ==
Texter received his secondary education at Penn Manor High School in Millersville, Pennsylvania, where he lettered in soccer and wrestling. He matriculated to Lehigh University, Bethlehem, Pennsylvania, in 1967 with the aid of a Lehigh Merit Scholarship and graduated with a BSEE in 1971. He was mentored in his undergraduate years by John J. Karakash, who designed the Electrical Engineering curriculum at Lehigh to liberally educate through engineering. His proclivity for control theory (mentored by Donald Talheim), sparked an interest in physiology and then biochemistry, and he was further stimulated by the lectures of Forbes T. Brown in graduate mechanical engineering courses on time-dependent control theory and hybrid systems modeling with a focus on bond graph analysis. His undergraduate biochemistry studies led him to physical chemistry. He continued at Lehigh to obtain an MS in chemistry in 1973 (mentored by Daniel Zeroka, Jim Sturm, and Roland Lovejoy), an MS in mathematics in 1976 (mentored by Gilbert Stengel), and a PhD in chemistry in 1976. He was further mentored in graduate studies by Albert Zettlemoyer, Fred Fowkes, and Kamil Klier, his thesis advisor. Texter spent a postdoctoral year in biophysical spectroscopy at the University of California, Irvine with John Clark Sutherland in their physiology department, initiating Monte Carlo analyses and modeling of DNA photochemical processes, and a postdoctoral year with Eugene S. Stevens at Binghamton University, chemistry department, developing a time-dependent Hartree–Fock model for circular dichroism in saccharides and a Monte Carlo-based nonlinear optimization (solver) algorithm defined on compact sets with arbitrary constraints.

== Service to the public and the profession ==
Texter served as chairman of the division of colloid and surface chemistry of the American Chemical Society in 1998 and in a variety of line officer and executive committee positions before and since (1991–2002), and returned to serve as program chair (2008–2010). He has organized many regional, national, and international conferences, including organizing ACS NERM (American Chemical Society northeast regional meeting) symposia in Rochester, NY, chairing the Gordon Research Conferences: Chemistry at Interfaces (Interfacial Structure) in Meriden, New Hampshire, in 1996 and Chemistry of Supramolecules and Assemblies (Functional Materials through Bottom-Up Self-Assembly) in Barga, Tuscany, in 2007. He organized and served as General Chair for the Particles Conferences Particles 2001, Particles 2002, through Particles 2013 in Dayton. He is a member of the American Chemical Society, the American Institute of Chemical Engineers, the American Physical Society, the Materials Research Society, the Institute of Electrical and Electronics Engineers, and the Society for Imaging Science and Technology.

== Industrial career ==
Texter has 40+ years of experience in industrial small particle and coating technologies. He worked in the Eastman Kodak Research Laboratories from 1978 to 1998 and was managing consultant for Strider Research Corporation from 1998 to the present. From the spring of 2001, he served for a year as a rotator in the National Science Foundation Chemistry Division as Program Director of Experimental Physical Chemistry. Through Strider Research Corporation (SRC) he consults in nanotechnology, advanced polymeric composites and materials, intellectual property management. He offers SRC short courses and workshops in small particle technology, surface modification chemistry and processing, cross-linking technologies, and patenting.

While at Eastman Kodak Company and at Eastern Michigan University he was an inventor and co-inventor in the field of dispersion technology, and was awarded 47 issued US Patents and EU and PTO patents.

== Academic career ==
Texter joined the College of Engineering and Technology of Eastern Michigan University in the fall of 2002 as a professor of polymer and coating technology at the rank of full professor. In 2005 he was appointed tenure. Since joining EMU, he has also been a Coatings Research Institute faculty member. He spent a sabbatical year near Berlin as a Fellow of the Max Planck Society with Professor Markus Antionetti at the Max Planck Institute of Colloids and Interfaces.

His research has focused on small particle science and technology, the development of particle-based advanced materials, and polymeric advanced materials. His work has focused on applied problems in dispersion and materials technology for advanced coatings in imaging, antifouling, corrosion mitigation, and antimicrobial prophylaxis. He has made contributions to the understanding of microemulsion structure and the complex equilibria that exist among the exotic molecular complexes contained in microemulsions, as well as in microemulsion polymerization.

He has innovated in the fields of stimuli-responsive polymers (smart polymers) and polymerized ionic liquids.

In August 2021 he resigned his tenure and was named professor emeritus by the EMU Board of Regents on 9 December 2021

Highlights of Research Accomplishments:

2014–present Advanced understanding and experimental application of liquid-phase exfoliation of 2D materials (graphene, black phosphorus, MoS_{2}, ...) – Derived analytical kinetic model for 2D exfoliation in dispersion – Showed graphene dispersions to be rheo-optical fluids that reversible undergo isotropic to nematic transitions under shear

2006–present Third international lab (after Ohno in Japan and Mecerreyes in Spain) to help initiate polymerized ionic liquids (PIL) research with introduction of reversibly-porating gels based on pinned spinodal decomposition and nanolatex syntheses by microemulsion polymerization – Demonstrated such materials provide osmotic brush stabilization when used in dispersions as dispersing aids – Showed that such PIL materials, particularly nanolatexes, exhibit a dynamic range greater than 104-fold in stability based on anion exchange or solvent exchange – Illustrated that these stability phenomena are basis of stimuli responsive behaviors including polymer-poration, swelling, phase transfer in addition to dispersion stability – Showed how nanocarbons, such as SWCNT, MWCNT, and graphene, can be dispersed in water at concentrations of 1-17% by weight, eclipsing leading international labs by 100-fold – Applied ATRP controlled polymerization to make new class of triblock copolymers with PIL blocks that form thermoreversible gels – Developed diblock copolymers, poly(PNIPAM-b-PIL), that reversibly precipitate as ultrastable (in boiling water) nanoparticles when heated

2004–present Extended invention of solvent-free nanofluids, nanoparticles that form moderate to high viscosity liquids at room temperature in absence of any added solvent, by Giannelis, Archer, Wiesner groups at Cornell to create reactive solvent-free nanofluids to create new resins and materials and exotic cross-linking agents in photoinitiated UV (free radical), polyurethane, and polyurea (air curing) systems – Demonstrated applications in producing UV-protective overcoats, new adhesives and sealants, and lubricants – Showed that such liquid colloids can be used to mitigate brittleness and increase toughness induced by nanofillers in nanocomposites – Developed core-free solvent-free nanofluids derived from organo-trialkoxysilanes that, because of high polydispersity, provided first experimental examples of coexistence of multiple phase domains due to polydispersity – Showed that such glass transition and melting in such core-free nanofluids are lambda transitions and second-order (continuous) phase transitions – Presented reactive nanofluids as additive manufacturing inks (featured in C&E News)

1992-2013 Formulated first anionically stabilized microemulsion polymerization system without using cosurfactants, foundational to field of microemulsion polymerization – Advanced understanding of microemulsions and microemulsion polymerization by experimentally deriving an order parameter-based proof that swollen-micelle to bicontinuous to swollen-reverse-micelle transitions are continuous (second order) phase transitions – Demonstrated how to capture bicontinuous microemulsion structure by using neutron scattering to characterize microemulsion and resulting polymeric gel

1990-2008 Contributed to development of electroacoustic sonic amplitude (ESA) as practical method of characterizing electrokinetics in concentrated dispersions by developing calibration methods to translate measurements to electrophoretic mobilities – Showed that time-dependent dielectric reflectance spectroscopy (TDS) could derive electrophoretic mobilities of particulates in presence of indifferent electrolyte – Applied TDS to characterize microemulsion second-order phase transitions and percolation in microemulsions – Showed that dielectric spectroscopy could quantify electronic and ionic conductivities in coatings of colloids and gels

1977-1986 Demonstrated creation of zeolite supported colloidal copper and silver clusters by thermal and chemical reduction chemistries – Documented electronic Jahn-Teller splitting of UV silver ion multiplet spectra in zeolites – First experimental demonstration of electronic-spectral Dewar-Chatt effect (Dewar–Chatt–Duncanson model) in charged silver clusters using reversible ethylene and butylene adsorption-desorption

== Personal life ==
Texter and Melanie Martin married on June 20, 1984; they are estranged. They had a son, Kurt Martin Texter, and a daughter, Grace Martin Texter. Kurt works as a graphic designer and grocery worker in San Francisco, and Grace works as a graphic designer and artist in Manhattan. Texter was previously married to Rose Marie Joan Piotrowski on June 6, 1970; they divorced in 1980. Texter is studying Latin and swing social dancing and pursues weekly hiking with various groups.
