= Richard Hawley Tucker =

American astronomer

- Born: October 29, 1859; Wiscasset, Maine
- Died: March 31, 1952 (aged 92)
- Occupation: Astronomer

Richard Hawley Tucker (October 29, 1859 – March 31, 1952) was an American astronomer.

== Biography ==
He was born in Wiscasset, Maine, to a ship-owning and seafaring family. After a brief stint at sea starting at age 14, he attended Lehigh University, where he studied civil engineering but became interested in the study of astronomy. He graduated in 1879 and became an assistant at Dudley Observatory. He remained there for four years, and briefly worked with the United States Coast and Geodetic Survey.

In 1883 he joined Lehigh as an instructor of mathematics and astronomy. A year later he was offered a position with the Argentine National Observatory, where he would assist in a survey of the southern night sky. He remained there for nine years, then joined the staff of Lick Observatory in 1893. He remained at Lick until 1908, operating the Meridian Circle program to make precise measurements of star positions.

In 1908 he would travel to San Luis, Argentina as part of an expedition to measure the positions of stars in the southern part of the sky. These measurements were to be incorporated into a catalog for Dudley Observatory. During his time there he made 20,800 observations of stars. That same year, he was elected to the American Philosophical Society.

After his work in Argentina, he returned to Lick Observatory. In 1914 he married Ruth Standen, a secretary at Lick. He remained at the observatory until he retired in 1926, when he became Astronomer Emeritus. He spent his retirement years in Palo Alto, California.

During his career he published fifty three scientific articles. He was survived by his wife, two daughters and a grandson.

== Awards and honors ==
- Honorary Doctor of Science degree from Lehigh University, 1922.
- The crater Tucker on the Moon is named after him.
