= Amit H. Varma =

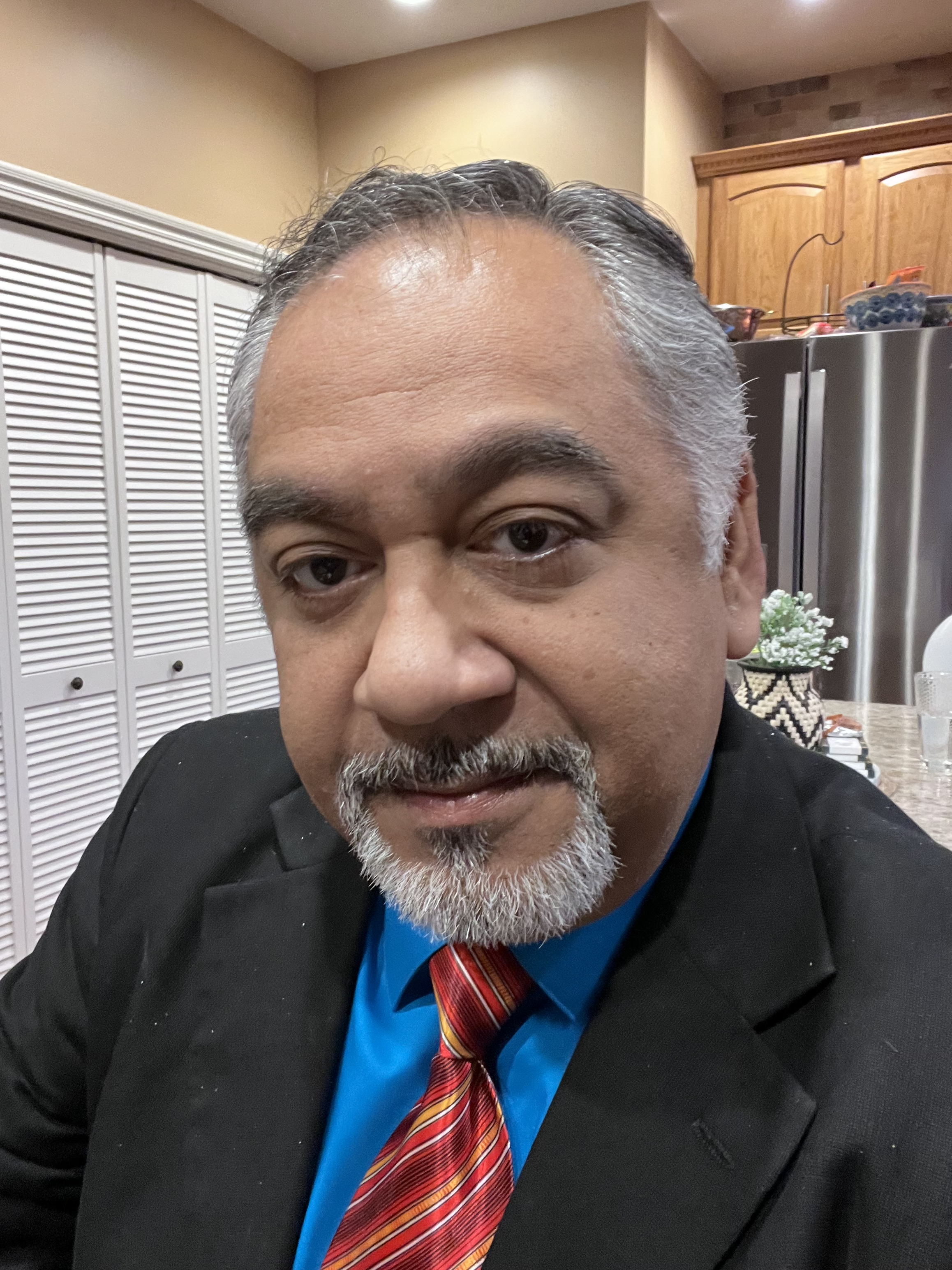
- Known for: Steel-concrete composite structures; structural fire engineering; SpeedCore composite core systems
- Awards: AISC Lifetime Achievement Award; AISC T. R. Higgins Lectureship Award; ASCE Shortridge Hardesty Award; ASCE Stephen D. Bechtel Jr. Energy Award

Academic background
- Education: Indian Institute of Technology Bombay, University of Oklahoma, Lehigh University

Academic work
- Discipline: Civil engineering
- Sub-discipline: Structural engineering
- Institutions: Purdue University

Amit H. Varma is an American civil engineer and academic. He is the Karl H. Kettelhut Professor of Civil Engineering at Purdue University and director of the Robert L. and Terry L. Bowen Laboratory for Large-Scale Civil Engineering Research. His research concerns steel and steel-concrete composite structures, including structural fire engineering, seismic behavior, and nuclear structural systems.

Varma has received professional honors from the American Institute of Steel Construction and the American Society of Civil Engineers, including the AISC Lifetime Achievement Award, the AISC T. R. Higgins Lectureship Award, the ASCE Shortridge Hardesty Award, and the ASCE Stephen D. Bechtel Jr. Energy Award.

== Education ==
Varma received a Bachelor of Technology degree from the Indian Institute of Technology Bombay, a Master of Science degree from the University of Oklahoma, and a Doctor of Philosophy degree from Lehigh University.

== Career ==
After receiving the doctorate, Varma joined Michigan State University as an assistant professor. He joined Purdue University in 2004 as an assistant professor and was promoted to associate professor in 2008 and professor in 2014.

Varma became associate director of Purdue's Bowen Laboratory in 2015 and director in 2017. In 2018, he was named Karl H. Kettelhut Professor.

== Research ==
Varma's research focuses on steel and steel-concrete composite structural systems and their behavior under fire, seismic, blast, and impact loading. The American Institute of Steel Construction states that his work is incorporated into AISC specifications including AISC 360, AISC 341, and AISC N690.

He has contributed to development of composite plate shear wall systems and SpeedCore construction methods. In 2023, AISC released Design Guide 38: SpeedCore Systems for Steel Structures. Additional coverage appears in Engineering News-Record. The American Society of Civil Engineers has described SpeedCore as a non-proprietary composite core system used to accelerate construction.

== Awards and honors ==
- Varma received AISC Special Achievement Awards in 2017 and 2020.
- In 2019, he received the ASCE Shortridge Hardesty Award. In 2021, he received the AISC T. R. Higgins Lectureship Award.
- Also in 2021, he received the ASCE Stephen D. Bechtel Jr. Energy Award.
- In 2025, he received the AISC Lifetime Achievement Award.
