= Psychoanalytic Psychology (journal) =

- Discipline: Psychology
- Language: English
- Edited by: Christopher Christian

Publication details
- History: 1984-present
- Publisher: American Psychological Association (USA)
- Frequency: Quarterly
- Impact factor: 1.481 (2020)

Standard abbreviations
- ISO 4: Psychoanal. Psychol.

Indexing
- ISSN: 0736-9735 (print); 1939-1331 (web)

Links
- Journal homepage; Online access

Psychoanalytic Psychology is a peer-reviewed academic journal published by Division 39 of the American Psychological Association. It was established in 1984 and covers research in psychoanalysis. The current editor-in-chief is Christopher Christian of the City University of New York.

== Abstracting and indexing ==
According to the Journal Citation Reports, the journal has a 2020 impact factor of 1.481.
