= Drinker (surname) =

Drinker is a surname. Notable people with the surname include:

- Anne Drinker (1827–1903), pen name Edith May, American poet
- Catherine Drinker Bowen (1897–1973), née Drinker, American biographer
- Catherine Ann Janvier (1841–1922), née Drinker, American artist and author
- Cecil Kent Drinker (1887–1956), American physician and founder of the Harvard School of Public Health
- Elizabeth Sandwith Drinker (ca. 1735–1807), American Quaker diarist
- Ernesta Drinker Ballard (1920–2005), née Drinker, American feminist and horticulturist
- Henry Drinker (1880–1965), American lawyer and musicologist
- Henry Sturgis Drinker (1850–1937), American mechanical engineer, lawyer and author, president of Lehigh University
- Katherine Rotan Drinker (1889–1956), American physician
- Philip Drinker (1894–1972), American industrial hygienist who invented the first iron lung
- Sophie Drinker (1888–1967), American amateur musician and musicologist
