= Drinker =

Drinker or The Drinker may refer to:

== Art and literature ==
- The Drinker (Banksy), a 2004 statue
- The Drinker (novel), a 1950 novel by Hans Fallada
- The Drinkers, or The Triumph of Bacchus, a 1628 painting by Diego Velázquez

== Biology ==
- Drinker nisti, a genus of hypsilophodont dinosaur from the late Jurassic period of North America
- Drinker (moth) (Euthrix potatoria), a moth species in family Lasiocampidae

== Other uses ==
- Drinker (surname), a surname
- Drinker House, a building used for student housing at Haverford College, named after Henry Drinker
- "Drinker", a song by Kyary Pamyu Pamyu from Pamyu Pamyu Revolution
- "Drinker", the YouTube persona of Will Jordan
