= Jewish Women's Archive =

Non-profit organization in the USA

- Type: Non-profit organization
- Founded: 1995
- Headquarters: Brookline, MA
- Key people: Judith Rosenbaum, Executive Director
- Revenue: 1,419,313 United States dollar (2017)
- Total assets: 5,242,906 United States dollar (2022)
- Website: jwa.org

The Jewish Women's Archive (JWA) is a national non-profit organization whose mission is to document "Jewish women's stories, elevate their voices, and inspire them to be agents of change."

JWA was founded by Gail Twersky Reimer in 1995 in Brookline, Massachusetts with the goal of using the Internet to increase awareness of and provide access to the stories of American Jewish women. JWA makes a growing collection of information, exhibits, and resources available via its website. Its activities include the conception, production and dissemination of:

- Community-based oral history projects
- Online exhibitions
- Original academic research
- Educational materials including curricula, a poster series and an oral history guide
- Training Institutes for educators working in formal and informal settings
- Documentary film

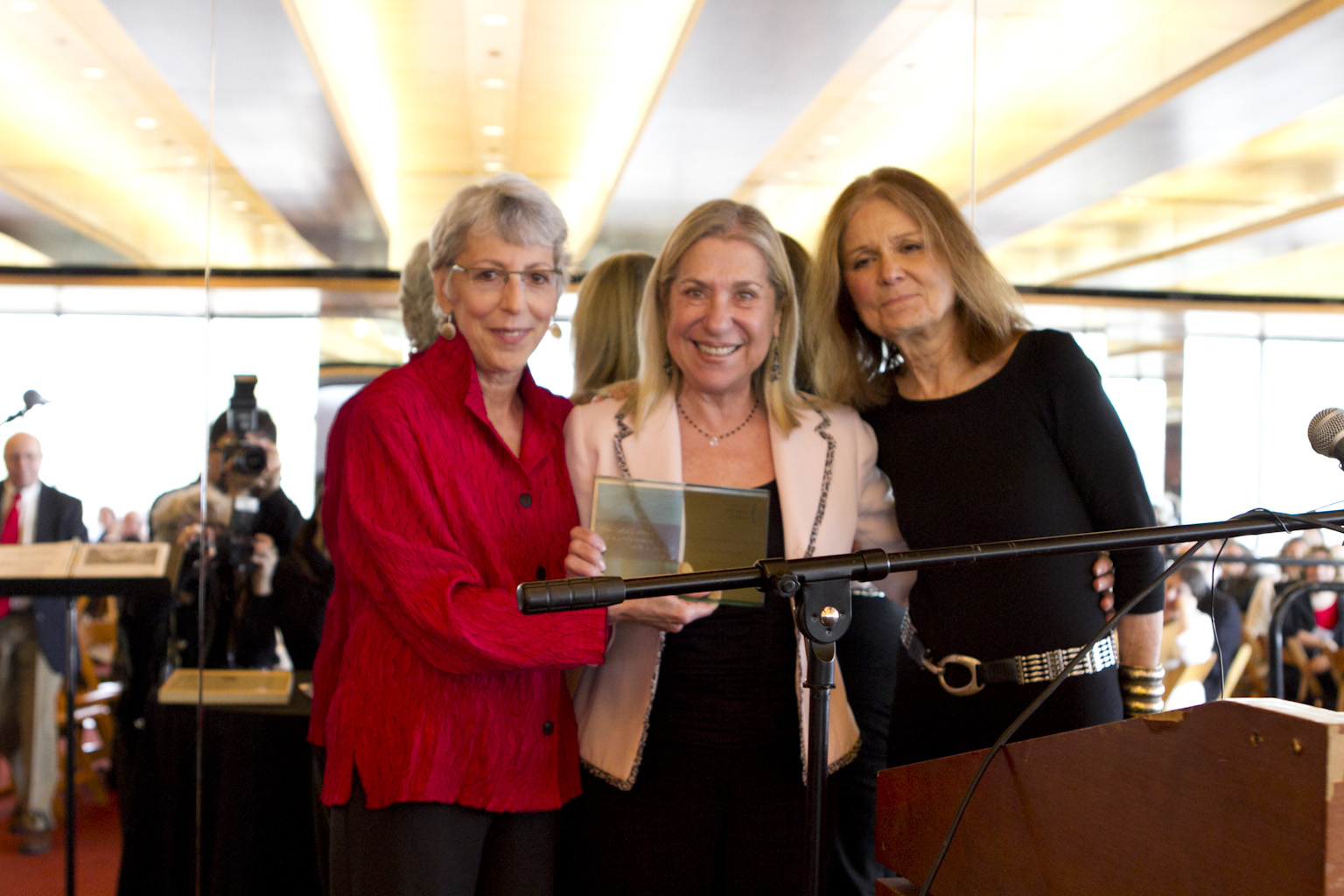
Letty Cottin Pogrebin receives award at Annual Luncheon of Jewish Women's Archive. L2R: JWA Founding Director Gail Reimer; Pogrebin; Ms. Magazine co-founder and Award presenter Gloria Steinem. Photo: Joan Roth

Starting in 2010, JWA also began holding an Annual Luncheon in New York City at which it honors three women for their activism and achievements. In 2010 the focus was on the Triangle Fire (2010 was the centenary of that tragedy). Honorees included Ruth J. Abram (co-founder of the Tenement Museum), Kate Frucher (attorney and entrepreneur), and journalist Lynn Sherr. In 2011 the luncheon was titled "Making Trouble / Making History." Gloria Steinem presented the awards, which were given to Elizabeth A. Sackler (The Elizabeth A. Sackler Center for Feminist Art, Brooklyn Museum), Rebecca Traister (author, Big Girls Don't Cry, journalist), and Letty Cottin Pogrebin (author, "Deborah, Golda, and Me," etc., journalist, founding editor, "Ms magazine").

== Major programs and projects ==
=== Curricula and educational resources ===
JWA's most recent curriculum, Living the Legacy, focuses on the role of Jewish women in the Civil Rights Movement and labor movement, seeking to highlight their often-neglected but central role. Additional educational resources include 18 "Go & Learn" lesson plans, book and film guides, primary source materials and mother-daughter workshop materials. Previous curricula include Making Our Wilderness Bloom.

=== Online encyclopedia ===
The Shalvi/Hyman Encyclopedia of Jewish Women edited by Jennifer Sartori, formerly Jewish Women: A Comprehensive Historical Encyclopedia edited by Paula Hyman and Dalia Ofer, is accessible for free via JWA's website. The encyclopedia features approximately 2,000 articles on the lives and achievements of Jewish women. Articles are also disseminated via Twitter.

=== Film ===
In 2007 JWA produced Making Trouble, a documentary film about three generations of female Jewish comedians and the complexity and challenges of their relationship to comedy, Judaism and gender. The film profiles Molly Picon, Fanny Brice, Sophie Tucker, Joan Rivers, Gilda Radner, and Wendy Wasserstein as well as contemporary comedians Judy Gold and Jackie Hoffman. The film has been screened at over 70 film festivals and other venues.

=== Podcast ===
The Jewish Women's Archive produced a podcast called Can We Talk? hosted by Nahanni Rous. Rous is also joined by Judith Rosenbaum and Ibby Caputo. The show released its first episode on January 26, 2016, and continued to release episodes on a monthly basis. Each episode is only about twenty minutes in length. The show interviews Jewish women about news, politics, and culture. In one episode the hosts interview Anita Diamant about her book The Red Tent. The show was featured in Steve Olsher's "Ultimate Directory of Podcasters" as one of the top ten podcasts about Judaism as well as one of the top ten religion and spirituality podcasts.

=== Online exhibits ===
Katrina's Jewish Voices is an online exhibit of photos, blog posts, podcasts, and email messages documenting the experience of the Jewish community during and after Hurricane Katrina, produced in collaboration with the Center for History and New Media at George Mason University In partnership with the Institute for Southern Jewish History, JWA conducted 85 interviews with members of the New Orleans, Baton Rouge, and Gulf Coast Jewish communities which are included in the exhibit. Other online exhibits include Jewish Women and the Feminist Revolution, History Makers: Women of Valor and Women Who Dared: Contemporary Activists.

=== Other resources ===
We Remember is an online collection of personal reflections and reminiscences about recently deceased notable American Jewish women. This Week in History is a calendar of events that matches the current date with events in Jewish women's history.

== Leadership ==
Notable staff and directors (as of 2023) include the CEO of JWA, Dr. Judith Rosenbaum. Their founding director is Dr. Gail Twersky Reimer. The current Chief Development Officer is Debra Cash, and their Chief Communications Officer and Encyclopedia Editor is Dr. Jennifer Sartori, co-director of the Adoption & Jewish Identity Project.

Barbara Dobkin is the Founding Chair of JWA's Board, which is currently led by Rabbi Carole Balin.

=== Founding leadership ===
The founding board of directors included the following:

- Joyce Antler
- Peggy Charren (deceased)
- Barbara B. Dobkin, Founding Chair of JWA's Board
- Ruth B. Fein
- Susan Galler
- Penina Migdal Glazer
- Sally A. Gottesman
- Barbara W. Grossman
- Susan Harris
- Lee M. Hendler
- Beth Klarman
- Martha L. Minow
- Suzanne G. Priebatsch
- Brenda Brown Rever
- Prudence L. Steiner
- Nancy Schwartz Sternoff (deceased)
- Nicki Newman Tanner
- Jeane Ungerleider
- Henny Wenkart (deceased)
- Doris Zelinsky

=== Advisory Councils ===
The JWA has three advisory councils:

- Academic Advisory Council, led by Joyce Antler
- Technology Advisory Council
- Education Working Group
