= Kathi Meyer-Baer =

- Born: Katharina Gertrud Meyer; July 27, 1892; Berlin
- Died: January 3, 1977 (aged 84); Atlanta
- Occupations: musicologist, librarian
- Years active: 1922–1970

Kathi Meyer-Baer was a musicologist, librarian and bibliographer, "arguably the most significant, and surely the most productive, female musicologist of her generation."

== Early years ==
Katharina Gertrud Meyer was born to a prosperous Jewish family in Berlin on July 27, 1892. Her father Martin was a banker and her mother was Gertrud (born Salinger). She attended a private girls' school and studied music at the Stern Conservatory, studying piano with Frieda Kwast-Hodapp and music theory with Wilhelm Klatte. Upon graduating high school in 1911, she began studies at Berlin University where her professors included Hermann Kretzschmar and Johannes Wolf. When it was time to submit her dissertation to Kretzschmar, he rejected it saying he could not accept a dissertation from a woman during wartime. Josephson also believes that anti-Jewish sentiment led Kretzschmar to reject her dissertation. Upon the advice of Wolf, she transferred to Leipzig University and submitted her dissertation to Hugo Riemann. After qualifying exams she was granted a doctorate in 1916. Her dissertation was published the following year with the title Der chorische Gesang der Frauen, mit besonderer Bezugnahme seiner Betätigung auf geistlichem Gebiet. 1. Teil bis zur Zeit um 1800. It was published in 1917. She was only the second woman to receive a Ph.D. in musicology.

Wartime conditions in Berlin proved inhospitable, so Kathi moved to Munich in 1917, initially living with her sister Dora Edinger. She began lecturing at local women's clubs and began publishing articles. Turbulent political conditions made her move back to Berlin. There she published a few music reviews for the Neues Frauen Zeitung from 1919 to 1921.

== Career in Europe ==
In 1921 Dora and her family moved to Frankfurt and Kathi went to help them get settled. After a concert featuring her former singing teacher Ludwig Landshoff, Kathi met choral director Margarete Dessoff and her brother Albert Dessoff, who was in charge of the Frankfurt-based Rothschild Library. This led to a meeting with Paul Hirsch, an industrialist who had the largest private library in Europe. Upon hearing that she was rejected for a teaching position at Goethe University Frankfurt, Hirsch offered her a position as librarian of his private library. She accepted the position and functioned as librarian from 1922 until 1936. Although not a trained librarian, her extensive research in the Prussian State Library informed her ideas about organization and maintenance of the Hirsch Library. She recognized that the library was "not merely an accumulation of treasures, but a living institute." Her responsibilities included acquisitions and organization of the library as well as helping users with research. Among such users were eminent musicians such as Wilhelm Furtwängler, Zoltán Kodály, Richard Strauss, Igor Stravinsky and Bruno Walter among others. Additionally she helped Hirsch with hosting meetings of bibliophilic and music societies as well as helping with the programming of concerts and recitals.

Her assumption as the Hirsch librarian increased her reputation so that she became reviewer for the Frankfurter Zeitung. From 1922 through 1927 she contributed over 300 articles to the newspaper. Thereafter, because of cost-cutting streamlining, she contributed far fewer articles. At times she also contributed to the Neue Musik-Zeitung and the Gemeindeblatt der Israelitischen Gemeinde Frankfurt. She published her first book in 1925, Das Konzert, ein Führer durch die Geschichte des Musizierens in Bildern und Melodien (The Concert, a guide to the history of Music-making in pictures and Melodies). Eventually recognizing that an appointment to an academic position as a musicologist was not available to her, she enrolled in the Prussian State Library's librarian program, and after passing a state exam was granted certification as research librarian in 1928.

She curated the scholarly portion a large exhibition Musik im Leben der Völker (Music in the Life of Peoples) held from June 11 through August 28, 1927. Meyer-Baer wrote the forward to the exhibition catalog. The exhibit received extensive coverage in the German press.

The year 1928 also saw the publication the first volume inventorying the Hirsch Library. The second volume appeared in 1930.

Receiving a grant from the Notgemeinschaft der deutschen Wissenschaft (Emergency Assistance Society of German Scholarship) allowed her to work on her next book Bedeutung und Wesen der Musik, which was published in 1932. Although intended as a two-volume history of music aesthetics, only one volume was published.

In 1932, she mounted the exhibit Musik um Goethe (Music About Goethe) on the centenary of the poet's death at the Manskopfschen Musikhistorischen Museum (Manskopf Museum of Music History). She curated a third exhibit devoted to the work or Richard Wagner, Oper und Drama opening in 1933 two weeks after the Nazis were elected to the government.

In 1934 Sophie Drinker read Meyer-Baer's dissertation. Drinker wrote to Mayer-Baer suggesting she expand her dissertration into a history of women making music. From there a relationship developed, initially entirely by correspondence, with Drinker requesting material for a book and Meyer-Baer dutifully providing copies.

The Baers arrived in Paris on March 30, 1938, intending to settle, but the collapse of the government made them look elsewhere. They arrived in New York on March 24, 1940, and soon after met up with Harry and Sophie Drinker.

== In the United States ==
Through the connection established with Sophie Drinker, she and her husband Henry Drinker functioned as sponsors for the Baers' immigration, although they would not guarantee financial security. Nevertheless, the Baers initially settled in Philadelphia to maintain connection with their Drinkers and to establish a base from which they could seek employment.

Eventually the Baers settled in New Rochelle. Carl Engel was able to offer Kathi a temporary editorial position at G. Schirmer, Inc.. With the end of that job in sight, in 1941 she applied to the Emergency Committee in Aid of Displaced Foreign Scholars in the hope of finding an appropriate job. The Committee contacted administrators at the New York Public Library who had been keeping a position open in the hope of hiring Otto Erich Deutsch. By April 1941 they decided to offer a job to Mayer-Baer while leaving open the possibility of hiring Deutsch in the future should he be able to come (ultimately he chose to remain in England). With funds supplied by the Emergency Committee Meyer-Baer began a one-year appointment at the Library in the Music Division on November 1, 1941. Towards the end of her year, Carleton Sprague Smith, the head of the Music Division, met with the Emergency Committee and advised not to renew Meyer-Baer's grant, saying that among numerous inaccuracies in her work, she was "unsuitable" as a librarian or a teacher.

Having arrived in the United States under the sponsorship of the Drinkers, Meyer-Baer's contact and relationship with Sophie increased. They discussed various issues related to the preparation of Drinker's book. Although Meyer-Baer's work temporarily ceased while she was employed by the New York Public Library, their collaboration resumed once that job ended. After November 1942 there was no communication until Spring 1944 when Drinker communicated to Meyer-Baer that she had finished her book having decided to take her research in a different direction. Meyer-Baer was incensed, believing that the two were collaborating. David Josephson, Meyer-Baer's biographer, devoted many pages detailing how their relationship fell apart and the emotional harm it had on Meyer-Baer.

After the Drinker fiasco, Meyer-Baer's next major accomplishment was publication of the fourth volume of Paul Hirsch's library, Katalog der Musikbibliothek Paul Hirsch, Frankfurt am Main. In 1947 she was awarded two fellowships, $1,500 from the International Federation of University Women for examining incunabula at the Bodleian Library at Oxford and the British Museum, and $500 from the American Council of Learned Societies for travel related to her inventory of music incunabula. Of all the people Meyer-Baer knew professionally, the one who had the greatest impact was Paul Hirsch. Not only had Hirsch hired her as his librarian, but he had given her professional encouragement as well as being a very supportive friend and colleague. Hirsch's death in 1951 left a large lacuna in Meyer-Baer's life. "Henceforth, she would carry on life as an independent scholar very much alone, supported here and there by sympathetic minds inside and outside her field. But she would never fill the voice left by Hirsch's death. Her loss was beyond calculation."

In 1955 Meyer-Baer resumed work on a manuscript and received a grant of $900 from the American Philosophical Society to assemble images from Princeton and Harvard for what would be her final book, Music of the Spheres and the Dance of Death. Although published in 1970, she was busy with numerous projects resulting in articles and an exhibition cataloged on musical incunabula.

In July 1976, while visiting her son in Atlanta, Meyer-Baer fell and broke her knee. Eventually her son George brought her to a nursing home in Atlanta (where he lived). There she fell into dementia and died on January 3, 1977. Her husband Curtis had died on November 9, 1976, having fallen at home.

== Personal ==
She had met Kurt Otto Carl Baer (he later Americanized his forename to Curtis 1898–1976) at a dinner party in 1930. Baer worked at a multi-national business exporting leather goods. They were married in a civil ceremony on April 7, 1934, with a religious ceremony following eight days later. Their only child, George Martin Baer, was born January 12, 1936. In order to achieve British citizenship, they had arranged for the child to be born in London. George became a veterinary virologist, working for many years at the Centers for Disease Control and Prevention before retiring to Mexico.

== Selected Publications ==
=== Books ===
- Meyer-Baer, Kathi (1917). Die chorische Gesang der Frauen mit besonderer Bezugnahme seiner Betätigung auf geistlichem Gebiet (in German). Vol. I. Teil: Bis zur Zeit um 1800. Leipzig: Breitkopf & Härtel.
- Bottrigari, Ercole (1924) [1594]. Meyer, Kathi (ed.). Il Desiderio overo de’ concerti di varii strumenti musicali, Venetia 1594. Veröffentlichungen der Musik-bibliothek Paul Hirsch (in Italian). Vol. Serie I, Nr. 5. Introduction and notes by Kathi Meyer. Facsimile of the second edition, Bologna, 1599. Series edited by Johannes Wolf with Paul Hirsch. Also: American Institute of Musicology, 5. Berlin: Martin Breslauer.
- Meyer-Baer, Kathi (1925). Das Konzert, ein Führer durch die Geschichte des Musizierens in Bildern und Melodien. Musikalische Volksbücher (in German). Stuttgart: J. Engelhorns Nachf.
- Meyer-Baer, Kathi (1927). Katalog der internationalen Ausstellung Musik im Leben der Völker, Frankfurt am Main 11. Juni-28. August 1927 (in German). Frankfurt: Werner & Winter.
- Meyer-Baer, Kathi; Stege, Fritz (1975) [1932]. Bedeutung und Wesen der Musik, Der Bedeutungswandel der Musik (in German). Originally published Strasbourg: Heitz, 1932 (2nd ed.). Baden-Baden: Valentin Koerner.
- Meyer, Kathi; Hirsch, Paul, eds. (1928). Katalog der Musikbibliothek Paul Hirsch, Frankfurt am Main (in German). Vol. I: Theoretische Drucke bis 1800. Berlin: Martin Breslauer.
- Meyer, Kathi; Hirsch, Paul, eds. (1930). Katalog der Musikbibliothek Paul Hirsch, Frankfurt am Main (in German). Vol. II: Opern-Partituren. Berlin: Martin Breslauer.
- Meyer, Kathi; Hirsch, Paul, eds. (1936). Katalog der Musikbibliothek Paul Hirsch, Frankfurt am Main (in German). Vol. III: Instrumental- und Vokalmusik bis etwa 1830. Frankfurt am Main: Paul Hirsch.
- Meyer, Kathi; Hirsch, Paul, eds. (1947). Katalog der Musikbibliothek Paul Hirsch, Frankfurt am Main. Publications of the Paul Hirsch Music Library, Second Series, Catalogue of the Library (in German). Vol. IV: Erstausgaben, Chorwerke in Partitur, Gesamtausgaben, Nachschlagewerke, etc., Ergänzungen zu Bd. I-III. Cambridge: University Press.
- Meyer-Baer, Kathi (1962). Liturgical Music Incunabula: A Descriptive Catalogue. London: The Bibliographical Society.
- Meyer-Baer, Kathi (1970). Music of the Spheres and the Dance of Death: Studies in Musical Iconology. Reprint, New York: Da Capo Press, 1984. ISBN 978-0306762314. Princeton, New Jersey: Princeton University Press. ISBN 978-0691091105.

=== Articles ===
- Meyer, Kathi (1917). "Ein Beitrag zu dem Bilde Francesco Guardis in der Älteren Pinakothek". Kunstchronik Kunstmarkt (in German). 43: 516–519.
- Meyer, Kathi (1918–1919). "Das "Amptbuch" des Johannes Meyer, ein Beitrag zur Geschichte des Musikbetriebes in den Klöstern des Mittelalters". Archiv für Musikwissenschaft (in German). 1: 166–178.
- Meyer, Kathi (1918–1919). "Ein historisches Lied aus dem Frauenkloster zu St. Gallen". Zeitschrift für Musikwissenschaft (in German). 1: 269–277.
- Meyer, Kathi (1920). "Kants Stellung zur Musikästhetik". Zeitschrift für Musikwissenschaft (in German). 3: 470–482.
- Meyer, Kathi (1921). "Das Offizium und seine Beziehung zum Oratorium". Archiv für Musikwissenschaft (in German). 3: 371–404.
- Meyer, Kathi (1922). "Der Einfluss der gesanglichen Vorschriften auf die Chor- und Emporenanlagen in den Klosterkirchen". Archiv für Musikwissenschaft (in German). 4: 155–168.
- Meyer, Kathi (1925) [1660]. "Die Musik der 'Geharnschten Venus'". Die geharnschte Venus; oder, Liebes-Lieder im Kriege gedichtet mit neuen Gesang-Weisen zu singen und zu spielen gesetzet nehenst ettlichen Sinnreden der Liebe (in German). by Kaspar von Stieler. München: C. Wolf & Sohn. pp. 183–198.
- Meyer, Kathi (1926–1927). "Ein Musiker des Göttinger Hainbundes, Joseph Martin Kraus". Zeitschrift für Musikwissenschaft (in German). 9: 468–486.
- Meyer, Kathi (1927). "Die Musikbibliothek Paul Hirsch in Frankfurt a. M.". Taschenbuch für Büchersammler (in German). 2: 10–14.
- Meyer, Kathi (1927). "Griechische Musik, ihre Rolle im Griechischen Geistesleben und ihre Bedeutung für die abendländische Kunst". Sinica, Mitteilungen des China-Instituts zu Frankfurt a. M. (in German) (11/12): 207–217.
- Meyer-Baer, Kathi (1929). "Über Musikbibliographie". In Lott, Walter; Osthoff, Helmuth; Wolffheim, Werner (eds.). Musikwissenschaftliche Beiträge: Festschrift für Johannes Wolf zu seinem sechzigsten Geburtstage (in German). Reprint, Hildesheim: Georg Olms, 1978. Berlin: Martin Breslauer.
- Meyer-Baer, Kathi (1935). "Die Musikdrucke in den liturgischen Inkunabel von Wenssler und Kilchen". Gutenberg Jahrbuch (in German). 10: 117–126.
- Meyer-Baer, Kathi (1935). "Un Ballet à Cassel au XVIIe Siècle". La Revue Musicale (in French). 16: 195–198.
- Meyer-Baer, Kathi; O’Meara, Eva Judd (1935). "The Printing of Music 1473–1934". The Dolphin: A Journal of the Making of Books (2). New York: Limited Editions Club: 171–207.
- Meyer-Baer, Kathi (1935). "Was sind musikalische Erstausgaben". Philobiblon (in German). 8: 181–184.
- Meyer-Baer, Kathi (1939). "The Liturgical Music Incunabula in the British Museum — Germany, Italy, and Switzerland". The Library: Transactions of the Bibliographical Society. 4th series. 20: 272–294.
- Meyer-Baer, Kathi (1940). "Die Illustrationen in den Musikbüchern des 16-17 Jahrhunderts". Philobiblon (in German). 12: 205–212, 278–292.
- Meyer-Baer, Kathi (1940). "New Facts on the Printing of Music Incunabula". In Gustave Reese (ed.). Papers of the American Musicological Society, Annual Meeting, 1940, Cleveland, Ohio. pp. 80–87.
- Meyer-Baer, Kathi; Christensen, Inger (December 1942). "Artaria Plate Numbers". Notes for the Music Library Association. first series (15): 1–22.
- Meyer-Baer, Kathi (1944). "Early Breitkopf und Härtel Thematic Catalogues of Manuscript Music". The Musical Quarterly. 30: 163–173.
- Meyer-Baer, Kathi (1946). "Michel de Toulouse: The First Printer of Measured Music?". Music Review. 7: 178–182.
- Meyer-Baer, Kathi (1946–1947). "Nicholas of Cusa on the Meaning of Music". The Journal of Aesthetics and Art Criticism. 5: 301–308.
- Meyer-Baer, Kathi (January 1949). "The Music Collection of Duke University Library". Library Notes, A Bulletin Issued for The Friends of Duke University Library: 1–5.
- Meyer-Baer, Kathi (1949–1950). "Musical Iconology in Raphael's Parnassus". The Journal of Aesthetics and Art Criticism. 8: 87–96.
- Meyer-Baer, Kathi (1951–1952). "Art Illustrations in Text-Books". College Art Journal. 11: 188–191.
- Meyer-Baer, Kathi (1951). "Classifications in American Music Libraries". Music Review. 12. Reprinted in Reader in Music Librarianship, edited by Carol Bradley (Washington, D.C.: Microcard Editions, 1973).: 76–82.
- Meyer-Baer, Kathi (1952). "The Eight Gregorian Modes on the Cluny Capitals". Art Bulletin. 34: 75–94.
- Meyer-Baer, Kathi (1952–1953). "Psychologic and Ontologic Ideas in Augustine's De Musica". Journal of Aesthetics and Art Criticism. 11: 224–230.
- Meyer-Baer, Kathi (1954). "St. Job as a Patron of Music". Art Bulletin. 36: 21–31.
- Meyer-Baer, Kathi (1955). "Saints of Music". Musica Disciplina. 9: 11–33.
- Meyer-Baer, Kathi (1955). "Some Remarks on the Problems of the Basse-dance". Tijdschrift der Vereeniging voor Noord-Nederlands Muziekgeschiedenis. 17: 251–277.
- Meyer-Baer, Kathi (1960). "Der Musikdruck in Inkunabeln, ein übersehenes Hilfsmittel zur Beschreibung". Libri, International Library Review and IFLA-Communications-FIAB (in German). 10: 105–110.
- Meyer-Baer, Kathi (1961). "Origin of Musical Instruments and Instrumental Music in the Early Middle Ages". The American Philosophical Society, Year Book 1960. Philadelphia: The American Philosophical Society.
- Meyer-Baer, Kathi (1966). "Music in Dante's "Divina Commedia"". In Jan LaRue (ed.). Aspects of Medieval and Renaissance Music: a Birthday Offering to Gustave Reese. New York: W. W. Norton.
- Meyer-Baer, Kathi (1971). "From the Office of the Hours to the Musical Oratorio". Music Review. 32: 156–171.
- Meyer-Baer, Kathi (1973). "Are There Musical First Editions?". In Carol Bradley (ed.). Reader in Music Librarianship. Translation by Meyer-Baer of "Was sind musikalische Erstausgaben" (1935), with an Author's note, 1968. Washington: Microcard Editions.
- Meyer-Baer, Kathi (1948). "Review of The Schubert Reader: A Life of Franz Schubert in Letters and Documents". Journal of the American Musicological Society. 1 (1): 39–40. doi:10.2307/829774. JSTOR 829774.
- Meyer-Baer, Kathi (1971). "Communication". Journal of the American Musicological Society (Letter to the editor). 24 (1). In reference to Sven Hansell, "Sacred Music at the Incurabili in Venice at the Time of J. A. Hasse—I," Journal of the American Musicological Society 23 (1970): 282–301.: 139–140. doi:10.2307/830863. JSTOR 830863.

=== Unpublished works ===
- Meyer-Baer, Kathi. Athenaeus, ausgewählte Kapitel über Musik aus den Deipnosophisten, übersetzt und mit Einleitung und Register versehen (Unpublished manuscript) (in German). Durham, NC: Rare Book, Manuscript, and Special Collections Library, Duke University.
- Meyer-Baer, Kathi. Easter Ceremony in a French Convent in 1287 (Unpublished manuscript). Durham, NC: Rare Book, Manuscript, and Special Collections Library, Duke University.
- Meyer-Baer, Kathi. Danceries (Unpublished manuscript). Baer Family Collection.
- Meyer-Baer, Kathi (1925). Der Hirsch in der Kunst / Festschrift zum 24. Februar 1925 (Unpublished manuscript) (in German). Baer Family Collection.
- Meyer-Baer, Kathi. Die Musikbibliothek Paul Hirsch, Ein musikalisches und bibliophiles Zentrum, Erinnerungen von Dr. Kathi Meyer-Baer (Unpublished manuscript) (in German). Baer Family Collection.
- Meyer-Baer, Kathi. Saint Hildegard’s Ideas on Music As Represented in the Illuminations of her Works (Unpublished manuscript). Baer Family Collection.
- Meyer-Baer, Kathi (1995) [c. 1933]. Kersting, Ann Barbara (ed.). Verzeichnis von Texten zu Kantaten Georg Philipp Telemanns (Unpublished manuscript). Edited as: G. P. Telemann: Kirchenkantaten (Frankfurter Jahrgänge). Frankfurt am Main: Stadt- und Universitätsbibliothek Frankfurt am Main. HB 20:G 920.
