= Joyce Antler =

Academic; women's historian; founder of multiple important organizations and programs

- Born: 1942 (age 83–84); Brooklyn, New York
- Education: Stony Brook University, PhD
- Occupations: Author, professor, social and cultural historian
- Employer: Brandeis University
- Notable work: Jewish Radical Feminism, The Journey Home: How Jewish Women Shaped Modern America, and You Never Call! You Never Write! A History of the Jewish Mother
- Website: https://www.joyceantler.com/

Joyce Antler (born 1942) is an author and Professor Emerita of American Jewish History and Culture, and of Women's, Gender and Sexuality Studies at Brandeis University; she retired from her teaching roles in 2016.

Antler founded Brandeis University's Women's and Gender Studies program, and co-founded MIT's Graduate Consortium of Women Studies. She is one of the founding board members of the Jewish Women's Archive in Brookline, Massachusetts, and was the Chair of its Academic Advisory Council for several years.

== Academic career ==
Antler's book, The Journey Home: Jewish Women and the American Century (1997), was described in The New York Times as a work which elucidates the struggles of sexism and antisemitism faced by a selection of Jewish women whose activism helped to shape American society and culture. Her next notable book, You Never Call! You Never Write!: A History of the Jewish Mother (2007), takes on stereotypes of Jewish mothers. Her 2018 book, Jewish Radical Feminism: Voices from the Women's Liberation Movement, addresses the high rate of participation of Jewish women in the US women's liberation movement of the 1960s and 1970s; it was also a finalist for the 2019 PROSE Awards from the Association of American Publishers.

Apart from her academic prose, Antler has also written plays, including "Year One of the Empire," which was originally written and performed in 1973. The play, written alongside Elinor Fuchs, returned to the stage in 2008.

In the Fall of 2020, Antler delivered the Steinbaum Memorial Lecture at Boston's Temple Israel. In October 2023, Antler took part in a panel discussion alongside Anita Hill titled "Brandeis Women Who Changed the World"; both women have been professors in their respective fields at the institution for years.

== Activism ==
In the 1970s, Joyce Antler's activism was crucial to the eventual repeal of New York's abortion ban, three years before Roe v. Wade made abortion legal on a federal level (until June 2022 when Roe v. Wade was overturned). The change Antler helped with made New York the first state to allow abortions on demand. In the years that followed, she co-authored works on maternal health for publications including the Bulletin of the History of Medicine.

== Notable works ==
=== Books ===
- Lucy Sprague Mitchell: The Making of a Modern Woman (1987)
- America and I: Short Stories by American Jewish Women Writers (1990)
- The Journey Home: Jewish Women and the American Century (1997)
- Talking Back: Images of Jewish Women in American Popular Culture (1998)
- You Never Call! You Never Write!: A History of the Jewish Mother (2007)
- Jewish Radical Feminism: Voices from the Women's Liberation Movement (2018)

=== Articles ===
- "'After College, What?': New Graduates and the Family Claim" (1980) in American Quarterly
- "Feminism as Life-Process: The Life and Career of Lucy Sprague Mitchell" (1981) in Feminist Studies
- "Progressive Education and the Scientific Study of the Child: An Analysis of the Bureau of Educational Experiments" (1982) in Teachers College Record
- "One Clove Away from a Pomander Ball: The Subversive Potential of Jewish Women's Humor" (2010) in Studies in American Jewish Literature
- "Beyond the Ivory Tower: American Jewish History for a Public Audience" (2014) in American Jewish History
- "History and Gender" (2014) in Frontiers: A Journal of Women's Studies
- "Women's Liberation and Jewish Feminism after 1968: Multiple Pathways to Gender Equality" (2018) in American Jewish History

== See also ==
- Jewish feminism
- List of Jewish feminists
- Heather Booth
- Vivian Rothstein
- Naomi Weisstein
