= St. Timothy's School =

Girls high school in Stevenson, Maryland, US

Location
- 8400 Greenspring Avenue; Stevenson, Maryland 21153; United States; 39°24′27″N 76°41′10″W

Information
- Type: Private boarding school
- Established: 1832
- Head of school: Randy S. Stevens
- Faculty: 44 teachers and staff
- Grades: 9–12
- Gender: Single(Female)
- Enrollment: 175 students
- Campus size: 111.9 acres (0.453 km^{2})
- Colors: Carolina blue and White
- Rival: Bryn Mawr School
- Additional color(s): Brownies: Brown , Spiders: Green
- Website: stt.org

St. Timothy's School is a four-year private all-girls boarding high school in Stevenson, Maryland.

== History ==
St. Timothy's School

The school was founded as a school for girls by Sarah Randolph Carter in Catonsville, Maryland, in 1882. In 1952, the school moved to Stevenson, Maryland; the new school was designed by Robert Hutchins, of the New York City-based firm of Moore & Hutchins. In 1972, the charter and enrollment of Hannah More Academy was transferred to the school. St. Timothy's school is run under the guidance of the Episcopal Church, and offers the International Baccalaureate Diploma Program.

== Academics ==
Students pursue studies through the world-renowned International Baccalaureate (IB) program, recognized internationally for academic excellence. The IB is a nonprofit foundation headquartered in Geneva, Switzerland, and founded in 1968. St. Timothy's offers the IB Diploma Programme and the IB Middle Years Programme. To teach these programs schools must be authorized by the International Baccalaureate.

== Traditions ==
On November 25, 1901, Bryn Mawr School and St. Timothy's began what is thought to be the longest continuous girls' high school basketball rivalry in the country, with a silver cup dedicated to the game passed between the schools. The game was played nine on nine on a court divided into three sections, with groups of three in each section. The uniforms were high-collared white blouses over long corduroy skirts, black stockings and white athletic shoes. The game was played outdoors without a backboard, on a dirt field which would be covered with straw to absorb dampness if necessary. The headmistresses of both schools agreed to a list of rules and conditions and guaranteed that none of the girls' names would be published in the newspapers. The game was moved inside in 1928 as interest in field hockey as an outdoor fall sport grew. In December 2011, the two schools played a game in the old-fashioned clothes and rules to commemorate the first game played between the two schools. In 2012, St. Timothy won their first game in over fifty years. Before the turnaround, the imbalance meant ending the tradition was considered.

The school is also known for its annual intramural basketball game, a tradition that began in the 1890s when co-headmistresses Polly and Sally Carter divided the school's students into two teams named "Brownie" and "Spider". Girls whose sisters or mothers previously attended St. Timothy's are automatically assigned the same team as their family members. The game has been played each year according to the original three-court rules, with players wearing 19th-century tunics.

== Equestrian program ==
St. Timothy's competes in the Interscholastic Equestrian Association (IEA) and attends several United States Equestrian Foundation (USEF) shows each semester. Equestrian facilities include: an indoor arena with 28 stalls and new premium footing, two tack rooms, and wash stalls; an outdoor riding ring with sand and fiber footing; and indoor ring; four private paddocks; and seven large fields - three with run-in sheds.

== Athletics ==
St. Timothy's competes in the Interscholastic Athletic Association of Maryland (IAAM). Facilities include a fitness center, 90-foot regulation basketball court, athletic training room, and team locker rooms. The Grass Family Outdoor Athletic Complex includes six surface tennis courts, a turf field, a new softball field, and grass field. The school supports several sports programs including lacrosse, tennis, dance, softball, field hockey, indoor soccer, volleyball, horse riding, ice hockey, soccer, squash, and badminton. In 2023-2024, the school won the Division C Championship in lacrosse and softball.

== Campus and facilities ==
The school's 145-acre property includes athletic and equestrian facilities, an art barn, admissions cottage, various faculty houses, two dormitory houses, a student center, a working farm, and an academic building. Dixon Hall, the main academic building, was renovated in 2012. The changes include a new library, updated technology, a language lab, and new classrooms. The Five Arts and Student Center, renovated in 2019, has an Art Gallery, Theater, Student Lounge, Dance Studio, and Innovation STEM Lab. The school's dining hall, The Commons, was renovated in 2019 and meals are provided by the Bon Appétit Management Company and the school farm. Since 2019, a reproduction of Kristen Visbal's statue Fearless girl has been displayed at the school arboretum.

== Notable alumnae ==
- Catherine Drinker Bowen, biographer
- Liz Claiborne, fashion designer
- Helen Metcalf Danforth (1887–1984), university president.
- Kimberly Dozier, CBS Reporter who was critically wounded in Iraq War
- Edie Sedgwick, socialite, actress, model, and 'It' girl of 1965
- Sunny von Bülow, heiress and socialite made famous by allegations that her husband attempted to murder her
- Marietta Peabody Tree, a human rights representative under John F. Kennedy and the mother of model Penelope Tree
- Mary Pillsbury Lord, former U.S. delegate to the United Nations General Assembly
- Leila Hadley, socialite and author
- Sophie Drinker, musicologist
- Ernesta Drinker Ballard, horticulturalist and feminist
- Lynden Miller, horticulturalist and author
- Ellen Stevenson (née Borden), socialite and wife of politician Adlai Stevenson II
- Lucy Tamlyn, US Ambassador to the Democratic Republic of the Congo
- Martha Gallaudet Waring, principal

== See also ==
- List of Schools in Baltimore County, Maryland
