= Ernesta Drinker Ballard =

American horticulturalist and feminist (1920–2005)

- Born: Ernesta Drinker; May 13, 1920; Merion, Pennsylvania, US
- Died: August 11, 2005 (aged 85); Philadelphia, US
- Education: Pennsylvania School of Horticulture for Women
- Occupations: Horticulturalist, feminist
- Parent(s): Henry Drinker, Sophie Drinker

Ernesta Drinker Ballard (May 13, 1920 – August 11, 2005) was an American horticulturalist and feminist. Among the founders of the National Organization for Women, the National Abortion and Reproductive Rights Action League, and Women's Way, Ballard was the executive director of the Pennsylvania Horticultural Society from 1963 to 1981, credited by The New York Times with bringing its annual Philadelphia Flower Show to "international prominence."

== Life ==
Ernesta Drinker was born in 1920 to Henry Drinker, a well-known lawyer, and Sophie Hutchinson Drinker. She grew up in Merion, Pennsylvania. She aspired to pursue law as a career, but her father expected her to become a wife and mother instead. Discouraged from attending college, she attended the Episcopal St. Timothy's School in Maryland, married lawyer Frederick Ballard in 1939, and had four children. However, as she later commented, she "grew tired of just being somebody's wife and somebody's mother; she wanted to be somebody in her own right."

In 1954, Ballard graduated from the Pennsylvania School of Horticulture for Women (now part of Temple University) and established her own horticulture business, Valley Gardens. She wrote two popular books on plants, The Art of Training Plants (1962) and Garden in Your House (1971), and hosted radio shows that gave gardening tips.

In 1964, Ballard closed Valley Gardens to become the director of the Pennsylvania Horticultural Society. At the time, the Philadelphia Flower Show was a separate organization, and was in such a poor state of organization that the group who ran it had decided to cancel the show for two years. Fearing that the public would lose interest in the show if it was dormant for that long, Ballard persuaded the Horticultural Society's board to stage the show in 1965; in 1968, the society became the show's official producer. As the show's chief organizer, Ballard expanded the annual event and made it “much more participatory” and educational in nature. Under Ballard's leadership, which lasted until 1980, the Pennsylvania Horticultural Society became a thriving organization, and the Philadelphia Flower Show grew to become one of the largest indoor flower shows in the United States.

As president of the Pennsylvania Horticultural Society, Ballard took the University of Pennsylvania to task for its neglect of the Morris Arboretum, which it had inherited from its former owners. The lawyer who accompanied her recalled that Ballard was "like a drill boring . . . into stone", in wearing down the resistance of university officials, who responded and developed the arboretum into what it became.

Ultimately, Ballard felt that the best legacy she could leave was to empower her own daughters to help to empower other women. One of her three daughters was the prominent Philadelphia women's rights and employment rights attorney, Alice W. Ballard (1948–2025).

== Ernesta Drinker Ballard Book Prize ==
Women's Way annually awards the Ernesta Drinker Ballard Book Prize to a recently published female author who has helped make headway in the dialogue about women's rights through her work. The 2012 winner was Rebecca Traister for her book Big Girls Don’t Cry.
