= Jewish Radical Feminism =

Academic book

Jewish Radical Feminism: Voices from the Women’s Liberation Movement
- Author: Joyce Antler
- Language: en
- Publisher: NYU Press
- Publication date: May 4, 2018
- Pages: 453
- ISBN: 9780814707630
- Dewey Decimal: 305.42089/924073
- LC Class: 2017045030

Jewish Radical Feminism is a 2018 book by Joyce Antler (b. 1942). Antler is a Professor Emerita of American Jewish History and Culture, and of Women's, Gender and Sexuality Studies at Brandeis University.

== Content ==
Antler's book investigates the high rate of participation of Jewish women in the women's liberation movement of the 1960s and 1970s within the United States. She notes that, by her estimates, "in some collectives in large cities, two-thirds to three-quarters of women’s liberation participants may have been Jewish." Yet, the large number of Jewish women in the movement did not seem, Antler argues, all that evident in general histories of the feminist movement. Thus, as Shulamit Magnus's review of Antler's book notes, Jewish Radical Feminism addresses an important series of questions:

What accounts for the very disproportionate role of Jews in this movement, and why was their Jewishness not a factor in the consciousness of many of these activists? Why was their common Jewishness, for all the diversity in their Jewish background and expression, not something they noticed, much less pondered; their Jewishness invisible, even to themselves? Why did so many “never talk about” Jewishness and women’s liberation until Antler asked them to?

=== Methods ===
To answer these questions, Antler interviewed over forty women, whom she classified as belonging to either "women's liberation collectives who at that time did not identify Jewishly" or "collectives whose members did explicitly identify as Jewish." While all women in the study were Jewish (religiously and/or culturally), those in the former of the two groups did not forefront their Jewishness in their activism at that time. She had gathered these forty women together at a conference titled “Women’s Liberation and Jewish Identity: Uncovering a Legacy of Innovation, Activism and Social Change” several years prior to the book's publication.

In addition to interviews, Antler used secondary literature on the women's movement in the US, memoirs, and documents (published and unpublished) to sketch out the role of Jewish women in the feminist activism of the 1960s and 1970s (the "second-wave"), and to better understand if and how Jewishness played a role in how these women approached their work.

== Reception ==
Jewish Radical Feminism was a finalist for the 2019 PROSE Award in Biography (from the Association of American Publishers).

In a 2018 article from Contemporary Jewry, Tahneer Oksman called Antler's book a "compelling, original, and urgent reexamination of the past." Similarly, a review from the Jewish Book Council stated that Jewish Radical Feminism was "important, accessible, and inspiring."

Another Jewish publication, Tablet, offered both praise and criticism of the book in an article from Rachel Shteir. Shteir praised the book's "fresh look at not only the movement’s past but also its present and future," but she also noted that, by "Covering so much, Jewish Radical Feminism cannot do justice to all of its subjects. Sometimes an earnest, anodyne triumphalism creeps in to the writing."

== See also ==
- Jewish feminism
