= Ellen Stevenson =

American socialite and First Lady of Illinois

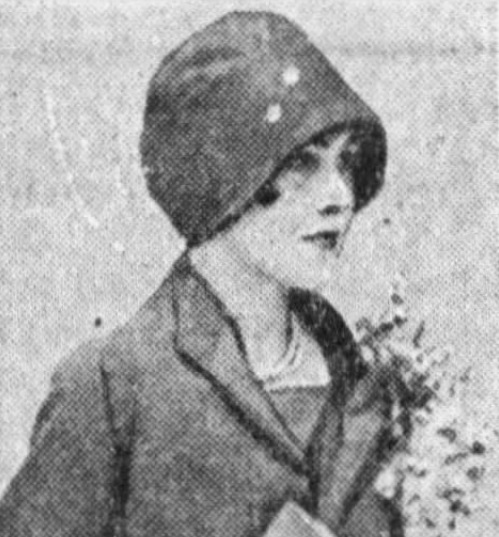
- Ellen Borden in 1928

First Lady of Illinois
- In role January 10, 1949 – December 12, 1949
- Governor: Adlai Stevenson
- Preceded by: Mabel Green
- Succeeded by: Shirley Stratton

Personal details
- Born: Ellen Waller Borden; December 14, 1907 Chicago, Illinois, U.S.
- Died: July 28, 1972 (aged 64) East Chicago, Indiana, U.S.
- Spouse: Adlai Stevenson (m. 1928; div. 1949)
- Children: 3, including Adlai III

Ellen Waller Stevenson (née Borden; December 14, 1907 – July 28, 1972) was an American socialite who was the First Lady of Illinois in 1949, having been married to Adlai Stevenson II, who became Governor of Illinois that year. She was the mother of his three children, including Adlai Stevenson III, who became a U.S. Senator. She divorced her husband within a year of his election to the governorship, and was noted for thereafter occasionally commenting on his political activities, including his two unsuccessful campaigns for the presidency, with a characteristic acerbic wit.

== Early life, education, and marriage ==
Born in Chicago, Illinois, to parents John Borden and Ellen Wallace Walker, Borden "attended the exclusive University School for Girls in Chicago and St. Timothy's School in Maryland". Although she did not go to college, she did spend a year in Italy, studying art "at Miss Sheldon's and Miss Nixon's school at Florence". She made her debut in 1926, and was presented at the court of St. James in the spring of 1927.

In September 1928, Borden's engagement to Adlai Stevenson II was announced, and on December 1, 1928, they married. The young couple soon became popular and familiar figures on the Chicago social scene; they especially enjoyed attending and hosting costume parties. They had three sons: Adlai Stevenson III, who would become a U.S. Senator; Borden Stevenson, and John Fell Stevenson. Through her eldest son, she had one grandchild, followed by a great grandchild, those being Adlai Stevenson IV and Adlai Stevenson V. In 1935, Adlai and Ellen purchased a 70-acre (28 ha) tract of land along the Des Plaines River near Libertyville, Illinois, a wealthy suburb of Chicago. They built a home on the property and it served as Adlai Stevenson's official residence for the rest of his life.

== First Lady of Illinois, divorce, and later life ==
Adlai Stevenson took office as Governor of Illinois on January 10, 1949, making Ellen the First Lady of Illinois. In late September of that year, the couple announced that they were divorcing, stating that the separation was amicable and that they were considering whether to file in Illinois or in Nevada, the latter having a quicker and more lenient divorce process. On December 12, 1949, Adlai and Ellen were finally divorced; their son Adlai III later recalled that "There hadn't been a good relationship for a long time. I remember her [Ellen] as the unreasonable one, not only with Dad, but with us and the servants. I was embarrassed by her peremptory way with servants". Several of Stevenson's biographers have written that his wife suffered from mental illness: "Incidents that went from petulant to bizarre to nasty generally have been described without placing them in the context of the progression of [her] increasingly serious mental illness. It was an illness that those closest to her – including Adlai for long after the divorce – were slow and reluctant to recognize. Hindsight, legal proceedings, and psychiatric testimony now make understandable the behavior that baffled and saddened her family". Her happiest times were in Chicago, where "she used to write sonnets, was considered a better than average poetess, and had a fairly good play in verse produced by a college theater". Stevenson "complained that Adlai's friends always talked politics or economics. They didn't understand art. In fact, they didn't even know the difference between a sonnet and a canto".

Ellen Stevenson returned to attending public high society events in she Spring of 1950, using the name Ellen Borden Stevenson. Later that year, Adlai Stevenson was reported to be a candidate to replace Dean Acheson as United States Secretary of State, and it was rumored that Ellen might reconcile with him, as there continued to be mutual affection between them, but no reconciliation ultimately occurred. In the 1960s, Stevenson became the 5th United States Ambassador to the United Nations, and Ellen Stevenson "rose to national prominence when she labeled her former husband a 'Hamlet who can't make up his mind' about running for president". During the 1956 United States presidential election, she congratulated Adlai for winning the Democratic nomination, but stated that she could not vote for him, and preferred the incumbent Republican President Eisenhower. At one point, she planned to publish a book critical of her ex-husband, to be titled The Egghead and I, but cancelled the publication in October 1956, when it became clear that the book would not become available in time for the election. Columnist Robert Ruark wrote a piece opining that Ellen's dismissive comments actually aided Adlai's campaigns by making him a more sympathetic figure to those who generally opposed divorce at that time.

In 1964, "at the request of her mother and her three sons, a conservator was appointed for her estate", on the grounds that she was "incapable of managing her estate because of an imperfection of mentality". Ellen Borden Stevenson died from cancer at St. Catherine's Hospital in Chicago, at the age of 64.

== Sources ==
- Martin, John Bartlow . Adlai Stevenson of Illinois: The Life of Adlai E. Stevenson (1976) and Adlai Stevenson and the World: The Life of Adlai E. Stevenson (1977), the standard scholarly biography
- McKeever, Porter (1989). Adlai Stevenson: His Life and Legacy. New York: William Morrow and Company. ISBN 978-0-688-06661-1.
