= Margaret Hope Bacon =

Margaret Hope Bacon (née Borchardt; April 7, 1921 – February 24, 2011) was an American Quaker historian, author and lecturer. She is primarily known for her biographies and works involving Quaker women’s history and the abolitionist movement. Her most famous book is her biography of Lucretia Mott, Valiant Friend, published in 1980.

== Biography ==
Bacon spent her early childhood in New York City and moved to Florida as an adolescent. She went to Antioch College, where she met her husband, Allen Bacon. During World War II, she accompanied her husband to work at Springfield Hospital in Sykesville, Maryland as his assignment for conscientious objector status.

She worked at the American Friends Service Committee for many years and was the inspiration for the rehabilitation of the Fair Hill Burial Ground, a historic Quaker cemetery in North Philadelphia and the final resting place of abolitionists Lucretia Mott and Robert Purvis. Bacon authored biographies of both Mott and Purvis. A longtime trustee and Vice President of the Pennsylvania Abolition Society, she wrote a feature article titled "The Pennsylvania Abolition Society's Mission for Black Education" for the Historical Society of Pennsylvania's November 2005 newsletter.

She was a founding board member of Women's Way, the country’s oldest and largest funding federation for women’s organizations. Bacon died at her home at Crosslands in Kennett Square, Pennsylvania on February 24, 2011, aged 79.

== Awards ==
- City of Philadelphia Human Rights award, 1976
- Honorary Doctor of Humane Letters, Swarthmore College, 1981
- City of Philadelphia Citation for Contributions to Women’s History, 1987

== Works ==
=== Non-fiction ===
- The Quiet Rebels: The Story of Quakers in America (1969).
- Lamb’s warrior: The life of Isaac T. Hopper (1970)
- I speak for my Slave Sister; the life of Abby Kelly Foster (1974)
- Rebellion at Christiana (1975)
- Valiant Friend: The life of Lucretia Mott (1980)
- As the way opens: the story of Quaker women in America (1980).
- Mothers of feminism: The story of Quaker Women in America (1986).
- Let this life speak: The legacy of Henry Joel Cadbury (1987).
- One woman’s passion for peace and freedom: The life of Mildred Olmsted (1992).
- Wilt thou go on my errand? The journals of three eighteenth century Quaker women (1994).
- The quiet rebels: The story of Quakers in America (1999).
- Love is the hardest lesson (a memoir) (1999)
- Abby Hopper Gibbons: Prison reformer and social activist (2000).
- In the shadow of William Penn: Central Philadelphia Monthly Meeting (2001).
- Sarah Mapps Douglass: Faithful attender of Quaker Meeting (2003).
- Back to Africa: Benjamin Coates and the colonization movement in America, 1848-1880. (2005), edited by Emma J. Lapsansky-Werner and Margaret Hope Bacon.
- But one race: the life of Robert Purvis (2007).

=== Fiction ===
- The night they burned Pennsylvania Hall: a chapter in the struggle for liberation of slaves and women. (1992) (a play for children)
- Year of grace (2002).
- The back bench (2007.
