= University School for Girls =

Coordinates: 41.93576°N 87.63933°W

The University School for Girls was a private high school in Chicago during the early to mid-20th century. Although less prestigious than the Latin School for Girls, it was "one of the city's most elegant educational institutions," and drew similarly from the daughters of the city's elite.

The University School was founded by Anna R. Haire in 1897. She was an experienced educational administrator, and a graduate of Smith College. Haire remained principal until 1940, dying shortly thereafter in 1941. The school appears to have folded shortly after her death.

For its first three decades, the University School was located on the 1100 block of north Lake Shore Drive, at the corner with Elm Street. A suitably elegant four-story building was constructed for it in 1909-1910.

In 1930, the school moved to a new location, further north, at the intersection of Sheridan Road and Oakdale.

== Notable alumnae ==
- Ellen Stevenson,
- Evelyn Greeley (disputed)
- Jocelyn Crane Griffin
- Celeste Holm
- Alicia Patterson
- Nancy Reagan

== Works cited ==
- Bruegmann, Robert (1997). The Architects and the City: Holabird & Roche of Chicago, 1880-1918. ISBN 0226076954.
