= Edith May =

American writer (Anne Drinker; 1827–1903)

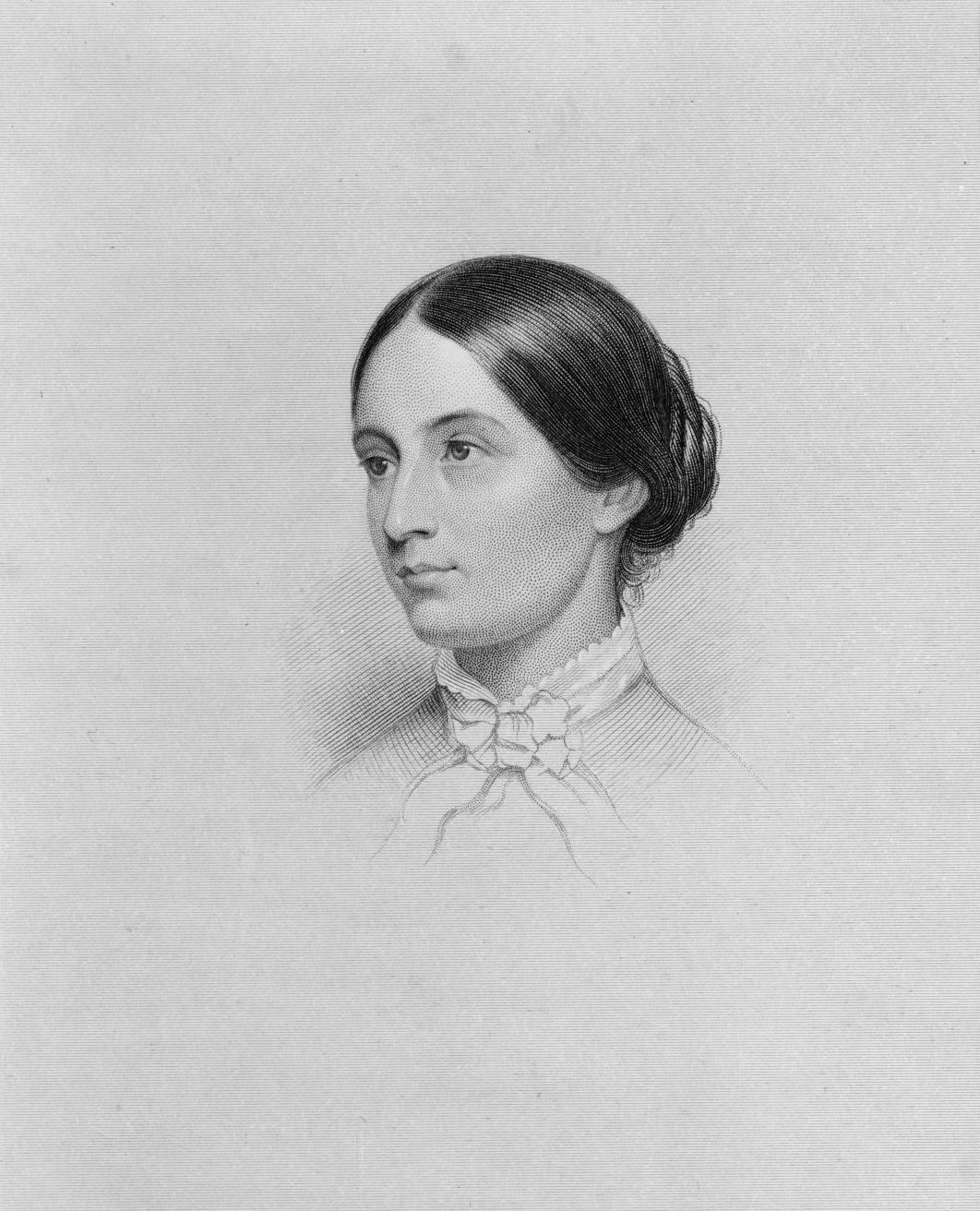
- Photo by Robert Whitechurch
- Born: Anne Drinker; 3 December 1827; Philadelphia, Pennsylvania, U.S.
- Died: 23 February 1903 (aged 75); Edgemont, Pennsylvania, U.S.
- Resting place: Rockdale, Pennsylvania, U.S.
- Occupation: Writer
- Relatives: Elizabeth Sandwith Drinker
- Writing career
- Pen name: Edith May

Signature
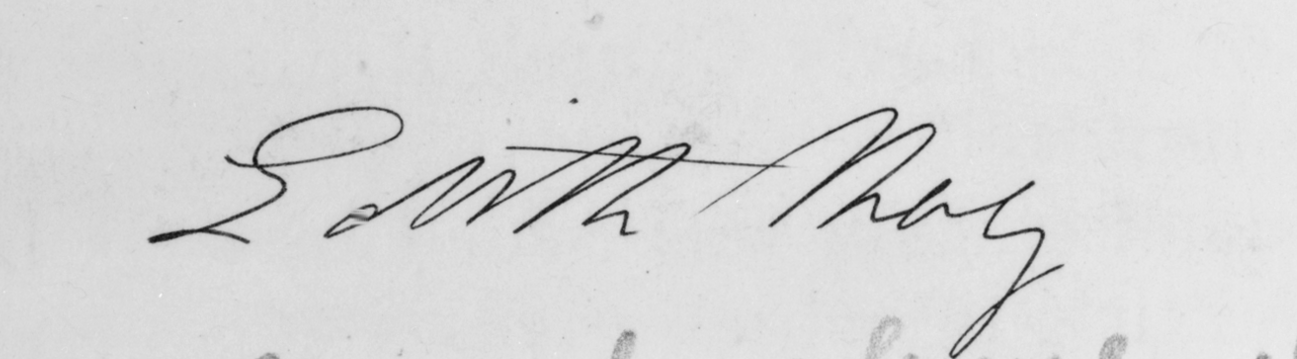

Edith May was the pen name of Anne Drinker (3 December 1827 – 23 February 1903), an American writer of verse and other matter for literary journals and magazines. Born in Philadelphia, Pennsylvania, she summered in Montrose where she resided chiefly during most of her life. In her early days, she was an esteemed member of society in Philadelphia, New York City, and Washington, D.C. For ten years, she was confined against her will in a state lunatic asylum. Persisting on her behalf, and with the passage of improved legislation, she was released and became a recluse.

== Early life and education ==
Anne (or Anna or Annie) Drinker (or Drinkwater) was born in Philadelphia, December 3, 1827. Her parents were Joseph D. Drinker (1796-1881), a wealthy Philadelphia merchant, and Eleanor/Elinor Skyrin Drinker (died 1877), daughter of John and Ann (Drinker) Skyrin, a land owner.

May was the eldest of eight children, including the siblings Joseph ("Joe"), Charles Frances, Frances, Eleanor. Her lineage dates back to an old English family of the same name. The first of the Drinkers to arrive in the United States came about 15–18 years subsequent to the landing of the Pilgrims on Plymouth Rock. This was Philip Drinker who, with his wife and several children, took up his residence in New England, and immediately identified himself with the life of the Puritans in that section of the country. He became rich and influential. One of his sons became Governor of Cape Colony, and during the early days of the Colonial history preceding the breaking out of the Revolution, others of the name occupied conspicuous positions. The passing of years and the growth of the country brought about divisions in the family. Some remained in New England, others removed to New York state, while the remainder passed over into Pennsylvania. The first of the Drinkers to settle in Philadelphia was John Drinker. With his wife, Ruth Balch, he came there a few years before the founding of the city by William Penn in 1682, when the riverfront was occupied by a few Swedish settlers and by Native Americans. Edward Drinker was born in Philadelphia in 1680. His children married into some of the best families of the period. Among these were the Benezets, of distinguished French ancestry. It was a daughter of this family who was the mother of Edith May.

Her great-grandfather, Henry Drinker, founded the family estate of 500,000 acres (200,000 ha) in Susquehanna County, Pennsylvania and neighboring counties of the state. She was also a descendant of Elizabeth Sandwith Drinker, the diarist.

May was reared amid refined surroundings, and as she got older, she received the best education that the private schools of Philadelphia could provide. Following the education in her native city, she was sent abroad, where special attention was given to her musical development and also to the study of German, French and Spanish. When she returned to Philadelphia, she was prepared to make her formal entrance into society. Though she was received into the most exclusive circles, this admiration did not affect May. Thoughtful and studious, she devoted her attention to the poor, needy, and sick of the city.

== Career ==
Beginning in 1848, her literary ambitions were encouraged by Nathaniel Parker Willis, of the Home Journal, while she also wrote for Peterson's Magazine and other periodicals, such as Sartain's Magazine. Using the pen name of "Edith May", the poems she wrote at an early age were considered to have the strength and finish of a more experienced writer. Spofford & Gibbon (1893) described them as being "fellicities of expression, dramatic faculty, and occasional imaginative power".

May published three books: Poems by Edith May (Philadelphia 1854), Tales and Verses for Children (1855), and Katy's Story or Poems and Tales.

== Confinement and release ==
May's family pressured her to marry. She became attached to a prominent young society man, the editor, Nathaniel Parker Willis, who had been one of her most earnest suitors. This match was broken off after the discovery by May that he was carrying on a relationship with another woman. This event instilled a resolve in May that she would never marry. A subsequent depression led her, in 1874, to check into a private asylum in Philadelphia, seeking rest. May's mother, Elinor, died in 1877 and left all her land to her children.

May's father was forced to mortgage the family home. By one account (Press Sun Bulletin , 1984), the father's greed may have led him to want May to be declared insane and incapable of handling her estate, as, in 1878, a Montrose court declared May to be insane at the request of her father who died in 1881.

By another account (The Philadelphia Inquirer, 1903), William Cooper, a banker and May's guardian, had her committed to a sanitarium on the ground that she was insane. What means he took to accomplish this or what evidence there was of insanity was unknown. Some hinted that it was disappointment in love, while others maintained that back of it was a plot by which Cooper hoped to gain possession of the May's share in the estate.

One night, in 1884, May's brother, Joe, waited for William Cooper on one of the main streets in Montrose. As Cooper passed, Joe fired a shot from a pistol and Cooper fell. Almost instantly, another shot was fired and Joe fell a victim of his own bullet, following which Joe also swallowed poison. Cooper was taken to a hospital, where he died two weeks later, while Joe recovered. At the time, May was residing in the Danville Insane Asylum (now, Danville State Hospital). According to Joe, May's confinement was one of the reasons why he shot Cooper as Cooper did not use his influence years earlier to prevent the incarceration of his sister. The newspapers wrote that the same psychological disorder that affected May's reasoning prompted her brother to shoot Cooper in order to avenge his sister.

In 1885, the asylum's authorities granted May a month's leave of absence, and she was taken to the convalescent's retreat at the Pennsylvania State Lunatic Hospital (now, Harrisburg State Hospital). After her arrival there, she showed no symptoms of insanity, and the leave of absence was extended indefinitely. Persisting on her behalf, and with the passage of improved legislation, May was released from the Pennsylvania State Lunatic Hospital later that year, after being confined for a total of ten years.

Then came Joe's trial on the charge of murder. He boldly asserted his fearlessness of death and said he had avenged his sister and was satisfied. May came at once to her brother's side and spent the greater part of her inheritance to save Joe's life. The jury rendered a verdict of insanity. Joe was sent to an insane asylum and May retired from society, but continued to write poetry, including a poem in 1887 celebrating the centennial of the Montrose historical society. In her later years, May possessed sufficient income to enjoy a good life.

== Death and legacy ==
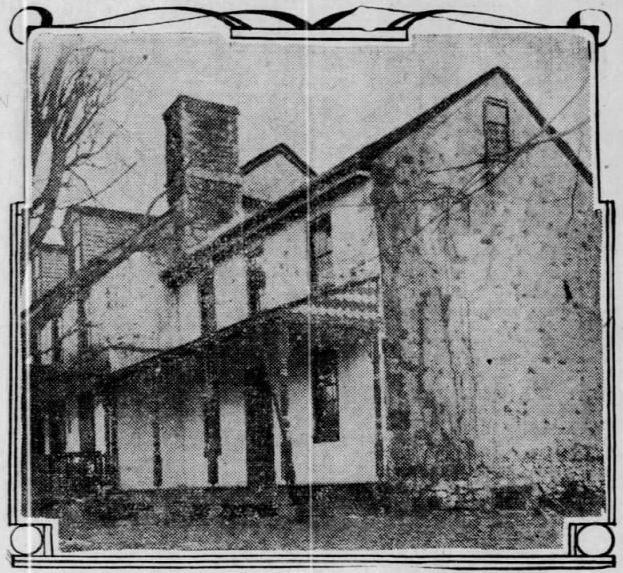
Annie Drinker home in Edgemont, Pennsylvania (1903)

She became reclusive and died in Edgemont, Pennsylvania in 1903. She was buried at the Episcopal Churchyard in Rockdale, Pennsylvania.

May's portrait was painted by Thomas Sully in 1850.

A play honoring May's life, The Rage of Society, written by playwright Jan Quackenbush, was produced in 1984 in Susquehanna, Pennsylvania.
