= Women's Way =

Women's advocacy group

- Founded: 1977
- Founder: Lynn Yeakel; Louise Page; Ernesta Drinker Ballard (first president); Margaret Bacon; Winnie Schoefer; Cathy Strauss
- Purpose: Women, Children, Families
- Location: 1617 John F Kennedy Blvd., Suite 2043, Philadelphia, PA 19103
- Region served: Greater Philadelphia Area
- Method: Grantmaking, advocacy, education
- Website: womensway.org

Women's Way is a grantmaking, advocacy, and education 501(c)(3) status nonprofit that deals with current issues facing women and girls in the greater Philadelphia region.

Several women-focused nonprofits formed the organization in the late-1970s in response to financial struggles. The causes they served at the time were controversial and hard to fund.

In more recent years, Women's Way has focused its scope with a comprehensive advocacy/public policy program. The issues it addresses include: women's health (which spans from reproductive choices to maternal health care), domestic and community violence (including human trafficking and sex trafficking), workplace equity and economic self-sufficiency for women, the empowerment and leadership development of girls, and the underrepresentation of women in positions of leadership and elected office.

As of 2013, Women's Way's Executive Director is Wendy Voet.

Its vision statement says it works to create a "powerful voice for women."

== History ==
=== Founding ===
Lynn Yeakel, Louise Page, Ernesta Drinker Ballard, Margaret Bacon, Winnie Schoefer, and Cathy Strauss originally formed Women's Way as an umbrella organization in 1976 when several struggling Philadelphia-based women-centered nonprofits decided to unite to pool their resources and establish a greater capacity for advocacy and fundraising. The coalition consisted of seven founding member agencies: Options, a group that provided worker support and sought equal pay and opportunity in the workplace; WOAR, the only rape crisis center in Philadelphia at the time; Women's Law Project, a group advocating for women through legal means; Elizabeth Blackwell Health Center for Women, an independent nonprofit gynecological and abortion clinic and birth center; Women in Transition, a counseling service for women undergoing separation and divorce; and the Pennsylvania Program for Women and Girl Offenders, a group seeking to help women and girls transition back into society after incarceration. Through this unification, Women's Way became the first umbrella women's funding federation in the United States.

Shortly after obtaining seed money from the William Penn Foundation, Women's Way elected Ernesta Drinker Ballard as its first president.

In 1978 Women's Way held its first annual dinner, the Powerful Voice Awards. There the organization awarded Coretta Scott King the first Lucretia Mott Award, an award they continue to present.

=== Clash with United Way ===
Women's Way gained publicity in 1980 after a clash with fellow nonprofit United Way. Women's Way applied for United Way membership, but United Way denied the application because, according to their rejection letter, some of Women's Way's member agencies supported abortion and birth control, which violated an agreement United Way had with the Archdiocese of Philadelphia. In response to Women's Way's confrontation and public backlash, United Way introduced the Donor Choice, allowing participating Philadelphia employees to designate a payroll deduction to a nonprofit, even if that nonprofit is not a member of United Way.

=== Notable Events and Conferences ===
On November 8 through November 10, 1987, Women's Way held its first national conference in honor of the 200th anniversary of the Constitution. Titled Unfinished Agenda: Women's Future Under the Constitution, it dealt with and developed an agenda addressing women's evolving status under the Constitution, particularly as it pertained to education, violence, economic equality, and reproductive choice. Over 85 speakers presented, including Ellen Goodman, Gloria Steinem, The Hon. William Gray, III, Eleanor Holmes Norton, Gerda Lerner, Lynn Yeakel, Cynthia J. Little, Maggie Kuhn, Yolanda King, and Helen Reddy. Women's Way invited "[a]ll those interested in the past, present, and future of American women."

Other notable events include 1990's Women in Concert, featuring Dionne Warwick, the Judds and the Roches and hosted by Olympia Dukakis, as well as 1995's stand-up comedy show Humor Her, featuring Margaret Cho, Leighann Lord, and Pam Matteson. Both events acted as fund raisers.

=== 20th Anniversary Mural ===
Women's Way unveiled its 20th anniversary mural in 1999. Located between 21st and 22nd streets on JFK Boulevard, the mural depicted women and girls from all walks of life, an American flag, a jean jacket decorated with feminist pins, shirts with white, blue, and pink collars, various accoutrements of the modern day woman (including a packed calendar, make up, a cell phone, an apron, a sneaker, and a ballet slipper), and the Women's Way logo. Local artist Diane Keller worked with WOMEN'S WAY and Philadelphia's Mural Arts Program to design and paint the mural.

=== The 2000s to Present ===
The 2000s brought new initiatives to Women's Way: the first Women and Influence Conference in 2002, the first A Change of Pace research report in 2003, the first Women's Issues Summit in 2005, the launching of the Community Women's Fund in 2006, and the first Ernesta Drinker Ballard Book Prize in 2007.

In 2008 Women's Way launched public education and advocacy/public policy programs. The group further restructured in 2011 by launching a new grantmaking program, Women's Way's Action Partners, which replaced its previous member agency program. The first group of Action Partners, six in total, were announced on July 31, 2012.

== Philosophy ==
Women's Way's states its vision to be: "Women's Way is the leading funding, advocacy and education organization for women in the Greater Philadelphia region, at the forefront of identifying needs, sharing knowledge and building awareness to challenge social inequities and empower women."

It prioritizes collaboration, adaptability, addressing unmet and/or previously unrecognized needs, and approaching entrenched issues in fresh and original ways.

== Grantmaking ==
Women's Way provides grants to other nonprofits through three grantmaking programs.

The Community Women's Fund awards grants annually to groups that provide direct services to or advocate for the elderly, LGBTQ, immigrants, the disabled, low-income families, and incarcerated women, or groups that promote reproductive rights, economic equality for women, comprehensive sexual education, and leadership development for girls. Past recipients include Wings for Success, Norris Square Neighborhood Project, and Women's Medical Fund.

Women's Way also selects up to six nonprofits that reflect their mission to develop deeper relationships with. These groups, dubbed Action Partners, receive up to three years of general operating support.

Finally, through Women for Social Innovation (a giving circle managed by Women's Way), Women's Way awards seed money to an emerging nonprofit every year via The Turning Point Prize. This emerging nonprofit must innovatively address a difficult problem facing a specific population of women, girls, or families through entrepreneurial solutions. Past groups to receive the Turning Point Prize include Mommy Grads, Rock to the Future, and the Empowered Mom's Thinktank.

Women's Way will not fund groups against reproductive choice or same-sex marriage.

As of 2012, Jennifer Leith is Women's Way's Director of Grantmaking.

== Advocacy and public policy ==
Women's Way advocates for violence prevention for women and girls, for the expansion of reproductive rights and women's access to healthcare, and for female economic equality and independence.

Women's Way is the chair of the Southeastern Pennsylvania branch of Raising Women's Voices and works with the National Women's Health Network to ensure women's health concerns are addressed in federal health care reform.

Additionally, Women's Way works with the Coalition for Healthy Families and Workplaces to gain paid sick days for Philadelphia workers and their families. With Women's Way's help, the Promoting Healthy Families and Workplaces (Bill No. 080474) was passed by city council in June 2011, but Mayor Michael Nutter later vetoed it. Eventually an abbreviated version was passed.

As of 2012, Jen Horwitz is Women's Way's Director of Public Policy.

=== Human trafficking ===
==== State-level Advocacy ====
Women's Way is collaborating with Senator Daylin Leach to pass The National Human Trafficking Resource Center Hotline Act (SB338) in the Pennsylvania Congress. This act would require certain pertinent establishments (such as truck and rest stops, welcome centers, and bus stations) to post the hotline phone number, giving trafficking victims greater access to help.

==== City-level Advocacy ====
At the local level, Women's Way is working to introduce legislation in the Philadelphia City Council, both to establish assistance for survivors of human trafficking and to require massage establishments, where human trafficking scams are often run, to obtain licenses.

Women's Way and Philadelphia City Councilwoman Blondell Reynolds Brown worked together to raise local support for SB 338 and passed a resolution making January Human Trafficking Month.

==== Other ====
To gain support of these policy changes, Women's Way held several screenings of the movies The Whistleblower and Very Young Girls. These screenings were followed by panel discussions about human trafficking in the Philadelphia area.

== Public Education ==
=== Women's Issues Summit ===
Every year Women's Way gathers representatives from regional nonprofits serving women, girls, and families for the Women's Issues Summit. The representatives meet in small themed groups to identify the top emerging issues in their fields and then report back to the group at large. Women's Way uses this information to help decide how to allocate funds for grantmaking and to establish its advocacy agenda. It also encourages networking between organizations during the summit.

=== Women and Influence Conference ===
The Women and Influence Conference is a public forum focused instead on one specific issue decided upon ahead of time. 2011's theme was Taking Charge: Women and Work.

=== Ernesta Drinker Ballard Book Prize ===
Women's Way also annually awards the Ernesta Drinker Ballard Book Prize to a recently published female author who has helped make headway in the dialogue about women's rights through her work.

Ernesta Drinker Ballard Book Prize winners
Author	Title	Year
Joan Blades and Kristin Rowe-Finkbeiner	The Motherhood Manifesto	2007
Ann Fessler	The Girls Who Went Away: The Hidden History of Women Who Surrendered Children for Adoption in the Decades Before Roe v. Wade	2008
Laurel Thatcher Ulrich	Well-Behaved Women Seldom Make History	2009
Michelle Goldberg	The Means of Reproduction: Sex, Power, and the Future of the World	2010
Rebecca Traister	Big Girls Don’t Cry: The Election that Changed Everything for Women	2012
Madeleine Kunin	The New Feminist Agenda: Defining the Next Revolution for Women, Work and Family	2013
Jody Raphael	Rape is Rape: How Denial, Distortion, and Victim-Blaming are Fueling a Hidden Acquaintance Rape Crisis	2014
Janet Mock	Redefining Realness: My Path to Womanhood, Identity, Love & So Much More	2014
Lindy West	Shrill: Notes from a Loud Woman	2016
Ijeoma Oluo	So You Want to Talk About Race	2018
Mira Jacob	Good Talk: A Memoir in Conversations	2019
Chanel Miller	Know My Name	2020
Imbolo Mbue	How Beautiful We Were	2021
Casey Parks	Diary of a Misfit: A Memoir and A Mystery	2022
Sadeqa Johnson	The House of Eve	2023
Anna Gifty Opoku-Agyeman	The Double Tax: How Women of Color are Overcharged and Underpaid	2026

=== A Change of Pace Research Report ===
Women's Way puts together its signature research report, A Change of Pace, to assess and report on women's socioeconomic status, viewpoints on key political issues, and continuing challenges. The organization then makes its information available to local organizations. It was first released in 2003 and again in 2008.

=== Lunchtime Policy Briefings ===
Women's Way holds biannual Lunchtime Policy Briefings. By registering for participation in a conference call, those interested are given the opportunity to ask questions about a predetermined political topic previously explained by the Director of Public Policy. In the past the calls have discussed how healthcare reform will affect reproductive health and women's health in general.

=== Young Women's Initiative ===
Established in 1997, the Young Women's Initiative is an outreach program engineered around increasing knowledge of women's issues, cultivating community leadership, and creating networking opportunities for women under 40. The initiative offers community service opportunities, quarterly happy hours for her, a book club, and workshops on topics like social media and life balance for to its constituents.

== Action Partners ==
· Alice Paul Institute: a center for young women's leadership development based in Mt. Laurel, New Jersey.

· Childspace Cooperative Development Inc.: an advocacy organization, based in the Germantown section of Philadelphia, focused on issues of economic self-sufficiency for childcare workers, providers, and low-income families in the Philadelphia region.

· Domestic Abuse Project of Delaware County: a comprehensive agency addressing domestic violence prevention and helping victims of domestic violence throughout Delaware County.

· Women’s Law Project: a statewide Philadelphia-based organization focused on high-impact litigation, advocacy, and education dedicated to creating a more just and equitable society by advancing the rights and status of all women throughout their lives.

· Women’s Opportunities Resource Center: located in Center City Philadelphia, promotes social and economic self-sufficiency primarily for economically disadvantaged women and their families through varied programming in the Philadelphia region.

· Women Organized Against Rape: a direct service and advocacy organization, based in Center City Philadelphia, focused on eliminating all forms of sexual violence in Philadelphia.
