= Sophie Drinker =

American musicologist (1888–1967)

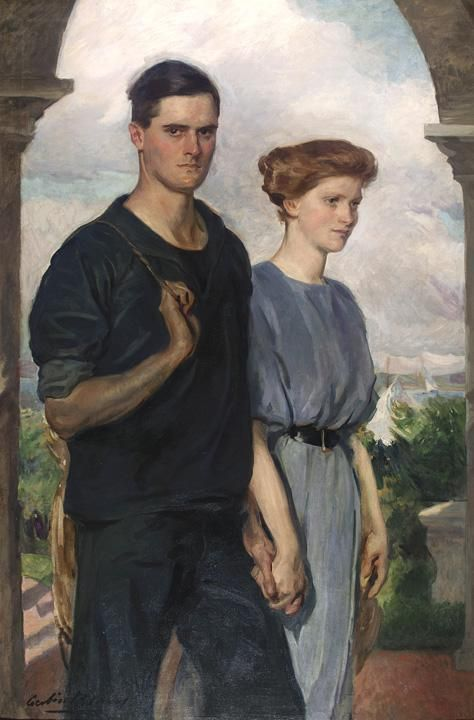
- Sophie and husband, Henry Drinker by Cecilia Beaux
- Born: August 24, 1888; Haverford, Pennsylvania, U.S.
- Died: September 6, 1967 (aged 79)
- Resting place: West Laurel Hill Cemetery, Bala Cynwyd, Pennsylvania, U.S.
- Occupations: author, musicologist
- Spouse: Henry Drinker
- Children: Ernesta Drinker Ballard

Sophie Lewis Drinker (née Hutchinson; August 24, 1888 – September 6, 1967) was an American musicologist and feminist. She published several books on the role of women in the history of music and colonial America. The Sophie Drinker Institute, established in Bremen, Germany, in 2001 as an independent research facility specializing in women's musicological studies and gender research, was named in her honor.

== Early life and education ==
She was born Sophie Lewis Hutchinson on 24 August 1888, in Haverford, Pennsylvania, to Sydney Pemberton Hutchinson and Amy Lewis. As a child, Drinker had piano lessons and developed an interest in music. She attended St. Timothy's School in Maryland. After her graduation in 1906, Drinker was accepted to Bryn Mawr College, but did not attend.

Drinker was awarded an honorary doctorate from Smith College, Northampton, Massachusetts in 1949. She served for a time as a guest lecturer at Woman's Medical College of Pennsylvania, and received an honorary degree in 1967.

== Career ==
She conducted extensive research about women and their place in music history. Her results were published in the book Music and Women: The Story of Women in Their Relation to Music which was released in 1948. The book was widely reviewed by the historical community but did not receive much attention from the musical community until the late twentieth century. The book, argues Ruth A. Solie, has had a major impact on the study of women and music, and has been particularly influential to women in music. In 1995, The Feminist Press re-issued Women and Music, with a preface by Elizabeth Wood and an afterword by Solie. Musicologist and librarian Kathi Meyer-Baer was one of the people Drinker worked with beginning in 1934 until 1942, when the relationship ended acrimoniously. In his biography of Meyer-Baer, David Josephson argued that, lacking any musicological training Drinker depended on the research of numerous others, most of whom received only nominal credit for the work they did.

She published other writings, including the book Brahms and His Women's Choruses (1952) and articles such as "What Price Women's Chorus?" for Music Journal in 1954. Here she developed criteria for compositions for women's choirs which in her view would utilize the full range of the female voice.

Her later works focused on women in colonial America and included Hannah Penn and the Proprietorship of Pennsylvania in 1958, and The American Woman in Colonial and Revolutionary Times, 1565-1800 in 1962.

Drinker was greatly influenced by Mary Ritter Beard, pioneer women's historian, and the democratic, economically oriented history of the "progressive" school to which Beard subscribed. She worked with Beard to establish the World Center for Women's Archives.

Drinker was involved in a number of philanthropic, civic, and women's groups. In the 1950s, she served as an advisor to a chapter of Delta Omicron, though Drinker resigned after several years. She was also involved with the Marriage Council of Philadelphia, the Pennsylvania Society of the National Society of Colonial Dames of America, the Lucy Stone League, the Community Chest, and the League of Women Voters. Because of her work with, and writings on, women, Betty Friedan wanted Drinker to join the first elected board of the National Organization of Women. However, Drinker's health was failing, so her daughter Ernesta volunteered in her place and won election to the board.

Drinker died on 6 September 1967, of cancer and was interred at West Laurel Hill Cemetery in Bala Cynwyd, Pennsylvania.

== Personal life ==
In 1911, Drinker married Henry Sandwith Drinker, a lawyer and musicologist, and moved with him to Merion, Pennsylvania. Henry Drinker was a successful lawyer, and like his wife had an avid interest in music. Apart from active music-making, he devoted himself to the translation of the German text of vocal compositions of great composers into English. Among them are Schubert's songs and Haydn's Creation, and a variety of works by Johann Sebastian Bach, among others, the Christmas Oratorio, the St. John Passion and the St. Matthew Passion.

The couple had five children together: Sophie, Henry S., Jr., Cecelia, Ernesta, and Pemberton.

In 1928, the Drinkers built a new house, which contained a large music room where they regularly organized singing evenings, and sometimes they used the premises of the American Musicological Society for their gatherings. They hosted exclusive singing parties that were invitation only, and involved a dinner prepared by the Drinker household staff with group song and music before and after. Oftentimes these evenings involved the accompaniment of musicians invited from prestigious institutions, such as the Philadelphia Orchestra and Curtis Institute of Music.

She was active in women's choral singing and in 1930, she joined the Montgomery Singers. She later served as the group's president.

== Legacy ==
The Sophie Drinker Institute was founded in Bremen, Germany in 2001. It is an independent research institute that specializes in women's musicological studies and gender research.

== Publications ==
- Music and Women: The Story of Women in Their Relation to Music. New York: Coward-McCann, Inc., 1948; reprint, New York: Feminist Press, 1995.
- Brahms and His Women's Choruses. Merion, 1952.
- "What Price Women's Choruses." Musical Journal 12/1, (1954), p. 19 & 42f.
- The Woman in the Music: A Sociological Study. Zurich: Atlantis, 1955 (German translation: Karl and Irene Geiringer).
- Hannah Penn and the Proprietorship of Pennsylvania, Philadelphia: Priv. print. under the auspices of the National Society of the Colonial Dames of America in the Commonwealth of Pennsylvania, 1958
- Eugenie with Andrus Leonard, Miriam Young Holden: The American Woman in Colonial and Revolutionary Times, 1565-1800: A Syllabus with Bibliography. Philadelphia: University of Pennsylvania Press, 1962
