= Rebecca Traister =

American journalist and author (born 1975)

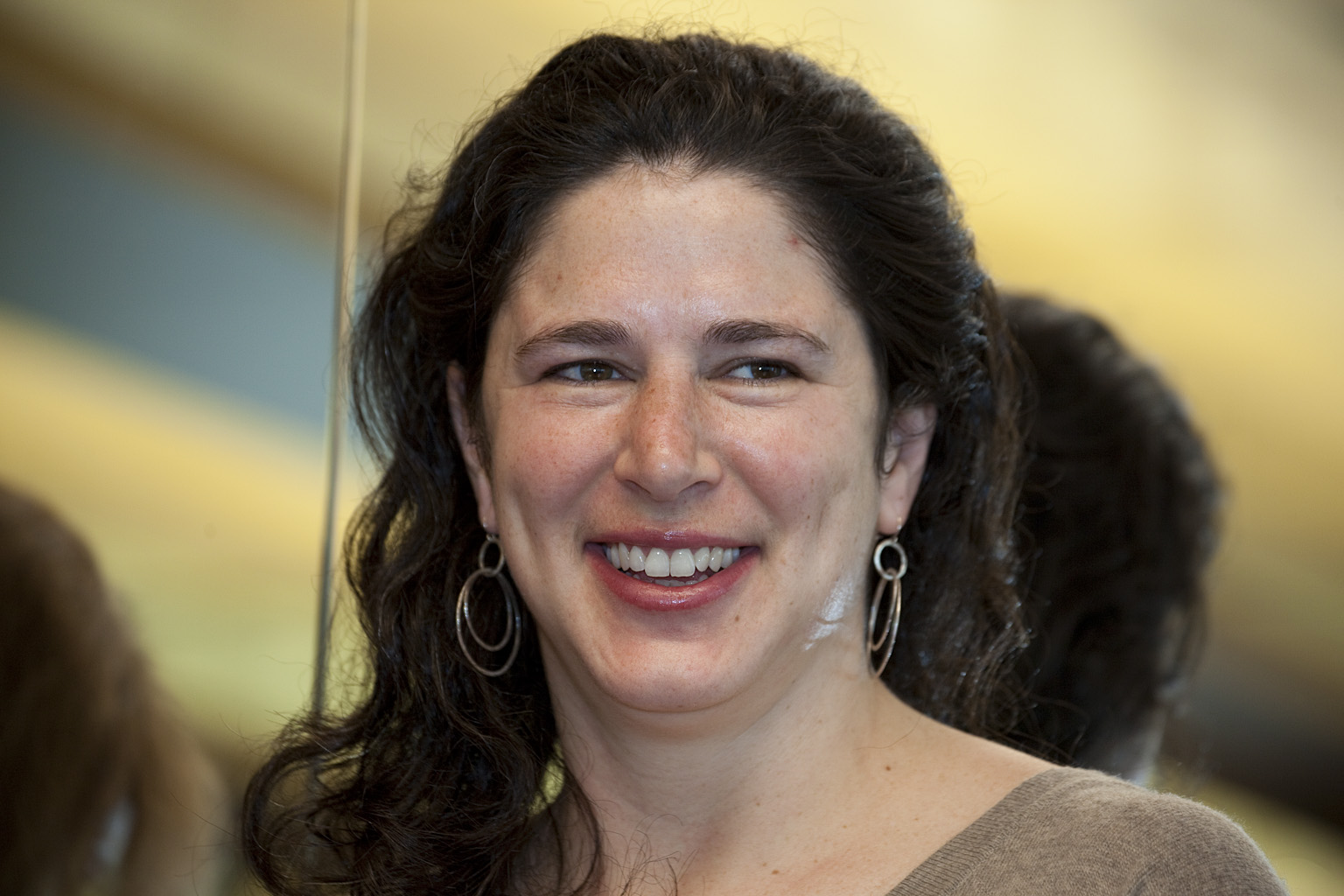
- Traister at the JWA Making Trouble/Making History luncheon, 2012
- Born: 1975 (age 50–51)
- Education: Northwestern University (BA)
- Spouse: Darius Wadia (m. 2011)
- Children: 2
- Writing career
- Genre: Nonfiction
- Notable works: Big Girls Don't Cry; All the Single Ladies; Good and Mad

Rebecca Traister (born 1975) is an American journalist who has covered U.S. politics with a focus on issues affecting women. She is a writer-at-large for New York magazine and has been a frequent guest commentator on cable news networks. She is the author of two bestsellers, All the Single Ladies (2016) and Good and Mad (2018).

== Early life and education ==
Born in 1975 to a Jewish father and Baptist mother, Traister was raised on a farm. She attended Germantown Friends School in Philadelphia, and did her undergraduate work at Northwestern University. After college, she moved to New York City.

== Journalism career ==
Traister began her journalism career in the 2000s at Salon and The New York Observer. For over a decade, she was a freelance writer for Elle magazine, and was eventually named one of its contributing editors. In early 2014, she was hired as senior editor at The New Republic and wrote numerous essays and articles for the magazine over the next eighteen months. In summer of 2015, she became writer-at-large for New York magazine and its website The Cut.

== Writings ==
Traister's first book, Big Girls Don't Cry: The Election that Changed Everything for American Women (2010), is an account of the 2008 U.S. presidential campaign from a feminist perspective. The book examines prominent women in the campaign, including Hillary Clinton, Sarah Palin, Michelle Obama, and Elizabeth Edwards, and the media coverage of them. Big Girls Don't Cry was a New York Times Notable Book of 2010. It later won the Ernesta Drinker Ballard Book Prize from Women's Way.

Traister's second book, All the Single Ladies: Unmarried Women and the Rise of an Independent Nation (2016), grew out of research she initiated in 2009, "the year the proportion of American women who were married dropped below fifty percent; and the median age of first marriages, which had remained between twenty and twenty-two years old for nearly a century (1890–1980), had risen dramatically to twenty-seven." She argues in the book that contrary to media depictions, the phenomenon of single women in America is not new. She chronicles social movements in U.S. history—including temperance, abolition, and secondary education—in which single women, who "were given options beyond early heterosexual marriage", played a significant role. All the Single Ladies became a New York Times bestseller. Gillian White described it as a "well-researched, deeply informative examination of women's bids for independence, spanning centuries."

In 2018, Traister published another bestseller, Good and Mad: The Revolutionary Power of Women's Anger. In a New York Times profile, Hilary Howard said the book "traces the complicated history of female fury, and what that fury has meant for social progress, starting with the suffragist and abolitionist movements of the 19th century and ending with the resistance to the Trump administration." In her New Yorker review, Casey Cep criticized Good and Mad for its tendency to juxtapose "isolated episodes of anger among progressive women of various races, classes, and eras" without building a coherent political argument tying the episodes together. Cep also faulted the book for not paying sufficient attention to the fact that "anger knows no political persuasion. For every Maxine Waters, there's a Michele Bachmann; for every Gloria Steinem, a Phyllis Schlafly." Good and Mad was named one of the Washington Post's Ten Best Books of 2018.

In 2026, Traister published a young reader's edition of Good and Mad entitled Angry Girls Will Get Us Through, adapted by Ruby Shamir, which Kirkus called "a brilliant overview of essential history."

== Awards and recognition ==
In 2018, Traister won a National Magazine Award for Columns and Commentary. She has been nominated for three other National Magazine Awards.

Traister was the winner of the 2016 Hillman Prize for Opinion and Analysis Journalism.

Traister received a "Making Trouble / Making History Award" from the Jewish Women's Archive in 2012 at its annual luncheon. The award was presented by Gloria Steinem.

Also in 2012, Traister won a Mirror Award for Best Commentary in Digital Media for two essays that appeared in Salon ("'30 Rock' Takes on Feminist Hypocrisy–and Its Own," and "Seeing 'Bridesmaids' is a Social Responsibility"), and one that was published in The New York Times ("The Soap Opera Is Dead! Long Live The Soap Opera!").

== Personal life ==
In 2011, Traister married Darius Wadia, a public defender. The couple live in New York, with their two daughters.

== Books ==
- Big Girls Don't Cry: The Election that Changed Everything for American Women. Simon & Schuster. 14 September 2010. ISBN 978-1-4391-5487-8
- All the Single Ladies: Unmarried Women and the Rise of an Independent Nation. Simon & Schuster. 1 March 2016. ISBN 978-1-4767-1658-9.
- Good and Mad: The Revolutionary Power of Women's Anger. Simon & Schuster. 2018. ISBN 9781501181795.
