= Big Girls Don't Cry (book) =

2010 book by Rebecca Traister

Big Girls Don't Cry: The Election that Changed Everything for American Women
- First edition cover
- Author: Rebecca Traister
- Language: English
- Subject: U.S. politics
- Genre: Non-fiction
- Publisher: Free Press
- Publication date: September 14, 2010
- Publication place: United States
- Pages: 352
- ISBN: 978-1439150283

Big Girls Don't Cry: The Election that Changed Everything for American Women is a 2010 non-fiction book written by the American journalist Rebecca Traister and published by Free Press. The book focuses on women's contributions to and experiences of the 2008 United States presidential election. Traister places particular focus on four main political figures—Hillary Clinton, Sarah Palin, Michelle Obama, and Elizabeth Edwards—as well as women in the media, including the journalists Katie Couric and Rachel Maddow, and the comedians Tina Fey and Amy Poehler, who portrayed Sarah Palin and Hillary Clinton on Saturday Night Live, respectively. Traister also describes her personal experience of the electoral campaign and her shift from supporting John Edwards to Hillary Clinton.

Traister began writing about the presidential election while working as a political columnist for Salon; her coverage for Salon provided much of the book's content. Traister aimed to write an account of the election through a feminist perspective, centred on the events that she felt were otherwise underreported in the media. The book was generally well received by critics.

== Background ==
Rebecca Traister described the 2008 presidential election as "a completely gripping narrative" during which "everything in America was busted open", but was disappointed by the way it was covered in the mainstream media. Traister felt that some "big stories"—such as Hillary Clinton becoming the first woman to win an American presidential primary—had been underreported, and that many misogynistic and racist remarks made by political commentators had gone unnoticed. In writing the book, Traister wanted to defend the feminist perspective of the election against its Democrat and progressivist critics "who continue to write off concern with these issues". Asked about what she intended for readers to [take away from] the book, Traister said:

I want those people who lived through the 2008 election—and in many cases suffered through it, on one end or the other—to think about the history that we all made and we all witnessed. I really want those of us who were pained by it or who were exhausted by it to understand the way that living through that election changed our country. Because I believe it did.

Traister chose the title Big Girls Don't Cry when it was suggested to her by a friend, before she began writing the book. Traister notes that she thought the title was "the perfect ironic reference to Hillary [Clinton]'s (non-)crying moment in New Hampshire", as well as a reference to her own response of "gulp[ing] out sobs" when Clinton lost the Democratic primary. She said that, after interviewing women who described crying at various moments during the election, "I realized that the title was more prophetic than I knew". Some of Traister's political views expressed in the book contradict those she expressed when she was writing for Salon, such as her support for Clinton and her defense of Michelle Obama in the book; throughout the book she describes the transformations and evolution of her opinions.

== Content ==
Big Girls Don't Cry is divided into twelve chapters, telling a roughly chronological recount of the 2008 election. Interwoven throughout the book are Traister's own experiences and perspective, as well as analysis from other political commentators. She focuses on four key women involved in the election: Hillary Clinton, Sarah Palin, Michelle Obama, and Elizabeth Edwards.

In 2008 Clinton, a Senator and candidate for the Democratic Party presidential nomination, became the first American woman to win a presidential primary. Traister discusses Clinton's political campaign, which did not focus on her gender, and the misogynistic reactions she received from the media and political opponents—on both sides of the aisle, though primarily from the Republican Party. She argues that the Democratic Party's lack of response to the sexism of Clinton's opponents led a large number of liberal female voters to abandon the party, and blames Mark Penn for advising Clinton not to advertise herself as a feminist. Although she originally supported John Edwards' candidacy for the Democratic presidential nomination, she became a strong supporter of Clinton.

Palin was the Republican Party nominee for Vice President and then-Governor of Alaska. Traister criticises Palin's "faux feminism", as she claimed to be a feminist despite running under a party whose policies did not align with feminist ideals. Traister argues that Palin's strong conservatism led Clinton supporters to back Barack Obama rather than John McCain after Clinton's withdrawal from the race. Despite this, Palin was celebrated by Republican women voters; Traister argues that this inspired a wave of feminism which focused on political empowerment but neglected other values such as reproductive rights.

Traister also discusses the wives of men involved in politics: Michelle Obama, the wife of the Democratic presidential nominee Barack Obama, and Elizabeth Edwards, the late wife of John Edwards, another candidate for the Democratic presidential nomination. Traister contrasts the Obamas' relationship with that of Hillary and former President Bill Clinton. She argues that Michelle Obama's candidness led many women voters to feel they had more in common with her than Hillary Clinton. On the other hand, Traister compares Elizabeth Edwards' public image to that of Michelle Obama and Hillary Clinton, and criticizes her for "enabl[ing] her husband's deception" about his extramarital affair.

In addition to female political figures, Traister also discusses women in the media who played influential roles in the election coverage. These women include: Rachel Maddow, whose political commentary led to a surge in her popularity; television journalist Katie Couric, who led a critical interview with Sarah Palin; and Tina Fey and Amy Poehler, who parodied Palin and Clinton, respectively, in several Saturday Night Live skits.

The book is written from a feminist perspective; Traister recounts her own experiences with the women's liberation movement, identifying with neither second-wave nor third-wave feminism. She notes the various responses to the election and candidates from different generations of feminists, and argues that for older feminists the main priority was the election of a female President, while younger women were less inclined to automatically vote for a female candidate. Traister concludes that the 2008 election marked the year that "the women's liberation movement found thrilling new life".

== Reception ==
Big Girls Don't Cry was deemed a New York Times Notable Book of 2010 and the winner of the Ernesta Drinker Ballard Book Prize. The book also received positive reviews from critics. In a review for Foreign Affairs, Walter Russell Mead described Traister as "one of the most powerful voices in a new generation of American feminist writers", while Liesl Schillinger of The New York Times called the book "a passionate, visionary and very personal account" of the 2008 election. Maureen Corrigan of NPR praised the "superb" book, and concluded that "Girls, these days, can not only run for president; they can brilliantly analyze presidential campaigns, too." The Washington Post critic Connie Schultz felt that at times Traister's writing seemed to "alienate every female reader over 40", but wrote that the book was "in its best parts ... a raw and brave memoir". A writer for Kirkus Reviews praised Traister's arguments and described the book as a "nuanced look at how the recent election shaped—and was shaped by—gender". Lynda Obst wrote for The Atlantic that the book served as a satisfying explanation to "mystified" Obama supporters "what the hell all the crying was about" after Clinton conceded from the Democratic primary. While Slate reviewer Hanna Rosin questioned the relevance of some chapters but overall concluded that, "Traister can be clever, caustic, wickedly funny, and as cynical as the next blogger, but it's always clear that in her heart she cares."
