= Elizabeth Sandwith Drinker =

Quaker diarist

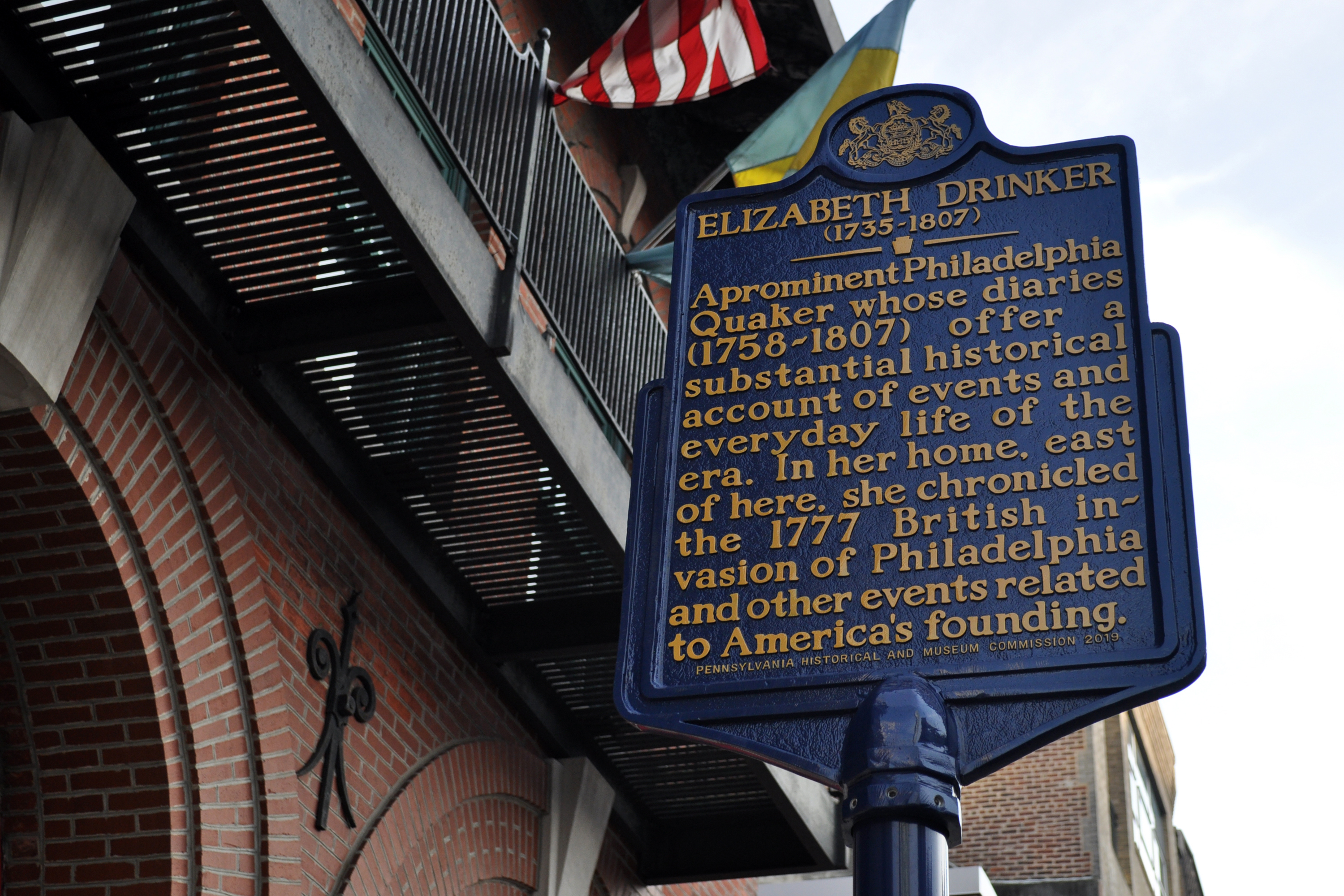
- Elizabeth Sandwith Drinker historical marker at 147 N. 2nd St., Philadelphia PA
- Occupation: Diarist

Elizabeth Sandwith Drinker (c. 1735 – 1807) was a Quaker woman of late 18th century North America who kept a diary from 1758 to 1807. This 2,100 page diary was first published in 1889 and sheds light on daily life in Philadelphia, the Society of Friends, family and gender roles, political issues and the American Revolution, and innovations in medical practices.

== Personal life ==
Elizabeth Drinker was born on February 27, 1735, to William and Sarah Sandwith. A young merchant, Henry Drinker, courted her, and they married on January 13, 1761. Both Elizabeth and Henry were members of the Society of Friends. Elizabeth functioned as a housewife while Henry Drinker was a partner of the James & Drinker shipping and importing firm in Philadelphia. Elizabeth and Henry had five children who all survived to adulthood: Sarah, Ann, William, Henry, and Mary. Her affluence, due to her husband's employment, and her own education allowed her the literacy and leisure time to keep a diary of her life for 50 years.

Elizabeth and Henry tried to remain neutral during the American Revolution, but his lack of support caused Henry to be accused of treason. Continental Congress ordered Henry's arrest in 1777. Elizabeth and Henry frequently wrote to one another while Henry was kept prisoner at Masonic Lodge, as many fellow Quakers were for their pacifist beliefs during the American Revolutionary War. From her journal entries and the 67 letters between them, it is evident that Henry encouraged Elizabeth to do as she saw fit to continue running the house in his absence. The letters suggest that the couple had a companionate marriage, a resembling a partnership more than a patriarchal structure. In order to get through the seven months of Henry's absence, Elizabeth relied on her domestic skills, support from friends and family, and her religious beliefs. Elizabeth, with some other Quaker women, met first with Martha and then George Washington to secure the release of their husbands. Washington declined, but permitted them to visit the prison. Elizabeth visited Henry in April 1778, and they were both permitted to return home.

Elizabeth was the primary caregiver for her children, especially for her son William, who struggled with chronic illness. In addition, Mary Sandwith, Elizabeth's sister, lived with them for most of her life. Elizabeth often depended on servants to run her household. She discussed this in her diary and highlighted the changes in domestic service during her lifetime, including the beginnings of domestic service as a waged occupation for women. Though Henry and Elizabeth had a generally happy marriage, she was often frustrated with how often he left the family for work, as even after the children were adults and they were in their old age, he continued to work as a merchant. Elizabeth Drinker died on November 24, 1807; Henry lived for another two years after.

== The diary ==
Elizabeth Sandwith Drinker kept her diary 1758 to 1807. Its published version is broken down into four parts: Youth and courtship (1755–61), Young wife and mother (1762–75), Middle age in years of crisis (1776–93), and Grandmother (1794–1807). Her diary begins with an emphasis on her youth and social life and ends with a focus on her eventual station as a matriarch of a Quaker household and member of the Quaker upper-class. Her initial entries centered around her relationship with her sister and husband. However, once she became a mother, her entries primarily revolved around her maternal duties. Her entries regarding her husband, and particularly his absences, also shed light on the gender roles within Quaker society, as she was often left in charge of the household and home.

Especially during the 1790s, Drinker also wrote extensively regarding her Federalist views, as she and other women of the time became engaged in politics. She lived during a time of political struggle between the Federalists and the Democratic Republicans. She paid attention to the Pamphlet wars in her entries but mainly focused on Federalist ideas. She expressed opinions regarding the political violence of the time and her thoughts regarding the election process. She also commented on the French Revolution. Her entries regarding Henry's arrest and time in prison, also shed light on the Quakers and their experience of the American Revolutionary War.

In addition to the political and social views in the diary, Drinker described changing medical practices during the 18th century. She chronicled the development of smallpox inoculation and vaccination. She noted, "I wrote to Molly to endeavor to persuade her to have her children vaccinated instead of inoculated, for small pox." She also addressed the spread of Yellow fever. She additionally kept records detailing her own family's health and medical preferences.
