= Henry Drinker =

American lawyer, ethics scholar and musicologist (1880-1965)

Henry Sandwith Drinker
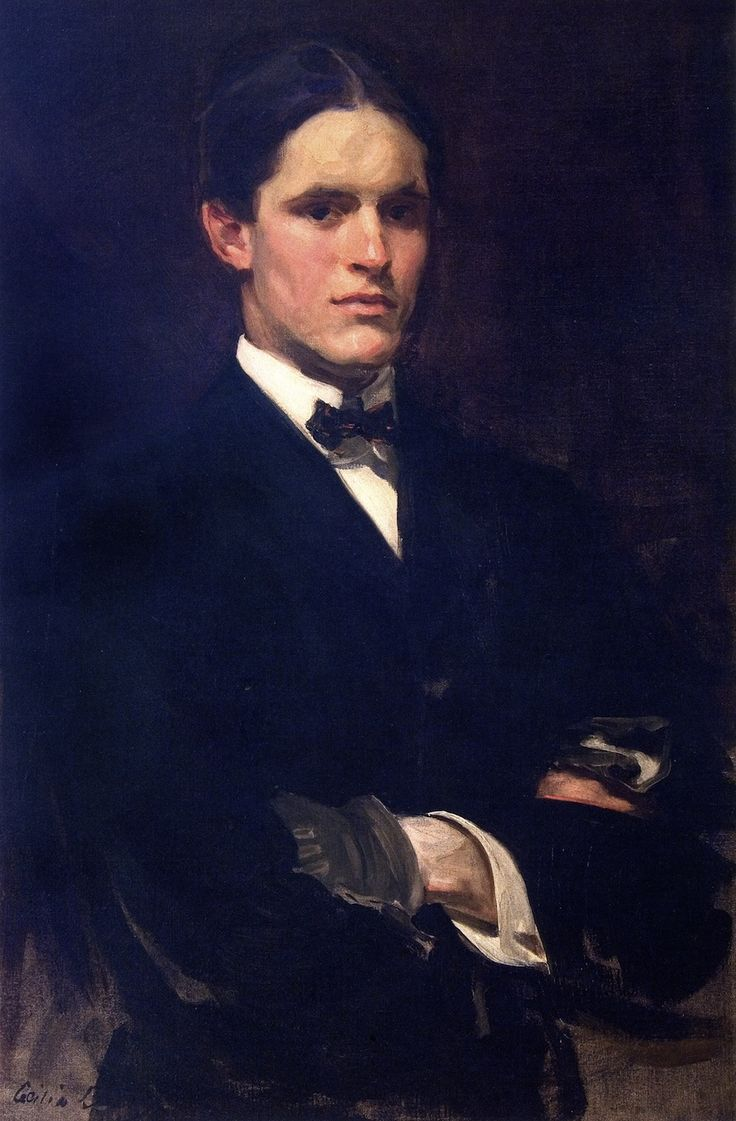
- Portrait of Henry Sandwith Drinker (1901) by Cecilia Beaux
- Born: September 16, 1880; West Chester, Pennsylvania, U.S.
- Died: March 10, 1965 (aged 84)
- Resting place: West Laurel Hill Cemetery, Bala Cynwyd, Pennsylvania, U.S.
- Education: Haverford College; Harvard University; University of Pennsylvania Law School
- Occupations: lawyer, musicologist

Henry Sandwith Drinker (September 15, 1880 – March 10, 1965) was an American lawyer and amateur musicologist. In 1964, the American Bar Association gave Drinker the American Bar Association Medal, stating that Drinker's monumental work Legal Ethics (1953) was "recognized throughout the civilized world as the definitive treatise on this subject."

== Early life and education ==
Drinker was born into a prominent Quaker family in Philadelphia, the son of Henry Sturgis Drinker, a mechanical engineer for the Lehigh Valley Railroad who became president of Lehigh University, and Aimee Ernesta “Etta” Beaux. He had three brothers: Jim; Cecil, a physiologist and dean of the Harvard School of Public Health; and Philip, inventor of the iron lung; and two sisters, Catherine and Ernesta. The painter Cecilia Beaux was his mother's sister.

Drinker graduated from Haverford College in 1900 with an A.B., then earned another A.B. from Harvard University in 1901. He attended University of Pennsylvania Law School and Harvard Law School, earning his LL.B. in 1904 from Penn.

== Legal career ==
Drinker began working for what became Drinker Biddle & Reath in 1904, becoming a partner in 1918. The firm became one of the most prominent in Philadelphia.

Drinker was elected in 1951 to the American Philosophical Society.

As Chair of the ABA Committee on Professional Ethics, Drinker authored what is generally considered the definitive mid-twentieth century American treatise on lawyers' professional norms and standards, Legal Ethics (1953).

In 1949, Drinker delivered an address to the Grolier Club titled "The Lawyers of Anthony Trollope". The Grolier Club published it in a book in 1950, and The Federal Lawyer reprinted it in its January 2008 issue.

=== Posthumous criticism ===
In 1976, Drinker's record was harshly criticized by historian Jerold Auerbach of Wellesley College, who claimed that Drinker personified the elitism of the bar in the early twentieth century. Auerbach quotes Drinker as having referred, in remarks at a 1929 ABA committee meeting addressing standards for Bar admission, to "Russian Jew boys" who came "up out of the gutter" as the subject of a disproportionate number of ethical complaints against lawyers. A solution to the problem of immigrant lawyers who had not absorbed the professional norms of the American legal profession, Drinker argued, would be to require at least two years of college before admission to the Bar. The fairness of Auerbach's criticism was both attacked and defended.

== Music work ==
Though he was a successful lawyer, Drinker spent his spare time playing music, a passionate hobby that was as important to him as his real profession. Apart from active music-making, he devoted himself to the translation of the German text of vocal compositions of great composers into English. Among them are Schubert's songs and the vocal works of Johann Sebastian Bach. From 1912 to 1920, Drinker served as President of the Board of Managers of the Bach Choir of Bethlehem, Pennsylvania.

All of his children had daily music lessons, and the whole family sat down together regularly to sing. They often visited musical events such as concerts, opera performances and music festivals, and were for 25 years subscribers to the Philadelphia Orchestra. In 1928, the Drinkers built a new house that contained a large music room where they regularly organized singing evenings, and sometimes they used the premises of the American Musicological Society for their gatherings. Most well-known were their invitation-only singing parties that involved a dinner prepared by the Drinker household staff with group song and music before and after. Often these evenings involved the accompaniment of musicians invited from prestigious institutions, such as the Philadelphia Orchestra and Curtis Institute.

During World War II, Drinker intervened on behalf of the von Trapp family when they were detained at Ellis Island by visa problems. He sponsored the family, providing them with housing and financial support for their first three years in the United States.

== Personal life, death ==
Henry Drinker married the musician Sophie Drinker (born Sophie Lewis Hutchinson), then moved to Merion, Pennsylvania. The couple had five children together: Sophie, Henry S. III, Cecilia, Ernesta, and Pemberton. He died in 1965 and was interred at West Laurel Hill Cemetery in Bala Cynwyd, Pennsylvania.

== Legacy ==
Drinker's papers are in the University of Pennsylvania Law School archives.

Despite several rounds of renaming and mergers, the law firm he long led continues to bear Drinker's name.

The Drinker House at Haverford College was renamed in his honor in 1961, when it was converted into the music department building and library. In 1974, it was converted to student housing.

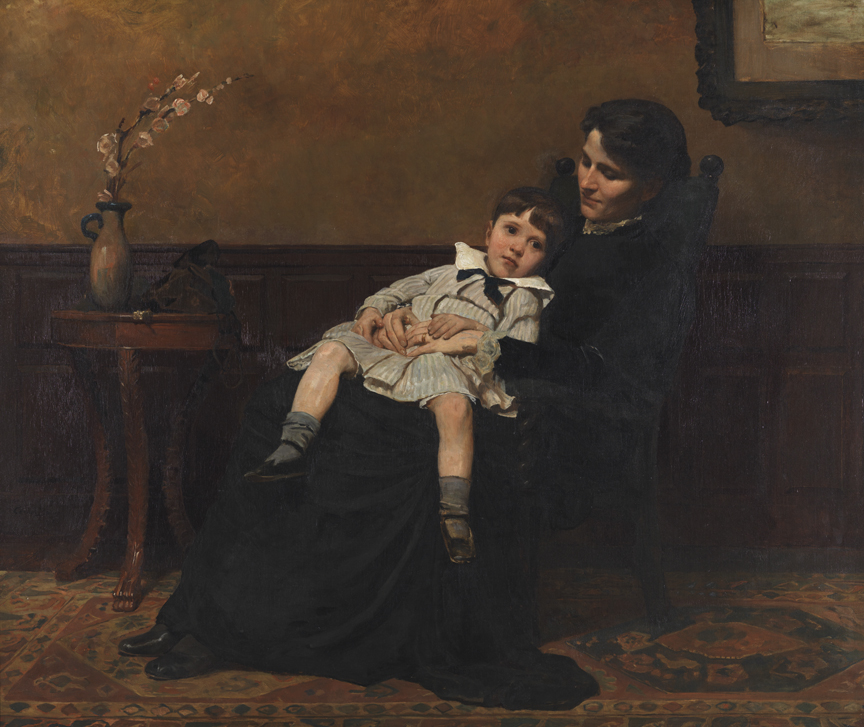
Les derniers jours d' enfance (1883) by Cecilia Beaux, Pennsylvania Academy of the Fine Arts

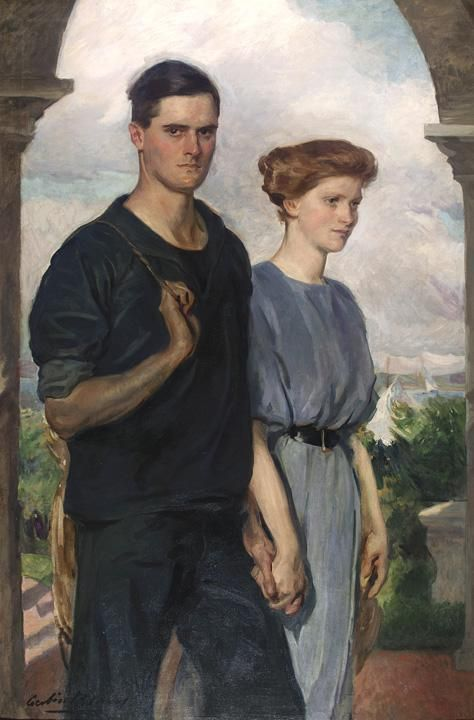
Summer Portraits – Mr. & Mrs. Henry Sandwith Drinker (c.1911), by Cecilia Beaux, private collection
