= Medicare Drug Price Negotiation Program =

United States program for negotiating Medicare drug prices

The Medicare Drug Price Negotiation Program is a United States federal program, administered by the Centers for Medicare & Medicaid Services (CMS), that negotiates lower prices for selected prescription drugs covered under Medicare Part B and Part D. It was created by the 2022 Inflation Reduction Act.

The Inflation Reduction Act repealed a longstanding prohibition, originally enacted in the Medicare Prescription Drug, Improvement, and Modernization Act of 2003, on Medicare's negotiating prescription drug prices. The first negotiated prices, termed "maximum fair prices" (MFPs), took effect on January 1, 2026 for 10 Part D drugs. Prices for an additional 15 drugs, including Ozempic and Wegovy, will take effect in 2027, with 15 further drugs to follow in 2028. From 2029 onward, 20 drugs are to be added each year.

In July 2025, the One Big Beautiful Bill Act expanded the program's orphan drug exclusion to cover drugs with multiple rare-disease designations, delaying or removing future-round candidates such as Keytruda and Opdivo.

The program has been the subject of more than a dozen federal lawsuits by drug companies and industry groups. On May 18, 2026, the Supreme Court of the United States denied certiorari in the first wave of petitions, leaving the program in effect.

== History ==
Medicare Part D, the outpatient prescription drug benefit, was created by the 2003 Medicare Modernization Act. That law barred the Secretary of Health and Human Services from interfering in drug price negotiations between manufacturers, pharmacies, and plan sponsors, a provision commonly called the "non-interference clause".

Over the next two decades, repeated attempts to repeal this restriction failed. The Medicare Prescription Drug Price Negotiation Act was passed by the House of Representatives in 2007 but never became law. In 2021, the Build Back Better Act included similar negotiation proposals, but the bill stalled in the Senate.

In 2022, a scaled-back version of negotiation, the Medicare Drug Price Negotiation Program, was included in the final version of the Inflation Reduction Act.

== Framework ==
=== Drug eligibility ===
To be eligible, a drug must be a single-source brand-name or biological product covered under Medicare Part B or Part D, with no marketed generic or biosimilar competitor. In addition:

- Small-molecule drugs must have been FDA-approved for at least 7 years.
- Biological products must have been FDA-licensed for at least 11 years.

This four-year disparity has been termed the "pill penalty" by the pharmaceutical industry, which has argued that the shorter window for small molecules discourages investment in oral drug development. A 2025 KFF analysis estimated that lengthening the small-molecule window to 11 years would have made ineligible 13 of the 25 drugs selected in the first two cycles, accounting for roughly two-thirds of associated Medicare Part D spending.

=== Manufacturer participation ===
Manufacturer participation in the Negotiation Program is nominally voluntary. A manufacturer that declines to participate must either pay an excise tax that begins at 65% of U.S. sales of the selected drug and rises by 10% each quarter to a maximum of 95%, or withdraw all of its products from coverage under Medicare and Medicaid. In court, the federal government has consistently characterized this arrangement as voluntary, and federal courts have accepted that characterization in rejecting constitutional challenges to the program.

=== 2025 amendments ===
The Trump administration's One Big Beautiful Bill Act (OBBBA), enacted in July 2025, narrowed the pool of drugs the Negotiation Program covers. The original orphan-drug exclusion applied only to drugs approved for a single rare-disease indication; OBBBA expanded it to cover any drug with one or more orphan designations so long as the drug has no non-orphan FDA approvals. The act also restarted the eligibility clock for orphan drugs, providing that the 7- or 11-year countdown begins only when a drug first receives an approval for a non-orphan indication.

The Congressional Budget Office (CBO) estimated that the changes would reduce federal savings by approximately $8.8 billion over 2025-2034.

== Legal challenges ==
Beginning in 2023, pharmaceutical manufacturers and industry groups challenged the Negotiation Program, alleging violations of the First, Fifth, and Eighth Amendments, as well as the nondelegation doctrine. Every federal court to reach the merits upheld the program. The Second and Third Circuits rejected challenges brought by six manufacturers, generally holding that participation in Medicare does not give manufacturers a protected right to sell drugs at particular prices and that participation in the program is voluntary.

On May 18, 2026, the Supreme Court declined to hear appeals from AstraZeneca, Boehringer Ingelheim, Bristol Myers Squibb, Janssen, Novartis, and Novo Nordisk, leaving the appellate rulings in place. The second Donald Trump administration continued to administer and defend the program.

== Effects and reception ==
The Congressional Budget Office estimated in 2022 that the drug-pricing provisions of the IRA, of which the Negotiation Program is the largest single component, would reduce the federal budget deficit by approximately $237 billion over the 2022-2031 period, with the Negotiation Program alone contributing roughly $98.5 billion. The 40 drug products selected across the first three cycles accounted for approximately $125 billion of total Medicare drug spending in 2024, or more than one-third of all Part B and Part D drug spending.

Pharmaceutical manufacturers and industry groups have argued that the program reduces incentives for research and development, particularly for small-molecule drugs that face the shorter 7-year eligibility threshold. A 2024 analysis in Nature Biotechnology projected that the program's effect on research-and-development investment would be small and largely confined to marginally profitable drug development. Subsequent work has documented declines in industry-sponsored post-approval clinical trials for small-molecule oncology drugs relative to biologics following the IRA's passage.

A December 2025 report from the AARP Public Policy Institute projected that average enrollee cost-sharing across the first 10 selected drugs would fall by approximately 50% in 2026 among Part D plans in five states.

== See also ==
- Prescription drug prices in the United States
