= Pharmaceutical Research and Manufacturers of America =

Trade group

- Abbreviation: PhRMA
- Formation: 1958
- Purpose: Trade association Lobbying
- Headquarters: Washington, D.C., U.S.
- Board Chair: Robert M. Davis
- Board Chair Elect: Chris Boerner, Ph.D
- President, CEO: Stephen J. Ubl
- Website: Official
- Formerly called: Pharmaceutical Manufacturers Association

Pharmaceutical Research and Manufacturers of America (PhRMA, pronounced /ˈfɑrmə/) is an American trade association representing leading pharmaceutical and biotechnology companies in the United States. Founded in 1958 and headquartered in Washington, D.C., the organization advocates on behalf of its member companies on public policy issues affecting the biopharmaceutical industry.

PhRMA's activities include lobbying federal and state governments in the United States and in other countries internationally on matters such as prescription drug pricing, intellectual property protections, supporting policies that increase pharmaceutical innovation, and the role of pharmacy benefit managers (PBMs) in the biopharmaceutical supply chain. The organization also sponsors public-facing initiatives related to patient access, medication affordability, and industry practices.

PhRMA has played a prominent role in major U.S. health care policy debates, including the creation of Medicare Part D, the Affordable Care Act, and more recent legislation concerning drug pricing. The organization has argued that policies supporting strong intellectual property protections and market-based pricing are important for sustaining investment in pharmaceutical research and development. Its positions, particularly on pricing and patent protections, have drawn criticism from policymakers and advocacy groups who argue that PhRMA's positions reflect industry interests over patient affordability.

== History ==
=== Predecessor organizations ===
PhRMA traces its roots to two earlier pharmaceutical industry organizations: the American Pharmaceutical Manufacturers Association (APMA) and the American Drug Manufacturers Association (ADMA). The APMA, originally named the American Association of Pharmaceutical Chemists, was founded in 1906, and by 1912 had distributed a formal code of conduct to its members emphasizing quality standards and honesty in manufacturing. The ADMA was organized in 1907, with its first meeting held in New York in February of that year. By 1924, the two organizations had established a joint committee to work with the Bureau of Chemistry, the predecessor to the Food and Drug Administration, on pharmaceutical product quality issues. The APMA noted rising costs for small shipments during its 1954 Eastern section conference, and called on shipment companies to work together to lower prices for manufacturers. In 1958, the APMA and ADMA merged to form the Pharmaceutical Manufacturers Association (PMA), which was incorporated in Delaware by April of that year.

The PMA was established during a period of significant regulatory change for the pharmaceutical industry. By the late 1950s, the organization represented 140 drug companies, that represented over 90% of the U.S. pharmaceutical market share.

=== 1950s–60s: Kefauver hearings and drug safety ===
Beginning in 1959, Senator Estes Kefauver, the Chairman of the U.S. Senate Antitrust Subcommittee, led a Senate investigation into drug pricing that culminated in proposed sweeping reforms to the industry. Kefauver's proposed changes would have included, among other priorities, reduced market exclusivity terms for new medications and restricted patents to drugs that demonstrated a meaningfully greater therapeutic benefit over existing medicines.

PMA members voted to endorse roughly two-thirds of the legislation, supporting new FDA authority over quality controls and manufacturing inspections, but opposed provisions that would have restricted pharmaceutical advertising and compulsory licensing of patented medicines. The PMA during this time cited its research and development work as a large advantage in the Cold War against the Soviet Union to push for the support of research and development priorities. The final legislation was significantly shaped by the Thalidomide scandal in Europe, which galvanized public support for the stronger drug safety requirements the PMA had already endorsed. This reaction led directly to the efficacy provisions of the Kefauver-Harris Amendment of 1962, provisions that had originally been a secondary element of Kefauver's broader reform agenda, whose more sweeping price control measures ultimately failed to pass.

=== 1970s–80s: "Drug lag" debate ===
In the years following the Kefauver-Harris Amendment's passage, the PMA became a leading voice in the debate over the "drug lag", an argument that the FDA's increasingly stringent approval process was causing American patients to wait significantly longer than their European counterparts for new medicines. The PMA contended that regulatory burdens were discouraging investment in pharmaceutical research and development, noting in a pamphlet in the late 1960s that drug development was so complex and costly that "Only Industry Can Do the Job" and that the elongated FDA review time was discouraging R&D investment. The "drug lag" debate contributed to the passage of the Drug Price Competition and Patent Term Restoration Act in 1984, commonly known as the Hatch-Waxman Act. The law established the modern pathway for generic drug approval while allowing brand-name manufacturers to restore a portion of the patent term lost during FDA review, up to five years and subject to statutory limits. Both the PMA and the Generic Pharmaceutical Industry Association agreed to a deal supporting the legislation.

=== 1990s: Rebranding to PhRMA ===
President Bill Clinton's proposed health care plan in 1993 proposed sweeping reforms to the American health care system, including the creation of large purchasing cooperatives that the pharmaceutical industry feared would lead to government-imposed price controls on prescription medicines that would threaten their ability to develop new medications. The proposal galvanized the PMA and its member companies, who mounted an aggressive lobbying campaign against the legislation alongside other health care industry groups.

The PMA expressed support for the Prescription Drug User Fee Act in 1992 and negotiated its terms directly with the FDA. As originally enacted, the law established a system of industry fees to fund FDA human drug review, conditioned on the fees supplementing rather than replacing Congressional appropriations and be dedicated solely to reducing application review times. A report the next year noted that FDA review processing times had significantly increased, which the PMA called "a good-faith effort on the part of the F.D.A."

In May 1994, PMA renamed itself the Pharmaceutical Research and Manufacturers of America (PhRMA), reflecting the organization's more deliberate repositioning around research and innovation rather than manufacturing, and marked the culmination of a decades-long shift in how the pharmaceutical industry presented itself publicly. The new PhRMA Board Chairman at the time and the CEO of Pfizer, Sheldon Gilgore, said, "We want the public to realize that it is this industry that discovers drugs," pushing back on the idea that they only manufactured medicines that had been discovered elsewhere.

=== 2000s–10s: Medicare Part D and the Affordable Care Act ===
Billy Tauzin, the Louisiana congressman who championed the Medicare Modernization Act, shakes hands with President George W. Bush. Tauzin subsequently became president of PhRMA in 2004 and later negotiated the organization's conditional support for the Affordable Care Act in 2009.

By the late 1990s, PhRMA had shifted its position on Medicare prescription drug coverage, publicly supporting a drug benefit as part of an updated Medicare program structured around private-sector health plans rather than direct government administration. The Medicare Prescription Drug, Improvement, and Modernization Act, signed by President George W. Bush on December 8, 2003, established Medicare Part D, the first major expansion of Medicare in the program's history to cover outpatient prescription drugs. A key provision of the final law, which PhRMA strongly supported, was a "non-interference" clause that prohibited Medicare from directly negotiating with manufacturers. Instead, that role fell to the private plans delivering the benefit, which negotiated prices and rebates with manufacturers directly. Former Louisiana Congressman Billy Tauzin, who had helped write the law, became President of PhRMA in 2004 after his retirement from Congress.

In a significant departure from its opposition to the Clinton health care plan in 1994, PhRMA took a collaborative approach to the Obama administration's health care reform efforts in 2009. In June of that year, PhRMA reached a deal with the White House and Senate Finance Committee Chairman Max Baucus, agreeing to contribute $80 billion in cost-cutting measures over ten years, including $30 billion directed toward closing the Medicare Part D "donut hole" coverage gap, in exchange for assurances that the final legislation would not include Medicare drug price negotiation or drug reimportation from other first world countries.

The Affordable Care Act was signed into law by President Barack Obama in March 2010, without the price negotiation or reimportation provisions PhRMA had stridently opposed. When President Trump later moved to repeal the law, PhRMA stayed publicly neutral.

=== 2020s: Inflation Reduction Act and Most Favored Nation Pricing reactions ===
The Inflation Reduction Act, signed by President Joe Biden in August 2022, authorized Medicare to negotiate prescription drug prices directly with manufacturers for the first time. PhRMA opposed the legislation, arguing that government price-setting would discourage investment in pharmaceutical research and development, and filed legal challenges contending that the law's negotiation provisions and associated excise tax were unconstitutional. PhRMA's lawsuit was dismissed in Texas in 2025, although other legal challenges to the law are still pending as of 2026.

In May 2025, President Donald Trump signed an executive order implementing Most Favored Nation Drug Pricing, directing federal agencies to tie American drug prices to the lowest prices paid by other developed nations. PhRMA expressed support for the administration's broader goal of pressuring foreign governments to pay more for innovative medicines, while arguing that pharmacy benefit managers, health insurers, and hospitals were the primary driver of high costs for American patients. Stephen J. Ubl, PhRMA's President, particularly opposed foreign price-setting schemes that were being discussed by the administration, noting, "Importing foreign prices from socialist countries would be a bad deal for American patients and workers." By December 2025, a number of PhRMA member companies, including Pfizer, Merck, and Sanofi, had reached individual agreements with the Trump administration to offer discounted prices through TrumpRx, the administration's direct-to-consumer drug purchasing platform. PhRMA has also launched its own website, AmericasMedicines.com to allow companies to offer cheaper prices direct to consumers.

== Organization ==
=== Leadership ===
PhRMA is led by a President and a Board of Directors drawn from member companies. The president and CEO is responsible for the day-to-day operations of the organization and its advocacy activities. As of 2026, Robert M. Davis, CEO of Merck & Co. serves as chair of the PhRMA Board of Directors. Stephen J. Ubl has served as President and CEO of PhRMA since 2015. Ubl is leaving his role in November 2026, and former congressional leader Eric Cantor was announced as PhRMA’s incoming president and chief executive officer, succeeding him.

Some previous notable leadership includes: John J. Castellani, formerly head of the Business Roundtable, a U.S. advocacy and lobbying group, Billy Tauzin, a former Republican congressman from Louisiana, and John J. Horan, former CEO and chairman of Merck & Co.

=== Funding and offices ===
PhRMA is funded primarily through membership dues paid by its member companies. In 2024, PhRMA collected $507 million in membership dues and $521 million in total revenue. The organization does not publicly disclose its membership dues structure or how much individual member companies pay. PhRMA's revenue historically has fluctuated significantly in response to the political environment: the organization collected $350 million in 2009 during the debate over the Affordable Care Act, shrank to around $205 million annually in subsequent years, and then rose again to $271 million in 2016 amid bipartisan scrutiny around drug pricing. In 2017, PhRMA had a revenue of $455 million, of which it spent $128 million on lobbying activities.

PhRMA maintains its headquarters in Washington, D.C. and has regional offices throughout the United States. It also has international offices in both Tokyo and Beijing.

=== Membership ===
PhRMA lists its membership qualifications as a company or division that operates in the U.S. that is engaged in research and development (R&D), manufacturing, and marketing of pharmaceutical or biological medicines. In 2017, the company announced a new set of membership criteria that required member companies to invest at least 10 percent of their global sales and a minimum spend of at least $200 million annually into R&D, measured over a three-year period.

In October 2015, PhRMA published a post distinguishing its membership from Valeant Pharmaceuticals, a non-member, whose strategy PhRMA called "more reflective of a hedge fund than an innovative biopharmaceutical company" in part due to its low spending on research and development. In February 2017, PhRMA criticized member company Marathon Pharmaceuticals over its $89,000 price for a Duchenne muscular dystrophy treatment. Marathon resigned that April during a review of the organization's membership criteria.

Current member companies include Alkermes, Amgen, Astellas Pharma, AstraZeneca, Bayer, Biogen, BioMarin Pharmaceutical, Boehringer Ingelheim, Bristol Myers Squibb, CSL Behring, Daiichi Sankyo, Eisai, Eli Lilly and Company, EMD Serono, Genentech, Genmab, Gilead Sciences, GSK plc, Incyte, Ipsen, Johnson & Johnson, Kyowa Kirin, Lundbeck, Merck & Co., Neurocrine Biosciences, Novartis, Novo Nordisk, Otsuka Pharmaceutical, Pfizer, Sanofi, Stemline Therapeutics (a Menarini Group company), Sumitomo Pharma America, Takeda Pharmaceutical Company, and UCB.

== Activities and programs ==
=== Issues and advocacy ===
PhRMA advocates before Congress and federal agencies on issues including prescription drug pricing, intellectual property protections, and criticism of the role of pharmacy benefit managers (PBMs) as "middlemen" in the biopharmaceutical supply chain. In 2025, PhRMA spent $37.9 million on lobbying the federal government directly and employed 201 federal lobbyists. The organization has regularly argued that strong patent protections and pricing flexibility are necessary to sustain investment in pharmaceutical research and development, and that government price-setting would discourage long-term clinical research. In 2016, the organization introduced a "Let's Talk About Cost" website, which reinforced its argument about PBMs.

PhRMA runs several large ad campaigns across the Washington, D.C. media market that target lawmakers and influencers in the area. By June 2017, PhRMA had spent $20 million on its "Go Boldly" campaign, which featured researchers for specific diseases and patients that had benefitted from their cures, and marked a shift away from focusing on the drug price debate in public conversation.

In recent years, PhRMA has made pharmacy benefit manager (PBM) reform a central lobbying priority. The organization argues that PBMs act as intermediaries that drive up out-of-pocket costs for patients and make health care unaffordable. It has run several ad campaigns around the issue and supports groups which criticize PBM practices that drive up costs for patients, and has donated to several groups which advocate for PBM reform. In 2026, legislation that made significant structural changes to how PBMs operate was passed, and PhRMA encouraged lawmakers to consider additional reforms.

PhRMA has advocated for changes to the 340B Drug Pricing Program, a federal initiative that requires pharmaceutical manufacturers to provide outpatient medicines to certain safety-net hospitals and clinics at discounted rates. The organization argues that the program has expanded beyond its original intent and that hospitals are using it to generate revenue rather than pass savings on to low-income patients. PhRMA has also weighed in on the Trump administration's Most Favored Nation Drug Pricing proposal, which would tie American drug prices to the lowest prices paid by other developed nations.

=== Programs ===
The company operates an annual event called the PhRMA Forum, where the industry touts its role in identifying cures and federal government leaders like FDA commissioner Marty Makary and Centers for Medicare and Medicaid Services administrator Mehmet Oz appeared in 2026. PhRMA maintains a code for pharmaceutical companies' marketing interactions with healthcare professionals. In 2008, the organization revised the code to prohibit non-educational promotional gifts, such as mugs, for healthcare providers and their staffs.

The Partnership for Prescription Assistance connected patients in need with information on low-cost and free prescription medications from member companies. In 2019, PhRMA replaced it with the Medicine Assistance Tool, a search engine for patient assistance programs, which was in turn superseded by AmericasMedicines.com in 2026, a website that allows patients to bypass pharmacy benefit managers and lets companies offer cheaper prices direct to consumers.

SMARxT Disposal, a joint initiative launched in 2007 with the U.S. Fish and Wildlife Service and the American Pharmacists Association that used to encourage consumers to properly dispose of unused medicines to reduce harm to the environment. The organization has also advocated abroad in South Africa regarding pharmaceutical drug intellectual property rules.

== Criticism ==
Critics have argued that PhRMA's advocacy has prioritized industry profits over patient affordability, pointing in particular to its longstanding opposition to allowing Medicare to negotiate prescription drug prices directly with manufacturers and its legal challenge to the pricing provisions of the Inflation Reduction Act. At the state level, the organization has lobbied to prevent price limits and greater price transparency for medications.

PhRMA has also been criticized for past donations to advocacy groups: in 2017, PhRMA gave over $2 million to patient advocacy groups, particularly those based around rare disease conditions, and questioned the conflict of interest implications of the donations. PhRMA contributed $34.5 million since 2010 to the American Action Network (AAN), a conservative advocacy group aligned with House Republican leadership, between 2010 and 2023. In 2022, PhRMA contributed $7.5 million to the organization.

During the COVID-19 pandemic, PhRMA initially opposed a proposed World Trade Organization waiver of intellectual property protections for COVID-19 vaccines that supporters argued would have reduced costs for low-income countries. PhRMA argued that intellectual property protections were not the primary barrier to vaccine access and that supply chain bottlenecks and distribution challenges were the real obstacles. When the Biden administration announced its support for the waiver in May 2021, PhRMA President and CEO Stephen J. Ubl said the decision would "undermine our global response to the pandemic and compromise safety" and in a statement, the organization described the move as a "political stunt."

== See also ==
- Biotechnology Innovation Organization (BIO)
- Association of the British Pharmaceutical Industry
- Ethics in pharmaceutical sales
- European Federation of Pharmaceutical Industries and Associations (EFPIA)
- Generic Pharmaceutical Association
- International Federation of Pharmaceutical Manufacturers Associations (IFPMA)
- International Intellectual Property Alliance (IIPA)
- Japan Pharmaceutical Manufacturers Association
- Pharmaceutical Inspection Convention and Pharmaceutical Inspection Co-operation Scheme
- Pharmaceutical marketing
- Portuguese Pharmaceutical Industry Association
