= Thomas Scully =

Thomas Scully may refer to:

== Sportspeople ==
- Tom Scully (cyclist) (born 1990), track cyclist from New Zealand
- Tom Scully (football manager) (1930–2020), Irish manager of Offaly
- Tom Scully (born 1991), Australian rules footballer
- Tom Scully (English footballer) (born 1999), English footballer

== Others ==
- Thomas A. Scully (born 1957), American healthcare administrator
- Thomas J. Scully (1864–1921), American politician
- Tom Scully (Neighbours), a fictional character in Neighbours
