= Prescription drug prices in the United States =

Overview of the cost of medicines in the United States

Prescription drug prices in the United States are among the highest in the world, both in total spending and per capita costs. In 2023, the U.S. spent over $600 billion on prescription medications—more than any other country on a per-person basis.

Despite this high level of spending, affordability remains a major issue: nearly one in four Americans report difficulty affording their medications, and about 30% say they have skipped or rationed doses due to cost. These outcomes reflect complex factors including patent protections, lack of price negotiation for public insurance programs, limited generic competition, and opaque pricing practices throughout the supply chain.

Unlike many peer nations, the U.S. does not impose direct price controls or rely on centralized bargaining for most drugs. Instead, prices are set through negotiations between drug manufacturers and private insurers or pharmacy benefit managers (PBMs), often resulting in significant price variation and limited transparency.

Critics argue that high drug prices are not only an economic burden but also a public health threat—particularly for patients with chronic conditions like diabetes or cancer. In response, recent policy developments such as the Inflation Reduction Act of 2022 have introduced limited federal drug price negotiation, and other proposals like external reference pricing and patent reform continue to be debated.

== History ==
Pharmaceutical drugs are the only major health care service in which the producer is able to set prices with little constraint, according to Peter Bach from the Health Outcomes Research Group, Memorial Sloan Kettering Cancer Center, and Steven Pearson from the Institute for Clinical and Economic Review, Boston. As of 2004, prices of brand name drugs were significantly higher in the United States than in Canada, India, the UK and other countries, nearly all of which have price controls, while prices for generic drugs tended to be higher in Canada.

In 2003, a Republican-majority Congress created Medicare Part D with the Medicare Prescription Drug, Improvement, and Modernization Act, which prevented Medicare, the country's largest single-payer health care system, from negotiating drug prices. In effect, drug manufacturers in the US were allowed to set their own prices resulting in the unregulated pricing variation for prescription drugs. However, the government does employ drug pricing strategies for other smaller government health programs like the Veterans Health Administration, the Department of Defense, the 340B Drug Pricing Program (1992), and Medicaid.

In 2005, the Government Accountability Office (GAO) examined the change in US drug retail prices from January 2000 through December 2004 and found the average usual and customary (U&C) prices for a 30-day supply of 96 drugs frequently used by people enrolled in BlueCross BlueShield Federal Employee Programs had increased 24.5%. The average U&C prices for brand prescription drugs increased three times as much as the average for generic drug.

In 2007, the AARP published a series of studies showing that prescription drug prices have been rising significantly faster than general inflation. The American Enterprise Institute, a conservative think tank, criticized the methodology as overstating drug price inflation.

In 2010, the Patient Protection and Affordable Care Act, commonly known as Obamacare or the Affordable Care Act, was passed with a goal to increase the number of people who had health insurance and reduce the impact that individual healthcare spending had on households, especially since many Americans had lost their health insurance coverage in the Great Recession. Of its many provisions, two aim to reduce the burden of prescription drugs, both relating to the Medicare Part D coverage gap. Under 2016 Medicare coverage, people paid the deductible until they reached the limit of $3,310. They then entered the coverage gap where they paid about half the total cost for the drug. Once the yearly out-of-pocket expenses reached $4,850, catastrophic coverage phase begins and the person only pays a very small amount for continued medication. In 2010, the first provision, enacted immediately, was a one-year, $250 rebate to those people in the coverage gap to help pay for their medication. The second provision, enacted in January 2011, created a 50% discount on brand-name prescription drugs for seniors within the coverage gap. Subsidies were to be provided until 2020, when the coverage gap was closed as of January 1, 2020.

A December 2015 New York Times editorial opined that "drug prices have been pushed to astronomical heights for no reason other than the desire of drug makers to maximize profits", pointing in particular to strategies by Turing Pharmaceuticals and Valeant Pharmaceuticals for rights to make and sell generic drugs which had administrative exclusivity and then raise the prices dramatically, which were widely condemned in- and outside the pharmaceutical industry. In response, the Department of Health and Human Services and both houses of Congress held a public meeting and hearings respectively to investigate price gouging. In April 2017, Maryland attempted to become the first state to grant the state attorney general the authority to sue drug companies for dramatically increasing drug prices. In April 2018, a divided panel of the United States Court of Appeals for the Fourth Circuit found that the Maryland law violated the Dormant Commerce Clause of the United States Constitution.

Examples of affected medications include epinephrine auto-injectors and insulin. Between 2011 and 2016, Mylan was the only vendor on the market and raised the price of EpiPen by almost 400%, and consumers who were forced to pay the cash prices paid reported amounts of $600 or more for a two-pack of EpiPen auto-injectors. Due to public outcry and demand, Mylan and Teva Pharmaceuticals later announced their releases of generics for EpiPen. However, prices are still high for patients who need to pay cash price. The cash price of generic epinephrine still averages around $350 for a two-pack of auto-injectors, and if a patient's insurance does not cover generic epinephrine, they may need their primary physician to submit an appeal letter to their insurance on their behalf.

A February 2019 poll found 86% of Americans in favor of allowing Medicare to negotiate drug prices. A similar survey published in June 2021 found support at 81%, including 67% of Republicans and 97% of Democrats.

Twice, a Democrat-controlled House of Representatives passed a repeal of the negotiation ban, but the bill was killed in a Republican-controlled Senate: the Medicare Prescription Drug Price Negotiation Act of 2007, and the 2019 Elijah Cummings Lower Drug Costs Now Act. The Elijah Cummings Lower Drug Costs Now Act was reintroduced in 2021, with Democrats in control of the House, Senate, and Presidency. President Biden supports a repeal of the negotiation ban, but did not include it in his American Families Plan, leading other Democrats to push for it to be added.

In July 2020, President Donald Trump signed four executive orders designed to reduce drug costs. One order permitted certain medications be imported in from Canada and another order changed the way how discounts for prescription drugs can be negotiated for Medicare patients. The most radical order mandated Medicare to sell certain medications at the same price in foreign countries. However, this order did not go into effect. Health policy experts claimed that they will have little or no impact on easing prescription drug costs for patients as they require implementation from the Department of Health and Human Services and that is very likely that lawsuits would be filed to stop the order.

The Inflation Reduction Act of 2022 allows the United States Department of Health and Human Services to negotiate the prices of select prescription drugs offered through Medicare Part D beginning in 2026 and Medicare Part B beginning in 2028. In August 2024, the prices of the first ten drugs negotiated under the provisions of the act and offered through Medicare Part D were announced.

President Joe Biden signed executive orders mandating a maximum price of life-saving pharmaceutical drugs like insulin and offering subsidies on the price of drugs. These price caps were reversed by Donald Trump in 2025. The prices set by the pharmaceutical industry in the US are still partially regulated by the Inflation Reduction Act.

On May 12, 2025, Trump signed an Executive Order titled "Delivering Most-Favored-Nation Prescription Drug Pricing to American Patients". He stated that the policy would reduce prescription drug prices significantly and end the U.S. "subsidizing the health care of foreign countries." He claimed prices could fall by 30% to 80% or even more. The order directs the Department of Health and Human Services to communicate price targets to pharmaceutical manufacturers and, if necessary, pursue rulemaking to impose MFN pricing across the U.S. healthcare system, including commercial markets, Medicare, and Medicaid. It also instructs the Department of Commerce, along with the U.S. Trade Representative, to take action against other nations that Trump claims are pursuing unfair practices to keep down drug prices. A different EO, which Trump signed in April 2025, directed the Food and Drug Administration to open up a re-importation process to bring drugs from Canada to the United States. This new EO directs the FDA to expand the reimportation program to other nations.

== Drug expenditures ==
Spending on pharmaceuticals includes expenses on prescription medicines and over-the-counter products, excluding drugs consumed in hospitals. While often discussed alongside drug prices, pharmaceutical spending is a distinct measure.

In 1960, pharmaceutical spending made up 11.5% of U.S. healthcare costs, dropped to 5.5% by 1980, and then rose back to about 10.4% in 2000. Between 2000 and 2013, it generally ranged from 10% to 12%.

In 2010, prescription drugs accounted for 10% of the $2.6 trillion U.S. healthcare spending, making it the third largest expense after hospital and physician services.

As of 2013, U.S. pharmaceutical spending (excluding hospital drugs) was $1,034 per capita, one of the highest among OECD countries. Data from 2006 showed that 19.1% of Americans faced a financial burden from healthcare costs, spending more than 10% of their income.

In 2003, 9.5% of Medicare beneficiaries had no prescription drug costs, 61.6% spent up to $2,083 annually, and 28.9% spent more than $2,084. Low-income families tended to pay more, with 18.9% spending over $4,724 per year on prescriptions.

Specialty drugs treat complex conditions such as cancers, autoimmune diseases, HIV, and hepatitis C. They are typically expensive, complex, or require special handling. The number of specialty drugs grew from 10 in 1990 to 300 by 2015, with over 700 more in development. Their costs have risen faster than inflation for many years. In 2015, 1–2% of the U.S. population used specialty drugs, which accounted for 38% of drug spending.

To manage costs, Medicare Advantage plans can now use step therapy and prior authorization, common in commercial insurance, to control specialty drug spending. Cost-effectiveness analysis can help assess the value of specialty drugs despite their high prices, as they often provide significant health benefits.

Conducting cost-effectiveness analyses may be desirable to convey the value of a medication relative to a previous standard of care. Even if a new therapy is expensive, its incremental cost-effectiveness may be within a willingness-to-pay threshold, as specialty drugs, though more expensive, often are also associated with the greatest gains in QALYs.

=== Specialty pharmaceuticals in the US ===
Prescription drugs known as "specialty" drugs have become integral to the treatment of certain complex diseases including certain cancers and autoimmune diseases. Additionally, some notoriously treatment-resistant infectious diseases such as HIV and hepatitis C have now become manageable (and the latter curable) using so-called specialty pharmaceuticals. Specialty pharmaceuticals are generally classified as such by possessing one or more of the following characteristics: high cost, high complexity, or high touch (i.e. requiring special monitoring, follow-up, or administration technique or assistance). The number of specialty pharmaceuticals has increased dramatically since 1990 when only ten were available; by 2015, 300 specialty products were available with more than 700 in development. The high costs of specialty pharmaceuticals, in addition to the generally high costs of prescription drugs in the United States, have generated a great deal of debate. It is becoming increasingly difficult, at both the individual and societal level, to afford to pay for such medications, as the use of specialty pharmaceuticals continues to increase along with their cost, which had, through 2015, risen faster than inflation for many consecutive years (AARP 2015). In 2015, 1-2% of the US population used specialty drugs, but these drugs represented 38% of drug expenditures for that year. A path forward must be found that provides specialty drugs to those who need them in an affordable, sustainable manner. A recent policy change by the Centers for Medicare and Medicaid Services will allow Medicare Advantage Plans to utilize formulary management tools used in commercial plans, such as step therapy requirements, in order to manage drug costs, including specialty pharmaceuticals. Chambers et al. may have identified one path to identifying the value of Specialty Pharmaceuticals using cost-effectiveness analysis:

Conducting cost-effectiveness analyses may be desirable to convey the value of a medication relative to a previous standard of care. Even if a new therapy is expensive, its incremental cost-effectiveness may be within a willingness-to-pay threshold, as specialty drugs, though more expensive, often are also associated with the greatest gains in QALYs.

== The most expensive pharmaceuticals in the US ==
As of October 2025, the most expensive FDA-approved medications per daily dose are primarily for rare diseases and chronic conditions requiring ongoing treatment. Here are the top examples:

Drug	Condition	Annual Cost	Daily Cost Estimate	Manufacturer
Zokinvy	Hutchinson-Gilford progeria syndrome	$1.2 million	~$3,300	Eiger BioPharmaceuticals
Myalept	Leptin deficiency (lipodystrophy)	$700,000	~$1,900	Aegerion Pharmaceuticals
Ravicti	Urea cycle disorders	$700,000	~$1,900	Horizon Therapeutics
Brineura	Neuronal ceroid lipofuscinosis type 2 (CLN2)	$763,000	~$2,100	BioMarin Pharmaceutical
Folotyn	Peripheral T-cell lymphoma	$1.01 million	~$2,800	Allos Therapeutics

== Effects ==
High prices for vital drugs often have deleterious effects for people who have low income.

In 2006, data from the Medical Expenditure Panel Survey was analyzed to determine the costs of healthcare for American households. It showed that 19.1% of Americans spent more than 10% of their income on healthcare related expenses. Those Americans were considered to have a financial burden due to their healthcare spending. One example is from a study done in 2018 from the American Diabetes Association that stated that the cost of insulin devices at a pharmacy can be almost $200 less than at the listed prices by analogs. A November 2020 study by the West Health Policy Center stated that more than 1.1 million senior citizens in the U.S. Medicare program are expected to die prematurely over the next decade because they will be unable to afford their prescription medications, requiring an additional $17.7 billion to be spent annually on avoidable medical costs due to health complications. The high cost of prescription drugs has required many Americans to use cost-cutting measures and has also led to reformed healthcare legislation.

=== Prescription non-compliance and health effects ===
Another common way that people saved money was to skip or reduce dosages or fail to fill a prescription entirely due to cost restrictions.

One study reported that U.S. consumers pay prescription drug prices anywhere from 4 to 10 times more than other countries, even if they are more advanced or industrialized, and that prescription drug prices have increased twice as much as the inflation rate over the last 12 years. A quarter of Americans taking prescription drugs said in June 2015, they had not filled a prescription in the past 12 months due to cost, and 18 percent reported they "cut pills in half or skipped doses" according to a Kaiser Family Foundation survey. A 2015 survey by the National Center for Health Statistics found that 8% of Americans did not take their medications as prescribed to save money. Similar studies, done ten years prior, found numbers very similar to the 2015 numbers from the Kaiser Family Foundation survey. In 2007, it was estimated that 23.1% of Americans (51 million) had not adhered to their prescription instructions due to the cost of prescription drugs. This is compared to only 8% of Canadians who skipped doses or failed to fill a prescription in the same year because of the cost of prescription medications. The number of Americans who reported cost-related non-adherence to their prescriptions was more than double the number of Canadians. The factors that contributed to whether or not a person was more likely to not follow their prescribed medication instructions were age, the number of checkups with a physician, ongoing health problems, income, and insurance coverage. For example, adults between the ages of 18 and 35 were more likely to skip doses or fail to fill a prescription than those 75 years of age or older. Those with fewer visits to a physician and those with chronic illnesses or disabilities were also more likely to report noncompliance. The reason for those with ongoing illness or disabilities to skip doses is likely due to the increased complexity and the higher prices of the drugs needed. Income and insurance coverage were also major factors determining whether or not a patient would take their medication in the correct doses for the correct duration of time. Those who lacked insurance coverage or were in low-income brackets had very high rates of non-compliance with their medication, even though the United States has drug coverage policies for those with low incomes. Those whose healthcare spending is more than 10% of their income and causes a financial burden to the patient, are considered uninsured, whether they actually have health insurance or not.

One way to examine the potential impact of high drug prices on health outcomes is to look at the effects of having prescription drug insurance and subsequent hospitalizations. Studies have linked obtaining prescription insurance plans to fewer hospitalizations and lower healthcare costs. For example, for Medicare beneficiaries between 2002 and 2010, obtaining prescription drug insurance through Medicare Part D was associated with an 8% decrease in the number of hospital admissions, a 7% decrease in Medicare expenditures, and a 12% decrease in total resource use.

=== Prescriptions from other countries ===
The Washington Post wrote in 2003 that "U.S. Customs estimated 10 million U.S. citizens brought in medications at land borders each year. An additional 2 million packages of pharmaceuticals arrive annually by international mail from Thailand, India, South Africa and other points". Prescription drugs also entered the country in large quantities through Canada because of the price differential of prescription drugs in the two countries. In 2004, it was estimated that Americans purchased more than $1 billion in US dollars in brand-name drugs per year from Canadian pharmacies to save money. The United States has some of the highest prices for specialty drugs compared to other developed countries. Within the year of 2014, the cost of prescriptions had increased by at least 11.4% and 58% within the last eight years. The average cost for a month supply of brand-name drugs can run up to a couple of hundred US dollars, whereas in Canada and Great Britain the same medication could cost up to $40 US dollars. In most cases, patients pay less for more.

In some cases, U.S. insurance companies will pay consumers of high-cost drugs to personally travel to Mexico to buy the same drugs at a much lower cost there.

== Reasons for high prices ==
=== Variability and non-transparency ===
The price of a pharmaceutical drug can depend on many factors: list price, wholesale price, average wholesale price (pharmaceuticals), rebates, supplemental rebates, markups from hospitals, markups for physicians, drug price for inpatients versus outpatients, formulary (pharmacy) tiers, mail order price, biosimilar prices, "patent expirations, compounds, samples, and many other ways that end up obscuring the reality of the price paid, who pays it, and how all of it influences treatment decisions."

=== Market exclusivity ===
Without price controls, competition lowers drug prices. But patents give companies a government-approved monopoly, usually up to 20 years from patent filing priority date. Since FDA approval can take 10–12 years, patent extensions allow exclusivity for up to 14 years after approval.

Pharma companies delay generics by getting follow-up patents on things like coatings, salt moieties, formulations, or administration methods. For example, AstraZeneca patented an enantiomer of omeprazole (Prilosec) without clear benefits, enabling it to sell esomeprazole (Nexium) at a 600% markup.

They also use "pay-to-delay" deals, paying generics to postpone entry. In 2008, AstraZeneca and Ranbaxy delayed Ranbaxy's generic Nexium launch until 2014.

Drug prices rise during exclusivity. Oral anticancer drugs launched in 2014 were six times more expensive than those from 2010 (adjusted for inflation). Between 2014 and 2015, over 260 brand-name drugs increased prices by 15.5% on average—130 times general inflation. This creates a natural monopoly, letting companies raise prices without government penalty.

The market entry of generics versions usually lower prices for a given drug, but over 500 drugs have only one generic competitor, which is not enough to push prices down. Brand companies also block generic manufacturers from drug samples needed for bioequivalence tests.

Mergers and acquisitions have further reduced competition. Valeant Pharmaceuticals acquired over 100 companies between 2008 and 2015. This consolidation trend continues to be a major problem.

=== Drug company profits ===
A Kaiser Family Foundation survey from June 2015 found the public citing "drug company profits" as the number one reason for the high cost of prescription drugs (picked by 77%), followed by the cost of medical research (64%), the cost of marketing and advertising (54%), and the cost of lawsuits against pharmaceutical companies (49%)." CBS MoneyWatch reports that in half of the 16 publicly held drugs companies in its study, profits exceeded R&D cost while in all but one of the companies, "corporate overhead" (which includes sales, administrative, and marketing) exceeded profits.

As of 2015, several pharmaceutical companies had developed a new business strategy "of dominating noncompetitive markets for older drugs and then increasing the price substantially".

In 2019 alone the price of over 3,400 drugs increased. For instance, Allergan raised prices on 51 drugs, just more than half its total medications. Some medications that Allergan manufactures saw a 9.5 percent jump in cost, while others saw a 4.9 percent increase in cost. This helped Allergan make a profit of over $15 million in 2018 alone. This trend is seen all across the healthcare industry, as the price of drugs increase so do the profits of the largest drug companies.

Researchers in JAMA found that between 2000 and 2018, 35 of the largest drug companies in the United States received a combined revenue of $11.5 trillion with a gross profit of $8.6 trillion. The key findings of this study relate to the median net income margin which is the percentage of revenue after all the companies expenses have been deducted. The median net income margin for the 35 drug companies was larger than that of the 357 non-pharmaceutical companies in the S&P 500 with the 35 companies having a 13.7 percent median net income margin while the S&P 500 had a 7.7 percent median net income margin. The lead author Professor Fred Ledley, who is the Director of the Center for Integration of Science and Industry at Bentley University, stated that "The pharmaceutical companies' profits are really indistinguishable, statistically, from those of technology companies."

One of the following programs is the 340B pricing program that allows hospitals and pharmacists to buy drugs at 30–50% off the retail prices. Per HRSA's 340B Drug Pricing Program, drug manufacturers are required to give certain organizations discounted drugs given these organizations fit the eligibility criteria for discounts. A big problem with 340B or similar programs is that pharmacies and hospitals can choose to bill for the discounted drugs at full price, defeating the purpose of the program to control drug prices and maintain affordability for low-income patients.

=== Orphan drugs ===
Drug companies can price new medicines, particularly orphan drugs, i.e. drugs that treat rare diseases, defined in the United States as those affecting fewer than 200,000 patients, at a cost that no individual person could pay, because an insurance company or the government are payors. Congress passed the Orphan Drug Act (ODA) in 1983 to incentivize pharmaceutical companies to research rare disease states like acquired hemophilia A and glioblastomas. Prior to the ODA, the FDA approved 34 orphan drugs. After the passage of the ODA, the FDA approved upwards of 500 orphan drugs in the decade to follow; successfully achieving the goal of increasing FDA approved orphan drugs. An orphan drug may cost as much as $400,000 annually. Monopolizing orphan drugs has proven to be a very profitable strategy for drug companies; rare diseases have few patients so heavy investment into marketing is not needed and patients rarely have other options. Furthermore, a majority of orphan drugs (93%) are covered by insurance payers. In the face of continued criticism, drug company executives defend this practice by noting that high cost allows the company to produce the drug for the very few patients who need it, and that most patients with very rare disorders rarely require any treatment at all.

Targeting orphan drugs may sometimes fail. For example, Glybera was a $1 million injection used to treat a rare metabolic deficiency, but was removed from the market due to lack of demand. However, there are many examples of orphan drug targeting proving to be a very profitable model for pharmaceutical companies. For example, Alexion Pharmaceuticals, Inc. released Soliris in 2007 with an indication for a rare blood disorder. Treatment with Soliris costs roughly $410,000 per year, and has led to $2.8 billion in total sales in 2016, even with a patient base of only 9,000 people.

=== FDA backlog in generic drug application review ===
The national debate over the rising cost of prescription medicines drew attention to the huge backlog of generic drug applications at the US Food and Drug Administration (FDA).

Usually, when enough generic drug products are introduced to the market, the cost to buy prescription medications decreases for both the insurer and the patient. Generic drugs have been shown to reduce healthcare costs in multiple ways, among them increasing competition which, in most cases, helps drive prices down.

Companies that want to manufacture generic drugs must show in their applications to the FDA that they guarantee quality and bioequivalence. In July 2016, the FDA generic drug application backlog comprised 4,036 generics. On the other hand, the European Medicines Agency (EMA), Europe's equivalent to the FDA, had only 24 generics drug applications awaiting approval. This count includes biologically based biosimilars awaiting approval. The FDA's generic count does not include biosimilars, which are more complicated medicines to review. According to the Generic Pharmaceutical Association, the median time it takes for the FDA to approve a generic is 47 months.

The Generic Drug User Fee Amendments of 2012 (GDUFA) built on the 1992 Prescription Drug User Fee Act by allowing the FDA to force generic drug manufacturers into funding increased inspections of offshore manufacturing plants, equalizing the regulatory burden of American manufacturers. Over 1,000 FDA inspectors were hired using this funding.

The EMA along with the European Commission, which handles approval of marketing materials, are approving generics and brand-name drugs in about a year on average, according to the EMA. In fiscal year 2014, the FDA had not approved any of about 1500 such applications by the end of 2014. The slow pace of the FDA review (6–12 months even for a priority review) has not allowed the market to correct itself in a timely manner, i.e. not allowed manufacturers to begin to produce and offer a product, when a price is too high. The following suggestions have been made: prioritize review of applications for essential drugs, i.e. move them up in the queue. If the FDA felt unable to make this largely economic evaluation about priority, the Department of Health and Human Services (DHHS) Office of the Assistant Secretary for Planning and Evaluation could do this. Second, the FDA could temporarily permit compounding. And third, the FDA could "temporarily permit the importation of drug products reviewed/approved by competent regulatory authorities outside the United States".

In a January 2016 senate hearing, the director of the FDA's Center for Drug Evaluation and Research said that increasing numbers of generic drug applications had "overwhelmed the FDA staff and created unpredictability and delay for industry", but that the FDA is ahead of schedule in reducing the backlog since then.

=== Research and development ===
Pharmaceutical companies argue that the prices they set for a drug are necessary to fund research. High drug prices can sometimes be a necessity to finance the high-risk and high-cost nature of pharmaceutical R&D.11% of drug candidates that enter clinical trials are successful and receive approval for sale. Although the cost of manufacturing is relatively low, the cost of developing a new drug is relatively high. In 2011, "a single clinical trial can cost $100 million at the high end, and the combined cost of manufacturing and clinical testing for some drugs has added up to $1 billion." It has been stated that the U.S. pharmaceutical industry is able to invent drugs that would not be profitable in countries with lower prices, because of the high drug prices in the United States.

Critics of pharmaceutical companies point out that only a small portion of the drug companies' expenditures are used for research and development, with the majority of their money being spent in the areas of marketing and administration.

European pharmaceutical companies are potentially as innovative as their U.S. counterparts, despite price controls. In addition, some countries, such as the United Kingdom and Germany, encourage comparative effectiveness reviews, whereby cost–benefit analyses of rival drugs determine which perform best.

Charles L. Hooper and David R. Henderson wrote in a 2016 publication of the Cato Institute that drug company's pricing correlates with the per capita income of foreign countries and they opined, that in some cases foreign governments drive such hard bargains to the point that they do not contribute to the cost of R&D, leaving "Americans to subsidize the R&D costs". Jeanne Whalen wrote in the Wall Street Journal in 2015, "The upshot is Americans fund much of the global drug industry's earnings, and its efforts to find new medicines." and that the U.S. market was "responsible for the majority of profits for most large pharmaceutical companies."

=== Intermediaries ===
Intermediaries are estimated to absorb about 41% of the revenue in pharmaceutical industry transactions.

==== Pharmacy benefit managers ====
Pharmacy benefit managers (PBMs) may increase drug prices they charge to their clients in order to increase their profits. For example, they may classify generic drugs as brand name drugs, because their contract does not contain a definition, or only an ambiguous, or a variable definition. This allows PBM's to classify drugs "for one purpose in one way, and for another purpose in another way", and to change the classification at different points during the life of a contract. This, as of 2010 un-litigated freedom, affects "drug coverage, making contract terms, and the reporting about the satisfaction of contract terms".

PBM's can make confidential business agreements with pharmaceutical companies, which PBM's have called collective buying power, then set a (lower) reimbursement maximum amounts to drugstores for generic drugs and set (higher) charges to insurers. This practice is also known as "spread pricing". There are examples where PBMs can double drug costs.

==== Drug rebates ====
Drug manufacturers may offer to pay an insurance company a rebate after they have sold them a drug for full price. This is largely invisible to the consumer, because a drug company does not report how much money it returns to the payer. In 2012, the aggregate in the US has been estimated at $40 billion per year. Many people are concerned that pharmaceutical rebates increase out-of-posts and overall insurance costs. Other critics also argue that drug manufactures may use rebates to incentivize insurance companies to get preferred tiered placement on drug formularies. The actual rebate amount can be influenced by many factors such as size of insurance clientele or the amount of insurance coverage provided for that drug. As solution to high medication costs as a result of drug rebates, the Trump administration have proposed allocating a portion of the drug rebate directly to Medicare patients at the time of purchase in order to offset growing out-of-pocket costs.

== Solutions ==
=== Discounts and drug coupons ===
With the rising cost of prescriptions, affordability becomes one of the biggest reasons people in the United States don't take prescriptions the correct way (i.e. cutting pills in half to extend the life of the prescription or opting for an over-the-counter alternative instead). However, there are programs and strategies available to cut prescription drug costs. Programs like GoodRx and RxSaver help the consumer navigate prescription drug costs in order to obtain affordable drugs.

Patients can obtain coupons online or at their doctor's office and use them to reduce their co-pays for a given prescription medication. For certain specialty drugs (most injectables and biologic agents), drug coupons have been found to save patients as much as $6 of every $10 they are asked to pay out-of-pocket. According to a 2017 study, for statin drugs, coupon users had higher drug utilization rates and lower rates of discontinuation than for non coupon users.

Prices vary from one pharmacy to another as listed prices determine what the insurance companies will have to pay for the drug. While this approach has been praised for lowering out-of-pocket costs and consequently reducing cost-related nonadherence, some argue that coupons simply incentivize patients to initiate expensive brand-name drugs, ultimately leading to more expensive premiums that cancel out any previous cost-saving effects of the coupons.

According to the 2017 consumer reports, it is important to compare prices of various retail pharmacies to get the best deal. Other tips include seeking 90-day prescription when possible, asking for the lowest price when deciding to pay for a medication, asking for generics (refer to "Generics versus Brand-name Products" for more details regarding generic drugs vs. brand-name drugs), comparing insurance plans and talking to your doctor about costs in order to find cheaper alternative(s).

=== Generics versus brand-name products ===
Although branded drugs represent a small minority of the total volume of drugs prescribed in the US, they are responsible for the majority of drug spending. A generic drug is a chemically equivalent, cheaper version of a brand-name drug. A generic drug form is required to have the same dose, strength and active ingredient(s) as the brand name drug; thus, they carry the same risks and benefits. To ensure compliance, the FDA Generic Drugs Program conducts stringent reviews (3,500 inspections of manufacturing plants per year). Generic medicines can only be sold after the patents of the brand name versions end. Due to this mandatory period of exclusivity for many brand-name drugs (a period in which generic medicines cannot be sold), delay of generic drugs reaching the market is expected. The high cost of upfront research that brand-name products have to go through to ensure safety and efficacy largely account for the high discrepancy in pricing between the two groups. Branded drugs may have marketing budgets that meet or exceed the cost of research and development. Generic drug manufacturers determine price based on what the name-brand equivalent is sold for. If multiple generic drug companies manufacture the same drug, price is often driven down towards production costs. If only a few generic drug manufacturers make the product, the price remains close to that of the branded drug. In some cases, price fixing occurs among the generic drug companies—instead of trying to beat competitors by lowering prices, the companies agree to maintain similar prices.

=== Value-based prices ===
An effort is being made to determine if the value of a drug justifies its price. Such measures include cost-minimization, cost-benefit, cost-effectiveness, and cost-utility analysis. They take into account the total costs, including hospital stays, repeated dosages, etc. and, comparing it to a similar treatment, determines whether a drug will actually minimize costs and whether it is more effective in curing the patient. These cost analyses can all be calculated from the point of view of the hospital, the healthcare system, the government, and the patient, so what is best for one party may not be best for another in terms of cost, making the value of a drug in terms of its price, sometimes a difficult thing to measure.

Quality-Adjusted Life Years (QALY) is a cost-effective measure that determines the value of a drug in terms of the quality of life achieved after taking a prescription drug, rather than the number of years the medication extends a patient's life. However, QALY is subjective to each patient and brings up moral dilemmas such as whether or not it is cost-effective to do a life-saving operation for someone who is elderly or has other complications. The subjectiveness of QALY is apparent on a case-by-case basis as it takes into account both the quality and quantity of life lived by an individual, with quality of life being the primary subjective factor. QALY does not completely reflect an individual's personal preferences in a particular clinical situation as their value based perspective of life is completely subjective.

In oncology, the American Society of Clinical Oncology and the European Society for Medical Oncology both developed specific tools in 2015 to grade the value of new drugs. to discuss the price/value ratio of anti-cancer drugs between physicians and patients and on a societal level. A 2017 review of anti-cancer drugs approved by the FDA between 2000 and 2015 found no relationship between their price and their value as measured by the scales of the ASCO and the ESMO.

=== Value-based pharmacy models ===
A related effort to reduce prices focuses on reducing payment layers (specifically the power of Pharmacy Benefit Managers) and alternative operational models within pharmacies. One such approach is the Membership Pharmacy Model, which shifts the financial incentive from prescription volume to patient outcomes.

This model typically bypasses Pharmacy Benefit Managers (PBMs) by establishing direct partnerships between a pharmacy and an employer group or patient. Key features often include:

- Price Transparency: Medications are sold at their Actual Acquisition Cost (AAC), eliminating prescription markups common in volume-based pharmacies.
- Value- or Fee-Based Revenue: The pharmacy's income is generated through a fixed, recurring membership fee paid by the employer or the patient. With employer or plan relationships, revenue may be supplemented by shared savings bonuses realized from reducing overall pharmacy spending.
- Lean Operations: Operational efficiency is achieved through methods like group synchronization, in which chronic medications for a member group are batched and refilled on the same schedule, allowing pharmacists to better provide clinical services such as Medication Therapy Management.

A 2022 pilot study demonstrated that this model led to significant financial results for a self-insured employer, including a 35% reduction in topline pharmacy spending and increased medication adherence for chronic conditions like diabetes and hyperlipidemia among enrolled patients.

=== Policy makers ===
The FDA has a "priority review process" for drugs which compete with another drug whose price exceeds its value-based price. Congress could also grant the FDA the ability to change the exclusivity period for new drugs. The FDA could also temporarily allow the import of drugs approved for sale outside the United States.

In December 2015, the DHHS held a public meeting and both houses of Congress had hearings on off-patent drugs with limited or no competition.

In 2017, Democratic party leaders announced a plan to enforce limits on how much pharmaceutical companies could raise drug prices. Under the plan, drugs with a "significant price increase" would have to explain the price rise to the HHS a minimum of 30 days before implementing the price hike. Although Turing Pharmaceuticals' Daraprim price rise of 5000% overnight would meet the proposal's definition of a "significant price increase," under the proposed plan, Mylan's well-publicized price increase for EpiPen would fall below the thresholds in the plan's criteria for enforcement.

=== New legislation ===
On October 9, 2017, Governor Jerry Brown of California passed Senate Bill 17, which focuses on transparency regarding pharmaceutical companies. Drug companies must give prior notice of price increases for prescription drugs. Drug Manufacturers must notify state purchasers such as CalPERS, Medi-Cal etc. 90 days prior to the planned effective date. Health plans and insurers must also annually report the following for all covered drugs (categorized by generic drugs, brand names, and specialty drugs):

- the 25 most prescribed drugs
- the 25 most costly drugs
- the 25 drugs with the highest year-over-year increase in total annual spending.

This information was intended to help the public and policy makers see and understand pharmaceutical spending trends.

=== Canada's model ===
In Canada, the Patented Medicine Prices Review Board (PMPRB) determines a maximum price for all drugs. In 1987, Bill C-22 established an extended period of protection for patents prior to licensing, which would allow for generics to enter the market. It also created the PMPRB, an independent semi-judicial body, which had the purpose of establishing review guidelines of individual drug prices, conduct investigations for allegations of excessive pricing, and negotiations to a voluntary compliance agreement. These efforts are to ensure that manufacturer prices are within justification, and not excessive. Excessive is interpreted based on the following criteria:

1. The price of an existing patented drug cannot increase by more than the Consumer Price Index (CPI)
2. The price of a new drug (in most cases) is limited so that the cost of therapy with the new drug is in the range of the costs of therapy with existing drugs in the same therapeutic class.
3. The price of a breakthrough drug is limited to the median of its prices in France, Germany, Italy, Sweden, Switzerland, Britain, and the United States. In addition, no patented drug can be priced above the highest price in this group of countries.

Low levels of drug spending in Canada are not solely attributable to the regulatory activities of the government, but also the actions of provincial and private insurance plans. These plans prevents price inflation through formulary management, independent clinical review of new products, reference-based pricing, the LCA, and limited use program. In reviewing formularies, the drug program reviews the therapeutic advantage of one product over the existing formulary, and only adds new drugs if program costs are unchanged. The reference-based pricing entails having a "reference product" for each category that is the baseline price, and utilizes an independent panel of pharmacists and doctors the University of British Columbia to evaluate the therapeutic discrepancies between drugs. The LCA, or low-cost alternative program establishes the price of generics for payment regardless if brand or genetics are used. The limited use program requires prior authorization for specific drugs, and restricts reimbursements to the approved rationale of prior authorizations (i.e. patients who have failed previous agents for the same indication).

The government is purchasing drugs similar to how the United States purchases medications for military personnel, but on a much wider scale.

Gail Wilensky, former director of Medicare and Medicaid, said that because most other countries' governments set prices and the U.S. does not, the United States is effectively subsidizing drug development for other countries. She believes if the United States started setting prices, it would disproportionately impact new drug development. She predicted that the tradeoff if prices were set too low, would be fewer new treatments coming to market in about a decade (due to the long development lifecycle). David Mitchell of the advocacy group Patients for Affordable Drugs argues that in the face of reduced pharmaceutical company profits, government-funded research could provide an ongoing pipeline of new treatments.

=== Healthcare providers ===
Healthcare providers can help lower drug prices by helping patients navigate the medication formulary, prescribing drugs covered by formularies, and participating in formulary development through Pharmacy and Therapeutics committees. The formulary system's effectiveness is directly correlated to the education of physicians, pharmacists and patients in understanding the justification of formulary compositions. This education includes drug information monographs to provide adequate resources to physicians in making clinical prescribing decisions, pharmacy education regarding any changes in the formulary, and patient education within the managed care system.

Formularies should be easily accessible for patient access as well, such as the online Medicare Planfinder, which is part of the Medicare Part D Plan.

Healthcare providers can substitute three-month for one-month supplies of medicines. A three-month supply represented a 29% decrease in out-of-pocket costs and an 18% decrease in total prescription costs in one study.

Prescribing combination drugs instead of two separate medications can also potentially reduce monthly copays.

Because the FDA has no regulations on drug companies in providing evidence that a new drug has a therapeutic advantage over an older drug, many physicians have a tendency to write prescriptions for drugs they are most familiar with. Oftentimes, these prescribing practices are influenced by manufacturer marketing to private practices or hospitals. Prescriber monitoring programs should be implemented to help physicians make cost-effective, evidence-based prescribing decisions, and foundation protocols should be established. This is important to ensure that the most clinically effective drugs are selected, and if a more expensive drug is selected, that appropriate therapeutic equivalence is evaluated with research supporting this decision. However, some organizations believe that if the federal government modified reimportation laws, the FDA could conduct a comprehensive assessment on manufacturing standards in other countries, and allow importation of drugs that meet or exceed U.S. safety standards for drug manufacturing.

Individual importation of lower cost prescription drugs from foreign countries – as done by 2% of U.S. consumers in 2011 and 2012 – is likely not an effective public health solution. However, if the federal government modified reimportation laws, the FDA could conduct a comprehensive assessment on manufacturing standards in other countries, and allow importation of drugs that meet or exceed U.S. safety standards for drug manufacturing.

=== Medicare for All ===
H.R.3, Elijah E. Cummings Lower Drug Costs Now Act, is a 2019 House of Representatives approved bill that would allow the Secretary of Health and Human Services (HSS) to negotiate with pharmaceutical companies for some of the most expensive drugs covered by Medicare Part D. This negotiation would manifest as a price ceiling, ensuring the Medicare Part D would pay no more than the negotiated price for the expensive drugs. This proposal received support from President Biden during his campaign. Bernie Sanders' 2019 Medicare for All proposal expands upon this bill proposal by requiring a universal health care system instead of private insurance. With this universal health care system, the negotiation style from H.R.3 would apply to everyone under Medicare for All, rather than just the current recipients of Medicare.

Price controls on the pharmaceutical industry have some empirical evidence to support the policy. The International Trade Administration reports the OECD companies with price controls drug prices range from 18 to 67 percent lower than the US's, depending on the drug.

There are several reasons why some experts believe that price controls on the pharmaceutical industry have some serious downsides. The National Bureau of Economic Research conducted a study in 2014 that found that price regulations significantly delayed the launch of new drugs. Moreover, a study done by Dr. David Stewart found that 260 life-years are lost per hour of delay for drug approval. Sanders' proposal may mitigate delays with the inclusion of an inability to negotiate section, which states if the negotiation is unable to conclude, the HSS may price the drug at no more than the amount of one of three different prices. These prices include the price the Secretary of Veterans Affairs pays, the price of the drug under section 8126 of title 38, United States Code, and the price paid under a section of Social Security.

=== Medicare Drug Price Negotiation Program ===
The Medicare Drug Price Negotiation Program is a United States federal program, administered by the Centers for Medicare & Medicaid Services (CMS), that negotiates lower prices for selected prescription drugs covered under Medicare Part B and Part D. It was created by the 2022 Inflation Reduction Act.

The Inflation Reduction Act repealed a longstanding prohibition, originally enacted in the Medicare Prescription Drug, Improvement, and Modernization Act of 2003, on Medicare's negotiating prescription drug prices. The first negotiated prices, termed "maximum fair prices" (MFPs), took effect on January 1, 2026 for 10 Part D drugs. Prices for an additional 15 drugs, including Ozempic and Wegovy, will take effect in 2027, with 15 further drugs to follow in 2028. From 2029 onward, 20 drugs are to be added each year.

In July 2025, the One Big Beautiful Bill Act expanded the program's orphan drug exclusion to cover drugs with multiple rare-disease designations, delaying or removing future-round candidates such as Keytruda and Opdivo.

The program has been the subject of more than a dozen federal lawsuits by drug companies and industry groups. On May 18, 2026, the Supreme Court of the United States denied certiorari in the first wave of petitions, leaving the program in effect.

== See also ==
- Medicare Prescription Drug, Improvement, and Modernization Act
- Essential medicines policies
- Prescription costs
- Prescription charges
- Sri Lanka National Pharmaceuticals Policy
