= Elijah Cummings Lower Drug Costs Now Act =

Proposed legislation

- Long title: To establish a fair price negotiation program, protect the Medicare program from excessive price increases, and establish an out-of-pocket maximum for Medicare part D enrollees, and for other purposes.
- Enacted by: the 117th United States Congress
- Sponsored by: Frank Pallone (D- NJ)
- Number of co-sponsors: 91

Legislative history
- Introduced in the House of Representatives as H.R. 3 by Frank Pallone (D–NJ) on April 22, 2021; Committee consideration by Energy and Commerce; Ways and Means; Education and Labor; Oversight and Reform; Veterans' Affairs

The Elijah Cummings Lower Drug Costs Now Act (H.R. 3) is proposed legislation in the 117th United States Congress. The bill is designed to lower prescription drug costs in the United States. Notably, the law gives the federal government the power to negotiate prescription drug prices. The legislation takes the name of late Maryland Representative Elijah Cummings.

== Background ==
The United States spends more money on prescription drugs than any other developed nation in the world. In 2020 alone, the United States spent $358.7 billion on prescription drugs. The United States does not guarantee universal healthcare coverage to its citizens. This means that individuals that do not have health insurance or are underinsured will have to pay either the full price of the drugs, or a still large amount of the money. Most people who have health insurance still have to pay at least some money towards prescription drugs, and some drugs may not be covered by health insurance at all.

Several polls have shown that a large share of the population has skipped filling drugs that were medically necessary because of the cost.

Insurance companies generally have pharmacy benefit managers negotiate discounts for drug prices on their behalf. It is unknown how much of the savings (if any) are given to the patients, as the details of these deals are generally not shared with the public. Even if the savings are passed on to the insurance company patients, it is unlikely that the savings would be extended to those who do not have insurance, meaning that they would still have to pay full price. Drug companies are willing to make deals on the prices of their drug with insurance companies because the insurance companies they negotiate lower drug prices with are more likely to have their patients use the company's drugs.

== Key provisions ==
=== Drug price negotiation ===
The bill would require the Department of Health and Human Services (HHS) to negotiate certain drug prices. Under current federal law, the HHS is not allowed to negotiate the drug prices for any drug covered by the Medicare prescription drug benefit, even though other government agencies like the VA and Medicaid are allowed to do so. Specifically, the law would require the HHS to negotiate maximum drug prices for:

1. Insulin Products (which are infamous in the United States for their high and increasing cost).
2. At least 25 single-source brand name drugs that do not have any generic version to compete with them by fiscal year 2023. The 25 drug prices that are negotiated would have to be either amongst the 125 drugs that account for the most spending nation-wide, or be amongst the 125 drugs that account for the most spending under the Medicare prescription drug benefit and Medicare advantage.
3. Starting in fiscal year 2024, 50 drugs with the same criteria as before would need to have their price negotiated.
4. Any newly approved, single-source, brand name drugs that exceeds a price threshold that the HHS has set that was determined to likely to meet the spending criteria.

The negotiated drug prices would have to meet the following criteria:

1. The negotiated drug price does not exceed than 120% of the drug's average price in Canada, the United Kingdom, Australia, Germany, France, and Japan.
2. If that data is not available, then the price must not exceed 85% of the United States average manufacturer price.

The drug prices that are negotiated must be offered under both Medicare and Medicare Advantage. The drug prices that are negotiated may also be offered by private insurance companies, but the insurance companies can choose to opt out.

Any drug manufacturers that do not comply with the law's negotiation requirements may be fined or receive tax penalties.

=== Medicare prescription drug inflation rebates ===
The law would require all drug manufacturers to give rebates to the CMS for drugs covered by Medicare for any drugs that cost $100 or more (average charge for one person to use the drug for a year), or for any drug that has an average manufacturer price that increasing faster than the rate of inflation. Companies that do not comply can be fined or receive tax penalties.

=== Caps for out-of-pocket expenses ===
The bill would reduce the cap on out-of-pocket expenses that a person enrolled in certain Medicare programs would have to pay. The traditional Medicare plan does not have any limit on out-of-pocket expenses. However, the Affordable Care Act required out-of-pocket expense caps for Medicare Advantage health plans, and such plans would have the cap reduced.

The bill extends these caps to Medicare Part D, which currently have no caps at all. Under Part D, when the costs of drugs rise, the person enrolled in Medicare must pay more in out-of-pocket expenses. This is known as cost-sharing.

All organizations that are contracted with the federal government to offer certain Medicare plans (known as Drug Plan Sponsors) must allow certain people who are enrolled in Medicare to make co-insurance payments in installments.

=== Drug price transparency ===
Drug companies would be required to report certain pieces of information on drugs that cost more than $100 and covered by Medicare or Medicaid based on the rate of price and spending increases, or face civil penalties. One provision of which would require that drug companies report certain drug price increases at least 30 days before the price increase takes effect. The HHS would then have to publish the information about the price increase on its website the day that the price is increased.

=== Improvements for low-income people on Medicare ===
The bill increases the number of people eligible to receive subsidies for premiums and other medical expenses for people with a Medicare Part D plan. The two main expansions of edibility are:

1. Allows people on Medicare to have higher incomes and still qualify for the subsidies.
2. Makes it do that certain people who are in U.S. Territories will automatically qualify for the subsidies.

=== Making Medicare cover dental, vision, and hearing ===
The bill would make the Medicare program also cover costs for

1. Certain dental costs; specifically dentures and other basic and major treatments that the CMS deems necessary, and certain preventative-screenings.
2. Certain hearing costs; specifically hearing aids and other treatments.
3. Certain vision costs; specifically glasses, contacts (and the fitting of them), and eye-exams.

=== Opioid and other funding ===
The bill provides funds for several programs related to public health, such as:

1. Innovation projects at the NIH through fiscal year 2030.
2. Innovation projects at the FDA through fiscal year 2029.
3. Established an " Opioid Epidemic Response Fund" that supports HHS programs and initiatives to prevent opioid abuse.

The bill also mandates the HHS to cut administrative costs related to healthcare in half over a 10-year period, including costs in Medicare, Medicaid, and private insurance. The HHS would be required to start a grant program so states can establish commissions to target unnecessary administrative costs as well.

=== Other healthcare program revisions ===
The bill makes some other changes to certain healthcare programs, and provides funds for other certain programs, such as:

1. Expands issue rights on certain Medigap policies.
2. Gives money for certain things to the Community Health Centers Fund through fiscal year 2025.
3. Creates grant programs for trauma and mental health services in schools.
4. Would require pricing models for Medicaid to be one that does not include profit or administrative expenses (known as a Pass-through_(economics) pricing model). It would ban the use of the spread-pricing model, which includes profits and administrative expenses.

=== Drug advertising ===
The CMS would be directed to make a regulation that requires drug ads that air on television include information about how much a 30-day supply of the medication or a typical course of the treatment will cost. The CMS had planned to establish a similar rule, but a federal court had struck it down on the basis that they did not have the power to do so.

== Cost ==
The Congressional Budget Office has estimated that the bill will save $345 billion in federal spending over the course of 7 years, and the CMS found it could reduce out-of-pocket costs by $158 billion over a decade.

== Legislative history ==
=== Summary ===
As of July 14, 2022

Congress	Short title	Bill number(s)	Date introduced	Sponsor(s)	# of cosponsors	Latest status
116th Congress	Elijah Cummings Lower Drug Costs Now Act of 2019	H.R. 3	August 9, 2019	Frank Pallone (D-NJ)	106	Passed in the House (230–192)
117th Congress	Elijah Cummings Lower Drug Costs Now Act of 2021	H.R. 3	April 22, 2021	Frank Pallone (D-NJ)	91	Referred to Committees of jurisdiction.

=== 116th Congress ===
The bill was introduced into the House of Representatives on September 19, 2019 during the 116th Congress by Rep. Frank Pallone (D-NJ). The bill received 106 co-sponsors. It passed the House on December 12, 2019 by a vote of (230-192). All Democrats voted for the measure, and all but 2 Republicans voted against it.

The bill was then sent to the Senate. The Senate, having been controlled by Republicans, did not bring the bill up to a vote.

== See also ==
- Healthcare in the United States
- Prescription Drug Costs
- Single Payer Healthcare Proposal
