= Most Favored Nation Drug Pricing =

Trump Political Agenda

Most Favored Nation Drug Pricing is a policy advanced during the first and second Trump administrations in which drug prices in the United States are tied to foreign drug prices.

== Background ==
Prescription drug prices in the United States are much higher than other nations. Many other countries have a centralized drug negotiation in which pharmaceutical companies are forced to give a single deal to the whole country. The US also has high costs from Pharmacy Benefit Managers which negotiate rebates with drug manufactures but do not pass these savings on to consumers. Trump framed the resulting system as the U.S. being forced to subsidize the cost of pharmaceutical research and other nations not paying their fair share.

In between the two Trump terms, the Biden administration passed the Inflation Reduction Act which allowed Medicare to negotiate prices for some drugs.

== First term ==
During Trump's first term he sought to bring American drug costs in line with other nations. Republican congressman Rick Scott introduced an MFN pricing bill to congress but failed to gain support. Democratic congresswoman Nancy Pelosi also introduced a bill for Medicare to negotiate prices with caps based on what other countries pay; however, she did not use the MFN terminology. HHS published new rules which applied MFN pricing to certain Medicare Part B drugs as a demonstration program on November 27, 2020. However, policy was quickly shut down by courts because the White House failed to follow the Administrative Procedure Act. The Biden administration subsequently removed the original MFN policy. PhRMA lobbyists opposed any form of structuring drug prices based on what other nations pay.

== Second term ==
Executive Order 14297, titled Delivering Most-Favored-Nation Prescription Drug Pricing to American Patients, was signed on 12 May 2025. The order aims to reduce the cost of prescription drugs by directing federal agencies to link U.S. prices to the lower prices paid for the same drugs in a group of other developed countries. Trump stated that the policy would reduce prescription drug prices significantly and end the U.S. "subsidizing the health care of foreign countries." He claimed prices could fall by 30% to 80% or even more. The order directs the Department of Health and Human Services to communicate price targets to pharmaceutical manufacturers and, if necessary, pursue rulemaking to impose MFN pricing across the U.S. healthcare system, including commercial markets, Medicare, and Medicaid. It also instructs the Department of Commerce, along with the U.S. Trade Representative, to take action against other nations that Trump claims are pursuing unfair practices to keep down drug prices. A different EO, which Trump signed in April 2025, directed the Food and Drug Administration to open up a re-importation process to bring drugs from Canada to the United States. This new EO directs the FDA to expand the reimportation program to other nations.

During the announcement for Executive Order 14297 Mehmet Oz, the Medicare and Medicaid administrator, noted that prices negotiated under existing Medicare rules still tend to be higher than what European systems pay.

=== Implementation ===
Prior to this Executive Order the Trump administration tried to pressure congress to include MFN pricing for Medicare in legislation, but Republican representatives opposed cutting Medicaid costs. PhRMA, the largest political force for the pharmaceutical industry, estimated that MFN pricing for Medicaid would cost the industry $1 trillion over the next decade. Stephen Ubl, the group's leader, particularly opposed the re-importation expansion. He said, "importing foreign prices from socialist countries would be a bad deal for American patients and workers". PhRMA did support Trump for targeting other countries that they believe are not paying enough for drugs.

AARP released a statement supporting the new EO, but the Wall Street Journal called out that important details were missing on how it could be implemented. Pharmaceutical industry executives and Republican representatives warned that reducing drug prices could stifle innovation.

In a follow up interview, HHS Secretary Robert F. Kennedy Jr. stated he expects price reductions to apply to Medicare and private markets. On May 20, HHS released follow up guidance, "The MFN target price is the lowest price in an OECD country with a GDP per capita of at least 60 percent of the U.S. GDP per capita." It is unclear how these changes will impact the existing agenda for Medicare price negotiations.

A Dutch expert noted that it may be difficult to compare US drug prices to prices paid by European countries as the specific price negotiated for a given drug is often kept secret. International price comparisons therefore rely on list or invoice prices, since net prices after confidential discounts and rebates are not publicly available in either the United States or Europe, and the gap between invoice and net prices is likely to be larger in the United States. The impact on foreign drug manufacturers is unclear.

JP Morgan's analyst stated that the new policy would also be difficult to implement due to expected legal challenges.

In September 2025, the administration reached an agreement with Pfizer, which committed to align some of its prices with those paid in other wealthy countries in exchange for a reprieve from planned pharmaceutical tariffs; the deal was announced alongside TrumpRx, a government website for direct purchases of discounted drugs. The Centers for Medicare & Medicaid Services introduced a voluntary MFN model for Medicaid (GENEROUS) and, in December 2025, proposed two mandatory Medicare models: the Global Benchmark for Efficient Drug Pricing (GLOBE) model for Part B, to take effect in the fourth quarter of 2026, and the Guarding U.S. Medicare Against Rising Drug Costs (GUARD) model for Part D, to take effect in the first quarter of 2027. Section 232 tariffs of up to 100% on pharmaceuticals took effect on July 31, 2026, with relief conditioned on manufacturers entering MFN pricing agreements. By September 2026, the White House stated that 26 drugmakers, covering 90% of the branded US market, had signed agreements, and that all state Medicaid programs had joined. An analysis reported by STAT found that the confidential agreements could exempt many medicines from the Medicare models and reduce projected savings by as much as 80%.
