= National average =

National average may refer to:

- National average salary
- National Average Wage, index for Average Indexed Monthly Earnings calculations
- National Average Drug Acquisition Cost, medicine pricing system in the US
- National Average (album), 2025 album by Big Special
