= Medicare Prompt Pay Correction Act =

Proposed United States legislation

Medicare Community Cancer Care Preservation Act of 2009
- Announced in: the 111th Congressth United States Congress

Codification
- Acts amended: Social Security Act (Title XVIII)

Legislative history
- Introduced in the Senate (S. 1221) and House (H.R. 1392) as S. 1221 / H.R. 1392 by Arlen Specter (D-PA) and Pat Roberts (R-KS) [Senate]; Gene Green (D-TX) and Ed Whitfield (R-KY) [House] on 2009

In United States legislation during the 111th Congress of 2009-2010, S. 1221 and H.R. 1392 are companion bipartisan bills that eliminate prompt pay discounts from the calculation of Average Sales Price (ASP), which is the basis for Medicare drug reimbursement rates for community cancer clinics. S. 1221 was introduced by Senators Arlen Specter (D-PA) and Pat Roberts (R-KS).

H.R. 1392 was introduced by Representatives Gene Green (D-TX), Ed Whitfield (R-KY), Mike Ross (D-AR), Ed Towns (D-NY), Diana DeGette (D-CO), Mike Rogers (R-MI), Betty Sutton (D-OH), Bart Gordon (D-TN), Lee Terry (R-NE) and Ralph Hall (R-TX), and has close to 50 cosponsors.

S.1221 and H.R. 1392 will amend title XVIII of the Social Security Act to ensure more appropriate payment amounts for drugs and biologicals under Part B of the Medicare Program by excluding customary prompt pay discounts extended to wholesalers from the manufacturer's Average Sales Price (ASP). Prompt pay discounts are provided by pharmaceutical manufacturers to drug distributors.

Because they are financing terms between manufacturers and distributors, prompt pay discounts are not passed on to community cancer clinics. However, the Medicare Modernization Act of 2003 (MMA) required that prompt pay discounts be included in the calculation of ASP. Their inclusion artificially reduces Medicare reimbursement rates by approximately 2%.
