= Association for Accessible Medicines =

Trade association for generic prescription drugs industry

The Association for Accessible Medicines (AAM), Washington, D.C., is a trade association representing the manufacturers and distributors of generic prescription drugs, manufacturers and distributors of bulk pharmaceutical chemicals, and suppliers of other goods and services to the U.S. generic drug industry. As the primary lobby for makers of generic drugs, AAM's stated mission is to advocate for public policies that facilitate timely access to lower-cost, FDA-approved generic and biosimilar medicines by consumers and patients. Over the 10-year period 2008 through 2018, the use of generic drugs generated $2 trillion in U.S. healthcare savings.

Prior to February 2017, AAM was the Generic Pharmaceutical Association (GPhA).

== History ==
GPhA was formed in May 2000 by the merger of the Generic Pharmaceutical Industry Association (GPIA) and the National Pharmaceutical Alliance (NPA). In January 2001, the other generic industry trade association in operation at the time, the National Association of Pharmaceutical Manufacturers (NAPM), merged with the newly formed GPhA, which completed the consolidation of three U.S.-focused generic trade associations into one national advocacy organization.

In 2003, GPhA supported passage of the Medicare Prescription Drug, Improvement, and Modernization Act (also called the Medicare Modernization Act or MMA), which resulted in the largest overhaul of Medicare in the public health program's history and created prescription drug coverage for Medicare beneficiaries (Medicare Part D).

In 2004, GPhA began promoting the potential benefits of developing a market for biosimilar versions of biologic therapies and provided answers to questions that the FDA posed in a September 2004 workshop on the scientific challenges of creating biosimilars. On May 2, 2007, GPhA's then-Chairman Bruce Downey testified before the House Energy and Commerce Committee Subcommittee on Health, urging Congress to pass legislation giving FDA the authority to approve biosimilars. Congress created an approval pathway for biosimilars (including interchangeables that are substitutable with their reference product) with passage of the Biologics Price Competition and Innovation Act, part of the Patient Protection and Affordable Care Act signed by President Obama on March 23, 2010. In 2015, GPhA launched the Biosimilars Council, which works to ensure a positive regulatory, reimbursement, political and policy environment for biosimilar products, and provide information to the public about the safety and effectiveness of biosimilars.

In 2011 and 2012, GPhA and the U.S. Food and Drug Administration negotiated the Generic Drug User Fee Act (GDUFA), which requires manufacturers of generic prescription drugs to pay application fees when submitting Abbreviated New Drug Applications (ANDAs) seeking approval for generic products.

GPhA is the U.S. representative to the International Generic and Biosimilar Medicines Association (IGBA), which advocates global interests of the generic pharmaceutical industry in collaborates with the Canadian Generic Pharmaceutical Association, Medicines for Europe, Japan Generic Medicines Association, and other IGBA members.

== Leadership ==
Dan Leonard is the chief executive officer of AAM. He succeeds Chester "Chip" Davis, Jr., who is now the president and chief executive officer of the Healthcare Distribution Alliance. Alok Sonig, CEO, US Generics and global head, Generics R&D & Biosimilars of Lupin Pharmaceuticals, serves as chair of the GPhA board of directors.

== Programs ==
- In furtherance of its mission, AAM supports and promotes more timely patient access to generic and biosimilar medicines.

== Membership ==
AAM members include almost 30 companies that manufacturer and distributor bulk pharmaceutical chemicals, supply contract research services, or provide other goods and services to the generic drug industry. Generic manufacturers supply 90 percent of the prescription medicine sold in the U.S.
