= John J. Castellani =

John Castellani
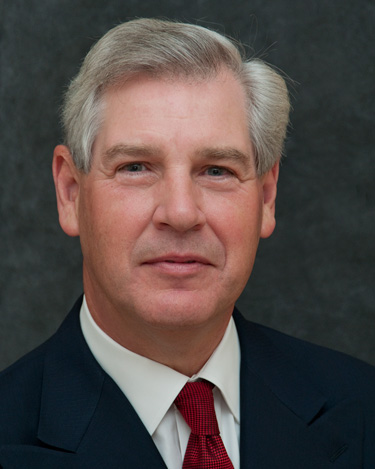

President & CEO of PhRMA
- In office 2010–2015
- Preceded by: Billy Tauzin
- Succeeded by: Stephen J. Ubl

Personal details
- Born: John J. Castellani Skaneateles, New York, U.S.
- Party: Republican
- Spouse: Terry Castellani
- Children: 2
- Education: Union College
- Profession: Lobbyist, business executive

John J. Castellani is an American public affairs executive and public policy advocate. He was the former president and chief executive officer of the Pharmaceutical Research and Manufacturers of America (PhRMA), a trade group representing U.S. pharmaceutical research and biopharmaceutical companies. Prior to joining PhRMA, Castellani led the Business Roundtable, a U.S. advocacy and lobbying group. Currently he is on the Pharmacist Partners Advisory Board.

== Early life and education ==
Castellani is from Skaneateles, New York, and is a Roman Catholic. He is married to the former Therese Ann Mulroy. They have two sons. Castellani is a graduate of Union College in Schenectady, New York, where he majored in biology and graduated in 1972.

== Career ==
Castellani started his career at General Electric in 1972 as an environmental scientist and strategic planner and left the company in 1977. He then served as Vice President of State, Federal and International Government Relations for TRW, a major defense contractor, from 1980 to 1992 and as. Vice President for Resources and Technology with the National Association of Manufacturers from 1977 to 1980.

He then became Executive Vice President of Tenneco Inc. from 1992 to 1999 .

Before joining PhRMA, Castellani was President and Chief Executive Officer of the Business Roundtable, an association of CEOs of leading U.S. corporations with a combined workforce of nearly 12 million employees and $6 trillion in annual revenues. The Business Roundtable was cited by the Financial Times as "the most influential chief executive lobbying group in the U.S." Castellani served at the Business Roundtable from May 2001 to July 2010.

Castellani is a former member of the Union College board of trustees. He is also an Ethics Resource Center Executive Fellow and a member of the Advisory Council of the Business Roundtable Institute for Corporate Ethics, in addition to being a member of The Economic Club of Washington, D.C.

He has served on the Connecticut Governor's Prevention Task Force as vice chair, on the board of directors of Keep America Beautiful, and on the U.S. Olympic Committee. He was president of the Business Government Relations Council and chair of the Fairfax County, Virginia Redevelopment and Housing Authority.
