= Wholesale acquisition cost =

Wholesale acquisition cost is the price of a medication set by a pharmaceutical manufacturer in the United States when selling to a wholesaler. Generally 20% is added to create the average wholesale price.
