= Medicare Prescription Drug Price Negotiation Act =

United States legislation

In January 2007, the 110th United States House of Representatives approved H.R. 4, the Medicare Prescription Drug Price Negotiation Act, a bill to require federal officials to negotiate with drug companies for lower prices for the 23 million senior citizens who have signed up for Medicare's prescription drug coverage. The bill was never passed into law. It would have repealed a ban on letting the government negotiate with manufacturers for lower prices — a provision that was part of the GOP-sponsored 2003 measure called the Medicare Prescription Drug, Improvement, and Modernization Act, which created the prescription drug program. Medicare drug price negotiation was eventually authorized in 2022 as part of the Inflation Reduction Act.

== Legislative history ==
Congress	Short title	Bill number(s)	Date introduced	Sponsor(s)	# of cosponsors	Latest status
110th Congress	Medicare Prescription Drug Price Negotiation Act of 2007	H.R. 4	January 5, 2007	John Dingell (D-MI)	198	Passed House (255-170)
110th Congress	Medicare Prescription Drug Price Negotiation Act of 2007	S. 3	January 4, 2007	Harry Reid (D-NV)	17	Cloture not invoked (55-42)
111th Congress	Medicare Prescription Drug Price Negotiation Act of 2010	H.R. 4752	March 3, 2010	Peter Welch (D-VT)	81	Died in committee
111th Congress	Medicare Prescription Drug Price Negotiation Act of 2010	S. 3413	May 25, 2010	Russ Feingold (D-WI)	0	Died in committee
112th Congress	Medicare Prescription Drug Price Negotiation Act of 2011	H.R. 2248	June 21, 2011	Peter Welch (D-VT)	29	Died in committee
112th Congress	Medicare Prescription Drug Price Negotiation Act of 2011	S. 44	January 25, 2011	Amy Klobuchar (D-MN)	8	Died in committee
113th Congress	Medicare Prescription Drug Price Negotiation Act of 2013	H.R. 1102	March 12, 2013	Peter Welch (D-VT)	40	Died in committee
113th Congress	Medicare Prescription Drug Price Negotiation Act of 2013	S. 117	January 23, 2013	Amy Klobuchar (D-MN)	8	Died in committee
114th Congress	Medicare Prescription Drug Price Negotiation Act of 2015	H.R. 3061	July 14, 2015	Peter Welch (D-VT)	33	Died in committee
114th Congress	Medicare Prescription Drug Price Negotiation Act of 2015	S. 31	January 6, 2015	Amy Klobuchar (D-MN)	9	Died in committee
115th Congress	Medicare Prescription Drug Price Negotiation Act of 2017	H.R. 242	January 4, 2017	Peter Welch (D-VT)	45	Died in committee
115th Congress	Medicare Prescription Drug Price Negotiation Act of 2017	S. 41	January 5, 2017	Amy Klobuchar (D-MN)	13	Died in committee
116th Congress	Medicare Prescription Drug Price Negotiation Act of 2019	H.R. 275	January 8, 2019	Peter Welch (D-VT)	37	Died in committee
117th Congress	Medicare Prescription Drug Price Negotiation Act of 2021	H.R. 2071	March 18, 2021	Peter Welch (D-VT)	12	Died in committee

No bill carrying the Medicare Prescription Drug Price Negotiation Act title was introduced in the 118th or 119th Congresses, following enactment of Medicare drug price negotiation through other legislation in 2022.

== Enactment via the Inflation Reduction Act ==
None of the bills above became law. The policy was instead enacted in 2022 through the Inflation Reduction Act (IRA; H.R. 5376), which directs the Secretary of Health and Human Services to negotiate prices with manufacturers for selected high-spending drugs covered under Medicare Part D and, beginning in 2028, Medicare Part B.
