= Citizens' Health Care Working Group =

Health care working group

The Citizen's Health Care Working Group (CHCWG) was charged with listening to the opinions of the general public about how the government can make health care work better for all Americans. For more than 15 months, the working group traveled around the country, held public meetings, and then devised a roadmap for change based on this commentary. Their recommendations were submitted to Congress and the President in Fall 2006. By creating the working group through Section 1014 of the Medicare Prescription Drug, Improvement, and Modernization Act of 2003, Congress bound itself to take action on the final results, meaning thereby, the President must comment and Congress must hold hearings on these recommendations.

== Community meetings ==
The Citizens Health Care Working Group had over 35 community meetings from January–June 2006. These meetings were hosted by either the Public Forum Institute or AmericaSpeaks. Seated around tables of ten, individuals participated in small table discussions and voted on electronic keypads. They also participated in discussions involving the entire group, ranging in size from 100 to 300 people.

The Working Group also encouraged groups to hold their own community meeting by downloading the community meeting kit available on their website.

== Health care poll ==
The Citizens' Health Care Working Group also invites people to participate in this process by answering a short health care poll. This allows individuals to share their input with the Working Group for consideration for the final recommendations.

== Required governmental action ==
A report from this group was due to both the Congress and the President by September 2006.

This group is distinguished from other health care efforts because the law that created it requires the President to respond to the recommendations, and requires the following five Congressional committees to hold hearings on them:

- Finance
- Energy and Commerce
- HELP
- Ways and Means
- Education and the Workforce

== Selection of the Working Members ==
As set forth in Public Law 108-173, Sec. 1014, the Working Group is made up of 14 members selected by Comptroller General of the United States, David Walker. By law, the Secretary of Health and Human Services (HHS) serves as the 15th member. Comptroller General Walker chose the 14 members of the Working Group from among more than 530 applicants; the selections were announced Feb. 28, 2005.

None of the appointees are current elected officials or registered lobbyists. In addition, only one of the 14 appointees, former Governor of Utah and now HHS Secretary Mike Leavitt, is from the Washington, D.C. area. The members represent many regions of the country and a broad range of health care perspectives, including consumers, providers, employers and workers. The appointments include people with personal experience or expertise in paying for benefits and issues of access to care.

From among the 14, Walker selected Randall L. Johnson, a corporate benefits specialist, to serve as chairman of the Working Group, and Catherine G. McLaughlin, a health economist, as vice chair.
