= Average wholesale price =

In the United States, the average wholesale price (AWP) is a prescription drug term referring to the average price for medications offered at the wholesale level. The metric was originally intended to convey real pricing information to third-party payers, including government prescription drug programs. Commercial publishers of drug pricing data such as Red Book have published AWP data since at least 1970. The pricing information is "based on data obtained from manufacturers, distributors, and other suppliers." However, despite the data source, published AWPs are generally inflated by 20% relative to actual market prices or wholesale acquisition cost for prescription drugs.

For decades, AWP has been used to determine third-party reimbursement throughout the health care industry because third party payers have no other reliable method of obtaining real market prices as most contracts contain confidentiality clauses. Reimbursement amounts are typically based on AWP minus some percentage. As a result of published AWPs often exceeding real prescription drug prices, many states have brought lawsuits against pharmaceutical manufacturers and others, alleging fraud and violations of consumer protection laws.

== History ==
It was created in 1969.

== See also ==
- National Average Drug Acquisition Cost
- Wholesale acquisition cost (WAC)
- Average Manufacturer Price (AMP)
