= Zone Program Integrity Contractor =

The Zone Program Integrity Contractor (ZPIC) is an entity established in the United States by the Centers for Medicare & Medicaid Services (CMS) to combat fraud, waste and abuse in the Medicare program.

== Background ==
A Zone Program Integrity Contractor (ZPIC) is a company contracted by the CMS to assist in identifying and investigating abuse, fraud, or waste within the Medicare program. It was created as a result of the Medicare Prescription Drug, Improvement, and Modernization Act of 2003, established seven zones throughout the United States to process Medicare claims, CMS created ZPICs to more effectively protect the Medicare program. ZPICs replaced Program Safeguard Contractors (PSC), which had been established by the Health Insurance Portability and Accountability Act of 1996.
