= Bruce Downey =

American businessperson and former CEO

Bruce L. Downey
- Education: Miami B.A. Ohio State, J.D.
- Employer: New Spring Capital
- Title: Partner

Bruce Downey is the former chairman and CEO of Barr Pharmaceuticals (bought by Teva Pharmaceuticals) and in 2009 became a partner at New Spring Capital, a venture capital firm.

== Career ==
Downey began his career in the Honors Program of the U.S. Department of Justice. He later worked as a special litigation counsel at the U.S. Department of Energy and then became a partner at the law firm of Winston & Strawn.

In January 1993, Downey was appointed president and chief operating officer of Barr Pharmaceuticals. He became chairman and CEO in 1994 when Barr's founder Edwin A. Cohen stepped down. During Downey's tenure at Barr, the company grew revenue from $60 million to more than $2.5 billion and became the fourth largest global generic drug company. In 2008, Barr Pharmaceuticals was acquired by Teva Pharmaceutical. Downey was named Ernst & Young Entrepreneur of the Year in 2009.

Downey is a member of the board of directors for Cardinal Health and Momenta Pharmaceuticals. He also served as the chairman of the board of directors of the Generic Pharmaceutical Association from 2006 to 2008.

== Education ==
Downey received a bachelor's degree with honors from Miami University in Oxford, Ohio. He then received a Juris Doctor (J.D.) degree from Ohio State University Moritz College of Law in 1973, where he was an editor of the Ohio State Law Journal and graduated Order of the Coif.
