= Task Force on Prescription Drugs =

US drug market commission

The cover of the Final Report submitted by the Task Force on Prescription Drugs, submitted to President Richard Nixon in 1969.

The Task Force on Prescription Drugs, established in May 1967, was a commission chaired by the Assistant Secretary for Health and Scientific Affairs. The commission was convened by John W. Gardner, who was the United States Secretary of Health, Education, and Welfare. Members of the commission included the Food and Drug Administration Commissioner, the Surgeon General, and the Social Security Commissioner.

The Task Force submitted the findings of their comprehensive analysis to President Richard Nixon in 1969. The Task Force documented the state of the American prescription drug market in the 1960s, and influenced Medicare policy in the subsequent decades.
