= National Average Drug Acquisition Cost =

Medicine pricing system in United States

The National Average Drug Acquisition Cost (NADAC) is the approximate average invoice price pharmacies pay for medications in the United States. This applies to chain and independent pharmacies but not mail order and specialty pharmacies. Rebates and other off-invoice discounts pharmacies may receive after paying an invoice are not included. The NADAC data is calculated by the Centers for Medicare and Medicaid Services.

== History ==
The NADAC was created in 2011, primarily through the collaboration and initiative of two pharmacists, Mike Sharp, former Indiana Medicaid Pharmacy Director and Joseph Fine, former Technical Pharmacy Director at CMS. By 2017, 45 State Medicaid programs utilized the NADAC as their primary pharmacy payment benchmark. Subsequently, several transparent PBMs also began using it. The NADAC is widely regarded as a key, innovative driver of United States prescription drug pricing transparency and cost plus reimbursement payment modalities.

The NADAC is publicly available and all of the drug pricing file compendia publishers have adopted it in their standardized drug information and pricing benchmark files. The NADAC initiated the widespread cost-plus pharmacy payment migration when CMS added the provision of a "professional" dispensing fee (which includes counseling and other administrative services) for Fee-for-service Medicaid programs.

== See also ==
- Average wholesale price
