= Medicare Prescription Drug, Improvement, and Modernization Act =

2003 United States federal law

- Long title: An act to amend title XVIII of the Social Security Act to provide for a voluntary prescription drug benefit under the medicare program and to strengthen and improve the medicare program, and for other purposes.
- Acronyms (colloquial): Medicare Modernization Act or MMA
- Enacted by: the 108th United States Congress

Citations
- Public law: 108 - 173

Legislative history
- Introduced in the House as H.R. 1 (Medicare Prescription Drug and Modernization Act of 2003) by Dennis Hastert (R–IL) on June 25, 2003; Passed the House on June 27, 2003 (216–215, 1 Present); Passed the Senate on July 7, 2003 (Unanimous Consent); Reported by the joint conference committee on November 21, 2003; agreed to by the House on November 22, 2003 (220–215) and by the Senate on November 25, 2003 (54–44); Signed into law by President George W. Bush on December 8, 2003

United States Supreme Court cases
- Caraco Pharmaceutical Laboratories, Ltd. v. Novo Nordisk A/S, 566 U.S. 399 (2012); American Hospital Association v. Becerra, No. 20-1114, 596 U.S. ___ (2022)

The Medicare Prescription Drug, Improvement, and Modernization Act, also called the Medicare Modernization Act or MMA, is a federal law of the United States, enacted in 2003. It produced the largest overhaul of Medicare in the public health program's 38-year history.

The MMA was signed by President George W. Bush on December 8, 2003, after passing in Congress by a close margin.

== Prescription drug benefits ==
The MMA's most touted feature is the introduction of an entitlement benefit for prescription drugs, through tax breaks and subsidies.

In the years since Medicare's creation in 1965, the role of prescription drugs in patient care has significantly increased. As new and expensive drugs have come into use, patients, particularly senior citizens at whom Medicare was targeted, have found prescriptions harder to afford. The MMA was designed to address this problem.

The benefit is funded in a complex way, reflecting diverse priorities of lobbyists and constituencies.

- It provides a subsidy for large employers to discourage them from eliminating private prescription coverage to retired workers (a key AARP goal);
- It prohibits the federal government from negotiating discounts with drug companies;
- It prevents the government from establishing a formulary, but does not prevent private providers such as health maintenance organizations (HMO) from doing so.

=== Basic prescription drug coverage ===
Beginning in 2006, a prescription drug benefit called Medicare Part D was made available. Coverage is available only through insurance companies and HMOs, and is voluntary.

Enrollees paid the following initial costs for the initial benefits: a minimum monthly premium of $24.80 (premiums may vary), a $180 to $265 annual deductible, 25% (or approximate flat copay) of full drug costs up to $2,400. After the initial coverage limit is met, a period commonly referred to as the "Donut Hole" begins when an enrollee may be responsible for the insurance company's negotiated price of the drug, less than the retail price without insurance. The Affordable Care Act, also commonly known as "Obamacare", modified this measure.

== Medicare Advantage plans ==
With the passage of the Balanced Budget Act of 1997, Medicare beneficiaries were given the option to receive their Medicare benefits through private health insurance plans, instead of through the Original Medicare plan (Parts A and B). These programs were known as "Medicare+Choice" or "Part C" plans. Pursuant to the Medicare Prescription Drug, Improvement, and Modernization Act of 2003, the compensation and business practices for insurers that offer these plans changed, and "Medicare+Choice" plans became known as "Medicare Advantage" (MA) plans. In addition to offering comparable coverage to Part A and Part B, Medicare Advantage plans may also offer Part D coverage.

=== Changes to plans ===
With the MMA, new Medicare Advantage plans were established with several substantive differences from the previous Medicare + Choice plans, including:

- enrollees sign on for a whole year
- care could be restricted to specific provider networks
- formularies were to be used to restrict prescription drug choices
- prescription coverage would be deferred to the patient or a Medicare Part D prescription plan
- care other than emergency care can be restricted to a particular region
- federal reimbursement can be adjusted according to the health risk of the enrollees

== Health savings accounts ==
The MMA created a new Health Savings Account statute that replaced and expanded the previous Medical Savings Account law by expanding allowable contributions and employer participation. After the first 10 years over 12 million Americans were enrolled in HSAs (AHIP;EBRI).

== Other provisions ==
While nearly all agreed that some form of prescription drug benefit would be included, other provisions were the subject of prolonged debate in Congress. The complex legislation also changed Medicare in the following ways:

- it mandated a six-city trial of a partly privatized Medicare system (by 2010)
- it gave an extra $25 billion to rural hospitals (at the request of congressional representatives in the rural West)
- it required higher fees from wealthier seniors
- it added a pretax health savings account for working people
- it required Medicare Part D plans to support electronic prescribing, with a planned implementation date of April 2009.

=== Medicare administration of claims ===
In addition, the legislation mandated a major overhaul of how Part A and Part B claims are processed.

Under the new legislation, the Fiscal Intermediaries (FIs) and carriers would be replaced by Medicare Administrative Contractors (MAC's), serving both Parts A and B, and would be consolidated into fifteen Jurisdictions:

- Jurisdiction 1—California, Hawaii, and Nevada, plus American Samoa, Guam, and the Northern Mariana Islands
- Jurisdiction 2—Alaska, Idaho, Oregon, and Washington
- Jurisdiction 3—Arizona, Montana, North Dakota, South Dakota, Utah, and Wyoming
- Jurisdiction 4—Colorado, New Mexico, Oklahoma, and Texas
- Jurisdiction 5—Iowa, Kansas, Missouri, and Nebraska
- Jurisdiction 6—Illinois, Minnesota, and Wisconsin
- Jurisdiction 7—Arkansas, Louisiana, and Mississippi
- Jurisdiction 8—Indiana and Michigan
- Jurisdiction 9—Florida, plus Puerto Rico and the U.S. Virgin Islands
- Jurisdiction 10—Alabama, Georgia, and Tennessee
- Jurisdiction 11—North Carolina, South Carolina, Virginia, and West Virginia
- Jurisdiction 12—Delaware, the District of Columbia, Maryland, New Jersey, and Pennsylvania
- Jurisdiction 13—Connecticut and New York
- Jurisdiction 14—Maine, Massachusetts, New Hampshire, Rhode Island, and Vermont
- Jurisdiction 15—Kentucky and Ohio

Four "Specialty MAC Jurisdictions" were also created to handle durable medical equipment and home health/hospice claims:

- Jurisdiction A—consists of all states in Jurisdictions 12, 13, and 14
- Jurisdiction B—consists of all states in Jurisdictions 6, 8, and 15
- Jurisdiction C—consists of all states and territories in Jurisdictions 4, 7, 9, 10, and 11
- Jurisdiction D—consists of all states and territories in Jurisdictions 1, 2, 3, and 5

Finally, the underlying contracts would be subject to competition, and would also be subject to the requirements of the Cost Accounting Standards and the Federal Acquisition Regulation.

== Legislative history ==
According to the New York Times December 17, 2004 editorial W.J."Billy" Tauzin, the Louisiana Republican who chaired the Energy and Commerce Committee from 2001 until February 4, 2004, was one of the chief architects of the new Medicare law. In 2004 Tauzin was appointed as chief lobbyist for the Pharmaceutical Research and Manufacturers of America (PhRMA), the trade association and lobby group for the drug industry with a "rumored salary of $2 million a year," drawing criticism from Public Citizen, the consumer advocacy group. They claimed that Tauzin "may have been negotiating for the lobbying job while writing the Medicare legislation." Tauzin was responsible for including a provision that prohibited Medicare from negotiating prices with drug companies.

It's a sad commentary on politics in Washington that a member of Congress who pushed through a major piece of legislation benefiting the drug industry, gets the job leading that industry.

— Public Citizen President Joan Claybrook 2004

House Democratic leader Nancy Pelosi said,

I think if seniors want to know why the pharmaceutical companies made out so well at their expense, all they have to do is look at this. This is an abuse of power. This is a conflict of interest.

— House Democratic leader Nancy Pelosi 2004

The bill was debated and negotiated for nearly six months in Congress, and finally passed amid unusual circumstances. Several times in the legislative process the bill had appeared to have failed, but each time was saved when a couple of Congressmen and Senators switched positions on the bill.

The bill was introduced in the House of Representatives early on June 25, 2003, as H.R. 1, sponsored by Speaker Dennis Hastert. All that day and the next the bill was debated, and it was apparent that the bill would be very divisive. In the early morning of June 27, a floor vote was taken. After the initial electronic vote, the count stood at 214 yeas, 218 nays.

Three Republican representatives then changed their votes. One opponent of the bill, Ernest J. Istook Jr. (R-OK-5), changed his vote to "present" upon being told that C.W. Bill Young (R-FL-10), who was absent due to a death in the family, would have voted "aye" if he had been present. Next, Republicans Butch Otter (ID-1) and Jo Ann Emerson (MO-8) switched their vote to "aye" under pressure from the party leadership. The bill passed by one vote, 216–215.

On June 26, the Senate passed its version of the bill, 76–21. The bills were unified in conference, and on November 21, the bill came back to the House for approval.

The bill came to a vote at 3 a.m. on November 22. After 45 minutes, the bill was losing, 219–215, with David Wu (D-OR-1) not voting. Speaker Dennis Hastert and Majority Leader Tom DeLay sought to convince some of dissenting Republicans to switch their votes, as they had in June. Istook, who had always been a wavering vote, consented quickly, producing a 218-216 tally. In a highly unusual move, the House leadership held the vote open for hours as they sought two more votes. Then-Representative Nick Smith (R-MI) claimed he was offered campaign funds for his son, who was running to replace him, in return for a change in his vote from "nay" to "yea." After controversy ensued, Smith clarified no explicit offer of campaign funds was made, but that he was offered "substantial and aggressive campaign support" which he had assumed included financial support.

At about 5:50 a.m., Otter and Trent Franks (AZ-2) were convinced to switch their votes. With passage assured, Wu voted yea as well, and Democrats Calvin M. Dooley (CA-20), Jim Marshall (GA-3) and David Scott (GA-13) changed their votes to the affirmative. But Brad Miller (D-NC-13), and then, Republican John Culberson (TX-7), reversed their votes from "yea" to "nay". The bill passed 220–215.

The Democrats cried foul, and Bill Thomas, the Republican chairman of the Ways and Means committee, challenged the result in a gesture to satisfy the concerns of the minority. He subsequently voted to table his own challenge; the tally to table was 210 ayes, 193 noes.

The Senate's consideration of the conference report was somewhat less heated, as cloture on it was invoked by a vote of 70–29. However, a budget point of order was raised by Tom Daschle, and voted on. As 60 votes were necessary to override it, the challenge was actually considered to have a credible chance of passing.

For several minutes, the vote total was stuck at 58–39, until Senators Lindsey Graham (R-SC), Trent Lott (R-MS), and Ron Wyden (D-OR) voted in quick succession in favor to pass the vote 61–39. The bill itself was finally passed 54–44 on November 25, 2003, and was signed into law by the President on December 8.

== Costs ==
Initially, the net cost of the program was projected at $400 billion for the ten-year period between 2004 and 2013. Administration official Thomas Scully instructed analyst Richard Foster not to tell Congress of Foster's finding that the cost would actually be over $500 billion. One month after passage, the administration estimated that the net cost of the program over the period between 2006 (the first year the program started paying benefits) and 2015 would be $534 billion. As of February 2009, the projected net cost of the program over the 2006 to 2015 period was $549.2 billion.

== Bar to negotiation of prescription drug prices ==
After the enactment of Medicare Prescription Drug, Improvement, and Modernization Act in 2003, only insurance companies administering Medicare prescription drug program, not Medicare, would have the legal right to negotiate drug prices directly with drug manufacturers. The Medicare Prescription Drug Act expressly prohibited Medicare from negotiating bulk prescription drug prices. Oregon Representative Peter DeFazio said, "We could provide a much more meaningful benefit if we negotiated lower prices as other nations have done," and his Maine colleague Tom Allen, remarked on the absurdity, "that the government will not be able to negotiate lower prices," for the drugs on which it plans to spend $400 billion in the next decade.

The "donut hole" provision of the Patient Protection and Affordable Care Act of 2010 was an attempt to correct the issue. In 2022, the Inflation Reduction Act removed this ban and allowed Medicare to begin negotiating drug prices starting in 2026.

== See also ==
- Citizens' Health Care Working Group
- Medicaid
- Medicare (United States)
- Medicare Catastrophic Coverage Act of 1988, previous expansion, repealed 1989
- Medicare dual eligible
- Medicare Part D
- Medicare Prompt Pay Correction Act
- National pharmaceuticals policy
- National Quality Cancer Care Demonstration Project Act of 2009
- Pharmaceutical company
- Pharmacology
- Prescription drug prices in the United States
- Recovery Audit Contractor
- Thomas A. Scully
- Zone Program Integrity Contractor
