= Medicare Part D coverage gap =

Period of consumer payment for prescription medication costs

The Medicare Part D coverage gap (informally known as the Medicare donut hole) was a period of consumer payments for prescription medication costs that lay between the initial coverage limit and the catastrophic coverage threshold when the consumer was a member of a Medicare Part D prescription-drug program administered by the United States federal government. The gap was reached after a shared insurer payment - consumer payment for all covered prescription drugs reached a government-set amount, and was left only after the consumer had paid full, unshared costs of an additional amount for the same prescriptions. Upon entering the gap, the prescription payments to date were re-set to $0 and continued until the maximum amount of the gap was reached or the then current annual period lapses. In calculating whether the maximum amount of gap had been reached, the "True-out-of-pocket" costs (TrOOP) were added together.

A health insurance company provided this explanation about TrOOP:

"TrOOP includes the amount of your Initial Deductible (if any) and your co-payments or co-insurance during the Initial Coverage stage. While the Donut Hole includes what you pay when you fill a prescription and of the 75% Donut Hole discount on brand-name drugs, it includes the 70% Donut Hole Discount paid by the drug manufacturer. The additional 5% Donut Hole discount on brand-name drugs and the 75% Donut Hole discount on generics do not count toward TrOOP as they are paid by your Medicare Part D plan."

TrOOP also included payments made for a consumer's drugs by any of the following programs or organizations: "Extra Help" from Medicare; Indian Health Service; AIDS drug assistance programs; most charities; and most State Pharmaceutical Assistance Programs (SPAPs).

Provisions of the Patient Protection and Affordable Care Act of 2010 gradually phased out the coverage gap, eliminating it in 2020.

== Details ==
In 2006, the first year of operation for Medicare Part D, the doughnut hole in the defined standard benefit covered a range in true out-of-pocket expenses (TrOOP) costs from $750 to $3,600. (The first $750 of TrOOP comes from a $250 deductible phase, and $500 in the initial coverage limit, in which the Centers for Medicare and Medicaid Services (CMS) covers 75 percent of the next $2,000.) In the first year of operation, there was a substantial reduction in out-of-pocket costs and a moderate increase in medication utilization among Medicare beneficiaries, although there was no evidence of improvement in emergency department use, hospitalizations, or preference-based health utility for those eligible for Part D.

The dollar limits increase yearly.

== 2020 Medicare Part D Standard Drug Benefit ==
The following table shows the Medicare benefit breakdown (including the doughnut hole) for 2020.

2020 Medicare Part D Standard Benefit
Coverage Phase	Total Annual Drug Cost (Note: Represents total negotiated drug price)	Percentage Paid by Beneficiary	Percentage Paid by Plan
Deductible	$0–$435 (Note: Usually no deductible for Tier 1 and Tier 2 drugs)	100%	0%
Initial Coverage	$435–$4,020	25% (Note: Or the Prescription Drug Plan (PDP) co-payment, if applicable)	75%
"Donut Hole"	$4,020–$6,350	25% (Note: Beneficiaries MUST pay 25%; Generic and brand cost apply differently to TrOOP in Donut Hole)	75%
Catastrophic Coverage	over $6,350 (Note: $6,350 Out-of-Pocket Threshold (TrOOP))	5% (Note: Or $3.60 (generics) and $8.95 (brand-name), whichever is greater)	95% (Note: Plan pays 15%, Medicare pays 80%)

The costs shown in the table above represent 2020 defined standard Medicare Part D prescription drug plan parameters released by the Centers for Medicare and Medicaid Services (CMS) in April 2017. Individual Medicare Part D plans may choose to offer more generous benefits but must meet the minimum standards established by the defined standard benefit.

The 2020 Medicare Part D standard benefit includes a deductible of $435 (amount beneficiaries pay out of pocket before insurance benefits kick in) and 25% coinsurance, up to $6,350. The catastrophic stage is reached after $6,350 of out-of-pocket spending, then beneficiaries pay 5% of the total drug cost or $3.60 (for generics) and $8.95 (for brand-name drugs), whichever is greater.

2020 Donut Hole Discount: Part D enrollees will receive a 75% Donut Hole discount on the total cost of their brand-name drugs purchased while in the Donut Hole. The discount includes a 70% discount paid by the brand-name drug manufacturer and a 5% discount paid by your Medicare Part D plan. The 70% paid by the drug manufacturer combined with the 25% you pay, count toward your TrOOP or Donut Hole exit point. For example: If you reach the Donut Hole and purchase a brand-name medication with a retail cost of $100, you will pay $25 for the medication, and receive $95 credit toward meeting your 2020 total out-of-pocket spending limit.

Medicare Part D beneficiaries who reach the Donut Hole will also pay a maximum of 25% co-pay on generic drugs purchased while in the Coverage Gap (receiving a 75% discount). For example: If you reach the 2020 Donut Hole, and your generic medication has a retail cost of $100, you will pay $25. The $25 that you spend will count toward your TrOOP or Donut Hole exit point.

== Low Income Subsidy ==
The Low-Income Subsidy (LIS), also known as "Extra Help" provides additional cost-sharing and premium assistance for eligible low-income Medicare Part D beneficiaries with incomes below 150% of the Federal Poverty Level and limited assets. Individuals who qualify for the Low-Income Subsidy (LIS) or who are also enrolled in Medicaid do not have a coverage gap.

To qualify for the LIS, Medicare beneficiaries must qualify for full Medicaid benefits, be enrolled in Medicare Savings Programs (MSP), and receive Supplemental Security Income (SSI). These individuals automatically qualify for the subsidy and do not have to apply separately. Others may qualify after applying through their state Medicaid programs or through the Social Security Administration (SSA) and fulfil income and asset requirements. In a marketplace review conducted by the Kaiser Family Foundation in 2010, only 40% of eligible low-income beneficiaries who did not automatically qualify for the LIS actually received it.

The majority of Medicare beneficiaries who qualify for the LIS will pay no premiums or deductibles and no more than $8.25 for each drug that their plan covers. In addition, beneficiaries with Extra Help are not penalized for late enrollment in a Part D plan. LIS recipients also benefit from a Continuous Special Enrollment Period to join or switch plans during any time of the year. They do not need to wait for the formal Annual Enrollment Period. Any changes made to their plans will be applied the following month.

Low-Income Subsidy "Extra Help" Qualifications for 2017-2018
Household Size	Maximum Annual Income (Note: Does NOT include food stamp assistance, housing assistance, medical treatment and drugs)	Maximum Resources (Note: Does NOT include home, car or life insurance policies)
Individual	$18,090	$13,820
Married Couple	$24,360	$27,600

== Impact on Medicare beneficiaries ==
The U.S. Department of Health and Human Services estimates that more than a quarter of Part D participants stop following their prescribed regimen of drugs when they hit the doughnut hole.

Every Part D plan sponsor must offer at least one basic Part D plan. They may also offer enhanced plans that provide additional benefits. For 2008, the percentage of stand-alone Part D (PDP) plans to offer some form of coverage within the doughnut hole rose to 29 percent, up from 15 percent in 2006. The percentage of Medicare Advantage/Part D plans (MA-PD) plans offering some form of coverage in the coverage gap is 51 percent, up from 28 percent in 2006. The most common forms of gap coverage cover generic drugs only.

Among Medicare Part D enrollees in 2007 who were not eligible for the low-income subsidies, 26 percent had spending high enough to reach the coverage gap. Fifteen percent of those reaching the coverage gap (four percent overall) had spending high enough to reach the catastrophic coverage level. Enrollees reaching the coverage gap stayed in the gap for just over four months on average.

According to a study done in 2007, premiums for plans offering gap coverage are roughly double those of defined standard plans. The average monthly premium for stand-alone Part D plans (PDPs) with basic benefits that do not offer gap coverage is $30.14. The average monthly premium for plans that do offer some gap coverage is $63.29. In 2007, eight percent of beneficiaries enrolled in a PDP chose one with some gap coverage. Among beneficiaries in MA-PD plans, enrollment in plans offering gap coverage was 33 percent (up from 27 percent in 2006).

== Phase-out ==
Out-of-pocket cost component during gap phase-out (2015–2020)
Year	Brand-name drugs	Generic drugs
2015	45%	65%
2016	45%	58%
2017	40%	51%
2018	35%	44%
2019	30%	37%
2020	25%	25%

The Affordable Care Act (ACA), which was passed in 2010, ensured that the coverage gap or, so-called "doughnut hole", would be closing for patients on Medicare Part D. From 2017 to 2020, brand-name drug manufacturers and the federal government will be responsible for providing subsidies to patients in the doughnut hole.

In an effort to close the coverage gap, in 2010, the Affordable Care Act provided a $250 rebate check for individuals whose drug expenses took them into the doughnut hole. The United States Department of Health and Human Services began mailing rebate checks in 2010. Starting in 2011 until 2020, the coinsurance paid for prescriptions while in the coverage gap will decrease at a rate of 7% annually until beneficiaries will pay no more than 25% of the drug cost for their generic and brand name prescription purchases. For instance, a 50% mark down off brand-name medications financed by the manufacturer and a 7% markdown off generic drugs by the government was introduced in 2011 for patients in the doughnut hole. These reductions on generic drug costs will continue to incrementally rise at a rate of 7% until 2019. The following year in 2020, an extra cost reduction will be imposed at 12%, equating to a total of 75% of the generic drug cost covered. Similarly, for brand name drugs, the government will provide a subsidy at a rate of 2.5% beginning in 2013 and escalating to 25% in 2020. Thus, by 2020, Medicare Part D patients will only be responsible for paying 25% of the cost of covered generic and brand name prescription medications following payment of their deductible that year. Moreover, once patients enter the catastrophic threshold, they are only responsible for 5% of the drug cost.

As of January 1, 2020, the coverage gap has closed.
