= Medicaid Drug Rebate Program =

The Medicaid Drug Rebate Program is a program in the United States that was created by the Omnibus Budget Reconciliation Act of 1990 (OBRA'90).

The program establishes mandatory rebates that drug manufacturers must pay state Medicaid agencies related to the dispensing of outpatient prescription drugs covered by Medicaid. To participate in the program, drug manufacturers must have a National Drug Rebate Agreement with the Secretary of the Department of Health and Human Services (HHS). As of 2020, approximately 600 pharmaceutics companies participated in the Medicaid Drug Rebate Program. Rebate amounts are confidential under section 1927(b)(3)(D) of the Social Security Act.

The Medicaid Drug Rebate Program also provides for savings in other Federal health care programs. Signing the National Drug Rebate Agreement also requires drug manufacturers to enter into agreements for the 340B Drug Pricing Program as well as the Federal Supply Schedule.

== Rebate methodology ==
The Medicaid Drug Rebate Program provides for mandatory rebates on innovator drugs (e.g., brand drugs), blood clotting factors, drugs Food and Drug Administration-approved exclusively for pediatric indications, and non-innovator drugs (e.g., generic drugs). The maximum rebate is capped at 100% of the Average Manufacturer Price (AMP).

=== Innovator drugs ===
The mandatory rebate is calculated as a base rebate plus an inflationary rebate. The base rebate is the greater of 23.1% of the AMP per unit, or the difference between the AMP and the "best price," defined as the best price given to most commercial insurers. The inflationary rebate as the difference between the AMP on the launch date compared with the current quarter and the [[United States consumer price index]]-Urban.

=== Blood clotting factors and drugs FDA-approved exclusively for pediatric indications ===
The mandatory rebate is calculated as a base rebate plus an inflationary rebate. The base rebate is the greater of 17.1% of the AMP, or the difference between the AMP and the best price. The inflationary rebate, when applicable, is calculated with the same methodology as for innovator drugs.

=== Non-innovator drugs ===
The mandatory rebate is calculated as a base rebate plus an inflationary rebate. The base rebate is defined as 13% of the AMP. The inflationary rebate, when applicable, is calculated with the same methodology as for innovator drugs.

== Historical changes ==
The Medicaid Drug Rebate Program has undergone a number of changes since its inception. For example, Section 606 of the Medicare, Medicaid, and SCHIP Balanced Budget Refinement Act of 1999 (BBRA) amended Section 1927(a)(1) allowing states to have the option of different rebate effective dates. This section states that agreements to the rebate program that have been entered on or after November 29, 1999, may go into effect that day, and states option, any date after up to the first day of the quarter.

== The Medicaid Drug Rebate Program and Medicaid managed care ==
At the time the law was enacted, outpatient prescription drugs covered by Medicaid managed care organizations were excluded from access to the drug rebate program. In 1990, only 2.8 million people were enrolled in Medicaid managed care and so the savings lost by the exemption were relatively small. However, enrollment in Medicaid managed care plans has grown significantly.

The Drug Rebate Equalization Act of 2009 (DRE), introduced in the 111th United States Congress by Representative Bart Stupak as H.R. 904, and in the Senate by Senator Jeff Bingaman as S. 547, sought to equalize the treatment of prescription drug discounts between Medicaid managed care and Medicaid fee-for-service. In offering states access to rebates for drugs covered by Medicaid managed care plans, this policy was seen as a way to provide relief for federal and state budgets. The Congressional Budget Office scored the DRE as saving $11 billion over ten years. This proposal was also in President Barack Obama’s 2010 United States federal budget. The DRE passed in both the House and Senate as part of their respective comprehensive health care reform legislation, and was signed into law on March 23, 2010, by President Obama with the Patient Protection and Affordable Care Act. The DRE became effective upon enactment.
