= Community Behavioral Health =

U.S. non-profit organization

Coordinates: 39.9515°N 75.1541°W

- Abbreviation: CBH
- Founded: 1997; 28 years ago
- Type: 501(c)(3) non-profit organization
- Headquarters: Philadelphia, Pennsylvania
- CEO: Donna E.M. Bailey
- Website: cbhphilly.org

Community Behavioral Health (often initialized as CBH) is a 501(c)(3) non-profit corporation headquartered in Philadelphia, Pennsylvania. As a behavioral health Medicaid managed care organization, CBH is contracted by the city of Philadelphia to manage the delivery and payment of mental health and substance use services to Philadelphia's Medicaid recipients. It is a component of and works in tandem with the city's Department of Behavioral Health and Intellectual disAbility Services (DBHIDS).

== History and operations ==
In 1994, Pennsylvania announced plans to integrate state and federally managed health care funding for Medicaid recipients into HealthChoices, Pennsylvania’s managed care program. This led to the official establishment of CBH in February 1997, making it one of the first city-operated behavioral health managed care organizations (BH-MCO) in the United States. In 2003, CBH launched a school-based behavioral health program and in 2013 the Evidence-based Practice and Innovation Center was launched.

In 2023, over 802,250 Philadelphians were eligible for Medicaid; of these, over 100,700 used services covered by CBH. Total expenditures for those services totaled to over $860,000,000. Its 2018 budget was over $900,000,000—with additional assets totaling over $160,000,000—placing it in the top eleven Philadelphia non-profits by income. Pew Charitable Trusts notes that CBH is one of the largest contracted recipients of city funds in Philadelphia.

CBH contracts with nearly 200 Medicaid-enrolled and licensed service providers to deliver behavioral health services to enrolled members in Philadelphia. CBH authorizes payment for a continuum of behavioral health services, including outpatient mental health, substance use disorder (SUD), inpatient psychiatric hospital, residential, and telehealth treatments.

At the end of 2018, CBH extended a tobacco-free policy to all inpatient substance use treatment centers in Philadelphia. This policy raised objections from local advocates, who claimed it increased the rate of treatment drop-out.

Donna E.M. Bailey is the current CEO. She was named the permanent CEO on March 19, 2024.
