= Washington Apple Health =

Government health insurance program

Washington Apple Health is the Medicaid and State Children's Health Insurance Programs offered in the state of Washington. The program was initiated on January 1, 2014. It was preceded in 2008 by a children's health plan run by the Washington State Department of Social and Health Services (DSHS) called "Apple Health for Kids". In 2016, the plan was ordered by a Federal district court judge to include a coverage treatment with a certain drug for Hepatitis C to all 28,000 patients with the disease, not only those who qualified based on degree of liver damage. As a Medicaid program, recipients of benefits will be subject to estate recovery by the DSHS Office of Financial Recovery.
