= 340B Drug Pricing Program =

US federal government program

The 340B Drug Pricing Program is a US federal government program created in 1992 that requires drug manufacturers to provide outpatient drugs to eligible health care organizations and covered entities at significantly reduced prices. The intent of the program is to allow covered entities to "stretch scarce federal resources as far as possible, reaching more eligible patients and providing more comprehensive services." Maintaining services and lowering medication costs for patients is consistent with the purpose of the program, which is named for the section authorizing it in the Public Health Service Act (PHSA). It was enacted by Congress as part of the Veteran's Health Care Act of 1992 and codified in Section 340B of the PHSA, signed into law by President George H. W. Bush.

As of 2023, covered entities' spending on 340B outpatient drug purchases exceeds $66 billion per year, with disproportionate share hospitals accounting for nearly $52 billion.

== Program description and history ==
Congress created the Medicaid Drug Rebate Program in 1990. It required pharmaceutical manufacturers to provide rebates for medication purchases, based on sales to Medicaid beneficiaries, as a condition of having their products covered by Medicaid. The amount of the rebates paid to the states were based on a "best price" calculation that did not take into account the discounted prices that manufacturers were offering directly to Federally funded clinics and public hospitals serving large numbers of low-income and uninsured patients.

Congressional hearings in 1992 found that failing to exempt these voluntary discounts under the Medicaid Drug Rebate Program caused prices to rise "dramatically" for such facilities. According to a detailed study of the most widely used outpatient drugs at five public hospitals, hospital costs for the previously discounted drugs increased, on average, by 32 percent, far in excess of the historical five to nine percent annual increases in drug prices experienced by public hospitals. The steep rise reflected the size of the discounts previously offered, and the dramatic shift once "best prices" were imposed in place of voluntary discounts.

Consequently, Congress created the 340B program in November 1992 through the enactment of Public Law 102–585, the Veterans Health Care Act of 1992, which is codified as Section 340B of the Public Health Service Act (created under Section 602 of the Veterans Health Care Act of 1992). The law protected specified clinics and hospitals ("covered entities") from drug price increases and gave them access to price reductions. This law requires pharmaceutical manufacturers participating in the Medicaid program to enter into a second agreement with the Secretary of HHS—called a pharmaceutical pricing agreement (PPA)—under which the manufacturer agrees to provide statutorily specified discounts on "covered outpatient drugs" purchased by government-supported facilities, known as covered entities, that are expected to serve the nation's most vulnerable patient populations. These discounts only apply to purchases of covered outpatient drugs. Covered entities are allowed to dispense the discounted medication both to uninsured patients, and patients covered by Medicare or private insurance.

The number of covered entity sites ("parent" sites plus off-site outpatient facilities, also referred to as "child" sites) that take advantage of the 340B program has grown from 8,605 in 2001 to 16,572 in 2011. From 2005 to 2011, the number of hospitals participating nearly tripled, from 591 to 1,673, and the number of hospital sites (separate locations of a given hospital that all participate in 340B) almost quadrupled, from 1,233 to 4,426. As of October 2017, there are 12,722 covered entities participating in the program. The program's growth can be attributed in part to three laws that Congress passed over the last decade. Growth in the number of covered entity sites also stems from a recent federal policy change. In 2012, the Health Resources and Services Administration (HRSA) began requiring hospitals to register all offsite facilities using 340B drugs. Previously, hospitals had to register only those sites at separate addresses that received direct shipments of 340B drugs. Additionally, all clinics located off-site of the parent hospital, regardless of whether those clinics are in the same building, must register with HRSA as outpatient facilities of the parent 340B-eligible hospital if the covered entity purchases and/or provides 340B drugs to patients of those facilities. Approximately one-third of all US hospitals participate in the 340B program.

Pharmaceuticals purchased at 340B pricing now account for five percent of all medicines purchased in the United States each year. As of 2016, covered entities' spending on 340B drug purchases was estimated to be about $16.2 billion annually. In 2024, 340B spending increased to a record $66.3 billion, with disproportionate share hospitals accounting for nearly $52 billion alone.

== Administration ==
The program is administered by the Office of Pharmacy Affairs (OPA), located within the Health Resources and Services Administration (HRSA) of the Department of Health and Human Services, (HHS). OPA is charged with designing and implementing necessary policies and procedures to enforce agency objectives and assess program risk. These policies and procedures are supposed to include internal controls that provide reasonable assurance that an agency has effective and efficient operations and that program participants are in compliance with applicable laws and regulations.

== Eligibility ==
Eligibility for the 340B program is defined under federal law. Six categories of hospitals are eligible to participate in the program: disproportionate share hospitals (DSHs), children's hospitals and cancer hospitals exempt from the Medicare prospective payment system, sole community hospitals, rural referral centers, and critical access hospitals (CAH). Hospitals in each of the categories must be (1) owned or operated by or under contract with state or local government non-profit, (2) a public or private non-profit corporation that is formally granted governmental powers by a state or local government, or (3) a private non-profit hospital that has a contract with a state or local government to provide indigent care and, with the exception of CAHs, all hospitals must meet payer-mix criteria related to the Medicare DSH program. There are also ten categories of non-hospital covered entities that are eligible based on receiving federal funding. They include federally qualified health centers (FQHCs), FQHC "look-alikes", Ryan White HIV/AIDS program grantees, tuberculosis, black lung, family planning and sexually transmitted disease clinics, hemophilia treatment centers, public housing primary care clinics, homeless clinics, Urban Indian clinics, and Native Hawaiian health centers.

To participate in the 340B program covered entities must register, be enrolled, and comply with all program requirements. Once enrolled, covered entities are assigned a 340B identification number that vendors must verify before allowing an organization to purchase discounted drugs. Covered entities must complete the recertification process on the Office of Pharmacy Affairs (OPA) 340B database website every year. Failure to recertify will result in removal from the 340B program.

Two specific criteria are common to most of the 340B-eligible hospital types: the requirement for a "disproportionate share hospital (DSH) adjustment percentage" above a certain level; and the requirement that the hospital: (a) be owned or operated by a state or local government; (b) be a private nonprofit hospital "formally granted governmental powers" by a state or local government; or (c) be a private nonprofit hospital with a contract with a state or local government to provide care to low-income individuals who are not eligible for Medicare or Medicaid.

=== The Disproportionate Share Hospital (DSH) Adjustment Percentage ===
The DSH adjustment percentage determines whether hospitals receive higher cash payments from the federal government under Medicare's Inpatient Prospective Payment System. The DSH adjustment percentage was implemented as part of the Medicare program in 1986 so that hospitals with substantial low-income patient loads could get higher payments to cover the higher costs of treating low-income patients. Since then, some policymakers have viewed the DSH adjustment as a way to help hospitals with their uncompensated care. "Uncompensated care" is a general measure of hospital care provided for which no payment was received from the patient or insurer, usually in the form of charity care or bad debt. Policymakers have used the DSH adjustment percentage as an indicator of how much uncompensated care hospitals are providing patients without receiving payment.

== Impact on underserved populations ==
Research regarding the effects of the 340B Drug Pricing Program on underserved populations has yielded mixed results. Studies have found no measurable increase in uncompensated care succeeding hospital participation in the program. Hospital participation in the program has not been associated with changes in typical indicators of safety net engagement. Indicators include provision of care to low income or uninsured populations. The program has expanded substantially in scale. This has prompted ongoing debate about whether it continues to primarily benefit underserved populations as was originally designed to do.

Additional research suggests that the distribution of benefits may vary across patient populations and payer types. The growth of contract pharmacy arrangements has been associated with changes in payer specific drug coverage. This indicates that program effects may differ depending on insurance type, not uniformly directed toward underserved patients. This reveals program impact based on system structure.

Evaluation of the program’s impact is complicated as a result of limitations in available data. Federal reporting initiatives indicate that additional information collection is necessary for effective assessment of implementation and outcomes. This shows gaps in current evaluation capacity. The extent to which the program benefits underserved populations is ongoing in research and discussion.

=== Distribution of benefits ===
The distribution of benefits associated with the program has been the subject of ongoing analysis. 2026 AJMC research suggests that effects may vary across providers and patient populations. Program outcomes can differ by payer mix as variation in reimbursement rates across Medicare, Medicaid, and privately insured populations influence how financial benefits are distributed. The expansion of contract pharmacy arrangements has also been associated with payer specific drug coverage. This furthers disproportionate program effect distribution across patient groups.

Federal analysis reports show that not all covered entities provide direct discounts to low income or uninsured patients and reveal variation in how program savings are used at the provider level. Covered entities may generate revenue through reimbursement from insurers for drugs purchased at discount prices. This can further affect how benefits are distributed. There have also been analyses that describe the program as mixed and context dependent regarding whether savings are allocated or utilized across different patient and provider groups.

== Criticisms ==
=== Scope ===
The program, originally created to help safety-net hospitals provide discounted medications to low-income patients, has expanded beyond its initial purpose. The program's growth—to $124 billion in 2023, having doubled in size over five years—has raised concerns about whether it continues to serve vulnerable populations, particularly given that 70% of purchases now occur in hospital outpatient settings.

=== Financial exploitation ===
Hospitals participating in the program have been accused of generating substantial revenue by purchasing drugs at 340B discounts and reselling them at higher prices to Medicare and private insurers. The program does not require that savings be passed on to patients or used specifically for charitable care, allowing hospitals to use the funds at their discretion. As a result, many hospitals retain the financial benefits rather than providing direct discounts to patients. Hospitals may earn particularly high margins on certain drugs, including those used in oncology.

Pharmacy Benefit Managers (PBMs) have profited from the program through practices such as "spread pricing," where they charge health plans more than they reimburse pharmacies and keep the difference. Between 2017 and 2022, major PBMs reportedly earned $7.3 billion in revenue from markups on specialty generic drugs.

Contract pharmacy fees also vary by drug type and insurance status, resulting in pharmacies benefiting unevenly. The Government Accountability Office (GAO) found flat fees ranging from $6 to $15 per prescription. Some contracts also paid pharmacies a percentage of revenue generated by each prescription.

=== Lack of transparency ===
Another criticism of the program is its lack of transparency. Hospitals are not federally required to disclose how they use revenue from the 340B program, leading to concerns about whether the savings are consistently directed toward supporting low-income patients.

The Government Accountability Office (GAO) has found that HRSA lacks complete data of covered entities' contract pharmacy arrangements. This is due to its audit process reviewing only a limited sample of entities. GAO also reported that HRSA generally relies on covered entities to self attest that audit findings have been addressed, as opposed to required evidence of corrective action before all audits are closed.

=== Negative impact on patients ===
The 340B program has contributed to higher drug costs nationwide. It has been linked to increased out-of-pocket expenses for patients; in one instance, a cancer patient was billed over $2,500 for a medication that a 340B hospital had purchased at a significant discount and billed to the insurer for $22,700, despite a list price of $2,700.

Incentives within the program have been associated with more intensive prescribing and increased healthcare spending. For example, Medicare reportedly spent $4,096 more on outpatient care for breast cancer patients treated at 340B hospitals, with patients paying an average of $1,099 more in coinsurance.

Employers are estimated to incur an additional $36 billion annually in hospital spending due to the program. Large 340B hospitals have been found to charge 35% more on average for outpatient services than non-340B hospitals.

Misuse of the program by nonprofit hospitals and Pharmacy Benefit Managers (PBMs) has negatively affected small, independent pharmacies, forcing some out of business. Additionally, the program is estimated to reduce state and federal tax revenues by up to $17 billion annually, including $3.5 billion at the state and local levels.

Contract pharmacy proliferation may also affect Medicare Part D patients via premiums or preferred pharmacy access. AJMC states that increases in 340B participation have been linked to increased Medicare Part D premiums and potentially affect access to preferred pharmacies, as changes in reimbursement and network participation associated with these agreements can influence plan cost and pharmacy network design.

=== Geographic discrepancies and charity care ===
The 340B program creates financial incentives that encourage hospitals to establish clinics in higher-income, well-insured areas, where they can generate more revenue by reselling discounted drugs. Studies have found that hospitals in these areas are more likely to benefit from the program, potentially limiting its intended impact on low-income and uninsured populations. Approximately two-thirds of 340B hospital-affiliated sites located off the main campus are in higher-income neighborhoods.

In several states, most contract pharmacies associated with 340B hospitals are not located in medically underserved areas. For example, only 18% of such pharmacies in New Jersey, 24% in New York, 29% in Pennsylvania, and a majority in Georgia are situated in underserved regions.

Additionally, many participating hospitals provide below-average levels of charity care. In New Jersey, 16% of 340B hospitals fall below the national average for charity care; the figures are 86% in New York, 88% in Pennsylvania, and a large proportion in Georgia.

A 2026 AJMC study found that contract pharmacy growth has also been negatively correlated with uninsured and commercial coverage, though positively correlated with Medicaid and Medicare coverage. AJMC results also suggest that covered entities may locate contract pharmacies where the difference between insurer reimbursement and 340B discounted prices is significant.

== Expansion ==
=== Covered Entity Eligibility ===
In 1994 HRSA issued guidance clarifying which hospital outpatient facilities may use 340B drugs. The guidance said that hospital outpatient facilities whose costs are listed on a reimbursable line of the hospital's Medicare cost report(meaning their services are reimbursable under the Medicare program)are an "integral" part of the hospital and are eligible to use 340B discounted drugs. In April 2012, HRSA made clear that hospitals must improve transparency by registering all outpatient facilities using 340B drugs with OPA and list these sites on OPA's database, which led to an increase in the number of sites enrolled in 340B.

In 2003, Congress enacted a law that allowed more rural and small urban hospitals to become eligible for the program by meeting the DSH percentage threshold required for program enrollment.

In 2005, Congress expanded the program under the Deficit Reduction Act to make certain free standing children's hospitals eligible.

In 2010, the Affordable Care Act (ACA) broadened the program to cover four new types of eligible entities: outpatient settings of certain free-standing cancer hospitals, rural referral centers, sole community hospitals, and critical access hospitals.

=== Patient definition ===
Not all patients are qualified to receive outpatient prescription drugs at 340B prices. Participating hospitals are not required to provide discounted medications to patients in need. Only "outpatients" are eligible for 340B prices because the program is an outpatient program. In 1996, HRSA issued guidance for an individual to qualify as a patient of a 340B facility. Individuals are considered "patients" if:

- the covered entity has an established relationship with the individual, defined as maintaining health records of the individuals
- the individual receives a health care service for which the covered entity is responsible
- the individual receives a health care service from the covered entity consistent with qualifying grant funding or "look-a like status". Hospitals are exempt from this requirement.

In 2007, HRSA stated that "some 340B covered entities may have interpreted the definition too broadly, resulting in the potential for diversion of medications purchased under the 340B program." The GAO noted in a 2011 study that this definition of "patient" lacked clear direction and "raised concerns that the guidance may be interpreted in ways that are inconsistent with its intent" and that "covered entities could interpret it either too broadly or too narrowly."

=== Contract pharmacies ===
In 1996 HRSA guidance allowed covered entities without an in-house pharmacy to contract with a single outside pharmacy. In April 2010, HRSA allowed 340B covered entities to contract with multiple pharmacies. Between April 2010, when this change went into effect, and 2013 the number of contract pharmacies increased 700%, from 3,785 to 30,046 according to HRSA enrollment data.

== Government reports ==
There have been a number of government reports relating to the 340B program.

=== Contract Pharmacy Arrangements ===
Covered entities that participate in the 340B program may contract with pharmacies to dispense drugs purchased through the program on their behalf. Although the majority of covered entities do not use contract pharmacies, their use has increased rapidly over the past few years. Additionally, recent HRSA audits of covered entities have found program violations related to contract pharmacies. The Department of Health and Human Services Office of Inspector General conducted this study to learn about how participating covered entities operate and oversee their contract pharmacy arrangements, and what steps they may or may not take to effectively prevent diversion and duplicate discounts in contract pharmacy arrangements.

Findings: (1) Since 2010, the percentage of all covered entities that use contract pharmacies has risen from 10 percent to 22 percent. Moreover, the number of unique pharmacies serving as 340B contract pharmacies has grown by 770 percent, and the total number of contract pharmacy arrangements has grown by 1,245 percent. (2) 340B contract pharmacy arrangements create complications in preventing diversion, and covered entities are addressing these complications in different ways. The covered entities reviewed in the study reported different methods of identifying 340B eligible prescriptions to prevent diversion in their contract pharmacy arrangements. In some cases, these different methods lead to differing determinations of 340B eligibility from one covered entity to another for similar types of prescriptions. As a result, there is inconsistency within the 340B Program as to which prescriptions filled at contract pharmacies are treated as 340B eligible. (3) Contract pharmacy arrangements create complications in preventing duplicate discounts. Most covered entities in the study prevent duplicate discounts by not dispensing 340B purchased drugs to Medicaid beneficiaries through their contract pharmacies. However, some covered entities that do dispense 340B purchased drugs to Medicaid beneficiaries through their contract pharmacies did not report a method to avoid duplicate discounts. (4) Some covered entities in the study do not offer the discounted 340B price to uninsured patients in their contract pharmacy arrangements. (5) Most covered entities in the study do not conduct all of the oversight activities recommended by HRSA. Although almost all covered entities reported monitoring their contract pharmacy arrangements, the extent of such monitoring varies. Few covered entities reported retaining independent auditors for their contract pharmacy arrangements as recommended in HRSA guidance.

=== Manufacturer Discounts Offer Benefits, but Federal Oversight Needs Improvement ===
We examined (1) the extent to which covered entities generate 340B revenue, factors that affect revenue generation, and how they use the program; (2) how manufacturers' distribution of drugs at 340B prices affects covered entities' or non-340B providers' access to drugs; and (3) HRSA's oversight of the 340B program.

Findings: Thirteen of the 29 covered entities GAO interviewed reported that they generated 340B program revenue that exceeded drug-related costs, which includes the costs of purchasing and dispensing drugs. Of those remaining, 10 did not generate enough revenue to exceed drug-related costs, and six did not report enough information for GAO to determine the extent to which revenue was generated. Several factors affected 340B revenue generation, including drug reimbursement rates. Regardless of the amount of revenue generated, all covered entities reported using the program in ways consistent with its purpose. For example, all covered entities reported that program participation allowed them to maintain services and lower medication costs for patients. Entities generating 340B program revenue that exceeded drug-related costs were also able to serve more patients and to provide additional services.

According to 340B program stakeholders that GAO interviewed, manufacturers' distribution of drugs at 340B prices generally did not affect providers' access to drugs. However, 340B stakeholders reported issues with covered entities accessing intravenous immune globulin (IVIG) at 340B prices. Stakeholders reported that manufacturers restricted the distribution of the drug at 340B prices, resulting in 340B hospitals having to purchase at higher prices to meet their demand. These restrictions happen on an ongoing basis because the IVIG is susceptible to drug shortages.

GAO said that HRSA's oversight of the 340B program is inadequate to provide reasonable assurance that covered entities and drug manufacturers are in compliance with program requirements—such as, entities' transfer of drugs purchased at 340B prices only to eligible patients, and manufacturers' sale of drugs to covered entities at or below the 340B price. GAO said HRSA primarily relies on participant self-policing to ensure program compliance. However, GAO continued, HRSA's guidance on program requirements often lacks the necessary level of specificity to provide clear direction, making participants' ability to self-police difficult and raising concerns that the guidance may be interpreted in ways inconsistent with the agency's intent. Other than relying on self-policing, HRSA engages in few activities to oversee the 340B program, GAO said. Moreover, GAO said the 340B program has increasingly been used in settings, such as hospitals, where the risk of improper purchase of 340B drugs is greater, in part because they serve both 340B and non-340B eligible patients. The 2010 changes allowing unlimited outside contract pharmacies to distribute 340B discounted medications were also seen by GAO as a specific source of heightened concern for HRSA's inadequate oversight. To ensure appropriate use of the 340B program, GAO recommended that HRSA take steps to strengthen oversight regarding program participation and compliance with program.

Recommendations (1) HRSA was instructed to conduct selective audits of 340B covered entities to deter potential diversion. HRSA began conducting such audits in 2012. In FY2012, HRSA completed 51 audits of 340B covered entities, the reports of which are available on the HRSA website. (2) HRSA was instructed to finalize new, more specific guidance on the definition of a 340B patient. HRSA reportedly is studying the matter. (3) HRSA should be instructed to further specify its 340B nondiscrimination guidance for cases in which distribution of drugs is restricted and to require reviews of manufacturers' plans to restrict distribution of drugs at 340B prices. HRSA has issued guidance on these issues. (4) HRSA should be instructed to further specify the criteria that hospitals that are not publicly owned or operated must meet to be eligible for the 340B program. Since then HRSA has issued guidance on this issue (Release No. 2013-3).

=== State Medicaid Policies and Oversight Activities ===
Objective: To describe state Medicaid agencies' policies and oversight activities related to drugs purchased under 340B.

Findings: (1) Approximately half of states have written 340B policies that direct covered entities to bill Medicaid at cost for 340B-purchased drugs. (2) States do not have necessary pricing information to create prepay edits for 340B-purchased drugs; 20 States conduct post-pay reviews to identify overpayments. (3) Over half of states developed alternatives to OPA's Medicaid Exclusion File to identify 340B claims and prevent duplicate discounts.

Recommendations: (1) The Centers for Medicare & Medicaid Services (CMS) should direct states to create written 340B policies. (2) CMS should inform States about tools they can use to identify claims for 340B-purchased drugs. (3) HRSA should share 340B ceiling prices with states. (4) HRSA, in conjunction with CMS, should improve the accuracy of the Medicaid Exclusion File.

Review of 340B Prices

Objective: To determine whether 340B covered entities pay more than the statutory defined 340B ceiling price and, if so, the potential reason for the price discrepancies.

Findings: (1) In June 2005, 14 percent of total purchases by 340B entities exceeded 340B ceiling prices, resulting in total overpayments of $3.9 million. (2) The largest overpayments were due to prices that did not follow HRSA's "penny price" policy in situations to which the statutory 340B ceiling price calculation yielded a negative number. (3) Low-volume entities, manufacturers, and wholesalers were associated with higher rates of overpayments. (4) Inaccuracies in HRSA's ceiling prices limit HRSA's ability to monitor 340B program compliance. Recommendations: (1) HRSA should improve its oversight of the 340B program to ensure that entities are charged at or below the 340B ceiling price. (2) HRSA should provide technical assistance regarding 340B program implementation to all participating entities, manufacturers, and wholesalers. (3) HRSA should publish guidelines regarding its penny price policy. (4) To accurately calculate 340B ceiling prices, HRSA should obtain data on consistent unit of measure and package size.

=== Pharmaceutical Manufacturers Overcharged 340B-Covered Entities ===
Objective: To determine (1) whether five manufacturers of 11 prescription drugs sold them to 340B covered entities using the correct Medicaid rebate amount; and (2) the extent of any overcharges.

Findings: The five manufacturers overcharged 340B covered entities an estimated $6.1 million for sales during the one-year period ending on September 30, 1999.

Recommendations: HRSA should require the five drug manufacturers identify the exact amounts of the overcharges for each of the affected 340B- covered entities and apply the overcharged amounts as offsets or credits to each entities future purchases.

== Other reports ==
=== Analysis of 340B DSH Hospital Services Delivered to Vulnerable Patient Populations ===
A 2015 study commissioned by 340b Health, a coalition of hospitals receiving 340b drug discounts, concluded that hospitals in the 340B drug pricing program care for nearly twice as many poor patients as other hospitals and also shoulder a much higher burden of uncompensated care.

The study, conducted by the healthcare economics and policy consulting firm Dobson DaVanzo & Associates, set out to determine the extent to which disproportionate share (DSH) hospitals enrolled in the 340B drug pricing program focus their services on vulnerable patient populations. The study found that:

- 340B DSH hospitals provide nearly twice as much care as non-340B hospitals – 41.9 percent versus 22.8 percent – to Medicaid beneficiaries and low-income Medicare patients.
- 340B hospitals provide 40 percent more uncompensated care as a percent of total patient care costs than non-340B hospitals – $24.6 billion to $17.5 billion. Although 340B hospitals accounted for only 35 percent of all hospitals included in the analysis, 340B hospitals provided 58 percent of all uncompensated care. In addition, when taking hospital size into account and looking at uncompensated care as a percent of total patient care costs, 340B hospitals across all hospital sizes provided consistently high levels of uncompensated care.
- A higher percentage of 340B DSH hospitals provide public health and specialized services – many of which are unprofitable but essential to their communities – than non-340B hospitals.

=== Outpatient Prescription Dispensing Patterns Through Contract Pharmacies In 2012 ===
A study published in the November 2014 edition of Health Affairs provided the first comparison of 340B prescriptions and all prescriptions dispensed by retail pharmacies operating under contracts with 340B covered entities. The study used 2012 data from Walgreens, the national leader in 340B contract pharmacies. The study found that:

- Medications used to treat chronic conditions such as diabetes, high cholesterol levels, asthma, and depression accounted for an overwhelming majority of all prescriptions dispensed at Walgreens as part of the 340B program.
- A higher percentage of anti-retrovirals used to treat HIV/AIDS were dispensed through 340B prescriptions than through all prescriptions dispensed at Walgreens.
- The majority of 340B prescriptions dispensed at Walgreens originated at tuberculosis clinics, consolidated health centers, disproportionate-share hospitals, and Ryan White clinics.
- 340B contract pharmacies dispense medications used to treat Americans' chronic disease burden and disproportionately dispense medications used by key vulnerable populations targeted by the program.

=== Federal Drug Discount Program Critical for Oregon's Health ===
A study commissioned by the Oregon Primary Care Association concluded that the 340B program is vital to helping health providers in Oregon better treat the vulnerable and underserved.'

Specifically, the report found that 340B savings allow federally qualified health centers in the state to provide:

- financial assistance to patients unable to afford their prescriptions
- clinical pharmacy services, such as disease management programs or medication therapy management
- additional clinics
- community outreach programs

"FQHCs rely on the 340B funding to offset the costs of providing these and other important (yet unreimbursed) services. And as safety-net community providers, FQHCs use the funding to benefit all patients of the community, indirectly passing savings to the state as a whole," said the report which was commissioned by the Oregon Primary Care Association.

Oregon is weighing whether to require these health centers to hand over essentially all of their savings on 340B drugs provided to Medicaid beneficiaries.

"Policies that shift cost savings to the state may not actually be effective and could adversely impact patient care," the study concluded.

=== Unfulfilled Expectations: An analysis of charity care provided by 340B hospitals ===
A new analysis published in 2014 indicates that a substantial portion of hospitals enrolled in the 340B program provide only a minimal amount of charity care; as such, they may not be fulfilling Congress' expectations.

The study, compiled from newly available public data noted that the 340B drug discount program was designed by Congress to help safety net providers improve access to prescription medicines for uninsured, vulnerable patients in the outpatient hospital setting. Yet, the analysis shows, most hospitals that benefit from the program provide less charity care than the national average for all hospitals, and charity care in about a quarter of all 340B hospitals represents 1% or less of total patient costs. A small number of 340B hospitals provide the lion's share of all charity care delivered by 340B hospitals.

The analysis raises questions about whether the current 340B eligibility criteria specifically used for DSH hospitals are serving the spirit and intent of the law in that they may be overly broad and not just target those entities that serve high numbers of vulnerable, uninsured patients. Specifically, the new research shows:

- More than two-thirds of hospitals that receive 340B drug discounts provide less charity care as a percent of patient costs than the national average for all hospitals, including for-profit hospitals which do not qualify for 340B under current eligibility criteria.
- For approximately a quarter (24%) of 340B hospitals, charity care represents 1% or less of the hospitals' total patient costs.
- Approximately one-fifth (22%) of 340B hospitals provide 80% of all charity care delivered by 340B DSH hospitals.

Currently, hospitals that qualify for the program claim 340B discounts for most outpatient prescription drugs, for both insured and uninsured patients. And while the 340B program lowers outpatient drug costs for qualifying hospitals on the presumption that it will help significant numbers of vulnerable, uninsured patients, participating hospitals currently see no restrictions on the way they spend the revenue generated if they charge both insured and uninsured patients higher prices than the 340B-discounted price.

This stands in contrast to many other covered entities that participate in the 340B program as a result of a specific grant (often referred to as "grantees") from the US Department of Health and Human Services. The grant-approval process typically requires these providers to demonstrate that they provide services to certain specified vulnerable populations, at times based upon the patients' "ability to pay", and that the entities reinvest resources into services for those populations.

According to the report, overly-broad eligibility criteria for hospitals have led to an explosion in the number of hospitals that have come into the 340B program. Today, one-third of all hospitals in the country participate in the 340B program and get 340B discounts; that number is expected to grow, particularly absent an effort to tighten eligibility requirements. Drug purchases through the 340B program will almost double, from $6 billion in 2010 to $13.4 billion by 2016, though little of the billions of dollars in discounts has been directly tracked to or linked with charity care for vulnerable indigent patients.

While not disputing the report's findings, Safety Net Hospitals for Pharmaceutical Access (SNHPA), the main group that lobbies on behalf of the hospitals studied in the report, issued a statement in response to the report stating:

In its continued public relations campaign to discredit the 340B drug discount program, the pharmaceutical industry has financed another study that intentionally misrepresents its purpose. This report goes a step further by suggesting that many hospitals don't deserve to be in the program based on a narrow and misleading interpretation of care to needy patients.

- The 340B program has lived up to congressional expectations, which is why Congress chose to add several new categories of hospitals to its ranks under both Republican and Democratic administrations.
- Congress was clear when it established the program that eligible hospitals must serve a disproportionately high percentage of Medicaid patients, low-income seniors or be located in remote rural areas. Congress allows these hospitals to advance the real purpose of the program: to stretch their limited resources so that they are less dependent on taxpayers dollars.
- The report is based on unreliable estimates of charity care that even the government refuses to use to determine uncompensated hospital expenses. In addition, hospitals are significantly underpaid by Medicaid, a fact completely omitted from the analysis.
- The average 340B hospital provides three times more uncompensated care than non-340B hospitals.
- Private oncology practices refer their Medicare, Medicaid and uninsured patients to hospitals.
- The 340B program represents only 2 percent of the $325 billion US pharmaceutical market.

Another lobbying group, the American Hospital Association issued a statement in response to the report stating:

The AHA today said a report examining the charity care levels of 340B hospitals "ignores the fact that the 340B program enables hospitals to provide essential health care services to the nation's most vulnerable populations." The Alliance for Integrity and Reform of 340B report found that some hospitals enrolled in the 340B Drug Pricing Program provided only a minimal amount of charity care. However, AHA Senior Vice President for Public Policy Analysis and Development Linda Fishman noted that the report is "based on Medicare's worksheet S-10, which is still in the development stages and judged by Medicare policymakers to be not yet ready for use in payment calculations." Fishman also said that 62% of all uncompensated care provided by U.S. hospitals is provided by 340B hospitals, and "charity care alone does not account for the myriad programs and services that hospitals provide, which are tailored to the needs of their own unique community."

=== RAND Corporation 2011 Study ===
In 2011 the RAND Corporation published a study of policy options for addressing medicare payment differentials across ambulatory settings. sponsored by the Assistant Secretary of Planning and Evaluation in the US Department of Health and Human Services that analyzed potential options for modifying Medicare payment policies to improve the value of services provided in ambulatory settings by addressing the differential in the amount that Medicare pays for similar facility services in various ambulatory settings. In their summary the authors verify that "The findings confirm that payments tend to be highest for services provided in hospitals, but they also indicate that payment differentials generally exceed cost differentials and vary by procedure."

Page 55 of the RAND Study states:

There has been a substantial increase in hospital purchases of provider practices in recent years, largely to expand the hospital's referral base and to position the hospital system as an accountable care organization. However, the consequences are increased Medicare payments and beneficiary coinsurance, as well as additional competition for community-based practices...For oncology practices, one reason cited for the growth is the opportunity to expand the patient base for drugs purchased under the 340B discount drug purchase plan. The program allows facilities to purchase outpatient drugs at prices below market. Because the [Outpatient Prospective Payment System] payment rates for drugs furnished to hospital outpatients are the same for all hospitals without regard to whether the drugs were purchased through the 340B program, hospitals have an incentive to increase margins by expanding their patient base for chemotherapy administration. At the same time, changes in Medicare payments for chemotherapy drugs furnished in [physician offices] have limited the ability of oncologists to profit on these drugs and have increased the attractiveness of affiliating with a hospital.

The Oncology Business Review published a similar report in September 2011. The authors of that piece found that the acquisition of community oncology practices by hospitals with 340B pricing is leading to more cancer patients being treated by hospitals rather than in specialized community practices, reversing a 20-year trend.

In 2008, the Centers for Medicare & Medicaid Services solicited public comment on whether it should adjust Outpatient Prospective Payment System (OPPS) payments to hospitals for separately payable drugs based on hospitals' participation in the 340B program. After receiving and reviewing comments, it decided not to make any changes.

=== Charlotte News Observer April 2012 Series: "Prognosis: Profits" and Subsequent Congressional Investigation ===
In April 2012 the Charlotte Observer and The News & Observer of Raleigh, North Carolina, published a five-part series under the headline "Nonprofit hospitals thrive on profits".

In response to those stories Senator Chuck Grassley (R-Iowa), former Chairman of the Senate Finance Committee and current ranking Republican on the Senate Judiciary Committee initiated a series of letters to the hospitals identified in the series to investigate whether the 340B program is functioning as intended. In a September 28, 2012 letter to the Carolinas Medical Center Senator Grassley stated: "The intent and design of the [340B] program is to help lower outpatient drug prices for the uninsured. It is not intended to subsidize covered entities for providing inpatient services to those who are covered by private insurance, Medicare, or Medicaid. As such, I have been examining the 340B program."

=== Safety Net Hospitals for Pharmaceutical Access (SNHPA) Report ===
"Setting the Record Straight on 340B: A Response to Critics," was released on July 9, 2013, by Safety Net Hospitals for Pharmaceutical Access (SNHPA), a 501(c)(6) non-profit organization of 1,000 public and private non-profit hospitals and health systems throughout the US that participate in the Public Health Service 340B drug discount program. The report, which includes documented independent research funded by SNHPA, describes the program and provides examples of how some providers are using their savings. It also argues the program is saving money for federal, state, and local governments and taxpayers and attempts to refute many of the statements made by critics of the program.

The report calls for a number of reforms to modernize the program, including more pricing transparency to ensure that health care providers are not being overcharged, audits of drug manufacturers, as well as a look at the use of contract pharmacies to determine whether the program is helping vulnerable patients better access prescription medications and pharmacy care. As part of its advocacy SNHPA also assists its members maximize the benefits of the 340B program.

Senator Charles Grassley (R-Iowa), a leader in the Senate investigating the operations of the 340B report responded to the SNHPA report by stating: "A report by an association representing the affected hospitals is not objective. Through my inquiries, I've been able to document that several hospitals are profiting from the 340B program rather than simply providing discounted drugs to the uninsured. Instead of using the deeply discounted drugs these hospitals receive for the most vulnerable in need, the hospitals are up-selling those drugs to patients with Medicare and private insurance because those patients can pay more. The hospitals are keeping the difference."

Third Way: As the ACA Stands Up, Can Programs for the Uninsured Stand Down?

Given the uncertainty facing safety net hospitals, no one is proposing to end programs like disproportionate share and 340B. In fact, it is very likely that some version of these programs will be needed for the foreseeable future because, under the best-case scenario, the ACA will still leave millions without adequate coverage. But the Administration has an opportunity to bolster the oversight of programs like 340B to ensure the most vulnerable are protected and no one is abusing the program. That will make it easier when the time comes to recalibrate safety net programs for a level of services appropriate to the number of remaining uninsured.

== Legislative oversight ==
=== Limitations in data collection ===
Federal agencies indicated that structured data collection is necessary to assess implementation and effectiveness, emphasizing the role of standardized reporting to support oversight activity. Reporting initiatives have been proposed to evaluate capacity through systematic data collection.

The need for additional data collection has been used as evidence of limitations in current oversight. Reporting has been described to be dependent on newly developed systems, as opposed to comprehensive and established datasets. This may constrain the ability to assess performance and outcomes and is a large part of ongoing discussion regarding current oversight mechanisms.

Program expansion has also increased the complexity of administration and oversight. Growing participation and scale has been associated with broader discussion surrounding policy and appropriate regulatory approaches. The expansion of contract pharmacy arrangements has increased administrative layers, which complicate oversight across care settings and payer types.

=== Legislative activity ===
- A September 2005 letter from Sen. Charles Grassley (R-IA) to HRSA asked for an accounting of what the government had done to recover overcharges of 340B covered entities by Aventis, Bristol-Myers Squibb, GlaxoSmithKline, and TAP Pharmaceuticals reported by OIG in 2003 and 2004.
- December 2005 House hearing on Oversight and Administration of the 340B Drug Discount Program: Improving Efficiency and Transparency* September 2012 letter from Sen. Charles Grassley (R-IA) to Carolinas Medical Center inquiring into participation in the 340B program.
- September 2011 from House and Senate members to HRSA requesting information on oversight and effectiveness of the 340B program.
- July 2012 letter from House members to HRSA requesting an updated definition of 340B "patient."
- September 2012 letter from Sen. Charles Grassley (R-IA) to Carolinas Medical Center inquiring into participation in the 340B program.
- January 2013 Senate letter to HRSA seeking details on 340B program oversight.
- May 8, 2013 News Release by Sen. Charles Grassley, "Questions Continue About 340B Discount Drug Program"
- June 18, 2013 News Release by Sen. Charles Grassley, "Discount Drug Program, Hospital Executive Bonuses"
- July 9, 2013 News Release by Sen. Charles Grassley, "Grassley on Hospital Industry Report on Discount Drug Program: A report by an association representing the affected hospitals is not objective"
- September 26, 2013 letters by Sen. Charles Grassley, "Grassley Seeks Answers from Drug Companies on Providing Required Discounts"

== 340B and Medicaid ==
State Medicaid programs must administer their coverage of prescription outpatient drugs in a manner that accounts for participation in the 340B Drug Pricing Program. Typically, state Medicaid programs obtain rebates for dispensed outpatient prescription drugs through the Medicaid Drug Rebate Program. However, duplicate discounts are prohibited. Therefore, state Medicaid programs cannot obtain rebates on drugs that were acquired through the 340B Drug Pricing Program.
