= Medicare dual eligible =

Dual qualification in Medicare and Medicaid

Dual-eligible beneficiaries (Medicare dual eligibles or "duals") refers to those qualifying for both Medicare and Medicaid benefits. In the United States, approximately 9.2 million people are eligible for "dual" status. Dual-eligibles make up 14% of Medicaid enrollment, yet they are responsible for approximately 36% of Medicaid expenditures. Similarly, duals total 20% of Medicare enrollment, and spend 31% of Medicare dollars. Dual-eligibles are often in poorer health and require more care compared with other Medicare and Medicaid beneficiaries.

== Medicare and Medicaid coverage for dual-eligibles ==
Medicare is the primary payer for most services, but Medicaid covers benefits not offered by Medicare. Medicare coverage for dual-eligibles includes hospitalizations, physician services, prescription drugs, skilled nursing facility care, home health visits, and hospice care. Under Medicaid, states are required to cover certain items and services for dual-eligibles, including long-term nursing facility services and home health services. Although states are required to cover certain populations and services, they have the option to expand coverage beyond these mandatory levels (i.e., offer home and community-based services), and accordingly state Medicaid programs vary in scope. Dual-eligibles may be categorized as full-benefit or partial-benefit. Those with full benefits may receive the entire range of Medicaid benefits; those with partial-benefits do not receive Medicaid-covered services, but Medicaid covers their Medicare premiums or cost-sharing, or both. Partial benefit dual-eligible beneficiaries have limited income and assets, but their income and assets are not low enough to qualify them for full Medicaid benefits in their state.

== Change in prescription drug coverage for dual-eligibles ==
With the advent of the Medicare Prescription Drug, Improvement, and Modernization Act of 2003, these dual eligibles have automatically been enrolled to a random Medicare Part D plan, effective January 1 of 2006. As a result of this auto assignment, participants who were already enrolled in a Medicare Advantage HMO, may have been automatically disenrolled from their medical plan to allow for part D enrollment. Medicaid will still cover drugs for dual-eligible patients that are not covered by Medicare Part D, including certain controlled substances.

== Efforts to integrate Medicare and Medicaid benefits ==
Dual-eligibles typically receive their Medicare and Medicaid benefits through each program separately. For Medicare benefits, beneficiaries may opt to enroll in Medicare's traditional fee-for-service (FFS) program or in a private Medicare Advantage (MA) plan (Medicare Part C), which is administered by a Managed Care Organization (MCO), under contract with the Centers for Medicare & Medicaid Services (CMS), the agency in the Department of Health and Human Services that administers the Medicare program and oversees state Medicaid programs. In addition, dual-eligibles may choose a type of MA plan called a dual-eligible special needs plan (D-SNP), which is designed to target the needs of this population. For Medicaid benefits, beneficiaries generally enroll in their state's Medicaid FFS program or a Medicaid managed care plan administered by an MCO under contract with the state.

Recently, Congress and CMS have placed greater emphasis on the coordination and integration of Medicare and Medicaid benefits for dual-eligible beneficiaries. For example, the Medicare Improvements for Patients and Providers Act of 2008 required D-SNPs to contract with state Medicaid agencies to provide Medicaid benefits. More recently, the Affordable Care Act (ACA) established a type of D-SNP, referred to as a Fully Integrated Dual Eligible (FIDE) SNP, which—unlike other D-SNPs—is designed to integrate program benefits for dual-eligible beneficiaries through a single managed care organization, although payment is generally provided separately by each program. In 2011, CMS announced a financial alignment demonstration that is intended to further integrate the programs' services. CMS expects that the demonstration will decrease incentives for cost shifting and increase care coordination, resulting in improved care for beneficiaries and savings to Medicare and Medicaid. CMS projects that approximately 61 to 75 percent of savings will come from reductions in costly Medicare-covered services.

== Historical challenges with the dually-eligible ==
Historically, one of the major challenges for the dually-eligible has been care coordination between Medicare and Medicaid. These two systems of care do not "talk to each other" systematically, so one physician that bills primarily through Medicare may not be familiar with benefits that are available through Medicaid. Additionally, since Medicaid benefits vary by state, it is difficult for care providers and consumers to understand the complexity that is inherent within the Medicaid system.

Because duals tend to be the most vulnerable, and often sickest, adults, their care has historically been expensive, totaling $319.5 billion in 2011. One proposed reason for this significant cost would be that many Medicaid programs, prior to the 2010 passage of the Affordable Care Act (ACA) used a fee-for-service model. Fee-for-service models are typically more costly because they allow providers to charge for the quantity of care they provide, rather than the quality.

In order to resolve these pain points, the ACA includes provisions that specifically address the coverage and care of duals. On a federal level, the Centers for Medicare and Medicaid Services (CMS) has established two new offices: The Federal Coordinated Health Care Office (FCHCO aka the "duals office") as well as the Center for Medicare and Medicaid Innovation (CMMI) in order to both strategize and monitor the type and quality of care afforded to duals. These offices focus on both monetary expenses as well as care innovation and quality for dual eligible beneficiaries.

== Research ==
A study by the Government Accountability Office (GAO) found that the integration of Medicare and Medicaid benefits generally improves the care provided to dual-eligibles but does not lead to Medicare savings or a reduction in costly Medicare services (i.e., emergency room visits, hospital admissions, and 30-day risk-adjusted all-cause readmissions). Medicare Advantage health plans that fully integrated Medicare and Medicaid benefits for dual-eligibles (i.e., FIDE-SNPs) generally had better quality of care scores (particularly for intermediate outcome measures) relative to plans with less integration of benefits. However, only FIDE-SNPs that operated in states with long-standing integration programs performed well on quality of care scores. While the care provided generally improved for dual-eligibles enrolled in FIDE-SNPs, very few of these plans reported lower estimated Medicare costs relative to what Medicare's fee-for-service program would have spent for beneficiaries with the same demographic and health characteristics. Furthermore, the FIDE-SNPs that reported potential Medicare savings generally did not demonstrate lower costs than other D-SNPs in the same geographic areas. These results were consistent for dual-eligibles both under the age of 65 and those age 65 and over. While operating specialized plans and integrating benefits could lead to improved care, GAO's results suggest that these conditions have not demonstrated a reduction in dual-eligible beneficiaries' Medicare spending compared with Medicare spending in settings without integrated benefits. Because the GAO study also found that the average number of costly Medicare services increases as the number of chronic and mental health conditions increase, it is possible that savings were not demonstrated because the population being served by FIDE-SNPs is too large to be cost-effective and major complications were averted for relatively few beneficiaries.

A study looking at physician's views of Medicare Part D, and in particular how it pertains to dual-eligibles, found that many physicians expressed concern regarding access to prescription drugs, especially for dual-eligibles. Almost half of physicians responded that the access to prescription drugs for dual-eligibles was worse under Part D than relative to the previous Medicaid, and more than half (63%) reported higher administration burden. Many physicians stated that dual-eligibles had less access under Part D than in three Medicaid restrictive states. This suggests that the transparency of Part D formulary coverage needs to be improved to improve access to these resources for physicians.

A further study by the same group of researchers found that despite the above physicians' views on access to healthcare among dual-eligibles, there were no statistically significant changes in pharmaceutical utilization or out-of-pocket expenditures in the 18 months after Medicare Part D implementation. When comparing a group of dual-eligibles (the experimental group) with a control group of near-elderly Medicaid-covered patients, both groups showed a decline in costs rights after the implementation of Part D, which then leveled off. The expenditures for both groups tracked each other.
