= Special needs plan =

US healthcare plan

A special needs plan (or SNP, often pronounced "snip") is a category of the US Medicare Advantage plan designed to attract and enroll Medicare beneficiaries who fall into a certain special needs demographic. There are two types of SNPs. The exclusive SNP enrolls only those beneficiaries who fall into the special needs demographic. The other type is the disproportionate share SNP. "Disproportionate share" SNPs enroll a greater percentage of the target special needs population as compared to a national percentage of the target population. Under the federal Medicare Prescription Drug, Improvement, and Modernization Act of 2003, Congress identified special needs individuals" as (1) institutionalized, or (2) dually eligible, or (3) individuals with severe or disabling chronic conditions. More specifically, special needs individuals include:

- Institutionalized beneficiaries, defined as those who reside or are expected to reside for 90 days or longer in a long-term care facility (defined as either: skilled nursing facility (SNF)/NF, ICF or inpatient psychiatric facility), or those living in the community but requiring an equivalent level of care to those residing in a long-term care facility.
- Dually eligible beneficiaries, defined as individuals who are entitled to Medicare Part A and/or Part B and are eligible for some form of Medicaid benefit.
- Beneficiaries with chronic conditions, defined as individuals who have acquired one or more disabling chronic conditions, including, but not limited to: cardiovascular disease, diabetes, congestive heart failure, osteoarthritis, mental disorders, ESRD, and HIV/AIDS.
