= Health Insurance Premium Payment Program =

Medicaid program

The Health Insurance Premium Payment Program (HIPP) is a Medicaid program that allows a recipient to receive free private health insurance paid for entirely by their state's Medicaid program. A Medicaid recipient must be deemed 'cost effective' by the HIPP program of their state. Ultimately, the program was made optional, and its use is minimal. The Omnibus Budget Reconciliation Act of 1990 (OBRA-90) authorized states to implement an HIPP program. HIPP is for families who have at least one person who gets Medicaid and can get private insurance through a family member's work.

As of 2008, relatively few states had premium assistance programs, and enrollment was relatively low. Interest in this approach remained high, however. In some states the HIPP program has been institutionalized by non profit organizations to assist Medicaid recipients with the difficult task of getting into the HIPP program.

== See also ==
- Health insurance in the United States
