= Omnibus Budget Reconciliation Act of 1993 =

United States tax legislation

Omnibus Budget Reconciliation Act
- Long title: An Act to provide for reconciliation pursuant to section 7 of the concurrent resolution on the budget for fiscal year 1994.
- Acronyms (colloquial): OBRA-93
- Nicknames: Deficit Reduction Act of 1993, Revenue Reconciliation Act of 1993
- Enacted by: the 103rd United States Congress
- Effective: August 10, 1993

Citations
- Public law: 103-66
- Statutes at Large: 107 Stat. 312 through 685 Stat. 1025 (374 pages)

Legislative history
- Introduced in the House as the "Omnibus Budget Reconciliation Act of 1993" (H.R. 2264) by Martin Olav Sabo (D–MN) on May 25, 1993; Committee consideration by Budget; Passed the House on May 27, 1993 (219-213); Passed the Senate on June 25, 1993 (50–49) with amendment; House agreed to Senate amendment on August 5, 1993 (218-216) with further amendment; Senate agreed to House amendment on August 6, 1993 (51-50); Signed into law by President Bill Clinton on August 10, 1993

The Omnibus Budget Reconciliation Act of 1993 (or OBRA-93) was a federal law that was enacted by the 103rd United States Congress and signed into law by President Bill Clinton on August 10, 1993. It has also been unofficially referred to as the Deficit Reduction Act of 1993. Part XIII of the law is also called the Revenue Reconciliation Act of 1993.

The bill stemmed from a budget proposal made by Clinton in February 1993; he sought a mix of tax increases and spending reductions that would cut the deficit in half by 1997. Though every congressional Republican voted against the bill, it passed by narrow margins in both the House of Representatives and the Senate. The act increased the top federal income tax rate from 31% to 39.6%, increased the corporate income tax rate, raised fuel taxes, and raised various other taxes. The bill also included $255 billion in spending cuts over a five-year period. In 1998, the effects of the bill helped the US federal government to experience its first budget surplus since the 1960s.

== Provisions ==
- Previously, the top individual tax rate of 31% applied to all income over $51,900. The Act created a new bracket of 36% for income above $115,000 and 39.6% for income above $250,000.
- Previously, corporate income above $335,000 was taxed at 34%. The Act created new brackets of 35% for income from $10 million to $15 million, 38% for income from $15 million to $18.33 million, and 35% for income above $18.33 million.
- The 2.9% Medicare tax had previously been capped to apply to the first $135,000 of income. The cap was removed.
- Transportation fuels taxes were raised by 4.3 cents per gallon.
- The portion of Social Security benefits subject to income taxes was raised from 50% to 85%.
- The phaseout of the personal exemption and the limit on itemized deductions were permanently extended.
- The AMT tax rate was increased from 24% to tiered rates of 26% and 28%.
- Part IV Section 14131: Expansion of the Earned Income Tax Credit and added inflation adjustments.
- $255 billion in spending cuts over a five-year period; much of the cuts affected Medicare or the military.
- Required states to implement Medicaid estate recovery programs to recover costs associated with Medicaid benefits.

== Legislative history ==
Clinton inherited major budget deficits left over from the Reagan and Bush administrations; fiscal year 1992 had seen a $290 billion deficit. In order to cut the deficit, Bentsen, Panetta, and Rubin urged Clinton to pursue both tax increases and spending cuts. They argued that by taming the deficit, Clinton would encourage Federal Reserve Chairman Alan Greenspan to lower interest rates, which, along with increased confidence among investors, would lead to an economic boom. Some of Clinton's advisers also believed that a focus on cutting the deficit would be politically beneficial since it would potentially help Democrats shed their supposed "tax and spend" reputation. Though Secretary of Labor Robert Reich argued that stagnant earnings represented a bigger economic issue than the deficits, Clinton decided to pursue deficit reduction as the major economic priority of his first year in office. In doing so, he reluctantly abandoned a middle class tax cut that he had championed during the campaign.

Clinton presented his budget plan to Congress in February 1993, proposing a mix of tax increases and spending reductions that would cut the deficit in half by 1997. Republican leaders strongly opposed any tax increase and pressured congressional Republicans to unite in opposition to Clinton's budget, and not a single Republican would vote in favor of Clinton's proposed bill. Senate Democrats eliminated the implementation of a new energy tax in favor of an increase in the gasoline tax, but Clinton successfully resisted efforts to defeat his proposed expansion of the earned income tax credit.

Ultimately every Republican in Congress voted against the bill, as did a number of Democrats. Vice President Al Gore broke a tie in the Senate on both the Senate bill and the conference report. The House bill passed 219–213 on Thursday, May 27, 1993. The House passed the conference report on Thursday, August 5, 1993, by a vote of 218 to 216 (217 Democrats and 1 independent (Bernie Sanders (I-VT)) voting in favor; 41 Democrats and 175 Republicans voting against). The Senate passed the conference report on the last day before their month's vacation, on Friday, August 6, 1993, by a vote of 51 to 50 (50 Democrats plus Vice President Gore voting in favor, 6 Democrats (Frank Lautenberg (D-NJ), Richard Bryan (D-NV), Sam Nunn (D-GA), Bennett Johnston Jr. (D-LA), David L. Boren (D-OK), and Richard Shelby (D-AL, later R-AL) and 44 Republicans voting against). President Clinton signed the bill on August 10, 1993.

The government was able to raise additional revenue, which helped to balance the budget and, by the end of the 1990s, began to reduce privately held public debt.

== Alternatives ==
Some alternatives to the bill included a proposal by Senator David Boren (D-OK), which would have kept much of the tax increase on upper-income payers but eliminated all energy tax increases and scaled back the Earned Income Tax Credit. It was endorsed by Bill Cohen (R-ME), Bennett Johnston (D-LA), and John Danforth (R-MO). Boren's proposal never passed committee. Clinton himself claimed he had an alternative tax proposal that favored taxes on energy. In 1995, Clinton expressed his belief that taxes had been raised too much (in 1997, Congress cut the capital gains tax from 28% to 20%).

Another proposal was offered in the House by John Kasich (R-OH). He sponsored an amendment that would have reduced the deficit by cutting $355 billion in spending with $129 billion of the cuts coming from entitlement programs (the actual bill cut entitlement spending by only $42 billion). The amendment would have eliminated any tax increases. The amendment failed by a 138–295 vote, with many Republicans voting against the amendment and only six Democrats voting in favor.

== Aftermath ==
Combined with a strong economy, the 1993 deficit reduction plan produced smaller budget deficits each year. In 1998, the federal government experienced the first budget surplus since 1969. Reflecting the perceived importance of the budget surplus, the New York Times described the end of budget deficits as "the fiscal equivalent of the fall of the Berlin Wall."

The White House's Office of Management and Budget (OMB) projected that the bill would reduce the federal budget deficit by $504.8 billion, of which $250.1 billion came from tax increases and $254.7 billion came from spending cuts. Meanwhile, the Congressional Budget Office's (CBO) analysis projected lower deficit reduction, at just $433 billion. Differences in the two estimates stem primarily from the OMB's inclusion of savings that were indirect estimates from the budget, such as a 5-year $107.7 billion freezing of discretionary appropriations, $59.6 billion from lower interest on the debt in the future from reduced debt issuances, and $16.4 billion from the Treasury refinancing the national debt at lower interest rates. The CBO estimate did not count or only gave partial credit for the debt refinancing plan, spending cuts that were already included in the previous 1990 budget act but were furthered by the 1993 act, and a plan to auction off parts of the radio frequency spectrum to commercial communications vendors.

The Omnibus Budget Reconciliation Act of 1993 became a leading target of Republican criticism of the Clinton administration. Republicans argued Clinton's tax hikes on high income earners violated earlier promises he had made to not raise taxes and reduce the deficit. The bill's delayed revenue stream meant that Clinton could not claim he had reduced the deficit by the 1994 midterms.
