= Title IV of the Patriot Act =

The USA PATRIOT Act was passed by the United States Congress in 2001 as a response to the September 11, 2001 attacks. It has ten titles, each containing numerous sections. Title IV: Protecting the Border aims to prevent terrorism in the USA through immigration regulations. The provisions of the title generally increase the difficulty of entering the country for those known to have, or suspected of having, terrorist intent.

Title IV amends large parts of the Immigration and Nationality Act, giving more law enforcement and investigative power to the United States Attorney General and to the Immigration and Naturalization Service. Criticisms of the title include its lack of mention of judicial review for groups designated as terrorist and its sections that mandate study of potential future legislative enhancements rather than enforcement action.

== Subtitle A--Protecting the Northern Border ==
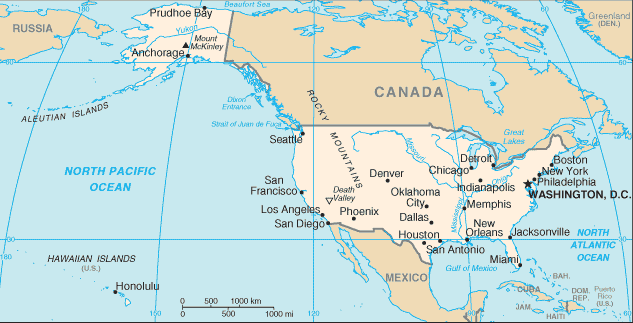
Canada lies to the north of the United States.

The Attorney General was authorized to waive any cap on the number of full-time employees (FTEs) assigned to the Immigration and Naturalization Service on the Northern border of the United States (the country to the north of the U.S. is Canada). Enough funds were also set aside to triple the maximum number of Border Patrol personnel, Customs Service personnel and INS inspectors along with an additional US$50,000,000 funding for the INS and the U.S. Customs Service to improve technology for monitoring the Northern Border and acquiring additional equipment at the Northern Border. The INS was also given the authority to authorise overtime payments of up to an extra US$30,000 a year to INS employees.

Access was given to the Department of State and the INS to certain identifying information in the criminal history records of visa applicants and applicants for admission to the United States. The information that may be exchanged include the criminal history record information contained in the National Crime Information Center's Interstate Identification Index (NCIC-III), Wanted Persons File and any other files maintained by the National Crime Information Center. Such information is provided as an extract from an automated visa lookout system or other appropriate database, and is provided free of charge. However, for the Department of State to obtain the full criminal record, it must first submit the applicant's fingerprints to the Criminal Justice Information Services Division of the FBI. The Department of State was required to form final regulations that govern the procedures for taking fingerprints and the conditions with which the department was allowed to use such information. The final regulations are specified in 22 CFR 40.5. Additionally, a technology standard to become the technology basis for a cross-agency, cross-platform electronic system was mandated to be developed by the National Institute of Standards and Technology (NIST) to be used to verify the identity of persons applying for a United States for the purposes of conducting background checks, confirming identity, and ensuring that a person has not received a visa under a different name. This report was released on November 13, 2002, however, according to NIST, this was later "determined that the fingerprint system used was not as accurate as current state-of-the-art fingerprint systems and is approximately equivalent to commercial fingerprint systems available in 1998" This report was later superseded by section 303(a) of the Enhanced Border Security and Visa Entry Reform Act of 2002.

== Subtitle B--Enhanced immigration provisions ==
=== Terrorism definitions ===
The Immigration and Nationality Act (INA) was retroactively amended to disallow aliens who are part representatives of a foreign organization or any group who endorses acts of terrorism the ability to enter the United States. This includes any alien who has used their prominence to persuade others to support terrorist activities. The child or spouse of such an alien is also inadmissible to the U.S. for a period of 5 years since the alien's last known terrorist action, though this does not apply in cases where the spouse or child was not aware such activities were being undertaken. An exception is also made in cases where a consulate official or the U.S. Attorney General is aware the alien has renounced their terrorist activities. Any alien who the Secretary of State, after consultation with the Attorney General, or the Attorney General, after consultation with the Secretary of State, determines has been associated with a terrorist organization and intends while in the United States to engage in activities that could endanger the welfare, safety, or security of the United States is also inadmissible.

Several definitions were defined or amended in the INA. The definition of "terrorist activity" was strengthened to include actions involving the use of any dangerous device (and not just explosives and firearms). To "engage in terrorist activity" is defined as committing, inciting to commit or planning and preparing to undertake an act of terrorism. Included in this definition is the gathering of intelligence information on potential terrorist targets, the solicitation of funds for a terrorist organization or the solicitation of others to undertake acts of terrorism. Those who provide knowing assistance to a person who is planning to perform such activities are defined as undertaking terrorist activities. Such assistance includes affording material support, including a safe house, transportation, communications, funds, transfer of funds or other material financial benefit, false documentation or identification, weapons (including chemical, biological, or radiological weapons), explosives, or training to perform the terrorist act.

The INA criteria for making a decision to designate an organization as a terrorist organization was amended to include the definition of a terrorist act as specified in section 140(d)(2) of the Foreign Relations Authorization Act, Fiscal Years 1988 and 1989. When an organization is to be designated a terrorist organization, seven days before making the designation under 8 U.S.C. § 1189 the Secretary of State must make a classified notification of this and the reasoning behind the decision in writing to the Speaker and Minority Leader of the House of Representatives, the President pro tempore of the U.S. Senate, the Majority and Minority Leaders of the United States Senate, and the members of the relevant committees of the House of Representatives and the Senate. The Secretary must also publish the designation in the Federal Register seven days after providing the notification. The Secretary of State can redesignate any such organization at the end of a two-year redesignation period for an additional two years if the situation that caused the original designation has not changed.

Though the amendment is retroactive, this does not mean that it can be applied to members who joined an organization, but since left, before it was designated to be a terrorist organization under 8 U.S.C. § 1189 by the Secretary of State.

=== Mandatory detention provisions ===
The Act added a new section (section 236A) to the INA, which requires the Attorney General, or his deputy, to take into custody any alien who is engaged in terrorism, or who is engaged in an activity that endangers U.S. national security, or who is inadmissible or deportable because it is certified they:

- are attempting to enter in order to undertake illegal espionage, are exporting goods, technology or sensitive information illegally or are attempting to control or overthrow the government; or
- have, or will have, engaged in terrorist activities.

The Attorney General or the Attorney General's deputy may maintain custody of the alien until they are removed from the U.S., unless it is no longer deemed they should be removed, in which case they are released. The alien can be detained for up to 90 days but can be held up to 6 months after it is deemed that they are a national security threat. However, removal proceedings or an arrest must be made no longer than 7 days after the alien's detention, otherwise the alien will be released.

The certification of the alien must be reviewed every 6 months by the Attorney General, who can then decide to revoke it — unless that is prohibited by law. Every 6 months the alien may apply, in writing, for the certification to be reconsidered.

Judicial review of any action or decision relating to this section, including judicial review of the merits of a certification, can be held under habeas corpus proceedings. Such proceedings can be initiated by an application filed with the United States Supreme Court, by any justice of the Supreme Court, by any circuit judge of the United States Court of Appeals for the District of Columbia Circuit, or by any district court otherwise having jurisdiction to entertain the application. The final order is subject to appeal to the United States Court of Appeals for the District of Columbia Circuit.

Provisions were also made for a report to be required of the U.S. Attorney General every six months which details:

- the number of aliens certified under the INA,
- the grounds for such certifications,
- the nationalities of the aliens who were certified,
- the length of the detention for each certified alien, and
- the number of aliens who were certified who were granted any form of relief from removal, removed or who were determined by the Attorney General to be no longer aliens who may be certified or who were released from detention.

=== Multilateral cooperation against terrorists ===
The issuance or refusal of visas or permits to enter the United States are confidential except when such records are needed by a court in the interest of justice. Section 413 amended this to allow the Secretary of State to provide to a foreign government information about aliens in the Department of State’s computerized visa lookout database and other relevant records so they can prevent, investigate, or punish acts that would constitute a crime in the United States.

=== Visa integrity and security ===
Under section 414, the sense of Congress was given that the U.S. Secretary of State should expedite the full implementation of the integrated entry and exit data system for airports, seaports, and land border ports of entry specified in the Illegal Immigration Reform and Immigrant Responsibility Act of 1996 (IIRIRA). The sense of Congress was also that the U.S. Attorney General should immediately start the Integrated Entry and Exit Data System Task Force specified in section 3 of the Immigration and Naturalization Service Data Management Improvement Act of 2000. The task force is made up of 16 representatives of a variety of governmental agencies (section 415 of the Patriot Act specifies that the Office of Homeland Security must be involved with the Entry-Exit Task Force) and evaluates how the Attorney General can efficiently and effectively carry out the implementation of the integrated entry and exit data system. It also takes into consideration how the U.S. can improve the flow of traffic at such points of entry by enhancing systems for data collection and data sharing, increasing cooperation between the public and private sectors, increasing cooperation among Federal agencies and among Federal and State agencies; and modifying information technology systems while taking into account the different data systems, infrastructure, and processing procedures of airports, seaports, and land border ports of entry. The section also ensured that there was enough money for the implementation of the integrated entry and exit data system.

The section specifies that the primary focus of development of the system was to be on the utilization of biometric technology and the development of tamper-resistant documents readable at ports of entry. The section also specified that the system was to be able to interface with law enforcement databases.

At the end of 12 months, the Office of Homeland Security was to present a report to Congress on the information that is needed from any U.S. agency to effectively screen visa applicants and applicants for admission to the U.S. to identify those affiliated with terrorist organizations or those that pose any threat to the safety or security of the U.S..

=== Foreign student monitoring program ===
Section 416 of the Patriot Act requires the U.S. Attorney General to implement and expand the foreign student monitoring program that was established under section 641(a) of the IIRIRA and record the date and port of entry of each foreign student. It also expanded the program to include other approved educational institutions. This includes air flight schools, language training schools or vocational schools that are approved by the Attorney General, in consultation with the Secretary of Education and the Secretary of State. The section appropriated US$36,800,000 for the Department of Justice to implement section 641(a) of the IIRIRA.

=== Machine readable passports ===
The INA authorizes the U.S. Attorney General and Secretary of State to waive the visa requirement for aliens under certain circumstances Section 417 of the Patriot Act makes it a requirement of the Secretary of State to audit, and report to Congress on the results of the audit, the visa waiver program for each fiscal year until September 30, 2007, and also to check for the implementation of precautionary measures to prevent the counterfeiting and theft of passports as well as ascertain that countries designated under the visa waiver program have established a program to develop tamper-resistant passports. To qualify for the waiver, the INA specifies that the alien must have provided a valid machine-readable passport. However, from October 1, 2003 till September 30, 2007 this requirement is waived if the Secretary of State finds that the alien's home country is making progress toward ensuring that machine readable passports are generally available to its nationals, or is taking reasonable steps to protect against the misuse of non-machine readable passports.

=== Prevention of consulate shopping ===
The U.S. Secretary of State was required to determine whether consulate shopping was a problem, which is the practice of applying for visas at different consulate posts in the hope of finding one that will be more sympathetic to the applicant and thus approve the visa. Section 418 of the Patriot Act required the Secretary to report back to Congress if it was. No report was ever filed.

== Subtitle C--Preservation of immigration benefits for victims of terrorism ==
Subtitle C was introduced by Senators John Conyers and Patrick Leahy as they recognised that some families, through no fault of their own, would either be ineligible for permanent residence in the United States due to being unable to make important deadlines because of the September 11 terrorist attacks, or had become ineligible to apply for special immigration status because their loved one died in the attacks.

The legislation defines an "age-out" protection for children who are part of a petition for citizenship in that it allows those whose 21st birthday occurs in September 2001 and whose parents had applied for citizenship before September 11, 2001 to be defined as a child for 90 days after their 21st birthday. Those whose 21st birthday occurs after September 2001 are considered to be a child for 45 days after their 21st birthday. Provisions were also made to allow the U.S. Attorney General to provide temporary administrative relief for humanitarian purposes or to ensure family unity to those who were residing in the U.S. before September 11, 2001 and who were the spouse, parent, or child of the individual who died as a result of the terrorist attacks.

In order to carry out the Act, the U.S. Attorney General was given authority to establish appropriate standards for evidence demonstrating that death, disability or loss of employment due to physical damage or destruction of a business occurred because of the terrorist attacks. The Attorney General was not required to promulgate regulations prior to implementing the subtitle. No benefits applied to those deemed to be terrorists or family members of terrorists.

=== Special immigrant and non immigrant status ===
Section 421 allowed special immigrant status to be given to the spouses and children, or grandparents and children, of a petitioner for such status if they had been killed or maimed severely as a direct result of the attacks, and thus had their petition nullified. In order to gain the status, an immigrant must follow the procedure as outlined in section 204 of the INA.

Under section 422, those who had entered the U.S. as a spouse or child of a principal nonimmigrant who was killed or disabled as a direct result of the terrorist attacks were given an extension of their nonimmigrant status for one year after the attacks took place. There were also given the right to be provided with an "employment authorization" endorsement no later than 30 days after they made the application for it. If the nonimmigrant was prevented from filing a timely application for a change or extension of non-immigrant status due to the terrorist attacks, they were given a 60-day extension. Alternatively, if the non-immigrant was lawfully present in the U.S. on September 10, 2001 and was unable to depart because of the attacks, they were not counted as being unlawfully present in the U.S for the period of September 11 to November 11, 2001. Conversely, if the non-immigrant was abroad and was unable to return to the U.S. in order to file an application for extension of their nonimmigrant status then they were given an extra 60 days to file for their extension, and their status continued to the date the status would ordinarily terminated, or 60 days after this date, whichever came later.

The circumstances under which delays in filing were to be considered were:

- office closures;
- mail or courier service cessations or delays; and
- other closures, cessations, or delays affecting case processing or travel necessary to satisfy legal requirements

The circumstances under which departure and return delays were to be considered were:

- office closures;
- airline flight cessations or delays; and
- other closures, cessations, or delays affecting case processing or travel necessary to satisfy legal requirements.

=== Diversity Immigrant Visa ===
If an immigrant was given a Diversity Immigrant Visa (better known as the Green Card Lottery), but was unable to use it due to the September 11, 2001 terrorist attacks, then they were able to use it in the period beginning on October 1, 2001, and ending on April 1, 2002. The circumstances under which an alien might claim they were prevented from using the visa were:

- office closures;
- mail or courier service cessations or delays;
- airline flight cessations or delays; and
- other closures, cessations, or delays affecting case processing or travel necessary to satisfy legal requirements.

If the principal alien who received a Diversity Immigrant Visa died as a result of the attacks, then his or her spouse and children were entitled to the same status until June 30, 2002.

=== Other visas and paroles ===
If an alien was not able to enter the U.S. due to the attacks and their visa was due to expire before December 31, 2001, then the visa was extended to December 31, 2001. Similarly, any alien who was given parole by the U.S. Attorney General but was unable to enter into the U.S. due to the attacks had their parole extended by 60 days. In both cases, the circumstances that were to be considered were:

- office closures;
- airline flight cessations or delays; and
- other closures, cessations, or delays affecting case processing or travel necessary to satisfy legal requirements.

=== Immediate relatives ===
The INA normally requires a U.S. citizen to have been married to a non-U.S. person for two years before they can be granted U.S. citizenship. However, section 423 of the Patriot Act waived the two year criteria for those who were spouses or children of a citizen who was killed in the 9/11 terrorist attacks. The spouse or children must have made a petition to the U.S. Attorney General within 2 years of the attacks — therefore this provision has well and truly passed.

== References & notes ==
Notes
