= Enhanced Primary Care Case Management Program =

Government healthcare program in the USA

Primary Care Case Management (PCCM), is a program of the United States government healthcare service Medicaid. It oversees the United States system of managed care used by state Medicaid agencies in which a primary care provider is responsible for approving and monitoring the care of enrolled Medicaid beneficiaries, typically for a small monthly case management fee in addition to fee-for-service reimbursement for treatment. In the mid-1980s, states began enrolling beneficiaries in their PCCM programs in an attempt to increase access and reduce inappropriate emergency department and other high cost care. Use increased steadily through the 1990s.

== History ==
In 1981, the 97th session of Congress enacted the Omnibus Budget Reconciliation Act (OBRA) which allowed state Medicaid programs to implement risk-based managed care programs as well as PCCM, pending HCFA (now known as CMS) waiver approval. The state had to meet two requirements in order to be granted HCFA approval.

- The case management restrictions must not "substantially impair access" to primary care services of "adequate quality where medically necessary;" and
- The case management restrictions must be "cost effective."

In their earliest forms, PCCM programs closely resembled traditional fee-for-service Medicaid than managed care. Some states developed PCCM as a first step towards risk-based managed care and considered their MCO contracts as the main managed care system. As PCCM programs matured, state goals have expanded to improving quality of care provided. States have used strategies similar to network management principles used by MCOs. PCCM programs have evolved over the past two decades through the addition of a variety of care management and care coordination features. These include payment innovations; increased care management resources; improved performance monitoring and reporting; increased resources for management of serious and complex medical conditions; and a variety of “medical home” innovations, including performance-based reimbursement, better use of information technology, increased contact with patients, and efforts to provide additional resources for physician offices.

== Intent ==
By 1986, seven states had implemented PCCM programs. By 1990, that number had grown to 19. States were motivated to implement PCCM programs for several reasons:

- States wanted to increase access to health care. State officials tried giving participating physicians a small payment to encourage physicians to accept more Medicaid beneficiaries. Each beneficiary would choose or be assigned a participating physician who would serve as his/her medical home.
- States felt physicians would like PCCM more that risk-based managed care.
- States hoped to save money by eliminating unnecessary or inappropriate emergency department (ED) and specialist visits, lab tests, and other high-cost care.
- States thought PCCM would be well-suited for rural areas where MCOs have difficulty maintaining an adequate population base for financial viability.

== Prevalence of PCCM ==
As of July 1, 2010, approximately 21% of the almost 39 million Medicaid enrollees who were enrolled in a comprehensive managed care plan were enrolled in a PCCM program.

- These 8 million consumers participate in PCCM programs in 31 states.
- There are 11 states which offer PCCM as the only managed care option.
- Illinois, North Carolina, Texas and Louisiana have the largest PCCM programs, each with over 700,000 enrollees.
- Approximately 30 percent of SCHIP enrollees are served by PCCM systems.

== Organization of PCCM programs ==
In most PCCM programs, PCPs are paid a per member per month fee for each Medicaid beneficiary or an increase in preventive service fees to pay for case management services. In addition, PCPs are paid on a fee-for-service reimbursement for all primary care services that he/she provides. HMOs are not involved. In return, the PCP is responsible for providing primary care and for prior authorizations to hospitals and specialty care providers. Physicians bear no financial risk for the services they provide or approve. State Medicaid agencies may include additional activities, such as medical management, network management or performance incentives, to improve outcomes and generate cost savings. States vary in how they manage provider networks, provider recruitment, data collection and analysis, monitoring, quality improvement, patient education, disease management programs and enrollment. Some states perform all these programs in-house using state employees; other states contract out all or some of these functions.

== Scientific evidence ==
States that have tried implementing PCCM programs have encountered mostly positive results:

- PCCM has been shown to improve patient outcomes. A study of Medicaid-enrolled children in Virginia found that immunization rates were higher among PCCM enrollees than among enrollees in either mandatory or voluntary HMO programs.
- Disease management programs, a prominent part of many PCCM programs, have shown to improve health outcomes by increasing communication between the patient and his/her PCP.
- The cost effectiveness of PCCM is thought to derive from increased preventive services and less use of costly services such as emergency department visits. A recent cost analysis of the Iowa PCCM program found that PCCM was associated with substantial aggregate cost savings over an 8-year period, and that this effect becomes stronger over time.
