= Medicaid =

United States social health care program

Agency overview
- Formed: July 30, 1965; 61 years ago
- Agency executive: Mehmet Oz, Administrator
- Parent department: Centers for Medicare and Medicaid Services
- Key document: Social Security Amendments of 1965
- Website: www.medicaid.gov

Medicaid is a government program in the United States that provides health insurance for adults and children with limited income and resources. The program is partially funded and primarily managed by state governments, which also have wide latitude in determining eligibility and benefits, but the federal government sets baseline standards for state Medicaid programs and provides a significant portion of their funding. States are not required to participate in the program, although all have since 1982.

Medicaid was established by the Social Security Amendments of 1965 as part of the Great Society set of programs that formed the policy agenda of President Lyndon B. Johnson, and was significantly expanded by the Affordable Care Act (ACA), which was passed in 2010. In most states, any member of a household with income up to 138% of the federal poverty line qualifies for Medicaid coverage under the provisions of the ACA. A 2012 Supreme Court decision established that states may continue to use pre-ACA Medicaid eligibility standards and receive previously established levels of federal Medicaid funding, which led some Republican-controlled states to not expand Medicaid coverage. The 2025 One Big Beautiful Bill Act established requirements for most able-bodied adult Medicaid enrollees to work or volunteer for 80 hours per month in order to maintain coverage; these provisions will become effective in 2027.

Medicaid is the largest source of funding for medical and health-related services for people with low income in the United States, providing taxpayer-funded health insurance to 85 million low-income and disabled people as of 2022; in 2019, the program paid for half of all U.S. births. In 2023, the total (federal and state) annual cost of Medicaid was $870 billion, with an average cost per enrollee of $7,600 for 2021. 37% of enrollees were children, but they only accounted for 15% of the spending, ($3,000 per person) while seniors and disabled persons accounted for 21% of enrollees and 52% of spending (more than $18,000 per person). In general, Medicaid recipients must be U.S. citizens or qualified non-citizens, and may include low-income adults, their children, and people with certain disabilities. Medicaid also covers long-term services and supports, including both nursing home care and home- and community-based services, for those with low incomes and minimal assets. Of the 7.7 million Americans who used long-term services and supports in 2020, about 5.6 million were covered by Medicaid.

Along with Medicare, Tricare, ChampVA, and CHIP, Medicaid is one of the several Federal Government-sponsored medical insurance programs in the United States. Medicaid covers healthcare costs for people with low incomes; Medicare is a universal program providing health coverage for the elderly; and the CHIP program covers uninsured children in families with incomes that are too high to be covered by Medicaid. Medicaid offers elder care benefits not normally covered by Medicare, including nursing home care and personal care services. There are also dual health plans for people who have both Medicaid and Medicare.

Research shows that existence of the Medicaid program improves health outcomes, health insurance coverage, access to health care, and recipients' financial security and provides economic benefits to states and health providers. In American politics, the Democratic Party tends to support Medicaid while the Republican Party is divided on reductions in Medicaid spending.

== Features ==
Beginning in the 1980s, many states received waivers from the federal government to create Medicaid managed care programs. Under managed care, Medicaid recipients are enrolled in a private health plan, which receives a fixed monthly premium from the state. The health plan is then responsible for providing for all or most of the recipient's healthcare needs. Today, all but a few states use managed care to provide coverage to a significant proportion of Medicaid enrollees. As of 2014, 26 states have contracts with managed care organizations (MCOs) to deliver long-term care for the elderly and individuals with disabilities. The states pay a monthly capitated rate per member to the MCOs, which in turn provide comprehensive care and accept the risk of managing total costs. Nationwide, roughly 80% of Medicaid enrollees are enrolled in managed care plans. Core eligibility groups of low-income families are most likely to be enrolled in managed care, while the "aged" and "disabled" eligibility groups more often remain in traditional "fee for service" Medicaid.

Because service level costs vary depending on the care and needs of the enrolled, a cost per person average is only a rough measure of actual cost of care. The annual cost of care will vary state to state depending on state approved Medicaid benefits, as well as the state specific care costs. A 2014 Kaiser Family Foundation report estimates the national average per capita annual cost of Medicaid services for children to be $2,577, adults to be $3,278, persons with disabilities to be $16,859, aged persons (65+) to be $13,063, and all Medicaid enrollees to be $5,736.

== History ==
The Social Security Amendments of 1965 created Medicaid by adding Title XIX to the Social Security Act. Under the program, the federal government provided matching funds to states to enable them to provide Medical Assistance to residents who met certain eligibility requirements. The objective was to help states assist residents whose income and resources were insufficient to pay the costs of traditional commercial health insurance plans.

By 1982, all states were participating. The last state to do so was Arizona.

The Medicaid Drug Rebate Program and the Health Insurance Premium Payment Program (HIPP) were created by the Omnibus Budget Reconciliation Act of 1990 (OBRA-90). This act helped to add Section 1927 to the Social Security Act of 1935 and became effective on January 1, 1991. This program was formed due to the costs that Medicaid programs were paying for discount price outpatient drugs.

The Omnibus Budget Reconciliation Act of 1993 (OBRA-93) amended Section 1927 of the Act, bringing changes to the Medicaid Drug Rebate Program. It requires states to implement a Medicaid estate recovery program to recover from the estate of deceased beneficiaries the long-term-care-related costs paid by Medicaid, and gives states the option of recovering all non-long-term-care costs, including full medical costs.

Medicaid also offers a Fee for Service (Direct Service) Program to schools throughout the United States for the reimbursement of costs associated with the services delivered to students with special education needs. Federal law mandates that children with disabilities receive a "free appropriate public education" under Section 504 of The Rehabilitation Act of 1973. Decisions by the United States Supreme Court and subsequent changes in federal law require states to reimburse part or all of the cost of some services provided by schools for Medicaid-eligible disabled children.

=== Expansion under the Affordable Care Act ===
ACA Medicaid expansion by state: Not adopted Implemented

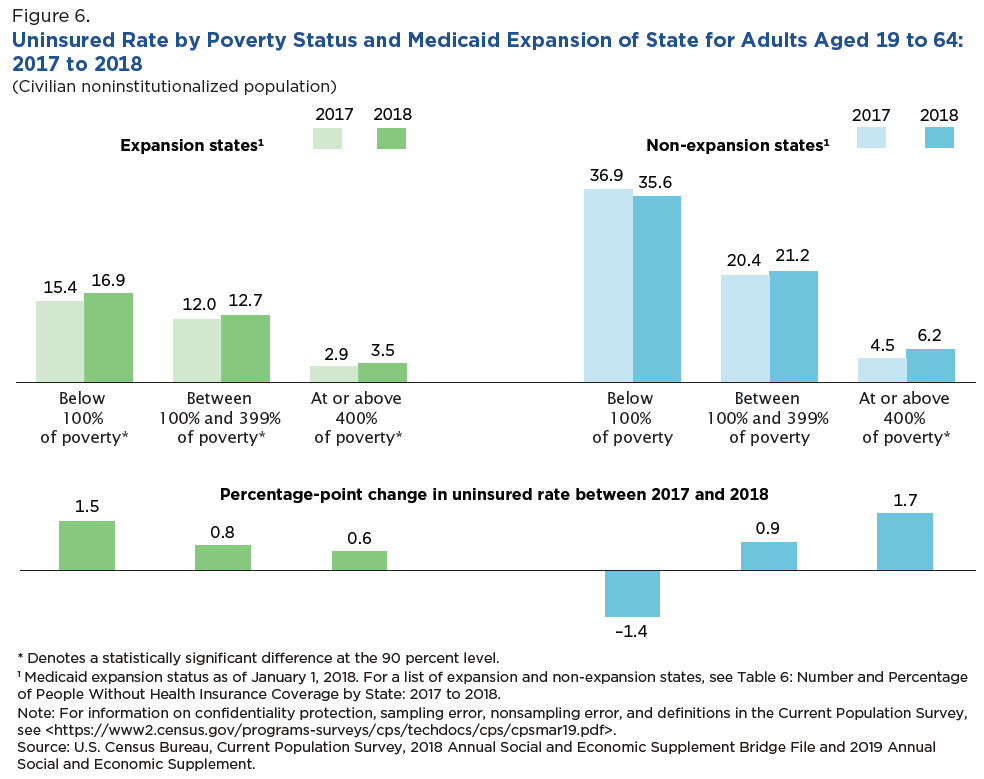
States that expanded Medicaid under ACA had a lower uninsured rate in 2018 at various income levels.

The Affordable Care Act (ACA), passed in 2010, substantially expanded the Medicaid program. Before the law was passed, some states did not allow able-bodied adults to participate in Medicaid, and many set income eligibility far below the Federal poverty level. Under the provisions of the law, any state that participated in Medicaid would need to expand coverage to include anyone earning up to 138% of the Federal poverty level beginning in 2014. The costs of the newly covered population would initially be covered in full by the Federal government, although states would need to pay for 10% of those costs by 2020.

However, in 2012, the Supreme Court held in National Federation of Independent Business v. Sebelius that withdrawing all Medicaid funding from states that refused to expand eligibility was unconstitutionally coercive. States could choose to maintain pre-existing levels of Medicaid funding and eligibility, and some did; over half the national uninsured population lives in those states. As of March 2023, 40 states have accepted the Affordable Care Act Medicaid extension, as has the District of Columbia, which has its own Medicaid program; 10 states have not. Among adults aged 18 to 64, states that expanded Medicaid had an uninsured rate of 7.3% in the first quarter of 2016, while non-expansion states had a 14.1% uninsured rate.

The Centers for Medicare and Medicaid Services (CMS) estimated that the cost of expansion was $6,366 per person for 2015, about 49 percent above previous estimates. An estimated 9 to 10 million people had gained Medicaid coverage, mostly low-income adults. The Kaiser Family Foundation estimated in October 2015 that 3.1 million additional people were not covered in states that rejected the Medicaid expansion.

In some states that chose not to expand Medicaid, income eligibility thresholds are significantly below 133% of the poverty line. Some of these states do not make Medicaid available to non-pregnant adults without disabilities or dependent children, no matter their income. Because subsidies on commercial insurance plans are not available to such individuals, most have few options for obtaining any medical insurance. For example, in Kansas, where only non-disabled adults with children and with an income below 32% of the poverty line were eligible for Medicaid, those with incomes from 32% to 100% of the poverty level ($6,250 to $19,530 for a family of three) were ineligible for both Medicaid and federal subsidies to buy insurance.

Studies of the impact of Medicaid expansion rejections calculated that up to 6.4 million people would have too much income for Medicaid but not qualify for exchange subsidies. Several states argued that they could not afford the 10% contribution in 2020. Some studies suggested that rejecting the expansion would cost more due to increased spending on uncompensated emergency care that otherwise would have been partially paid for by Medicaid coverage.

A 2016 study found that residents of Kentucky and Arkansas, which both expanded Medicaid, were more likely to receive health care services and less likely to incur emergency room costs or have trouble paying their medical bills. Residents of Texas, which did not accept the Medicaid expansion, did not see a similar improvement during the same period. Kentucky opted for increased managed care, while Arkansas subsidized private insurance. Later, Arkansas and Kentucky governors proposed reducing or modifying their programs. From 2013 to 2015, the uninsured rate dropped from 42% to 14% in Arkansas and from 40% to 9% in Kentucky, compared with 39% to 32% in Texas.

A 2016 DHHS study found that states that expanded Medicaid had lower premiums on exchange policies because they had fewer low-income enrollees, whose health, on average, is worse than that of people with higher income.

The Census Bureau reported in September 2019 that states that expanded Medicaid under ACA had considerably lower uninsured rates than states that did not. For example, for adults between 100% and 399% of poverty level, the uninsured rate in 2018 was 12.7% in expansion states and 21.2% in non-expansion states. Of the 14 states with uninsured rates of 10% or greater, 11 had not expanded Medicaid. A July 2019 study by the National Bureau of Economic Research (NBER) indicated that states enacting Medicaid expansion exhibited statistically significant reductions in mortality rates.

The ACA was structured with the assumption that Medicaid would cover anyone making less than 133% of the Federal poverty level throughout the United States; as a result, premium tax credits are only available to individuals buying private health insurance through exchanges if they make more than that amount. This has given rise to the so-called Medicaid coverage gap in states that have not expanded Medicaid: there are people whose income is too high to qualify for Medicaid in those states, but too low to receive assistance in paying for private health insurance, which is therefore unaffordable to them.

=== Medicaid work requirements ===
A federal judge blocked Medicaid work requirements in Arkansas and Kentucky on March 27, 2019, ruling that the mandates undermined Medicaid's core purpose of providing health care to the needy. U.S. District Judge James Boasberg found that the requirements created obstacles to coverage and had been improperly approved by federal officials.

=== 2025 Medicaid cuts in the second Trump administration ===
In 2025, Republican Congressional leaders John Thune and Mike Johnson announced goals of cutting 1.5 to 2 trillion dollars of the U.S. federal budget, with President Donald Trump stating that cuts to Medicaid would only include "abuse or waste". The 2025 budget resolution, which was passed by the House of Representatives with only Republicans votes, proposed cutting $880 billion from the Standing Committee for Energy and Commerce, which includes many areas, such as Medicaid and Medicare.

On July 4, 2025, President Donald Trump signed the One Big Beautiful Bill Act, intended in part to implement this resolution. The act cut Medicaid in a number of ways: while it did not repeal the ACA's Medicaid expansion, it mandated work requirements for able-bodied Medicaid recipients. It also requires Medicaid recipients above the federal poverty line to pay more fees for coverage; adds new verification requirements; increases the number of times states need to check the eligibility of their Medicaid expansion recipients; prohibits Medicaid from funding nonprofits that provide abortion care; makes it harder for illegal immigrants to use Medicaid; bans pharmacy benefit managers from using spread pricing; and puts limits on so-called "provider taxes" that states impose on healthcare providers to fund their portion of Medicaid spending. The non-partisan Congressional Budget Office (CBO) estimated that it will reduce the number of people on Medicaid by several million.; the CBO estimates that the work requirements in particular will lead 11 million to lose their Medicaid coverage, many of whom already work or qualify for exemptions but will not be able to get through the red tape.

The bill prompted claims that undocumented immigrants are on Medicaid. Undocumented immigrants are already ineligible for full Medicaid benefits, and many undocumented immigrants access state-funded health programs rather than federal Medicaid. According to a CBO analysis, the bill's provisions could lead some states to cut back those state-funded health programs, potentially causing an estimated 1.4 million people to lose state-level health coverage, including undocumented immigrants. When commenting on the Trump administration's One Big Beautiful Bill Act and the impact of the Medicaid provisions on the economy, USDA Secretary Brooke Rollins stated that 34 million able-bodied adults on Medicaid should be working. According to the Government Accountability Office, roughly 70% of Medicaid recipients already work at least 35 hours per week but still qualify due to low wage.

== State implementations ==
States may bundle together the administration of Medicaid with other programs such as the Children's Health Insurance Program (CHIP), so the same organization that handles Medicaid in a state may also manage the additional programs. Separate programs may also exist in some localities that are funded by the states or their political subdivisions to provide health coverage for indigents and minors.

State participation in Medicaid is voluntary; however, all states have participated since 1982. In some states Medicaid is subcontracted to private health insurance companies, while other states pay providers (i.e., doctors, clinics and hospitals) directly. There are many services that can fall under Medicaid and some states support more services than other states. The most provided services are intermediate care for mentally disabled, prescription drugs and nursing facility care for under 21-year-olds. The least provided services include institutional religious (non-medical) health care, respiratory care for ventilator dependent and PACE (inclusive elderly care).

Most states administer Medicaid through their own programs. A few of those programs include:

- Arizona: AHCCCS
- California: Medi-Cal
- Connecticut: HUSKY D
- Illinois: HealthChoice Illinois
- Iowa: Hawk-i Healthy and Well-Kids in Iowa
- Maine: MaineCare
- Massachusetts: MassHealth
- New Jersey: NJ FamilyCare
- Oregon: Oregon Health Plan
- Oklahoma: Soonercare
- Tennessee: TennCare
- Washington: Washington Apple Health
- Wisconsin: BadgerCare

As of January 2012, Medicaid and/or CHIP funds could be obtained to help pay employer health care premiums in Alabama, Alaska, Arizona, Colorado, Florida, and Georgia.

=== Differences by state ===
While states have significant autonomy in implementing the Medicaid program, their flexibility is bounded by federal requirements designed to ensure a baseline of coverage and access. For example, federal law mandates that certain services, such as inpatient and outpatient hospital services, laboratory and X-ray services, and physician services, must be covered by all state Medicaid programs. Additionally, states must adhere to federal guidelines regarding beneficiary protections and quality standards. Any state-initiated changes that seek to modify these fundamental aspects typically require approval through federal waivers, ensuring that state innovations align with national objectives and statutory requirements.

==== Eligibility and coverage ====
Broadly, the program provides health benefits to low-income individuals, including children, pregnant women, parents, seniors, and people with disabilities. The ACA expanded Medicaid eligibility to adults with incomes at or below 133% of the federal poverty level, though states have the option to implement this expansion.

Eligibility is primarily determined using the modified adjusted gross income system, which standardizes income calculations across Medicaid, CHIP, and health insurance marketplace subsidies. However, certain groups, such as seniors and individuals with disabilities, have their eligibility determined using Supplemental Security Income (SSI) rules, which may include asset tests. Medicaid also includes provisions for individuals with significant medical expenses who do not otherwise qualify financially, allowing them to "spend down" their income on medical costs to become eligible.

In addition to financial criteria, Medicaid applicants must meet non-financial requirements, including residency in the state where they apply and U.S. citizenship or qualifying non-citizen status. Some eligibility groups, such as children in foster care under Title IV-E and certain former foster youth, automatically qualify regardless of income. Coverage begins either on the date of application or the first day of the application month, with potential retroactive coverage for up to three months.

States also have the option to offer "medically needy" programs for individuals whose incomes exceed standard Medicaid limits but who have substantial medical expenses. Additional Medicaid policies address estate recovery, third-party liability, and spousal impoverishment protections for long-term care applicants. If an individual is denied Medicaid, they have the right to appeal the decision through state-administered processes.

==== Reimbursement for care providers ====
Beyond the variance in eligibility and coverage between states, there is a large variance in the reimbursements Medicaid offers to care providers; the clearest examples of this are common orthopedic procedures. For instance, in 2013, the average difference in reimbursement for 10 common orthopedic procedures in the states of New Jersey and Delaware was $3,047. The discrepancy in the reimbursements Medicaid offers may affect the type of care provided to patients.

In general, Medicaid plans pay providers significantly less than commercial insurers or Medicare would pay for the same care, paying around 67% as much as Medicare would for primary care and 78% as much for other services. This disparity has been linked to lower provider rates of participation in Medicaid programs vs Medicare or commercial insurance, and thus decreased access to care for Medicaid patients. One component of the Affordable Care Act was a federally-funded increase in 2013 and 2014 in Medicaid payments to bring them up to 100% of equivalent Medicare payments, in an effort to increase provider participation. Most states did not subsequently continue this provision.

== Enrollment ==
In 2002, Medicaid enrollees numbered 39.9 million Americans, with the largest group being children (18.4 million or 46%). From 2000 to 2012, the proportion of hospital stays for children paid by Medicaid increased by 33% and the proportion paid by private insurance decreased by 21%. Some 43 million Americans were enrolled in 2004 (19.7 million of them children) at a total cost of $295 billion. In 2008, Medicaid provided health coverage and services to approximately 49 million low-income children, pregnant women, elderly people, and disabled people. In 2009, 62.9 million Americans were enrolled in Medicaid for at least one month, with an average enrollment of 50.1 million. In California, about 23% of the population was enrolled in Medi-Cal for at least 1 month in 2009–10. As of 2017, the total annual cost of Medicaid was just over $600 billion, of which the federal government contributed $375 billion and states an additional $230 billion. According to CMS, the Medicaid program provided health care services to more than 92 million people in 2022.

Loss of income and medical insurance coverage during the Great Recession resulted in a substantial increase in Medicaid enrollment in 2009. Nine U.S. states showed an increase in enrollment of 15% or more, putting a heavy strain on state budgets.

The Kaiser Family Foundation reported that for 2013, Medicaid recipients were 40% white, 21% black, 25% Hispanic, and 14% other races.

== Comparisons with Medicare ==
Unlike Medicaid, Medicare is a social insurance program funded at the federal level and focuses primarily on the older population. Medicare is a health insurance program for people age 65 or older, people under age 65 with certain disabilities, and (through the End Stage Renal Disease Program) people of all ages with end-stage renal disease. The Medicare Program provides a Medicare part A covering hospital bills, Medicare Part B covering medical insurance coverage, and Medicare Part D covering purchase of prescription drugs.

Medicaid is a program that is not solely funded at the federal level. States provide up to half of the funding for Medicaid. In some states, counties also contribute funds. Unlike Medicare, Medicaid is a means-tested, needs-based social welfare or social protection program rather than a social insurance program. Eligibility is determined largely by income. The main criterion for Medicaid eligibility is limited income and financial resources, a criterion which plays no role in determining Medicare coverage. Medicaid covers a wider range of health care services than Medicare.

Some people are eligible for both Medicaid and Medicare and are known as Medicare dual eligible or medi-medis. In 2001, about 6.5 million people were enrolled in both Medicare and Medicaid. In 2013, approximately 9 million people qualified for Medicare and Medicaid.

== Benefits ==
There are two general types of Medicaid coverage. "Community Medicaid" helps people who have little or no medical insurance. Medicaid nursing home coverage helps pay for the cost of living in a nursing home for those who are eligible; the recipient also pays most of his/her income toward the nursing home costs, usually keeping only $66.00 a month for expenses other than the nursing home.

Some states operate a program known as the Health Insurance Premium Payment Program (HIPP). This program allows a Medicaid recipient to have private health insurance paid for by Medicaid. As of 2008 relatively few states had premium assistance programs and enrollment was relatively low. Interest in this approach remained high, however.

Included in the Social Security program under Medicaid are dental services. Registration for dental services is optional for people older than 21 years but required for people eligible for Medicaid and younger than 21. Minimum services include pain relief, restoration of teeth and maintenance for dental health. Early and Periodic Screening, Diagnostic and Treatment (EPSDT) is a mandatory Medicaid program for children that focuses on prevention, early diagnosis and treatment of medical conditions. Oral screenings are not required for EPSDT recipients, and they do not suffice as a direct dental referral. If a condition requiring treatment is discovered during an oral screening, the state is responsible for paying for this service, regardless of whether or not it is covered on that particular Medicaid plan.

=== Dental ===
Children enrolled in Medicaid are individually entitled under the law to comprehensive preventive and restorative dental services, but dental care utilization for this population is low. The reasons for low use are many, but a lack of dental providers who participate in Medicaid is a key factor. Few dentists participate in Medicaid – less than half of all active private dentists in some areas. Cited reasons for not participating are low reimbursement rates, complex forms and burdensome administrative requirements. In Washington state, a program called Access to Baby and Child Dentistry (ABCD) has helped increase access to dental services by providing dentists higher reimbursements for oral health education and preventive and restorative services for children. After the passing of the Affordable Care Act, many dental practices began using dental service organizations to provide business management and support, allowing practices to minimize costs and pass the saving on to patients currently without adequate dental care.

=== Mental Health Coverage ===
Medicaid is the largest source of funding for mental health services in the United States. The Mental Health Parity and Addiction Equity Act requires Medicaid managed care plans to provide mental health benefits equal to physical health benefits. Medicaid covers about 15 million adults with mental illness. Medicaid covers a broad range of mental health services, including inpatient hospitalization, outpatient counseling/therapy, prescription medications, mobile crisis services, and peer support programs. States that expanded Medicaid under the ACA saw improvements in access to mental health care and treatment continuity. In 2024, Medicaid covered about 41% of psychiatric inpatients at a sample of 680 hospitals, based on data analyzed for KFF Health News, demonstrating its role in financing mental health care.

== Eligibility ==
While Congress and the Centers for Medicare and Medicaid Services (CMS) set out the general rules under which Medicaid operates, each state runs its own program. Under certain circumstances, an applicant may be denied coverage. As a result, the eligibility rules differ significantly from state to state, although all states must follow the same basic framework.

As of 2013, Medicaid is a program intended for those with low income, but a low income is not the only requirement to enroll in the program. Eligibility is categorical—that is, to enroll one must be a member of a category defined by statute; some of these categories are: low-income children below a certain wage, pregnant women, parents of Medicaid-eligible children who meet certain income requirements, low-income disabled people who receive Supplemental Security Income and/or Social Security Disability (SSD), and low-income seniors 65 and older. The details of how each category is defined vary from state to state.

=== PPACA income test standardization ===
As of 2019, when Medicaid has been expanded under the PPACA, eligibility is determined by an income test using Modified Adjusted Gross Income, with no state-specific variations and a prohibition on asset or resource tests.

=== Non-PPACA eligibility ===
While Medicaid expansion available to adults under the PPACA mandates a standard income-based test without asset or resource tests, other eligibility criteria such as assets may apply when eligible outside of the PPACA expansion, including coverage for eligible seniors or disabled. These other requirements include, but are not limited to, assets, age, pregnancy, disability, blindness, income, and resources, and one's status as a U.S. citizen or a lawfully admitted immigrant.

As of 2015, asset tests varied; for example, eight states did not have an asset test for a buy-in available to working people with disabilities, and one state had no asset test for the aged/blind/disabled pathway up to 100% of the Federal Poverty Level.

More recently, many states have authorized financial requirements that will make it more difficult for working-poor adults to access coverage. In Wisconsin, nearly a quarter of Medicaid patients were dropped after the state government imposed premiums of 3% of household income. A survey in Minnesota found that more than half of those covered by Medicaid were unable to obtain prescription medications because of co-payments.

The Deficit Reduction Act of 2005 (DRA) requires anyone seeking Medicaid to produce documents to prove that he is a United States citizen or resident alien. An exception is made for Emergency Medicaid where payments are allowed for the pregnant and disabled regardless of immigration status. Special rules exist for those living in a nursing home and disabled children living at home.

==== Supplemental Security Income beneficiaries ====
Once someone is approved as a beneficiary in the Supplemental Security Income program, they may automatically be eligible for Medicaid coverage (depending on the laws of the state they reside in).

==== Five year "look-back" ====
The DRA has created a five-year "look-back period". This means that any transfers without fair market value (gifts of any kind) made by the Medicaid applicant during the preceding five years are penalizable.

The penalty is determined by dividing the average monthly cost of nursing home care in the area or State into the amount of assets gifted. Therefore, if a person gifted $60,000 and the average monthly cost of a nursing home was $6,000, one would divide $6000 into $60,000 and come up with 10. 10 represents the number of months the applicant would not be eligible for Medicaid.

All transfers made during the five-year look-back period are totaled, and the applicant is penalized based on that amount after having already dropped below the Medicaid asset limit. This means that after dropping below the asset level ($2,000 limit in most states), the Medicaid applicant will be ineligible for a period of time. The penalty period does not begin until the person is eligible for Medicaid.

Elders who gift or transfer assets can be caught in the situation of having no money but still not being eligible for Medicaid.

==== Immigration status ====
Legal permanent residents (LPRs) with a substantial work history (defined as 40 quarters of Social Security covered earnings) or military connection are eligible for the full range of major federal means-tested benefit programs, including Medicaid (Medi-Cal). LPRs entering after August 22, 1996, are barred from Medicaid for five years, after which their coverage becomes a state option, and states have the option to cover LPRs who are children or who are pregnant during the first five years. Noncitizen SSI recipients are eligible for (and required to be covered under) Medicaid. Refugees and asylees are eligible for Medicaid for seven years after arrival; after this term, they may be eligible at state option.

Nonimmigrants and unauthorized aliens are not eligible for most federal benefits, regardless of whether they are means tested, with notable exceptions for emergency services (e.g., Medicaid for emergency medical care), but states have the option to cover nonimmigrant and unauthorized aliens who are pregnant or who are children, and can meet the definition of "lawfully residing" in the United States. Special rules apply to several limited noncitizen categories: certain "cross-border" American Indians, Hmong/Highland Laotians, parolees and conditional entrants, and cases of abuse.

Aliens outside the United States who seek to obtain visas at U.S. consulates overseas or admission at U.S. ports of entry are generally denied entry if they are deemed "likely at any time to become a public charge". Aliens within the United States who seek to adjust their status to that of lawful permanent resident (LPR), or who entered the United States without inspection, are also generally subject to exclusion and deportation on public charge grounds. Similarly, LPRs and other aliens who have been admitted to the United States are removable if they become a public charge within five years after the date of their entry due to causes that preexisted their entry.

A 1999 policy letter from immigration officials defined "public charge" and identified which benefits are considered in public charge determinations, and the policy letter underlies current regulations and other guidance on the public charge grounds of inadmissibility and deportability. Collectively, the various sources addressing the meaning of public charge have historically suggested that an alien's receipt of public benefits, per se, is unlikely to result in the alien being deemed to be removable on public charge grounds.

=== Children and SCHIP ===
A child may be eligible for Medicaid regardless of the eligibility status of his parents. Thus, a child may be covered by Medicaid based on his individual status even if his parents are not eligible. Similarly, if a child lives with someone other than a parent, he may still be eligible based on its individual status.

One-third of children and over half (59%) of low-income children are insured through Medicaid or SCHIP. The insurance provides them with access to preventive and primary services which are used at a much higher rate than for the uninsured, but still below the utilization of privately insured patients. As of 2014, rate of uninsured children was reduced to 6% (5 million children remain uninsured).

=== HIV ===
Medicaid provided the largest portion of federal money spent on health care for people living with HIV/AIDS until the implementation of Medicare Part D, when the cost of prescription drugs for those eligible for both Medicare and Medicaid was shifted to Medicare. Unless low income people who are HIV positive meet some other eligibility category, they are not eligible for Medicaid assistance unless they can qualify under the "disabled" category to receive Medicaid assistance—for example, if they progress to AIDS (T-cell count drops below 200). The Medicaid eligibility policy differs from Journal of the American Medical Association (JAMA) guidelines, which recommend therapy for all patients with T-cell counts of 350 or less and even certain patients with a higher T-cell count. Due to the high costs associated with HIV medications, many patients are not able to begin antiretroviral treatment without Medicaid help. It is estimated that more than half of people living with AIDS in the United States receive Medicaid payments. Two other programs that provide financial assistance to people living with HIV/AIDS are the Social Security Disability Insurance (SSDI) and the Supplemental Security Income programs.

== Adjudication and appeals ==
Claims processing, eligibility determinations, and initial coverage decisions are administered by state Medicaid agencies under federally approved state plans. Provider and beneficiary appeals are governed by state administrative procedures within federal requirements, with federal law requiring states to offer fair hearings for coverage and eligibility disputes. Medicaid managed care organizations (MCOs) must resolve appeals within specified timeframes, provide continuation of benefits pending appeal in certain circumstances, and offer access to a state fair hearing after exhausting the MCO's internal process.

The HHS Departmental Appeals Board (DAB), including its appellate and administrative law judge divisions, reviews appeals by states challenging CMS disallowances of federal financial participation (FFP) under Medicaid, involving cost allowability, statutory compliance, matching rates, claiming methodologies, and interpretation of Medicaid requirements, and reviews HHS enforcement actions against providers and suppliers where regulations route appeals to it. This includes civil monetary penalties, OIG exclusions from federal health care programs, provider terminations, survey and certification enforcement, and related sanctions under Medicare and Medicaid conditions of participation. Much of that work initially goes through DAB administrative law judges or the Civil Remedies Division, with Board review available in certain cases.

== Utilization ==
During 2003–2012, the share of hospital stays billed to Medicaid increased by 2.5%, or 0.8 million stays. As of 2019, Medicaid paid for half of all births in the United States.

Medicaid super utilizers (defined as Medicaid patients with four or more admissions in one year) account for more hospital stays (5.9 vs.1.3 stays), longer lengths of stay (6.1 vs. 4.5 days), and higher hospital costs per stay ($11,766 vs. $9,032). Medicaid super-utilizers were more likely than other Medicaid patients to be male and to be aged 45–64 years. Common conditions among super-utilizers include mood disorders and psychiatric disorders, as well as diabetes, cancer treatment, sickle cell anemia, sepsis, congestive heart failure, chronic obstructive pulmonary disease, and complications of devices, implants, and grafts.

== Budget and financing ==
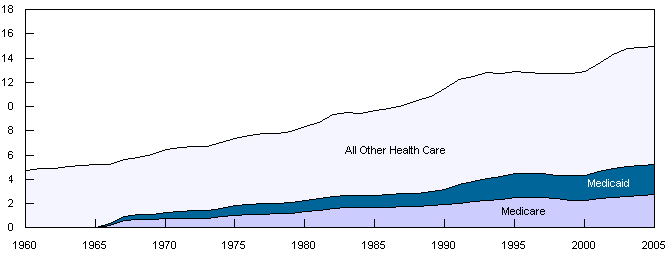
Medicaid spending as part of total U.S. healthcare spending (public and private). Percent of gross domestic product (GDP). Congressional Budget Office chart.

Unlike Medicare, which is solely a federal program, Medicaid is a joint federal-state program. Each state administers its own Medicaid system that must conform to federal guidelines for the state to receive Federal matching funds. Financing of Medicaid in the American Samoa, Puerto Rico, Guam, and the U.S. Virgin Islands is instead implemented through a block grant. The Federal government matches state funding according to the Federal Medical Assistance Percentages. The wealthiest states only receive a federal match of 50% while poorer states receive a larger match. Some scholars contend that the match rates are political as the formula used to calculate match rates disproportionately benefits states represented by powerful members of Congress.

Medicaid funding has become a major budgetary issue for many states over the last few years, with states, on average, spending 16.8% of state general funds on the program. If the federal match expenditure is also counted, the program, on average, takes up 22% of each state's budget. Some 43 million Americans were enrolled in 2004 (19.7 million of them children) at a total cost of $295 billion. In 2008, Medicaid provided health coverage and services to approximately 49 million low-income children, pregnant women, elderly people, and disabled people. Federal Medicaid outlays were estimated to be $204 billion in 2008. In 2011, there were 7.6 million hospital stays billed to Medicaid, representing 15.6% (approximately $60.2 billion) of total aggregate inpatient hospital costs in the United States. At $8,000, the mean cost per stay billed to Medicaid was $2,000 less than the average cost for all stays.

Medicaid does not pay benefits to individuals directly; Medicaid sends benefit payments to health care providers. In some states Medicaid beneficiaries are required to pay a small fee (co-payment) for medical services. Medicaid is limited by federal law to the coverage of "medically necessary services".

On November 25, 2008, a new federal rule was passed that allows states to charge premiums and higher co-payments to Medicaid participants. This rule enabled states to take in greater revenues, limiting financial losses associated with the program. Estimates figure that states will save $1.1 billion while the federal government will save nearly $1.4 billion. However, this meant that the burden of financial responsibility would be placed on 13 million Medicaid recipients who faced a $1.3 billion increase in co-payments over 5 years. The major concern is that this rule will create a disincentive for low-income people to seek healthcare. It is possible that this will force only the sickest participants to pay the increased premiums and it is unclear what long-term effect this will have on the program.

A 2019 study found that Medicaid expansion in Michigan had net positive fiscal effects for the state.

=== Medicaid estate recovery ===
Since the Medicaid program was established in 1965, "states have been permitted to recover from the estates of deceased Medicaid recipients who were over age 65 when they received benefits and who had no surviving spouse, minor child, or adult disabled child." In 1993, Congress enacted the Omnibus Budget Reconciliation Act of 1993, which required states to attempt to recoup "the expense of long-term care and related costs for deceased Medicaid recipients 55 or older." The Act allowed states to recover other Medicaid expenses for deceased Medicaid recipients 55 or older, at each state's choice. However, states were prohibited from estate recovery when "there is a surviving spouse, a child under the age of 21 or a child of any age who is blind or disabled." The Act also carved out other exceptions for adult children who have served as caretakers in the homes of the deceased, property owned jointly by siblings, and income-producing property, such as farms." Each state now maintains a Medicaid estate recovery program, although the sum of money collected significantly varies from state to state, "depending on how the state structures its program and how vigorously it pursues collections."

== Effects ==
=== Coverage gains ===
A 2019 review by Kaiser Family Foundation of 324 studies on Medicaid expansion concluded that "expansion is linked to gains in coverage; improvements in access, financial security, and some measures of health status/outcomes; and economic benefits for states and providers."

=== Mortality and disability reduction ===
A 2021 study found that Medicaid expansion as part of the Affordable Care Act led to a substantial reduction in mortality, primarily driven by reductions in disease-related deaths. A 2018 study in the Journal of Political Economy found that upon its introduction, Medicaid reduced infant and child mortality in the 1960s and 1970s. The decline in the mortality rate for nonwhite children was particularly steep. A 2018 study in the American Journal of Public Health found that the infant mortality rate declined in states that had Medicaid expansions (as part of the Affordable Care Act) whereas the rate rose in states that declined Medicaid expansion. A 2020 JAMA study found that Medicaid expansion under the ACA was associated with reduced incidence of advanced-stage breast cancer, indicating that Medicaid accessibility led to early detection of breast cancer and higher survival rates. A 2020 study found no evidence that Medicaid expansion adversely affected the quality of health care given to Medicare recipients. A 2018 study found that Medicaid expansions in New York, Arizona, and Maine in the early 2000s caused a 6% decline in the mortality rate: "HIV-related mortality (affected by the recent introduction of antiretrovirals) accounted for 20% of the effect. Mortality changes were closely linked to county-level coverage gains, with one life saved annually for every 239 to 316 adults gaining insurance. The results imply a cost per life saved ranging from $327,000 to $867,000 which compares favorably with most estimates of the value of a statistical life."

A 2016 paper found that Medicaid has substantial positive long-term effects on the health of recipients: "Early childhood Medicaid eligibility reduces mortality and disability and, for whites, increases extensive margin labor supply, and reduces receipt of disability transfer programs and public health insurance up to 50 years later. Total income does not change because earnings replace disability benefits." The government recoups its investment in Medicaid through savings on benefit payments later in life and greater payment of taxes because recipients of Medicaid are healthier: "The government earns a discounted annual return of between 2% and 7% on the original cost of childhood coverage for these cohorts, most of which comes from lower cash transfer payments." A 2019 National Bureau of Economic Research paper found that when Hawaii stopped allowing Compact of Free Association (COFA) migrants to be covered by the state's Medicaid program that Medicaid-funded hospitalizations declined by 69% and emergency room visits declined by 42% for this population, but that uninsured ER visits increased and that Medicaid-funded ER visits by infants substantially increased. Another NBER paper found that Medicaid expansion reduced mortality.

A 2021 American Economic Review study found that early childhood access to Medicaid "reduces mortality and disability, increases employment, and reduces receipt of disability transfer programs up to 50 years later. Medicaid has saved the government more than its original cost and saved more than 10 million quality adjusted life years."

=== Rural hospitals boosted revenue ===
A 2020 study found that Medicaid expansion boosted the revenue and operating margins of rural hospitals, had no impact on small urban hospitals, and led to declines in revenue for large urban hospitals. A 2021 study found that expansions of adult Medicaid dental coverage increasingly led dentists to locate to poor, previously underserved areas. A 2019 paper by Stanford University and Wharton School economists found that Medicaid expansion "produced a substantial increase in hospital revenue and profitability, with larger gains for government hospitals. On the benefits side, we do not detect significant improvements in patient health, although the expansion led to substantially greater hospital and emergency room use, and a reallocation of care from public to private and better-quality hospitals."

=== Financial and health security increase ===
A 2017 survey of the academic research on Medicaid found it improved recipients' health and financial security. Studies have linked Medicaid expansion with increases in employment levels and student status among enrollees. A 2017 paper found that Medicaid expansion under the Affordable Care Act "reduced unpaid medical bills sent to collection by $3.4 billion in its first two years, prevented new delinquencies, and improved credit scores. Using data on credit offers and pricing, we document that improvements in households' financial health led to better terms for available credit valued at $520 million per year. We calculate that the financial benefits of Medicaid double when considering these indirect benefits in addition to the direct reduction in out-of-pocket expenditures." Studies have found that Medicaid expansion reduced rates of poverty and severe food insecurity in certain states. Studies on the implementation of work requirements for Medicaid in Arkansas found that it led to an increase in uninsured individuals, medical debt, and delays in seeking care and taking medications, without any significant impact on employment. A 2021 study in the American Journal of Public Health found that Medicaid expansion in Louisiana led to reductions in medical debt.

=== Political participation increase ===
A 2017 study found that Medicaid enrollment increases political participation (measured in terms of voter registration and turnout).

=== Crime reduction ===
Studies have found that Medicaid expansion reduced crime. The proposed mechanisms for the reduction were that Medicaid increased the economic security of individuals and provided greater access to treatment for substance abuse or behavioral disorders. A 2022 study found that Medicaid eligibility during childhood reduced the likelihood of criminality during early adulthood.

=== Oregon Medicaid health experiment and controversy ===
In 2008, Oregon decided to hold a randomized lottery for the provision of Medicaid insurance in which 10,000 lower-income people eligible for Medicaid were chosen by a randomized system. The lottery enabled studies to accurately measure the impact of health insurance on an individual's health and eliminate potential selection bias in the population enrolling in Medicaid.

A sequence of two high-profile studies by a team from the Massachusetts Institute of Technology and the Harvard School of Public Health found that "Medicaid coverage generated no significant improvements in measured physical health outcomes in the first 2 years", but did "increase use of health care services, raise rates of diabetes detection and management, lower rates of depression, and reduce financial strain."

The study found that in the first year:

1. Hospital use increased by 30% for those with insurance, with the length of hospital stays increasing by 30% and the number of procedures increasing by 45% for the population with insurance;
2. Medicaid recipients proved more likely to seek preventive care. Women were 60% more likely to have mammograms and recipients overall were 20% more likely to have their cholesterol checked;
3. In terms of self-reported health outcomes, having insurance was associated with an increased probability of reporting one's health as "good", "very good", or "excellent"—overall, about 25% higher than the average;
4. Those with insurance were about 10% less likely to report a diagnosis of depression.
5. Patients with catastrophic health spending (with costs that were greater than 30% of income) dropped.
6. Medicaid patients had cut in half the probability of requiring loans or forgoing other bills to pay for medical costs.

The studies spurred a debate between proponents of expanding Medicaid coverage and fiscal conservatives challenging the value of this expansive government program.

== Political influences ==
Several political factors influence the cost and eligibility of tax-funded health care. According to a study conducted by Gideon Lukens, factors significantly affecting eligibility included "party control, the ideology of state citizens, the prevalence of women in legislatures, the line-item veto, and physician interest group size." Lukens' study supported the generalized hypothesis that Democrats favor generous eligibility policies while Republicans do not. When the Supreme Court allowed states to decide whether to expand Medicaid or not in 2012, northern states, in which Democratic legislators predominated, disproportionately did so, often also extending existing eligibility.

Certain states in which there is a Republican-controlled legislature may be forced to expand Medicaid in ways extending beyond increasing existing eligibility in the form of waivers for certain Medicaid requirements so long as they follow certain objectives. In its implementation, this has meant using Medicaid funds to pay for low-income citizens' health insurance; this private-option was originally carried out in Arkansas but was adopted by other Republican-led states. However, private coverage is more expensive than Medicaid and the states would not have to contribute as much to the cost of private coverage.

The distribution of Medicaid funding to states is also political. The members of Congress who designed the program purposely manipulated the funding formula to direct more funding to their states.

== See also ==
- Center for Medicare and Medicaid Innovation
- Enhanced Primary Care Case Management Program
- Medicaid estate recovery
- Medicaid Home and Community-Based Services Waivers
- Medicare for All Act
- Social policy
- State Children's Health Insurance Program (SCHIP/CHIP)
