= Medicaid estate recovery =

Required process under US federal law

Medicaid estate recovery is a required process under United States federal law in which state governments adjust (settle) or recover the cost of care and services from the estates of those who received Medicaid benefits after they die. By law, states may not settle any payments until after the beneficiary's death. States are required to adjust or recover all costs under certain circumstances, all involving long-term care arrangements. Federal law also gives states the option to adjust or recover the costs of all payments to health care providers except Medicare cost-sharing for anyone on Medicaid over the age of 55.

== Details ==
States are required to recover long-term-care-related (LTCR) Medicaid expenses from people who are 55 or older and have received Medicaid from the recipients' probate estates.

States also have the option to recover costs of all other Medicaid services for people who are 55 or older and have a separate option to extend the recovery beyond probate estates. That is known as "expanded estate recovery."

Recovered amounts may include capitation charges as to whether or not medical services were used, as well as expenses that are directly paid under Medicaid to the service provider for services used.

The scope of the recovery includes "traditional" Medicaid (referring to the versions of Medicaid that existed prior to the Affordable Care Act (ACA)), as well as to the expanded Medicaid introduced by the ACA.

States may not recover from the estate of a deceased Medicaid enrollee who is survived by a spouse or a child who is under 21, blind, or disabled. States are also required to establish procedures for waiving estate recovery when recovery would cause an undue hardship.

States may impose a lien for Medicaid benefits that are incorrectly paid pursuant to a court judgment. States may also impose liens on real property during the lifetime of a Medicaid enrollee who is permanently institutionalized. States must remove the lien when the Medicaid enrollee is discharged from the facility and returns home.

== History ==
States have been authorized to implement estate recovery programs since 1965, when Medicaid first began. However, prior to 1990, only 12 of the states had established Medicaid estate recovery programs.

The federal government has made it a requirement for states to implement an estate recovery program for Medicaid in the Omnibus Budget Reconciliation Act of 1993. That was done with primary concern towards recipients who received long-term care services, which had required the applicant to have very low asset levels.

The Act allowed recipients and their spouses to retain a home and certain other modest assets, to avoid their total impoverishment, while they are alive. Estate recovery collected the assets from the estate when both recipient and spouse had deceased. The Act also gave states the option of recovering other Medicaid expenses.

== Non-LTCR estate recovery and ACA ==
=== View that non-LTCR recovery is problematic ===
The view that there were problematic aspects of the interaction of non-LTCR Medicaid estate recovery with the ACA has been put forth in various places since the ACA was passed, and stemmed from the fact that much of the coverage made available under the ACA is Medicaid, which is subject to estate recovery for people 55 and older, in a number of states.

The ACA was designed to make available and promoted as allowing affordable health insurance to all people without other forms of insurance.

It attempts to make the insurance available (for the case of US citizens) by retaining existing Medicaid programs ("traditional Medicaid," which generally required both low incomes and very low asset levels); by starting a new class of Medicaid for people with Modified Adjusted Gross Incomes (MAGIs) no more than 138% of the Federal Poverty Level (FPL) and having no maximum asset levels; by offering people with all income levels access to on-exchange insurance plans from private insurers; and by offering sliding-scale income-based subsidies for those with MAGIs above 100% of the FPL to 400% of the FPL, provided they are not eligible for either a traditional Medicaid or expanded Medicaid, a Children's Health Insurance Program (CHIP), or an employer's or a family member's employer's insurance program.

One aspect of that point of view that was raised noted the goal of providing health insurance is interfered with if states exercise their option to recover costs of all medical care (not just LTCR) for people 55 or older. People getting Medicaid do not have the protections normally associated with health insurance.

People 55 or older getting Medicaid are not eligible to receive a subsidy on an ACA on-exchange plan, but they have an option of purchasing an ACA on-exchange plan without a subsidy. However, that option may be unaffordable since the class of people involved often has a MAGI at or below 138% of the FPL.

An additional problematic aspect of the estate recovery of non-LTCR expenses that was brought up was the unequal treatment of people below 138% of the FPL under the ACA, who get expanded Medicaid and are subject to estate recovery if they are 55 or older, and people just above 138% of the FPL, who get highly subsidized, very-low-net-cost, on-exchange insurance, which is not subject to estate recovery.

Another aspect raised was that people, under the ACA, had to be covered under threat of a financial penalty unless they were covered, but for many people, the only affordable coverage available was Medicaid. That came often with capitation charges against the person's estate, even if medical services were unused, and with a risk of large payments for medical services used if the person got sick and had to be paid back by the estate.

The federal mandate has been removed since the start of 2019; that aspect continues to have relevance in states that have their own financial penalties for not carrying coverage, which include New Jersey, Massachusetts, and the District of Columbia among states that currently do estate recovery of non-LTCR Medicaid expenses.

In a January 2014 Washington Post article, Matt Salo, executive director of the National Association of Medicaid Directors, responded to the issues by indicating, "It wouldn’t make sense for a state to pursue a claim on the property of a new [expanded] Medicaid recipient under the health-care law." He added, “There’s no way any state is going to see it as cost-effective or politically sensible to do that.” However, state Medicaid spokespersons for both New Jersey and Minnesota made contradictory assertions that indicated their states intended to continue the estate recovery of all medical expenses for all Medicaid recipients. As of August 2019, at least 12 states that have expanded Medicaid: Massachusetts, New Jersey, Iowa, Nevada, New Hampshire, North Dakota, Ohio, Rhode Island, Indiana, Utah, Maryland, and the District of Columbia maintain the estate recovery of all medical expenses for expanded Medicaid recipients in their laws and regulations.)

In late February 2014, two months after the main ACA provisions went into effect, the Obama administration's Center for Medicare and Medicaid Services (CMS) issued a letter stating, “CMS intends to thoroughly explore options and to use any available authorities to eliminate recovery of Medicaid benefits consisting of items or services other than long term care and related services in the case of individuals who are determined eligible for Medicaid benefits using the MAGI methodology." "MAGI methodology" for Medicaid eligibility refers to roughly those people added to Medicaid in expanded Medicaid.

=== Argument for non-LTCR estate recovery since ACA ===
Medicaid estate recovery documents from the various states with estate recovery of non-LTCR expenses often explain the purpose of their estate recovery program. For example, a New Jersey document stated, "DMAHS pursues recovery from estates to supplement funds available for medical assistance programs and limit the burden upon taxpayers caused by rising medical costs. Funds recovered help provide assistance to others in need."

It can be argued that the justifications were written before the ACA main provisions went into effect in 2014 and do not account for the changes in who is affected by the recovery since the ACA. As well, the ACA may reflect a changed attitude intended in the law, that affordable health insurance should be available to all as an expected matter of national policy.some may consider it important to examine justifications under the assumption of expanded Medicaid.

The argument to continue non-LTCR estate recovery was expressed by an assistant commissioner for the Minnesota Department of Human Services, a state that had expanded Medicaid: “The general idea here is that people with assets should help contribute to the cost of their coverage, Many have incurred thousands of dollars of medical expenses at taxpayer expense. That’s the reason for these recoveries. It’s not intended to be punitive.”

=== Post-ACA adjustments to recovery regulations ===
==== State regulation adjustments stopping non-LTCR Estate Recovery ====
Prior to the ACA main provisions going into effect on January 1, 2014, a number of Medicaid expansion states had had laws and regulations that underwent non-LTCR estate recovery and have stopped or limited the practice but not necessarily permanently:

- New York (starting April 1, 2014)
- Connecticut (retroactive to ACA main provisions start; expanded Medicaid only; not extending to all non-long-term-care related)
- Washington (at ACA main provisions start)
- Oregon (at ACA main provisions start)
- California (2017)
- Minnesota (2017) Minnesota has language on the signature page of its ACA application that may leave open its option to estate recover from current Medicaid recipients if it changes its laws or regulations in the future, and/or to recover from Medicaid recipients in future years on ACA auto-renewals.
- Colorado

In addition, there are some Medicaid expansion states without non-LTCR Medicaid estate recovery and still without it (such as Pennsylvania).

==== States maintaining non-LTCR estate recovery ====
In other Medicaid expansion states with non-LTCR Medicaid estate recovery just prior to the ACA main provisions, such as Massachusetts, New Jersey, Iowa, Nevada, New Hampshire, North Dakota, Ohio, Rhode Island, Indiana, Idaho, Utah, and Maryland, as well as in the District of Columbia, the recovery of non-LTCR persists.
