= Medicaid managed care =

U.S. Medicaid healthcare services contracting program

Medicaid managed care Medicaid and additional services in the United States through an arrangement between a state Medicaid agency and managed care organizations (MCOs) that accept a set payment – "capitation" – for these services. As of 2014, 26 states have contracts with MCOs to deliver long-term care for the elderly and individuals with disabilities. There are two main forms of Medicaid managed care, "risk-based MCOs" and "primary care case management (PCCM)."

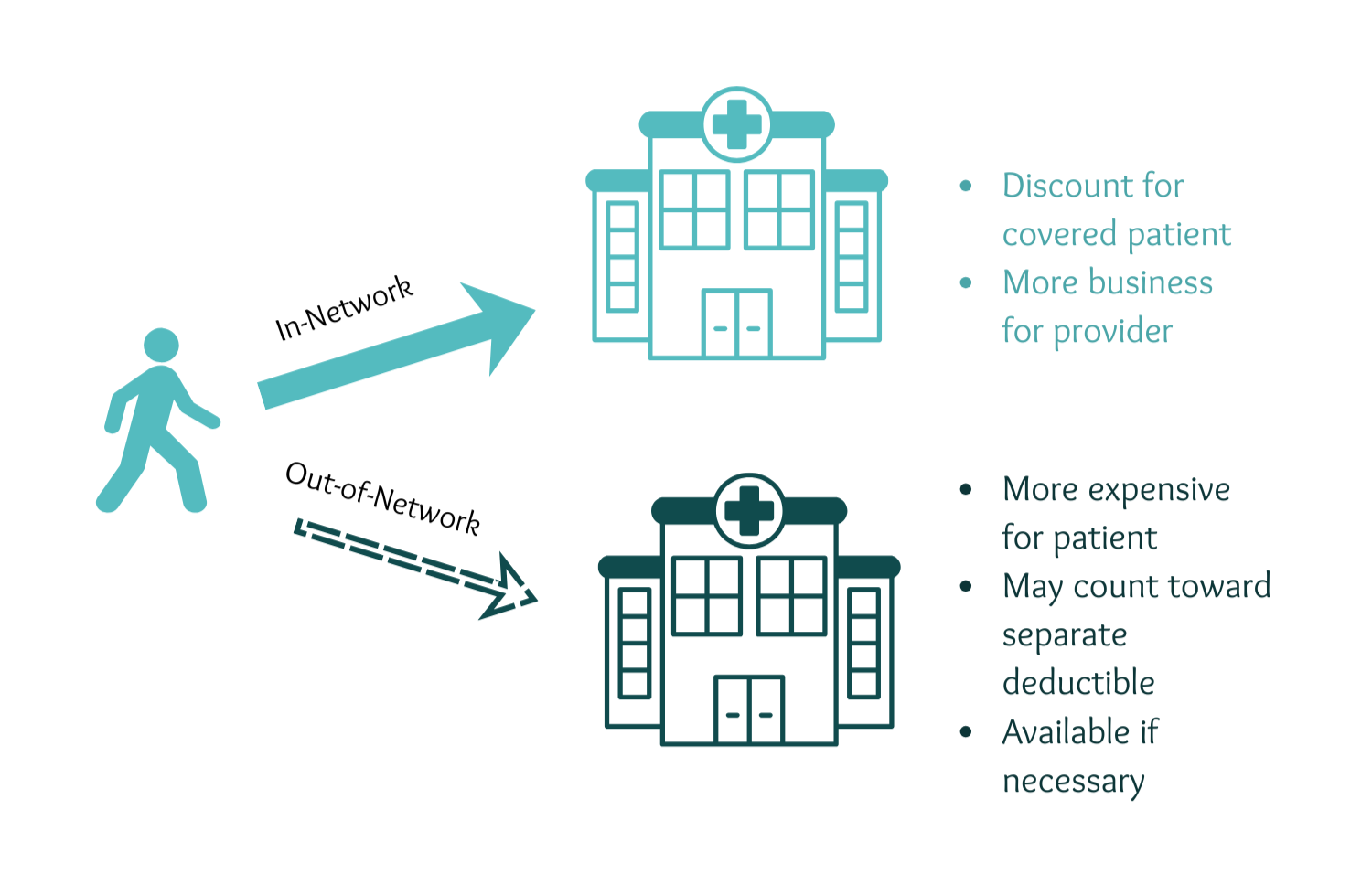
Managed care is known for using in-network and out-of-network providers to try to reduce cost of services. This reduces patients' choices in providers but may be cheaper than other non-single-payer options, such as point-of-service plans.

Managed care delivery systems grew rapidly in the Medicaid program during the 1990s. In 1991, 2.7 million beneficiaries were enrolled in some form of managed care. Currently, managed care is the most common health care delivery system in Medicaid. In 2007, nearly two-thirds of all Medicaid beneficiaries are enrolled in some form of managed care – mostly, traditional health maintenance organizations (HMO) and primary care case management (PCCM) arrangements. This amounted to 29 million beneficiaries, of which 19 million individuals were covered by fully capitated arrangements and 5.8 million were enrolled in Primary Care Case Management.

During this time, states increasingly turned to health plans already serving the public coverage programs such as Medicaid and SCHIP to operationalize expansions of coverage to uninsured populations. States used health plans as a platform for expansions and reforms because of their track record of controlling costs in public coverage programs while improving the quality of and access to care.

A variety of different types of health plans serve Medicaid managed care programs, including for-profit and not-for-profit, Medicaid-focused and commercial, independent and owned by health care providers such as community health centers. In 2007, 350 health plans offered Medicaid coverage. Of those, 147 were Medicaid-focused health plans that specialize in serving the unique needs of Medicaid and other public program beneficiaries. Over 11 million are enrolled in Medicaid focused health plans .

All states except Alaska, and Wyoming have all, or a portion of, their Medicaid population enrolled in an MCO. States can make managed care enrollment voluntary or seek a waiver from CMS to require certain populations to enroll in an MCO. If states provide a choice of at least two plans, they can mandate enrollment in managed care.

Healthy children and families make up the majority of Medicaid managed care enrollees, but an increasing number of states are expanding managed care to previously excluded groups, such as people with disabilities, pregnant women, and children in foster care. In 2003, Hudson Health Plan implemented a patient-specific pay for performance (P4P) model to increase immunization rates and diabetes care for Medicaid managed care recipients.

== See also ==
- Enhanced Primary Care Case Management Program
