= Four Thieves =

Four Thieves may refer to:

- Four thieves vinegar, a traditional medicine
- Four Thieves Vinegar Collective, a biohacking collective
