= Epinephrine autoinjector =

Medical device

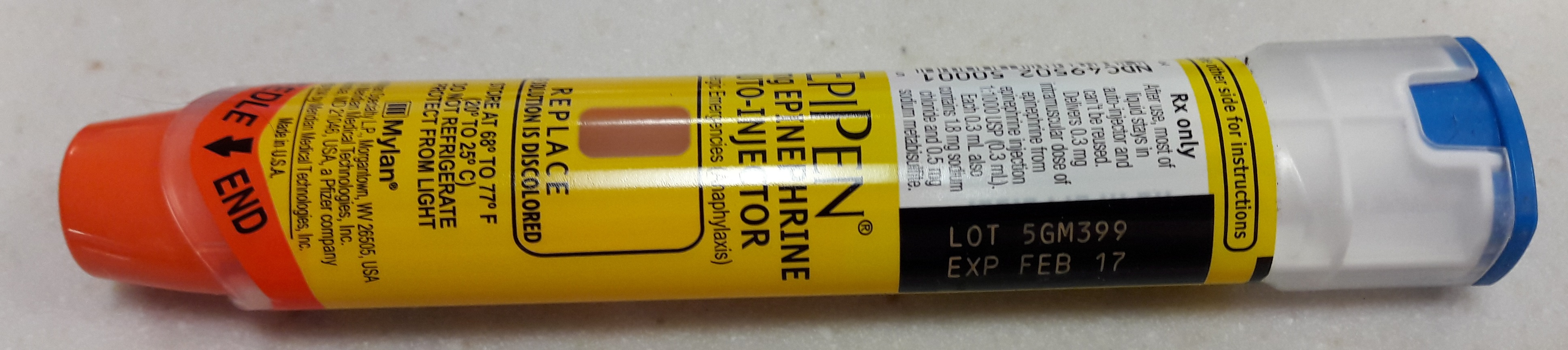
- Mylan 0.3 mg EpiPen, epinephrine autoinjector
- Other names: EpiPen
- Specialty: Emergency medicine
- Uses: Anaphylaxis
- Types: Adult: 0.3 mg; Pediatric: 0.15 mg

An epinephrine autoinjector (or adrenaline autoinjector, also known by the trademark EpiPen) is a medical device for injecting a measured dose or doses of epinephrine (adrenaline) by means of autoinjector technology. It is most often used for the treatment of anaphylaxis. The first epinephrine autoinjector was brought to market in 1983.

== Medical uses ==
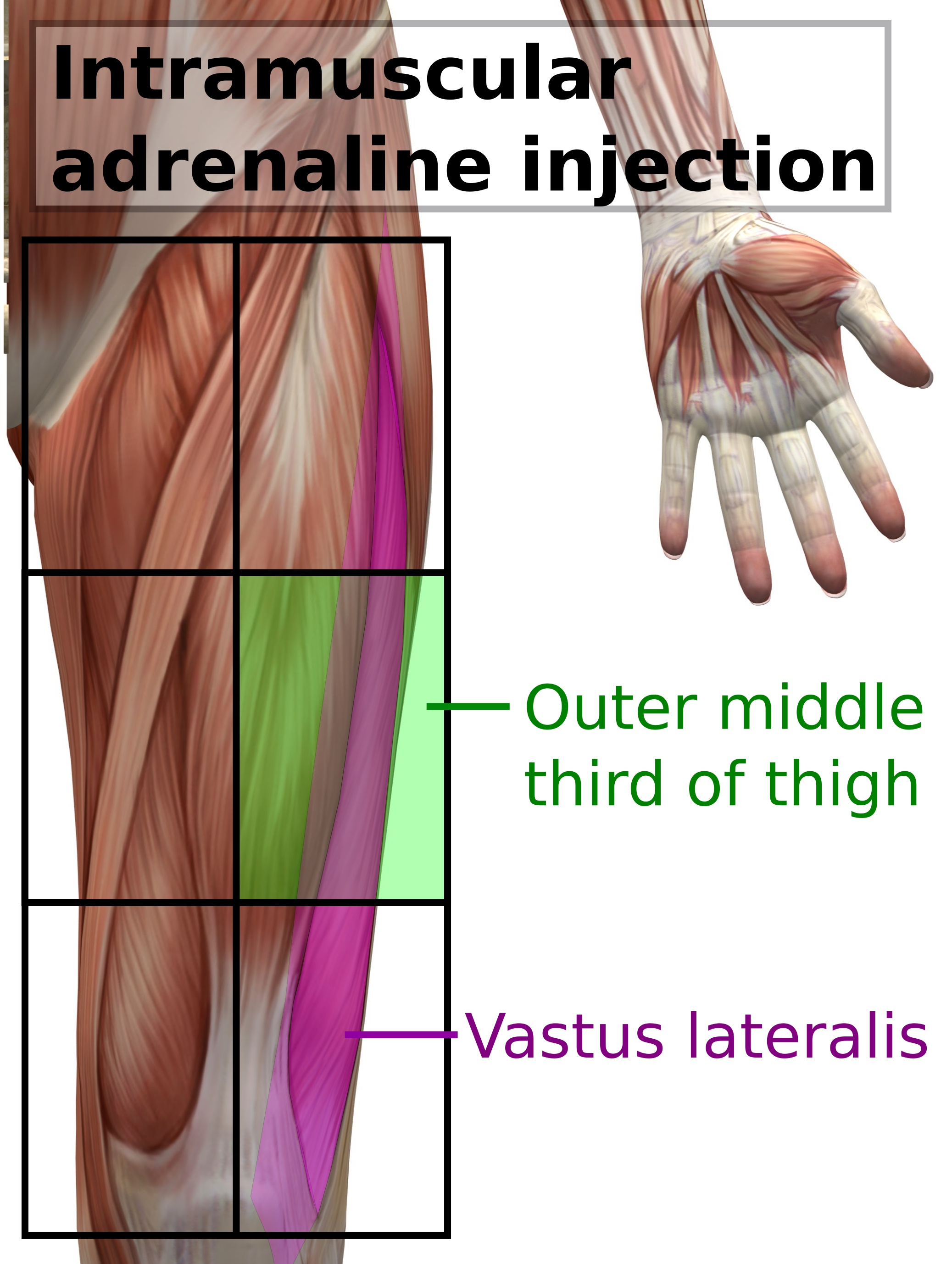
Vastus lateralis site for intramuscular injection

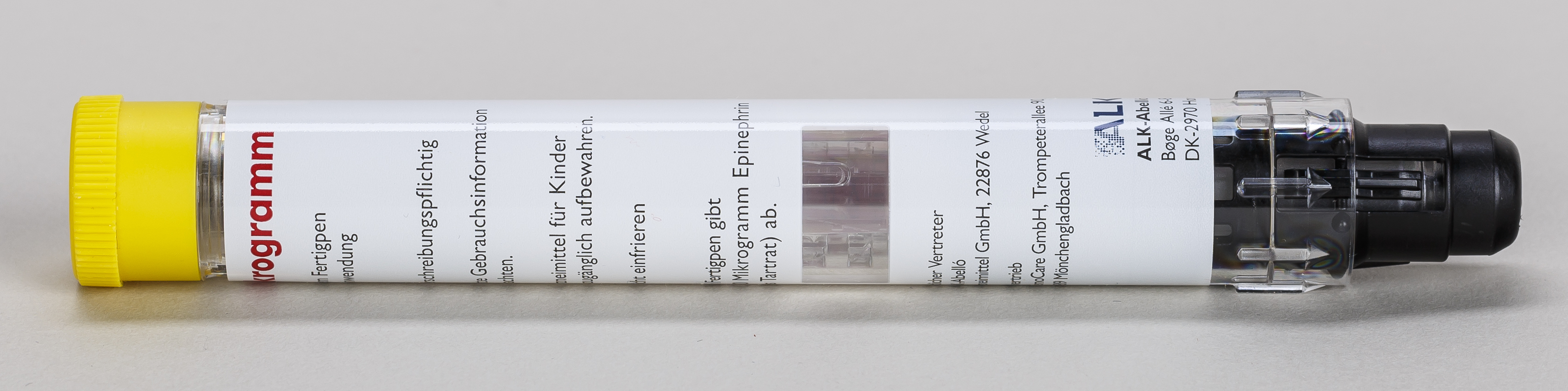
ALK Pharma Jext300, adrenaline autoinjector, without its safety cover

Epinephrine autoinjectors are hand-held devices carried by those who have severe allergies; the epinephrine delivered by the device is an emergency treatment for anaphylaxis.

When anaphylaxis is suspected, epinephrine solution should be given as soon as possible as an intramuscular injection, in the middle of the outer side of the thigh, which corresponds to the location of the vastus lateralis muscle. The injection may be repeated every 5 to 15 minutes if there is insufficient response. A second dose is needed in 16–35% of episodes with more than two doses rarely required; in around 80% of the cases where a second dose is administered, it is by a medical professional. It is not clear which are the people who might need a second injection at the outset. The intramuscular route is preferred over subcutaneous administration because the latter may have delayed absorption. Minor adverse effects from epinephrine include tremors, anxiety, headaches, and palpitations.

The epinephrine in autoinjectors expires after one year. A study in rabbits showed that intramuscular epinephrine has decreased effectiveness after it expires; that study also recommended that if the drug in an expired device has not started to precipitate (if the solution is not cloudy and has no particles in it) using the expired device is better than no injection at all in an emergency situation.

== Design ==
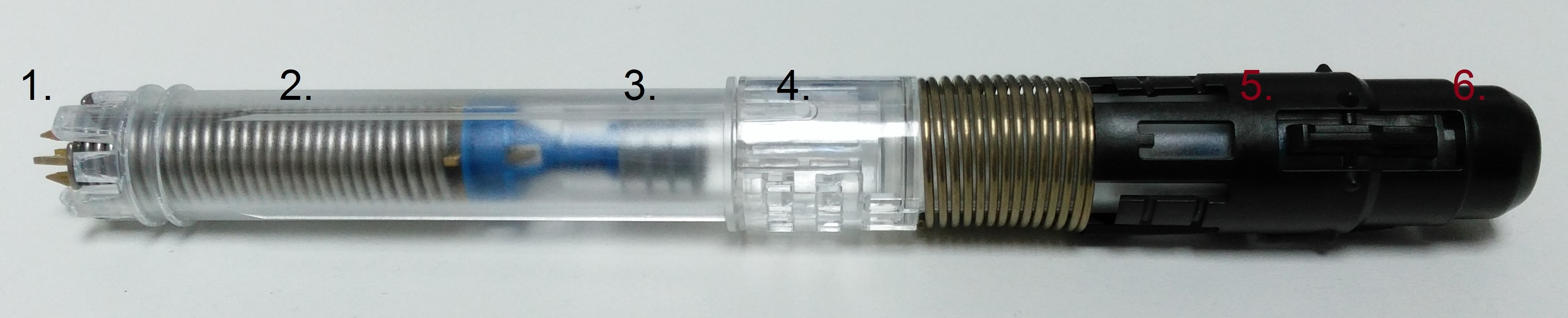
The inner mechanism of an epinephrine autoinjector. 1. Four latch mechanisms that hold the plunger secure. 2. Loaded spring that drives the plunger and the needle (toward the right). 3. Plunger. 4. Adrenaline solution. 5. Outer body. When retracted upward (left) exposes the needle and triggers the latch mechanism. Later springs back to cover the needle after use. 6. Needle exits through a protective barrier when this is pressed against the skin.

The devices contain a fixed dose of epinephrine and a spring-loaded needle (or, in the case of AuviQ, a CO_{2}-driven needle) that exits the tip or edge of the device and penetrates the recipient's skin, to deliver the medication via intramuscular injection.

People to whom epinephrine autoinjectors are prescribed need to be trained how to use the specific device prescribed. The rate of unintentional injections using these devices is unknown but a 2009 review found that the rate is increasing. Unintentional injections are delivered to a finger or thumb around 90% of the time; they cause intense pain locally but usually completely resolve. The cause of unintentional injections has been attributed to design flaws, where the device is mistaken for a pen or the user mistakes which end of the device contains the needle.

The European Medicines Agency conducted a review of the safety of devices then on the market and found several factors that determine whether the devices successfully deliver drug into muscle, including "needle length, the thickness of fat under the skin, the way the auto-injector works (e.g., if it is spring loaded or not), the angle at which the device is placed on the skin and the force used to activate the device as well as how well the user follows the instructions for injection." It found that how well the user was trained was the most important factor determining successful delivery, and requested companies to develop better training materials for doctors and people to whom the devices are prescribed.

An injection of Auvi-Q autoinjector

In 2013, emergency physician Seth C. Hawkins and coauthors published a technique for obtaining multiple additional doses of epinephrine from used, single dose autoinjectors EpiPen and Adrenaclick. It was emphasized this was an emergency adaptation of the intended design for austere environments when no additional epinephrine was available. In 2016, Robinson and Lareau published a similar technique adapted to used AuviQ autoinjectors.

== History ==
=== Product introduction ===
Autoinjectors were originally developed for the rapid administration of nerve gas antidotes in kits like the Mark I NAAK. The first modern epinephrine autoinjector, the EpiPen, was invented in the mid-1970s at Survival Technology in Bethesda, Maryland, US by Sheldon Kaplan and was first approved for marketing by the FDA in 1987.

One of the people who helped in making the EpiPen was Richard B. Toren. He had the idea to use this technology for allergic reactions because his daughter was allergic to bees and had to carry around a complex kit if she was ever stung. He then helped to slightly alter the technology in order to create EpiPen's current design.

In 1996, Survival Technology merged with a company called Brunswick Biomedical and the new company was called Meridian Medical Technologies. In 1997, Dey, a subsidiary of Merck KGaA, acquired the exclusive right to market and distribute the EpiPen. In 1998 there was a recall of one million EpiPens, the second such recall in a year.

In 2001 Meridian and Dey introduced a two-pack version of the EpiPen; at that time the device had $23.9 million in annual sales and accounted for 75% of the market in the United States. In 2002 King Pharmaceuticals acquired Meridian for $247.8 million in cash; the deal was completed in January 2003. Kaplan continued to improve his designs over the years, filing for example US Patent 6,767,336 in 2003.

In 2003, Hollister-Stier received approval from the FDA to market an epinephrine autoinjector called Twinject that could deliver two shots of epinephrine, which it had spent ten years developing. In 2005, it sold the product to Verus Pharmaceuticals, which launched the product the same year. In March 2008, Sciele Pharma acquired Twinject from Verus and later that year, Sciele was acquired by Shionogi.

In 2007, Mylan acquired the right to market the EpiPen from Merck KGaA as part of a larger transaction. At that time annual sales were around $200 million and the EpiPen had about 90% of the market.

In 2009, Mylan and King started marketing a new version of EpiPen with the same basic mechanism but a stronger spring, better safety features, and clearer markings and instructions; an expert for NBC News estimated that the cost to redesign the device and packaging may have been "several million dollars" and the cost to retool the manufacturing process may have "run into the double-digit millions."

=== Market development ===
In 2009, Teva Pharmaceuticals filed an ANDA to market a generic EpiPen in collaboration with Antares Pharma Inc, a maker of injection systems; Pfizer and King sued them for infringing US Patent 7,449,012 that was due to expire in 2025; Pfizer, Mylan, and Teva settled in April 2012 in a deal that allowed Teva to start selling the device in mid-2015, pending FDA approval.

In 2009, Intelliject, a US startup developing a new epinephrine autoinjector, licensed their product to Sanofi.

King was acquired by Pfizer in 2010 for $3.6 billion in cash.

In 2010, Sciele/Shionogi faced a recall of Twinject devices and launched Adrenaclick, a modified version of the Twinject that could deliver only one dose.

In 2010, European regulators approved Twinject, and also approved a new epinephrine autoinjector made by ALK and sold under the brand name Jext. Jext was launched in the European Union in September 2011.

Also in 2010, Shionogi authorized Greenstone, the authorized generics division of Pfizer, to begin selling an authorized generic of Adrenaclick. The media noted that Pfizer, through Greenstone, was marketing a generic epinephrine autoinjector when Pfizer acquired King later that year. At that time, King and Mylan's EpiPen had 91% of the global market share for epinephrine autoinjectors and 96% of the US market.

In 2010, Pfizer and King sued Novartis' Sandoz generic unit for patent infringement after Sandoz submitted an ANDA to sell a generic EpiPen. In response, Sandoz challenged the validity of the patents, and as of July 2016 this litigation was ongoing.

In 2011, Pfizer and King sued Intelliject and Sanofi after the companies filed a 505(b)(2) New Drug Application for the product, then known as "e-cue"; Pfizer, Mylan and Sanofi settled in 2012 under a deal that allowed the device to enter the market no earlier than November 2012, pending FDA approval. In August 2012, the FDA approved the autoinjector, called "Auvi-Q" after the FDA required a name change from "e-cue". The device is equipped with a sound chip to provide electronic voice instructions to guide the user in the proper use of the device.

In 2012, Mylan launched a program called EpiPen4Schools to sell EpiPens in bulk and with discounts to schools; to participate in the program schools had to agree not to buy epinephrine autoinjectors from any other company for a year.

In December 2012, the National Association of State Boards of Education launched a policy initiative designed to "help state boards of education as they develop student health policies regarding anaphylaxis and epinephrine auto-injector access and use", and advocated for state laws protecting school from legal liability for stocking and using epinephrine autoinjectors. Gayle Conelly Manchin, mother of Mylan's CEO, Heather Bresch, had become president of the association in 2010, and shortly after had discussed donations from her "daughter's company" to the association. Manchin had been appointed to the West Virginia state school board by her husband Joe Manchin, then-governor of the state, in 2012.

In 2012, Shionogi, the manufacturer of Adrenaclick and Twinject, announced it would stop making them; it had sold the rights to the NDA to a company called Amedra Pharmaceuticals.

In June 2013, Amedra relaunched Adrenaclick. and at the same time, Lineage Therapeutics launched its authorized generic version of Adrenaclick. Lineage was a wholly owned subsidiary of Amedra that had acquired the rights to the Adrenaclick authorized generic from Greenstone/Pfizer.

After successful lobbying from Mylan, in 2013, the "School Access to Emergency Epinephrine Act" became law after passing Congress with broad and bipartisan support; it protected anyone from liability if they administered epinephrine to a child in a school (previously, only trained professionals or the affected person were allowed to administer the drug, and were open to liability), and it provided some financial incentives for schools that didn't already stock epinephrine autoinjector to start stocking them. Joe Manchin, the father of Mylan's CEO, was a senator at that time.

In January 2015 Mylan filed a citizen petition with the FDA raising concerns about TEVA's ANDA application to market a generic EpiPen and filed an additional supplement later in May; the FDA rejected the petition in June.

In March 2015, Impax Laboratories acquired the parent company of Amedra and Lineage, and placed Amedra and the Adrenaclick in its Impax Specialty Pharma division; at the same time it acquired Lineage, which it placed, along with its generic version of Adrenaclick, in its Impax Generics division.

In May 2015, the Emerade epinephrine autoinjector developed by the Swedish company Medeca was approved in Sweden and Germany; it had been approved in the UK in 2013. Also in 2015 Valeant, which had licensed the rights from Medeca, abandoned its efforts to get Emerade approved in the US.

In October 2015, Auvi-Q and Allerject devices were voluntarily recalled by Sanofi in North America. The reason stated by Sanofi was that the products had been found to potentially have inaccurate dosage delivery, which may include failure to deliver drug. In February 2016, Sanofi terminated its license to manufacture and market the Auvi-Q, leaving Kaléo (Intelliject was renamed) to consider how and whether to re-introduce the device.

The EpiPen had 89% of the market for epinephrine autoinjectors in 2015; in the first half of the year it had about 85% share and Auvi-Q had about 10% share.

In March 2016, Teva's ANDA for a generic EpiPen, which had already faced several delays, was rejected by the FDA.

In 2015 Mylan had about $1.5 billion in sales of EpiPens, which accounted for 40% of Mylan's profit. Mylan had maintained about a 90% market share since it had acquired the product, and had continually raised the price of EpiPens starting in 2009: in 2009, the wholesale price of two EpiPens was about $100; by July 2013, the price was about $265; in May 2015, it was around $461; and in May 2016, the price rose again to around $609, around a 500% jump from the price in 2009. The cost of the drug and device to Mylan as of 2016 was about $35. In the summer of 2016, as parents prepared to send their children back to school and went to pharmacies to get new EpiPens, people began to express outrage at the cost of the EpiPen and Mylan was widely and harshly criticized. In September 2016, the New York State Attorney General began an investigation into Mylan's EpiPen4Schools program in New York to determine if the program's contracts violated antitrust law and the West Virginia State Attorney General opened an investigation into whether Mylan had given the state the correct discount under the Medicaid Drug Rebate Program and subpoenaed the company when it refused to provide the documentation the state requested. In October 2016, Mylan announced a $465M settlement with the US Department of Justice over rebates paid by Mylan to states under the Medicaid Drug Rebate Program.

On 5 September 2017, FDA posted a warning letter to the manufacturer, Meridian Medical Technologies. The agency warned Meridian Medical for failing to investigate problems with the devices, recall bad batches, and follow-up on problems found. According to the FDA, the manufacturer of EpiPen devices failed to address known malfunctions in its auto-injectors even as hundreds of customer complaints rolled in and failures were linked to deaths. During an inspection, Meridian employees told inspectors that they weren't allowed to disassemble and investigate complain samples, because they were allowed to do if only it was “approved by management”.

On 16 August 2018 the FDA approved the first generic EpiPen from Teva Pharmaceuticals.

In an effort to address the supply shortage of EpiPens, on August 21, 2018 the FDA approved extending the expiration dates on some products by four months.

The Sandoz division of Novartis announced on 9 July 2019 the availability of Symjepi, a manual epinephrine injection as an alternative to autoinjectors, in 0.3 mg and 0.15 mg versions.

== Society and culture ==
=== Brands ===
As of 2015, the following epinephrine autoinjectors were available in various parts of Europe: Adrenalina WZF, Adrenaline (epinephrine) 1 in 1000 solution for injection BP auto-injector, Altellus, Anapen, Emerade, EpiPen, Fastjekt, FastPen, and Jext. As of 2018, three branded products were available in the United States: Adrenaclick, Auvi-Q, and EpiPen.

As of 2024, EpiPen is the only epinephrine autoinjector available in Canada. One generic autoinjector has been approved by Health Canada but is not marketed. From 2015 to 2020, a previous period where EpiPen was the only autoinjector marketed in Canada, production issues led to supply shortages. During a 2018 shortage of EpiPens, Health Canada temporarily permitted the importation of Auvi-Q autoinjectors from the United States.

As of 2005, epinephrine autoinjectors were not available in most of the developing world.

=== Price ===
==== Canada ====
As of May 2019, in Canada the wholesale cost of a single EpiPen is approximately CA$95.00.

==== Europe ====
As of September 2016, two EpiPens cost around $100 in France.

As of August 2025 an EpiPen costs at maximum 10€ for members of the statutory health insurance in Germany if prescribed by a doctor.

As of September 2016, two Jext autoinjectors cost users about £8.50 (US$11.64) in Britain, and the National Health Service pays around £48 (US$65.75) in order to make them available; that price was about 17 percent less than 2013.

Supplies of 150 microgram adrenaline auto-injectors were said to be “critical” in the United Kingdom in October 2018. Community pharmacists were told to prioritise supplies for children weighing 25 kg or less. Mylan identified shortages because of manufacturing problems in May 2018.

==== United States ====
In October 2016 the CEO of Mylan testified to Congress that Pfizer/King charged Mylan about $34.50 for one EpiPen. The devices deliver about $1 worth of drug. In September 2016, a Silicon Valley engineering consultancy performed a teardown analysis of the EpiPen and estimated the manufacturing and packaging costs at about $10 for a two-pack.

The EpiPen, manufactured by Meridian Medical Technologies, and marketed by Mylan, has dominated the market. In 2007 when Mylan acquired the rights to market the product, annual sales of all epinephrine autoinjectors were about $200 million and EpiPen had around 90% of the market; in 2015 the market size was around $1.5 billion and Mylan still had about 90% of the market. Mylan raised the price from around $100 for a package of two EpiPens in 2007 to around $600 in 2016. In the United Kingdom, an EpiPen costs £26.45 as of 2015. In Canada they are about 120 CAD each.

Mylan acquired the right to market the EpiPen line of epinephrine autoinjector devices from Merck KGaA as part of their 2007 deal. Heather Bresch, Mylan's CEO, saw an opportunity to increase sales in the US through marketing and advocacy, and the company launched a marketing campaign to increase awareness of the dangers of anaphylaxis for people with severe allergies that made the EpiPen brand as identified with epinephrine autoinjectors as Kleenex is for facial tissue; the company also successfully lobbied the FDA to broaden the label to include risk of anaphylaxis and in parallel, successfully lobbied Congress to generate legislation making EpiPens available in public places like defibrillators are, and hired the same people that Medtronic had worked with on defibrillator legislation to do so.

Mylan's efforts to maintain its market dominance were aided when Sanofi's competing product was recalled in November 2015 and further when Teva's generic competitor was rejected by the FDA in March 2016. By the first half of 2015, sales of EpiPen accounted for 40% of Mylan's profit. Those profits were also due in part to Mylan's continually raising the price of EpiPens starting in 2009: in 2007, the wholesale price of two EpiPens was about $100; the price was about the same in 2009; by July 2013, the price was about $265; in May 2015, it was around $461; and in May 2016, the price rose again to around $609, around a 500% jump from the price in 2009. The last price increase sparked widespread outrage in the late summer as parents prepared to send their children back to school and went to pharmacies to get new EpiPens. Some Americans responded to the high price by buying EpiPens online from pharmacies outside the US, forgoing new EpiPens and relying on their expired EpiPen, or forgoing an autoinjector altogether and having their children carry pre-loaded syringes. Former Mylan CEO, Heather Bresch testified before the U.S. Senate Special Committee on Aging to argue that the price change was "fair".

In response to criticism, Mylan increased financial assistance available for some patients to purchase EpiPens, a gesture that was called a "classic public relations move" by Harvard Medical School professor Aaron Kesselheim. The up to $300 saving cards can be used only by a small number of people who need the drug, and no one on Medicaid. They do nothing about the high price which is still being paid by insurers, who ultimately pass the cost on to consumers. In October 2016, Mylan announced a settlement with the US Department of Justice over rebates paid by Mylan to states under the Medicaid Drug Rebate Program. Questions had been raised by Congress and others about why EpiPen had been classified as a generic rather a proprietary product in the program since 1997; generic drugs have lower rebates (13%) than proprietary drugs (23%), and price hikes for generic drugs cannot be passed onto states, and a common form of pharmaceutical fraud involves misclassifying proprietary drugs as generic under the program. Under the agreement, Mylan agreed to pay a $465 million payment and to a sign a corporate integrity agreement requiring it to perform better in the future; the settlement also resolved cases brought by states related to the rebates.

As of August 2016, the authorized generic of Adrenaclick cost $142 at retail stores.

In September 2016, a group of hackers called the Four Thieves Vinegar published a video and documents describing what they call an EpiPencil, an autoinjector which can be built using off-the-shelf parts, for a claimed price tag of about $30. At its core is a repurposed insulin autoinjector. This device has not been subject to any validation by regulatory agencies.
