= Four Thieves Vinegar Collective =

Anarchist biohacking group

- Named after: Four thieves vinegar
- Formation: 2015; 11 years ago
- Founder: Michael Laufer
- Dissolved: August 4, 2026
- Legal status: Active
- Purpose: Biohacking
- Products: Misoprostol Abortion Cards, EpiPencil, MicroLab, Tooth Seal
- Website: fourthievesvinegar.org

The Four Thieves Vinegar Collective was an anarchist biohacking group which ran from 2015-2026. They have published instructions for the "EpiPencil", an epinephrine autoinjector, and the "MicroLab", a do-it-yourself (DIY) device intended to make a variety of medications as well as perform other chemistry. The medical community has criticized them for causing potential harm to patients with the DIY instructions, but Laufer claims to defend people's right to attempt their medical treatment.

== Views ==
Michael Laufer founded the project. Laufer has compared his work to that of Women on Waves, a group that provides abortion medication to women in areas where abortion is illegal. His motivation in founding the group is to provide medication to people when it is too expensive for them to afford, illegal to acquire, or unavailable due to it treating an orphan disease. He believes that providing lifesaving medication to those who need it justifies violating the intellectual property rights of pharmaceutical companies, and supports cognitive liberty.

The group bills itself as promoting development of DIY medicine as part of a larger "right to repair for your body".

== History ==
Laufer, trained in mathematics, formed the group in 2008 during a graduate school trip to El Salvador. While visiting a local medical clinic he learned that despite the existence of many clandestine chemistry labs producing methamphetamine and MDMA, the clinic was out of oral contraceptives. He investigated the possibility of DIY pharmaceuticals which culminated in the founding of Four Thieves in 2015. He took the name from four thieves vinegar, a legendary plague cure.

=== ChemHacktica ===
Four Thieves had formerly partnered with Chematica to develop recipes for the group's medication, but this ended and they lost access to information and software they had been given after pharmaceutical company Merck bought the startup. In recent years, they have instead adopted "ChemHacktica" a fork of the open-source MIT project ASKCOS.

=== EpiPencil ===
In 2016, after the price for an EpiPen was raised from $57 to $318 by its manufacturer Mylan, Four Thieves released instructions for how to build an "EpiPencil", a homemade epinephrine autoinjector that can be built for $30. It is made from three off-the-shelf parts.

=== MicroLab ===
Four Thieves has released instructions for building a "MicroLab", a DIY controlled lab reactor claimed to be able to synthesize a variety of medications. The group released instructions for manufacturing pyrimethamine (Daraprim) from acetonitrile, ethyl bromide, and dicyandiamide with it. Laufer claims that it can also be used to make naloxone, cabotegravir, mifepristone, and misoprostol.

The MicroLab's "1.0" version was released in October 2025, at which point the group said they had "achieved [their] major goals". It has had several patch releases since then. The product roadmap on the project's development wiki shows additional planned features, but contains no dates or timelines. As of August, 2026, the group's wiki lists five recipes, only one of which (Metformin) is listed as "confirmed".

=== Abortion ===
In 2022, Four Thieves released detailed instructions for re-compounding the abortion drug misoprostol so that it could be delivered on paper rather than in pills, and subsequently distributed business cards at a hacker convention in Queens, New York. The cards were labeled "This Card is an Abortion" and each one had three doses of misoprostol embedded in it.

=== Claims of Chemical Synthesis ===
The collective claims to have synthesized a number of drugs, including Pyrimethamine, the same drug that in 2016 increased in price in USA from $13 to $750 in 2019.

== Criticism ==
Jose Gomez-Marquez, who is researching pharmaceuticals at MIT, has stated his belief that the group is more about publicity than medication, and is concerned about the danger of unvetted information being published. Vinay Prasad, a professor of medicine at Oregon Health & Science University, believes that DIY medication is "foolhardy".

Jo Zayner, another biohacker, believes that the group's work is more symbolic than anything else.

Pharmaceutical chemist and blogger Derek Lowe has written multiple articles about the group. He has described the Vice magazine article on the collective as "largely bullshit". He noted that they had synthesized known substances rather than producing new ones. He also claimed that their proposal to combat hepatitis C could accidentally cause treatment-resistant strains of hepatitis C. In September 2024 Derek Lowe replied to further publicity for the group, accusing them of failing to address the fact that Sofosbuvir is given as part of a combination therapy or how they calculated the figure of $70 for a whole course of treatment. He also claims that the group doesn't address waste disposal, purification, solvents or availability of starting materials.

Jeremiah Johnson, a researcher at the Massachusetts Institute of Technology, has stated that using the MicroLab could be dangerous as it could create the wrong drug or the wrong dose. Eric von Hippel, an economist at MIT who supports DIY medication, has stated that the device could create chemical byproducts as well as or instead of the intended medication.

Yvette d'Entremont has criticized the potential lack of sterility in the EpiPencil assembly. D'Entremont also highlighted the margin of error when drawing up the epinephrine could easily be misjudged, putting people's lives at risk. Theresa Eisenman, a spokeswoman for the United States Food and Drug Administration, stated that using such a device is a "potentially dangerous practice".

== Legal status ==
Patricia Zettler, a former attorney at the FDA, believes that Four Thieves' work is legal because they are only providing information rather than drugs themselves.

== Members ==
Four Thieves' core membership is generally composed of technically trained people including scientists and engineers.

=== Michael Laufer ===
Michael Swan Laufer (sometimes styled as Mixæl Laufer) is the de facto leader of the 'Four Thieves Vinegar Collective'. Laufer is notable for creating the EpiPencil, an open source alternative to the Epipen.

Laufer has a Ph.D. in mathematics and physics from the CUNY Graduate Centre. Laufer was the director of mathematics at Silicon Valley's Menlo College, and a part time teacher of mathematics at San Quentin State Prison, California. Laufer is also a Senior Research Fellow at the UNESCO Crossings Institute. In 2008 Laufer went to El Salvador where he saw hospitals that had run out of birth control medicine, he founded the Four Thieves Vinegar Collective shortly afterwards. Laufer publicly shared videos in 2016 that illustrated how to manufacture generic version of the Epi-Pen epinephrine auto-injector from components readily available to the public.

Laufer's work is both about access to medicine and about the right to personal autonomy and information, seeking to undo a trend that has put healthcare decision-making in the control of financially motivated private actors. Laufer believes that providing lifesaving medication to those in need justifies violation of intellectual property rights. He wants to find simple ways to produce emergency contraceptives and common medications for HIV/AIDS and hepatitis C.

In 2019 Laufer co-created a mesh-network sub-dermal implant that costs less than US$50, allowing humans to internally carry wireless routers. Soon after, he had one implanted in himself.

== See also ==
- Direct action
- DIY transgender hormone therapy
- Open Source Medical Supplies
- Jo Zayner
