= Heather Manchin =

American business executive (born 1969)

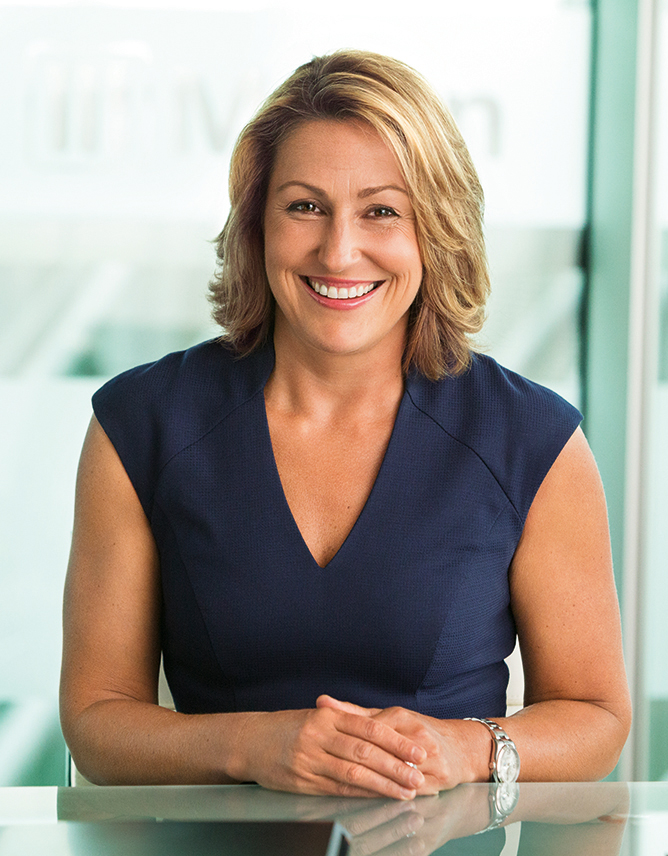
- Manchin in 2015
- Born: Heather Renée Manchin; June 27, 1969 (age 57); Morgantown, West Virginia, U.S.
- Other name: Heather Kirby
- Education: West Virginia University (BA)
- Occupation: Businesswoman
- Title: Former CEO of Mylan
- Spouses: Douglas Kirby (divorced) Jeffrey Bresch (divorced)
- Children: 4
- Parent(s): Gayle Conelly (mother); Joe Manchin (father)

Heather Manchin (formerly Bresch; born June 27, 1969) is an American business executive. In 2012, she was named as the chief executive officer (CEO) of Netherlands-based pharmaceutical company Mylan, becoming the first woman to run a Fortune 500 pharmaceutical company. Manchin retired in 2020, upon the closing of Mylan's combination with Upjohn. Manchin has been a central figure in two controversies: a 2007 accusation of inflating her resume with an unearned MBA degree, and as the CEO of Mylan during the 2016 controversy over pricing of the company's EpiPen products. In 2015, she was listed as #22 in Fortune magazine's "Most Powerful Women" list.

Manchin is the daughter of former West Virginia governor and U.S. senator Joe Manchin; the two co-founded the Independent Leadership Council in 2026.

== Early life ==
Born Heather Renée Manchin, in Morgantown, West Virginia, Manchin grew up in Fairmont and Farmington, West Virginia, in a Roman Catholic family of partial Italian and Czech descent. She is the daughter of Gayle Conelly Manchin and Joe Manchin, who was a prominent politician throughout her childhood and was the senior United States senator from West Virginia until January 3, 2025.

Manchin attended Fairmont Senior High School in Fairmont, West Virginia, and graduated from West Virginia University (WVU) in 1991 with a bachelor's degree in political science and international relations. She also landed her first job in 1991, working as a clerk for Mylan.

=== MBA controversy ===
In 2007, The Pittsburgh Post-Gazette reported that Manchin had claimed to have an MBA degree from West Virginia University, but the university disputed that. The university subsequently awarded her an EMBA despite her having completed only 26 of the required 48 credits. Her father was governor of the state of West Virginia at the time.

In the ensuing controversy, the university announced in April 2008 that it would rescind Manchin's degree. Michael Garrison, WVU president at the time, was reported to be "a family friend and former business associate" of Manchin and a former consultant and lobbyist for Mylan. After a faculty vote of no confidence, Garrison and several university officials subsequently resigned.

== Career ==
=== Early work ===
In 1992, Manchin started working as a clerk in a factory owned by Mylan, a generic drug company, and rose through the company to become the chief executive officer in 2012. At a WVU basketball game in 1992, Manchin's father, politician Joe Manchin, mentioned his daughter's job search to Mylan CEO Milan Puskar, and the company soon after offered her a position in the quality control department of a factory in Morgantown, before eventually promoting her to the executive level.

=== Government relations and advocacy ===
From 2002 to 2005, Manchin was Mylan's director of government relations. She contributed to the development of the Medicare Prescription Drug, Improvement, and Modernization Act of 2003, which created Medicare Part D, a prescription-drug benefit.

In 2006, Manchin testified before the U.S. Senate Special Committee on Aging to lobby for changes to the law that would prevent pharmaceutical companies from raising challenges to the introduction of generic competitors by filing citizen's petitions with the FDA, and that would prevent pharma companies from undercutting the profits of generic drug companies by making deals for authorized generics to be introduced.

When Mylan expanded internationally, Manchin noticed that Mylan's U.S.-based pharmaceutical manufacturing plant had full-time staff from the Food and Drug Administration (FDA) devoted to it, whereas facilities abroad had not been inspected by the FDA for more than a decade.

Manchin persuaded fellow American generic drug manufacturers to support the Generic Drug User Fee Act of 2012, which now forces generic drug manufacturers to fund increased FDA inspections of offshore manufacturing plants. While the law has achieved its goal of equalizing the regulatory burden of American generic drug manufacturers, this change increased the price of some generic drugs since foreign manufacturers were forced to invest in greater quality control measures.

=== Mylan executive ===
Manchin has had several executive roles at Mylan, senior vice president of corporate strategic development, head of North American Operations, chief operating officer, and chief integration officer.

Manchin led the integration of Matrix Laboratories Limited and Merck KGaA's generics and specialty pharmaceutical businesses with Mylan's operations. She was chair of the Generic Pharmaceutical Association (GPhA) for two terms. Manchin was appointed president of Mylan in 2009 and joined Mylan's board of directors in March 2011.

Manchin's appointment as chief executive officer (CEO) was announced in 2011, and she officially took the position in January 2012. Manchin was the first female CEO of a large pharmaceutical business. At the time, she was one of 18 female CEOs of a Fortune 500 company. After seeing how few female candidates were available for positions that require a background in science and math, she became more interested in promoting math and science education among young girls.

Manchin was recognized in Esquire's 2011 "Patriots of the Year" list for her work pushing for the Food and Drug Administration Safety and Innovation Act (FDASIA). She was named one of Fortune magazine's "50 Most Powerful Women In Business" in 2014.

Also in 2014, Manchin and Mylan announced a $5.3 billion acquisition of Abbott Laboratories as part of a corporate tax inversion plan to re-organize the company in the Netherlands and move its domicile to a country with lower taxes. Manchin said the decision was necessary to "maintain competitiveness against pharmaceutical manufacturers that had already executed similar inversion strategies." The company completed the complex tax inversion in February 2015. The inversion—which formally resulted in the creation of a new company, Mylan N.V., with 78% of its shares held by former Mylan Inc. shareholders and 22% of its shared held by Abbott Labs shareholders—was expected to immediately drop Mylan's U.S. corporate tax rate to 21% (from 24%) in the first year "and into the high teens over the next three to five years." The New York Times said that it was somewhat "disconcerting" for a company that benefits from large government contracts to renounce their citizenship for tax benefits. Proxy filings show that from 2007 to 2015, Manchin's compensation rose from $2,453,456 to $18,931,068, a 671% increase in pay.

==== EpiPen pricing and retirement ====
In 2016, Mylan's pricing of the EpiPen, used to treat anaphylaxis (severe allergic reactions), was severely criticized. Mylan had secured the rights to the nearly 50-year-old EpiPen as part of the Merck KGaA deal in 2007. At that time annual sales were around $200 million. Manchin launched an advertising campaign to increase awareness of "EpiPen" as a treatment for anaphylaxis; the company also successfully lobbied the FDA to broaden the label to include risk of anaphylaxis and in parallel, successfully lobbied Congress to generate legislation making EpiPens available in schools and other public places. The company hired the same lobbyists that Medtronic had used for its defibrillator legislation. From 2007 to 2016, Mylan increased the price of EpiPens by 461 percent, from about $100 for a package of two pens to about $600. By the first half of 2015, Mylan had an 85% market share of such devices in the U.S., and in that year sales reached around $1.5 billion and accounted for 40% of Mylan's profit. The price increase was met with widespread criticism of Manchin and Mylan. Manchin explained at the 2016 Forbes Healthcare Summit that Mylan's price increases were justified by the many improvements she claimed the company had made to the product. Amid this backlash, Manchin led Mylan to introduce a generic version of the device which sells for half the price of the brand-name device. The generic version in 2016 remained more expensive than the original brand version of EpiPen prior to Mylan's purchase of the rights, even when accounting for inflation.

In July 2019, Manchin announced that she would retire in 2020 after Mylan merged with Upjohn. The merger was completed in November 2020 and Manchin stepped down. The new company was named Viatris. According to the Pittsburgh Business Journal, when she left Mylan, she was the second most highly paid executive in the area of Pittsburgh, and received a "golden parachute" estimated at $30.8 million.

In 2021, a case was ongoing to determine whether Mylan had attempted to monopolize the EpiPen market, with both Mylan N.V. and Manchin being sued on racketeering claims and anti-trust claims. The lawsuit, which consolidated several consumer cases, was moved to federal court in Kansas City in 2017. In February 2020, the lawsuit moved ahead as a nationwide class action. On June 24, 2021, a federal judge tossed the racketeering claims and some of the antitrust claims, also dropping RICO claims against Manchin. The case went on trial on September 7, 2021. On September 7, 2021, Ryan Grim of The Intercept reported that during an ongoing racketeering case involving Mylan and Manchin, "newly released court documents show [Manchin] discussing a deal with Pfizer to eliminate a chief competitor to EpiPen, clearing the way for major price hikes." The 2010 and 2011 email discussions, unsealed by the judge, showed Manchin's assistant discussing divesting from Adrenaclick after the closure of the Pfizer/King deal. They "also show [Manchin] approving a scheme to force customers, captured by the company’s monopoly, to purchase two EpiPens at once, regardless of medical need."

== Honors and awards ==
Manchin was ranked #31 in Fortune magazine's 2014 "50 Most Powerful Women" list. That same year, she won the EY Global Impact of the Year Award. Manchin was the 2017 Albert Schweitzer Leadership Award honoree at an awards gala hosted by the Hugh O'Brian Youth Leadership Foundation.

Manchin was chair of the Generic Pharmaceutical Association’s board of directors in 2016, 2005, and 2004, and as vice chair in 2003 and 2006.

== Personal life ==
Manchin was married to Jones Day lawyer Jeffrey J. Bresch until 2020. Before that, she was married to West Virginia businessman Douglas Kirby.
