= Carne al piatto =

Italian recipe for cooking meat

Carne al piatto (lit. 'plated meat') is a northern/central Italian recipe for meat cooking.

== Preparation ==
Thin slices of beef are placed on a plate, along with a generous amount of olive oil, and seasoned with salt and lemon juice (optional seasonings are rosemary, sage, bay leaves). The plate is then placed atop a pot containing some water, covered by another plate, thus creating a mini-oven. Cooking takes a few minutes, depending on the thickness of the meat slices. The indirect heat of the boiling water cooks the meat without frying, therefore the dish is naturally tasty, very light, and easily digestible. Usual sides are boiled vegetables (potatoes, asparagus, spinach, etc.) or garden salads tossed with lemon, olive oil, and salt.
