= West Virginia University M.B.A. controversy =

2007–08 American academic controversy

The West Virginia University M.B.A. controversy concerns the granting of an Executive Master of Business Administration degree (EMBA) by West Virginia University to Mylan pharmaceutical company executive Heather Bresch in 2007. An independent panel later concluded that the university changed its records, and granted the degree despite incomplete graduation requirements. West Virginia University's president Michael Garrison, its provost Gerald Lang, and its business school dean R. Stephen Sears, resigned as a result of the investigation, and the university's general counsel and the president's communications officer relinquished those roles.

== Initial questions ==
On October 2, 2007 Heather Bresch, the daughter of then-governor (and subsequently United States Senator) Joe Manchin of West Virginia, was promoted to chief operating officer at Mylan, a Cecil Township, Pennsylvania-based generic drug maker.

On October 11, 2007 the Pittsburgh Post-Gazette contacted West Virginia University to confirm academic credentials claimed by Bresch, including an EMBA degree. Research done by the Post-Gazette indicated that Bresch's course work ceased with 22 out of the 48-credit-hour program remaining to be completed. The WVU Registrar told the newspaper that Bresch had earned an undergraduate degree, but did not finish her graduate degree. However, on October 15, 2007, a university spokeswoman announced that WVU officials had verified that Bresch had "completed all the requirements for an executive masters of business administration degree," but did not receive her diploma because she failed to pay a $50 graduation fee. The WVU official attributed the misunderstanding to the business school's failure to transfer records from nearly half of Bresch's course work.

On October 22, 2007, R. Stephen Sears, the Milan Puskar Dean of WVU's business school, sent a letter to WVU's admissions and records office retroactively granting Bresch an EMBA. Six classes were added to her record with letter grades, and two classes with "Incomplete" grades were given letter grades.

== Panel ==
In 2008, the University commissioned a report written by a panel of faculty members from WVU and other universities to look into the matter. As covered by the Post-Gazette, the panel discovered the change in Bresch's letter grades, and the University announced in April 2008 that it would rescind Bresch's degree. WVU provost Gerald Lang announced his resignation and shortly thereafter College of Business & Economics Dean Stephen Sears announced his resignation as well.

The report's panel found that high-ranking university administrators "cherry-picked" information and that grades were "simply pulled from thin air" to grant Bresch the degree nearly 10 years after she was supposed to graduate. The panel concluded administrators lacked documentation to prove Bresch's claims, relied too heavily on verbal assertions and caved to political pressure. The report did not find that the university president directly interfered, but it concluded the presence of his chief of staff in the decision-making meeting created "palpable" pressure. The panel concluded (“taking the most charitable view") that Bresch did not deliberately lie in believing that she had earned the degree.

== Aftermath and repercussions ==
On May 1, 2008, the Pittsburgh Post-Gazette, which first reported on the controversy, published an editorial calling for WVU's President Michael Garrison's resignation. On the same day, WVU's student newspaper, The Daily Athenaeum held a student forum where some students called for Garrison's resignation. Garrison did not attend; he was represented by a member of the executive communications staff.

=== Resignations and calls for resignations ===
The Chairman of West Virginia University's Health Sciences Center neurosurgery department organized a faculty letter in support of President Garrison. Some faculty members felt pressured to sign the letter, which had 23 signatures.

On May 5, 2008, WVU's faculty senate passed a non-binding resolution 77-19 that stated: "The Faculty Senate of West Virginia University votes no confidence in President Garrison. For the good of the institution and for the benefit of our students, he must resign or the Board of Governors must require his resignation." One emeritus member of the faculty called the grade alterations by the WVU administration a "serious academic crime" by subverting the faculty's traditional authority.

Many WVU alumni expressed concern and anger regarding the controversy and feared damage to the university's reputation. Peter J. Kalis — a WVU alum, Rhodes scholar, and both prominent attorney at and chairman of Pittsburgh law firm Kirkpatrick & Lockhart/Gates — called for removal of Steven Goodwin, chairman of WVU's board of directors, as well as Garrison. Garrison subsequently resigned and was replaced by interim President C. Peter Magrath. Magrath served for a year before James P. Clements was named to be the next president.

In addition, the university's general counsel stepped down as general counsel but remained vice president of legal affairs. The president's communications officer was reassigned to another job in the university.
