= Independent Leadership Council =

American political organization

- Abbreviation: ILC
- Formation: July 24, 2026
- Founders: Joe Manchin; Heather Manchin; Adam Brandon; Seth Cohen
- Website: Official website

The Independent Leadership Council (ILC) is a nonpartisan nonprofit organization that recruits and supports independent congressional candidates. The ILC was founded in 2026 by former U.S. senator Joe Manchin, his daughter Heather Manchin, former FreedomWorks president Adam Brandon, and former Forbes chief impact officer Seth Cohen.

== History ==
The Independent Leadership Council (ILC) was founded on July 24, 2026, by former U.S. senator Joe Manchin, who left the Democratic Party in 2024; his daughter, businesswoman Heather Manchin; former FreedomWorks president Adam Brandon; and former Forbes chief impact officer Seth Cohen. The group was described by The New York Times as a "nonpartisan nonprofit ... that aims to cultivate and financially back declared independent candidates for Congress."

The ILC's inaugural summit in West Virginia was attended by U.S. representative Kevin Kiley, who left the Republican Party earlier that year, and Montana Senate candidate Seth Bodnar. Candidates attending the summit signed a "Declaration of Independents" (an allusion to the Declaration of Independence), pledging not to caucus with either major party if elected. The ILC's candidate commitments also include pledges to oppose gerrymandering and support term limits.

On August 28, 2026, the ILC announced they had raised over $10 million since their launch the previous month. On September 16, the ILC endorsed Bodnar and Kiley in their respective races. The ILC's hybrid PAC, Independent PAC, spent $1.8 million supporting Bodnar's Senate campaign in August 2026.
