= Michael Garrison (politician) =

American academic administrator

22nd President of the West Virginia University
- In office 2007–2008
- Preceded by: David C. Hardesty, Jr.
- Succeeded by: C. Peter Magrath (Interim)

Personal details
- Education: West Virginia University; West Virginia University College of Law

Michael Garrison is an American lawyer and university president, who served as the 22nd president of West Virginia University before he resigned amid the West Virginia University M.B.A. controversy.

== Early life ==
Garrison is a graduate of the West Virginia University class of 1992 and earned a J.D. at West Virginia University College of Law in 1996. He attended St Anne's College at Oxford University on a Rotary Scholarship from 1992 to 1993.

== Law career ==
Garrison had been a managing member of Spilman Thomas & Battle PLLC in Morgantown, West Virginia. He served as Cabinet Secretary in the West Virginia Department of Tax and Revenue until 2001. From 2001 to 2003 he was the chief of staff to West Virginia Governor Bob Wise. Following that appointment, Garrison was awarded a Toll Fellowship from the Council of State Governments. In 2009, Garrison returned to his former law firm, Spilman Thomas & Battle, Garrison represented natural gas company Northeast Energy in its $42 million suit against the City of Morgantown, West Virginia. Northeast sought an injunction against the city, to prevent enforcement of its ban on horizontal hydraulic fracking. Morgantown passed its ban after Northeast sited a drill pad near the city's primary drinking-water intake. The ban and the issue received increased press coverage locally and nationally before the ban was struck down.

== Time at West Virginia University ==
He lectured as an adjunct professor in West Virginia University's department of political science in the years preceding his appointment as president. In 2007, Garrison was selected as West Virginia University's twenty-second president.

Garrison's selection as president was controversial with some on the university's faculty; the faculty senate passed a vote of no confidence on him in April 2007. The Pittsburgh Post-Gazette noted concerns about his lack of academic experience and the possibility that his inclusion among the finalists was the result of his political connections.

=== M.B.A. controversy and resignation ===
In 2008 Garrison became involved in a controversy involving the granting of a Master of Business Administration degree to Heather Bresch, who had failed to complete the required credits. Bresch is the daughter of then West Virginia Governor and former U.S. Senator Joe Manchin.

A panel led by WVU faculty members produced a report on the incident described by the Pittsburgh Post-Gazette as criticising the university administration for having made "a 'seriously flawed' decision fraught with favoritism." In May 2008 the faculty senate voted 77–19 to call for Garrison's resignation - a demand repeated by a vote (565-39, with 11 abstentions) open to all WVU faculty at a mass meeting a week later. In August 2012, West Virginia University officially closed its investigation, reaching no conclusion but foreseeing "unreasonable delays in investigating complaints of misconduct" raised questions about violations of due process rights.

On June 6, 2008, Garrison officially announced he would resign as President of the University effective September 1, 2008. He was succeeded by C. Peter Magrath on August 1, 2008.

In October 2008 a West Virginia grand jury decided not to indict Garrison on criminal charges relating to the degree scandal.
