= ATNAA =

Medical device

Combination of
- Atropine: Anticholinergic agent
- Pralidoxime chloride: Antidote

Clinical data
- Trade names: Atnaa, Duodote
- AHFS/Drugs.com: Professional Drug Facts
- License data: US DailyMed: Atropine and pralidoxime
- Routes of administration: Intramuscular
- ATC code: V03AB54 (WHO)

Legal status
- Legal status: US: ℞-only

Identifiers
- PubChem SID: 497621172
- KEGG: D12759

An ATNAA (Antidote Treatment Nerve Agent Autoinjector) is any of a variety of autoinjectors in use with the US Armed Forces. An autoinjector is a medical device designed to deliver a single dose of a particular (typically life-saving) drug.

Most autoinjectors are spring-loaded syringes. By design, autoinjectors are easy to use and are intended for self-administration by patients. The site of injection depends on the drug loaded, but it typically is administered into the thigh or the buttocks. The injectors were initially designed to overcome the hesitation associated with self-administration of the needle-based drug delivery device. It is the newer delivery vehicle to be used in lieu of the Mark I NAAK.

== Purpose ==
The ATNAA provides atropine and pralidoxime chloride in a single delivery system, although the two drugs are separate within the device. The use of the device is only to be administered in the extreme case of organophosphate poisoning. The delivery system is designed for use by military personnel only, and is only issued to DOD personnel that are considered to be in immediate danger of a chemical attack or work in a position (such as ordnance disposal) where there is a high likelihood of nerve agent exposure.

== FDA approval ==
During initial trials and submission to the FDA for approval, the United States Department of Defense requested that the Food and Drug Administration (FDA) waive the requirement for the phrase 'Rx only' being included on the labeling for the ATNAA device; the rationale being that it would be confusing to troops. The waiver request was denied. The DoD opted to include the phrase at the end of the package insert instead, and this modification was found acceptable.

== Training ==
As a condition of approval, the FDA lists on the device label the precise instructions that are to be given to military personnel on dosage and administration. While each branch of the DoD typically provides their own tailored training, an example of the MK I NAAK and ATNAA are referenced in the United States Air Force Self Aid Buddy Care Training (SABC). SABC encompasses basic life support and limb-saving techniques to help wounded or injured personnel survive in medical emergencies until medical help is available.
