= Salvia officinalis =

Conservation status
- Least Concern (IUCN 3.1)

Scientific classification
- Kingdom: Plantae
- Clade: Tracheophytes
- Clade: Angiosperms
- Clade: Eudicots
- Clade: Asterids
- Order: Lamiales
- Family: Lamiaceae
- Genus: Salvia
- Species: S. officinalis

Binomial name
- Salvia officinalis L.

Species of plant

Salvia officinalis, common sage or sage, is a perennial, evergreen subshrub, with woody stems, grayish leaves, and blue to purplish flowers. It is a member of the mint family (Lamiaceae) and native to the Mediterranean region, though it has been naturalized in many places throughout the world. It has a long history of culinary use, and in modern times it has been used as an ornamental garden plant. The common name "sage" is also used for closely related species and cultivars.

== Description ==
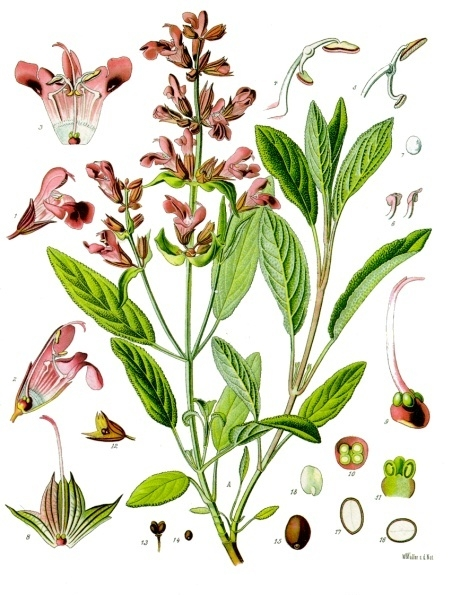
Painting from Koehler's Medicinal Plants (1887)

Cultivars are quite variable in size, leaf and flower color, and foliage pattern, with many variegated leaf types. The Old World type grows to approximately 60 cm (2 ft) tall and wide, with lavender flowers most common, though they can also be white, pink, or purple. The plant flowers in late spring or summer. The leaves are oblong, ranging in size up to 65 mm (2 1/2 in) long by 25 mm (1 in) wide. Leaves are grey-green, rugose on the upper side, and nearly white underneath due to the many short soft hairs. Modern cultivars include leaves with purple, rose, cream, and yellow in many variegated combinations. The common sage gives its name to the grayish-green color sage, due to the distinctive color of its leaves.

== Taxonomy ==
Salvia officinalis was described by Carl Linnaeus in 1753. It has been grown for centuries in the Old World for its food and healing properties, and was often described in old herbals for the many miraculous properties attributed to it. The binary name, officinalis, refers to uses practiced in traditional medicine —the officina was the traditional storeroom of a monastery where herbs for treatments were stored. S. officinalis has been classified under many other scientific names over the years, including six different names since 1940 alone. It is the type species for the genus Salvia.

=== Etymology ===
The specific epithet officinalis refers to plants with a well-established culinary value or assumed use in folk medicine.

Salvia officinalis has numerous common names. Some of the best-known are sage, common sage, garden sage, golden sage, kitchen sage, true sage, culinary sage, Dalmatian sage, and broadleaf sage. Cultivated forms include purple sage and red sage.

== Distribution and habitat ==
Native to the Mediterranean region, it has been naturalized in many places throughout the world.

== Cultivation ==
In favourable conditions in the garden, S. officinalis can grow to a substantial size (1 square metre or more), but a number of cultivars are more compact. As such they are valued as small ornamental flowering shrubs, rather than for their herbal properties. Some provide low ground cover, especially in sunny dry environments. Like many herbs they can be killed by a cold wet winter, especially if the soil is not well drained. But they are easily propagated from summer cuttings, and some cultivars are produced from seeds.

Named cultivars include:

- 'Alba', a white-flowered cultivar
- 'Aurea', golden sage
- 'Berggarten', a cultivar with large leaves, which rarely blooms, extending the useful life of the leaves
- 'Extrakta', has leaves with higher oil concentrations
- 'Icterina', a cultivar with yellow-green variegated leaves
- 'Lavandulaefolia', a small leaved cultivar
- 'Purpurascens' ('Purpurea'), a purple-leafed cultivar
- 'Tricolor', a cultivar with white, purple and green variegated leaves

'Icterina' and 'Purpurascens' have gained the Royal Horticultural Society's Award of Garden Merit.

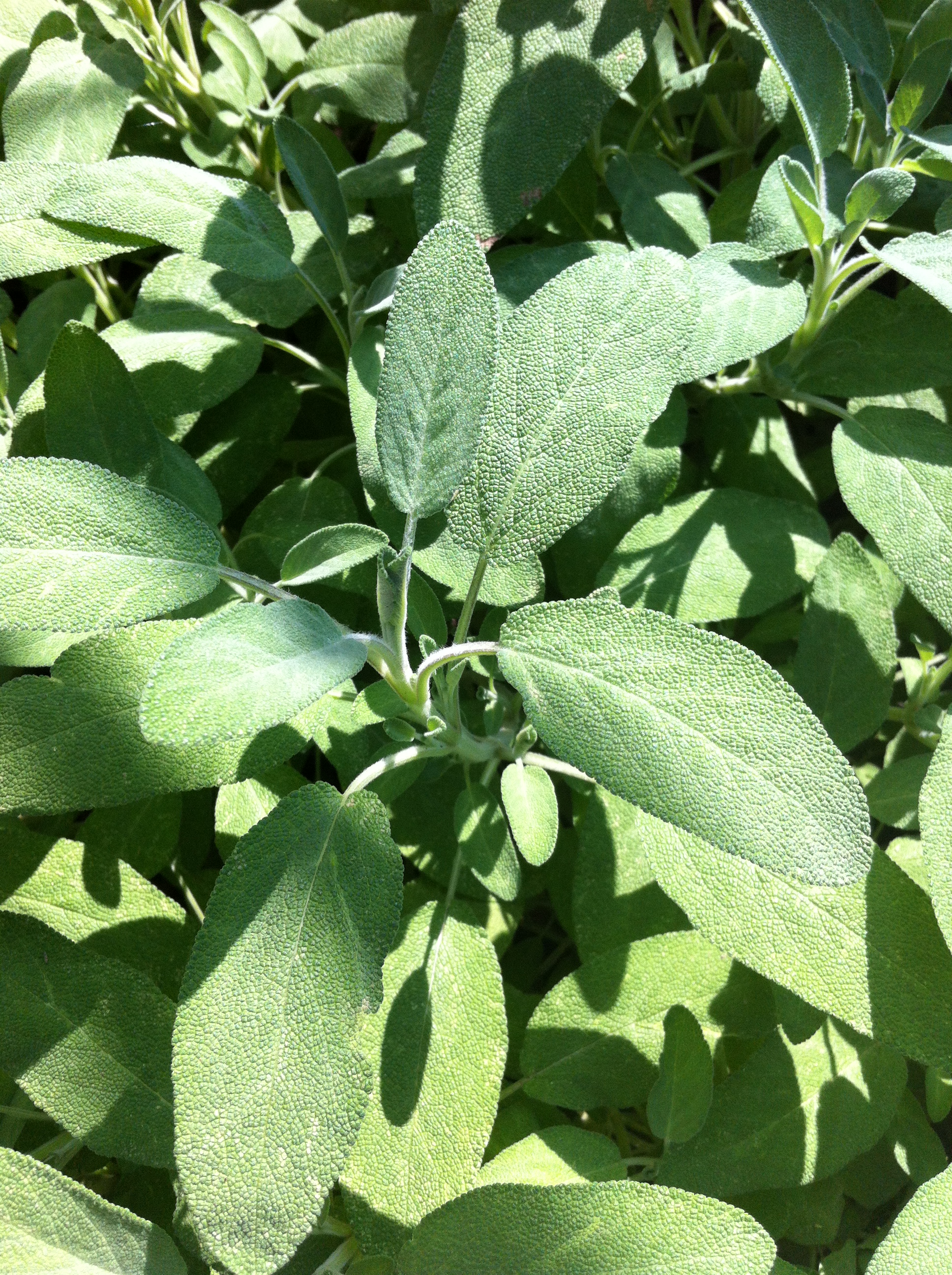
'Berggarten'

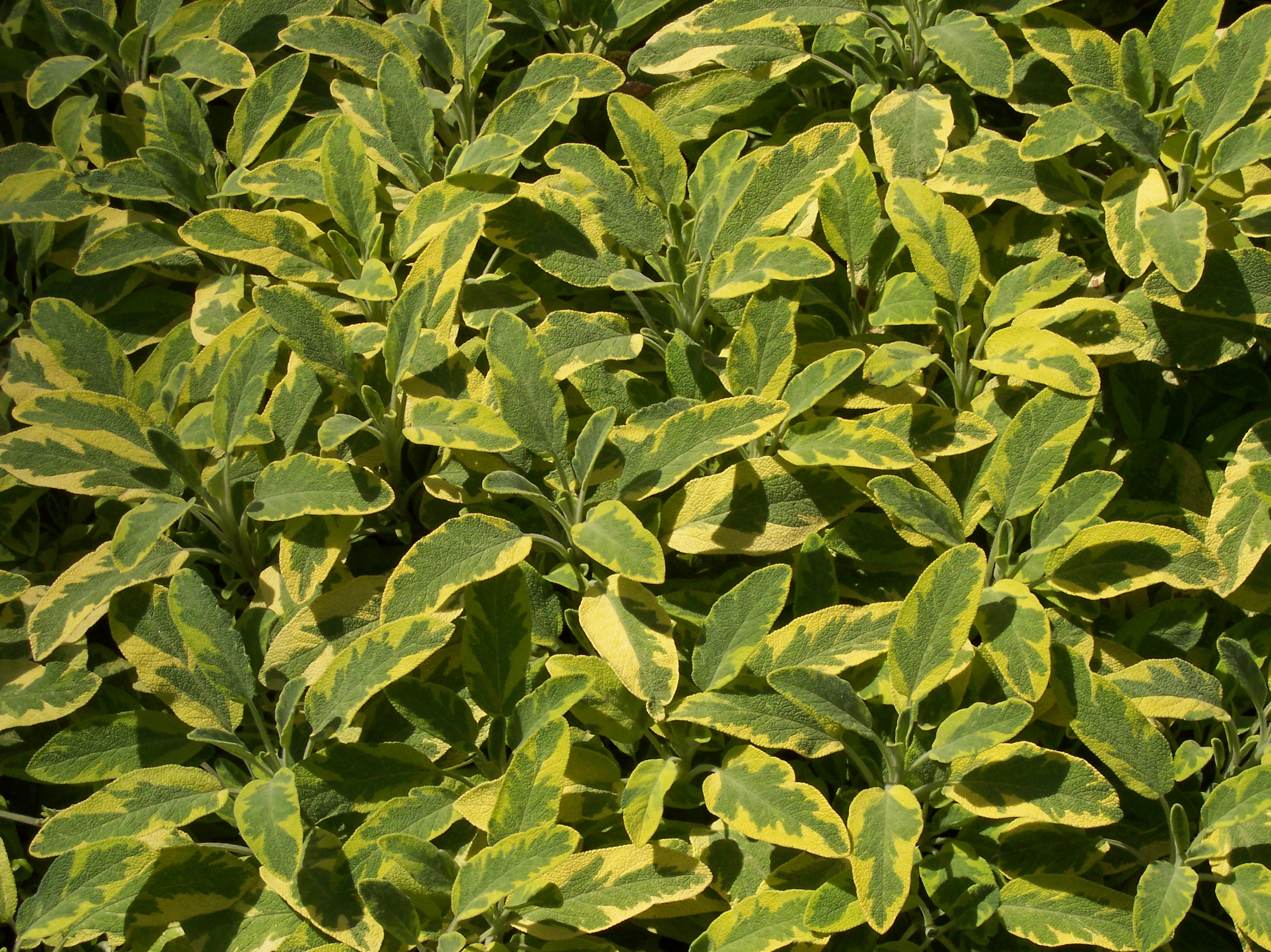
'Icterina'

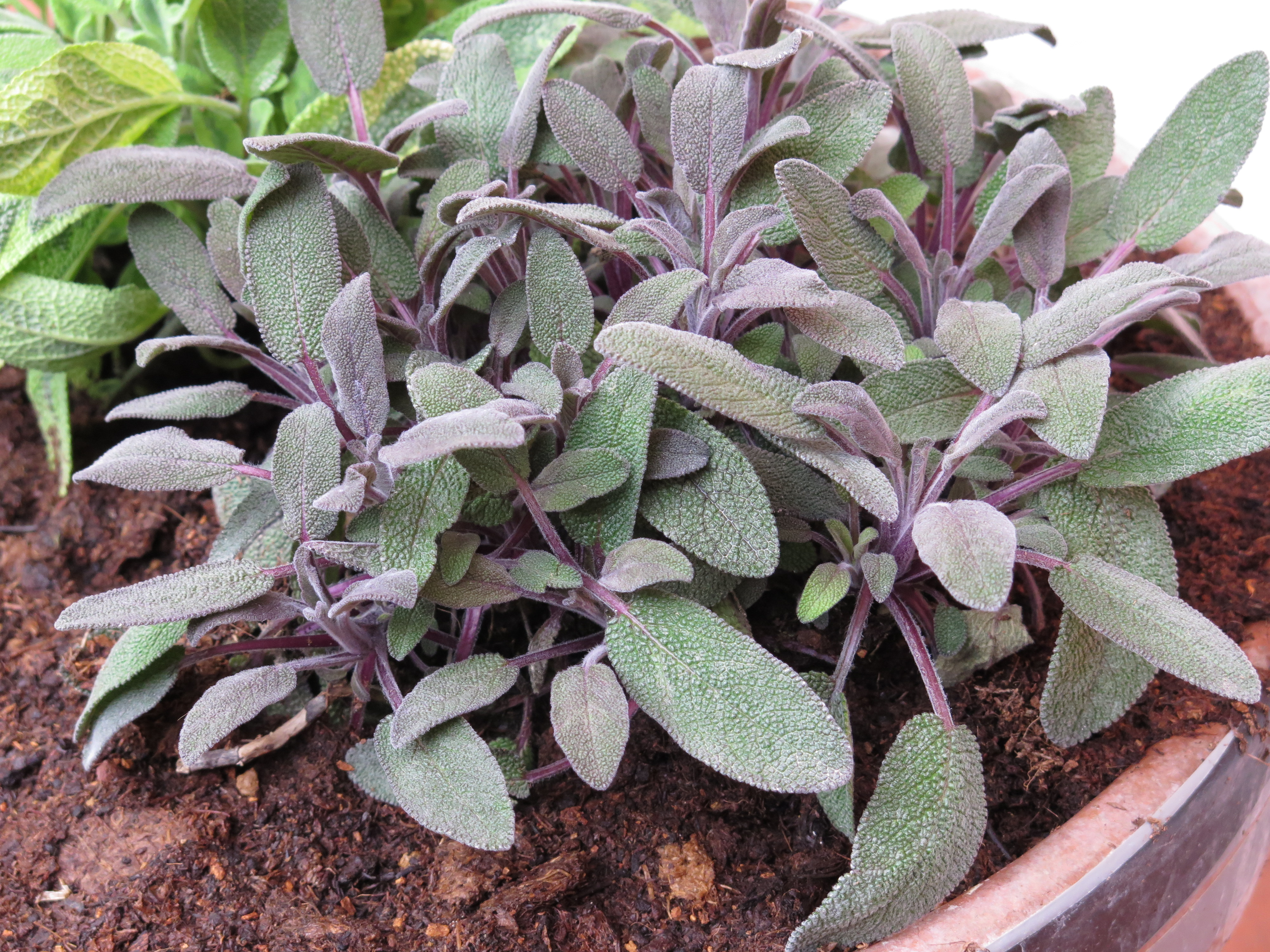
'Purpurascens'

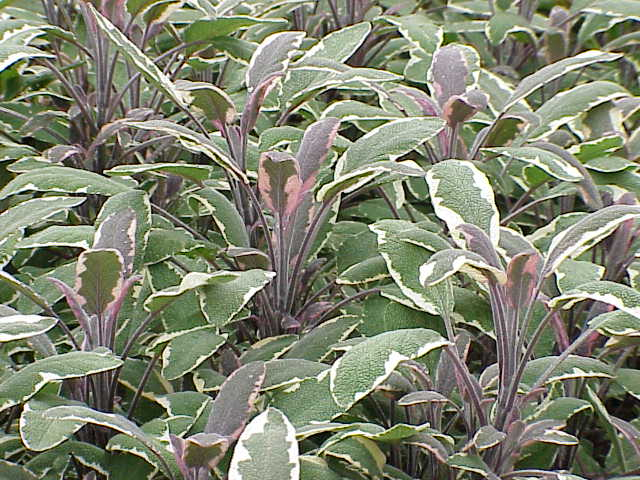
'Tricolor'

== Uses ==
=== Historical uses ===
Salvia officinalis has been used since ancient times for treating snakebites, increasing women's fertility, and more. The Romans referred to sage as the "holy herb," and employed it in their religious rituals. Theophrastus wrote about two different sages, a wild undershrub he called sphakos, and a similar cultivated plant he called elelisphakos. Pliny the Elder said the latter plant was called salvia by the Romans, and used as a diuretic, a local anesthetic for the skin, a styptic, and for other uses. Dioscorides, Pliny, and Galen all recommended sage as a diuretic, hemostatic, emmenagogue, and tonic.

The plant had a high reputation throughout the Middle Ages, with many sayings referring to its healing properties and value. It was sometimes called S. salvatrix (sage the savior). Emperor Charlemagne recommended the plant for cultivation in the early Middle Ages, and during the Carolingian Empire, it was cultivated in monastery gardens. The 9th-century monk Walafrid Strabo described it in his poem Hortulus as having a sweet scent and being useful for many human ailments—he went back to the Greek root for the name and called it lelifagus.

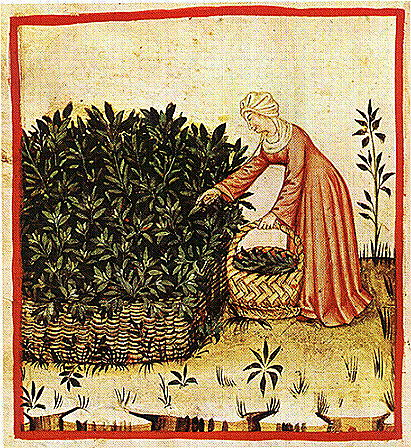
Sage being gathered in a scene from the Tacuinum Sanitatis

Sage appears in recipes for Four Thieves Vinegar, a blend of herbs which was supposed to ward off the plague during the Black death epidemic of the 14th-century. The 1393 woman's guidebook Le Menagier de Paris, in addition to recommending cold sage soup and sage sauce for poultry, recommends infusion of sage for washing hands at table, while Gervase Markham's The English Huswife (1615) gives a recipe for a tooth-powder of sage and salt. John Gerard's Herball (1597) states that sage "is singularly good for the head and brain, it quickeneth the senses and memory, strengtheneth the sinews, restoreth health to those that have the palsy, and taketh away shakey trembling of the members."

In past centuries, sage was also used for hair care, insect bites and wasp stings, nervous conditions, mental conditions, oral preparations for inflammation of the mouth, tongue and throat, and also to reduce fevers.

=== Culinary ===
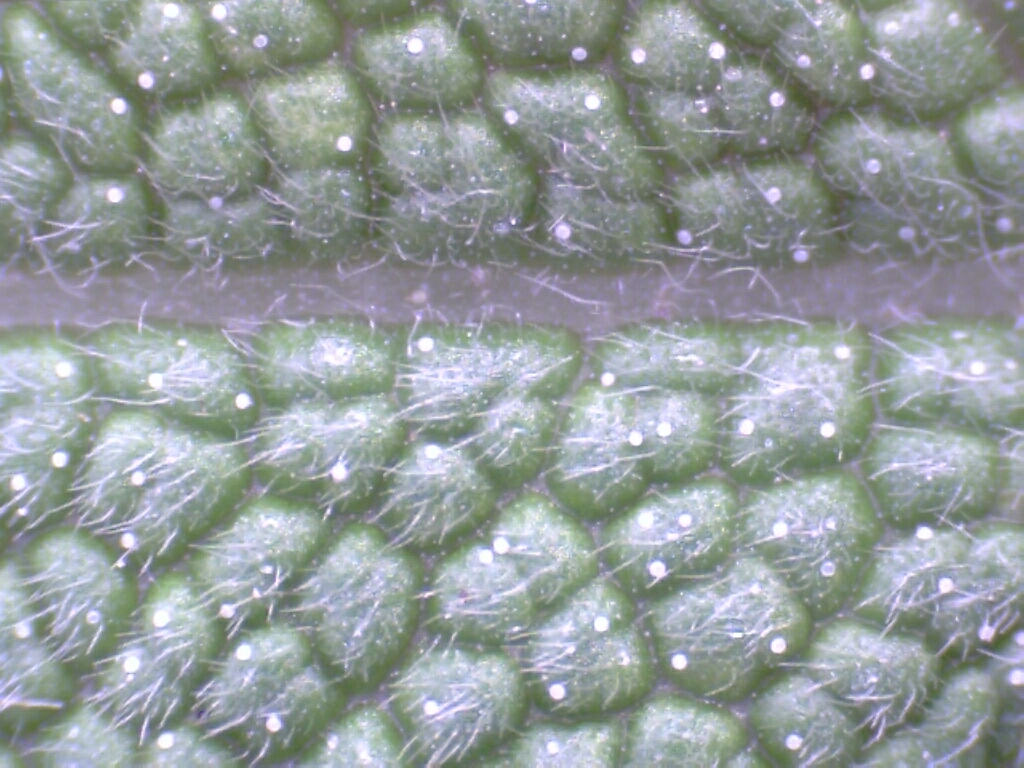
The top side of a sage leaf – trichomes are visible.

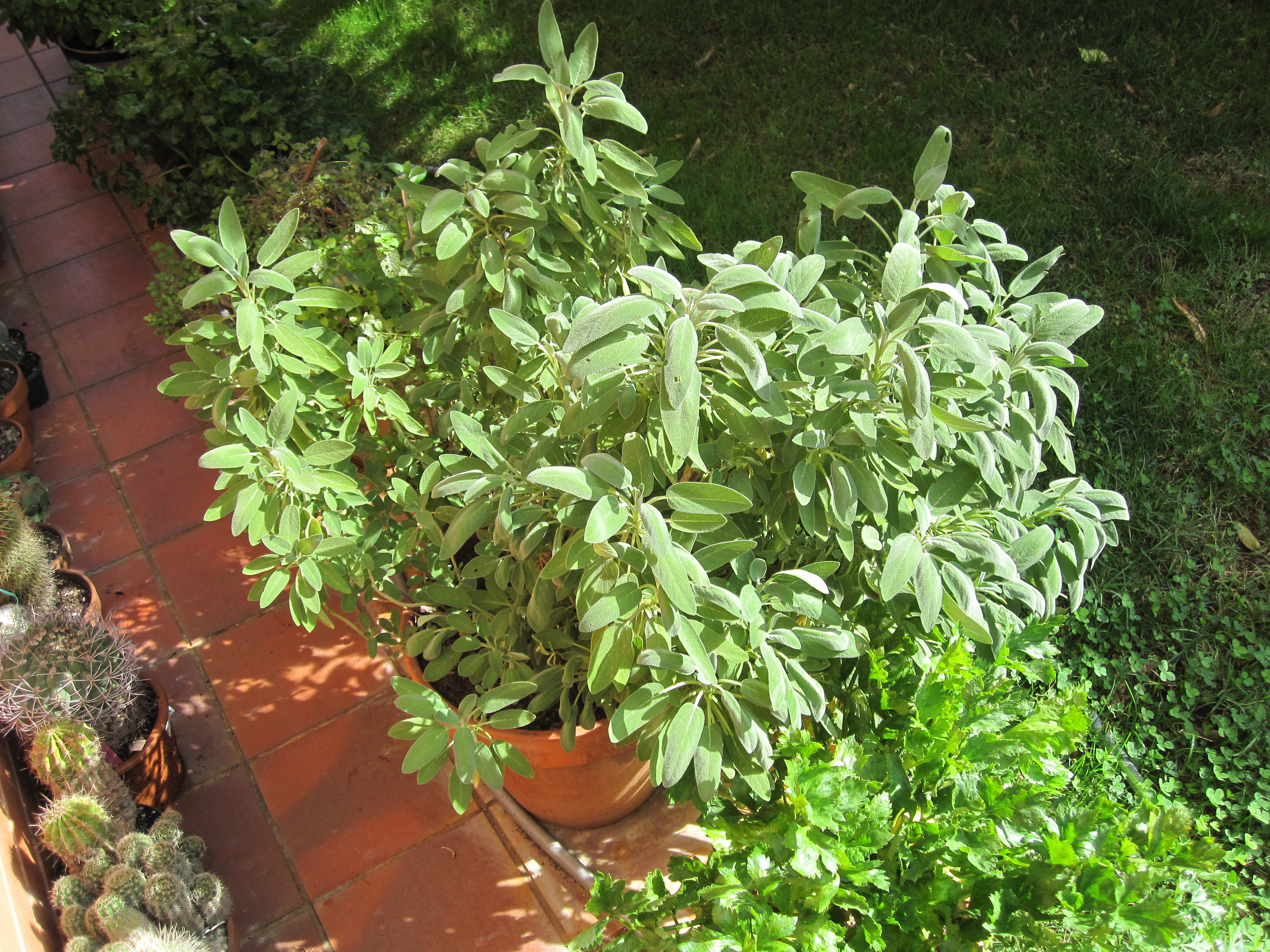
A specimen of Salvia officinalis grown in a flowerpot

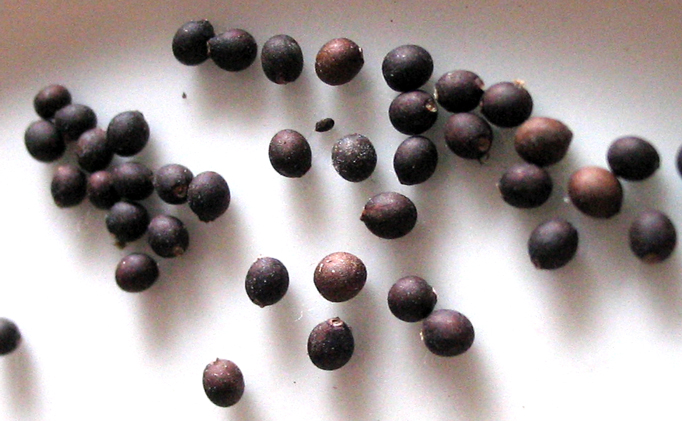
Sage seeds are small and almost spherical in shape.

In Britain, sage has for generations been listed as one of the essential herbs, along with parsley, rosemary, and thyme (as in the folk song "Scarborough Fair"). It has a savory, slightly peppery flavor. Sage appears in the 14th and 15th centuries in a "Cold Sage Sauce", known in French, English and Lombard cuisine, probably traceable to its appearance in Le Viandier de Taillevent. It appears in many European cuisines, notably Italian, Balkan and Middle Eastern cookery. In Italian cuisine, it is an essential ingredient for saltimbocca and other dishes, favored with fish. It is also fried to make salvia fritta.

In British and American cooking, it is traditionally served as sage and onion stuffing, an accompaniment to roast turkey or chicken at Christmas or Thanksgiving Day, and for Sunday roast dinners. Other dishes include pork casserole, Sage Derby cheese and Lincolnshire sausages. It is commonly paired with fall produce such as pumpkin or butternut squash, and it can be fried or frizzled to create a garnish for dishes. Despite the common use of traditional and available herbs in French cuisine, sage never found favor there.

=== Essential oil ===
Common sage is grown in parts of Europe for distillation of an essential oil, although other species such as Salvia fruticosa may also be harvested and distilled with it.

=== Research ===
As of 2017, S. officinalis was under preliminary research for its possible effects on cognitive performance in both healthy individuals and those with cognitive decline, although its long-term effects remain undetermined.

Salvia essential oils contain α and β-thujone, a neurotoxin that can cause convulsions in animals and severe intoxication in humans, leading the European Committee on Herbal Medicinal Products and European Medicines Agency to recommend a daily limit of 6 mg for supplemental use.

== See also ==
- List of Salvia species
