= Mark I NAAK =

Dual-chamber autoinjector

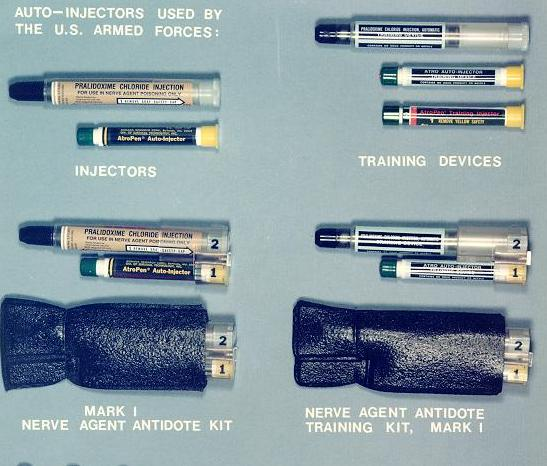
The Mark I NAAK (left) and its training kit (right)

In the United States military, the Mark I NAAK, or MARK I Kit, ("Nerve Agent Antidote Kit") is a dual-chamber autoinjector: Two anti-nerve agent drugs—atropine sulfate and pralidoxime chloride—each in injectable form, constitute the kit. The kits are only effective against the nerve agents tabun (GA), sarin (GB), soman (GD), and VX.

Typically, U.S. service members are issued three MARK I Kits when operating in circumstances where chemical weapons are considered a potential hazard. Along with the three kits are issued one CANA (Convulsive Antidote, Nerve Agent) for simultaneous use. (CANA is the drug diazepam or Valium, an anticonvulsant.) Both of these kits are intended for use in "buddy aid" or "self aid" administration of the drugs prior to decontamination and delivery of the patient to definitive medical care for the condition.

A newer model, the ATNAA (Antidote Treatment Nerve Agent Auto-Injector), has both the atropine and the pralidoxime in one syringe, allowing for simplified administration.

The use of a Mark 1 or ATNAA kit inhibits the nerve agents' purpose, thereby reducing the number of fatal casualties in the advent of chemical warfare. The kits should only be administered if nerve agents have been absorbed or inhaled.
