= Chematica =

Chemical synthesis software

- Developers: Elizabeth Wylie, Matthew Wampler-Doty, Ling Su, Andrea Cadeddu, Aaron Oppenheimer, Patrick Fuller, Malous Kossarian, Chris Gothard, Nosheen Gothard, Kamel Meguellati, Mikolaj Kowalik, Kyle Bishop, Bartosz Grzybowski
- Initial release: N/A
- Written in: Python, Java, C++, CoffeeScript
- Platform: Cross-platform
- Available in: English
- Type: Computer algebra, numerical computations, Information visualization, statistics, user interface creation
- License: Proprietary

Chematica is a software that uses algorithms and a collective database to predict synthesis pathways for molecules. The software development, led by Bartosz A. Grzybowski, was publicized in August 2012. In 2017, the software and database were wholly purchased by Merck KGaA, Darmstadt, Germany. Since the acquisition, the software has been made commercially available as Synthia.

== Features ==
The software was designed to combine long synthesis paths into shorter and more economical paths. The software complements other attempts such as manual searching or semi-automated search tools.

A molecule can be specified in multiple ways, including searching by Beilstein Registry Number, CAS registry number, chemical name, SMILES structure, or by drawing the molecule diagram itself. It supports optimization of reactions by cost. The program also supports 3D modeling of individual molecules, as well as labeling of functional groups.

The program also notes regulated and unregulated compounds, and uses specialized algorithms that avoid these. It also gives the classification and reasons for regulation.
