= Autoinjector =

Medical drug injection device

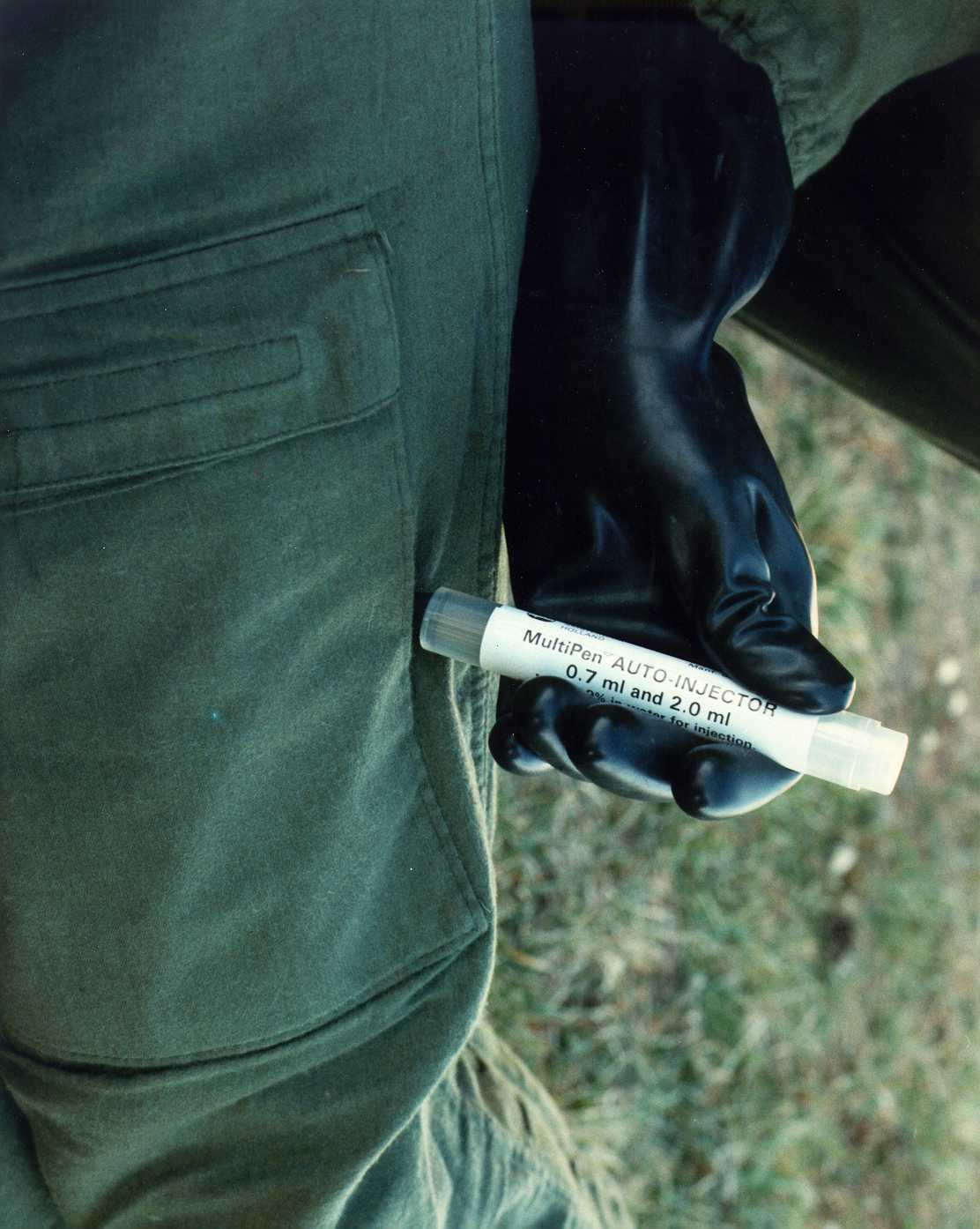
A military autoinjector in use

An autoinjector (or auto-injector), also known as self-injection pen, is a medical device for injection of a premeasured dose of a particular drug. Most autoinjectors are one-use, disposable, spring-loaded syringes (prefilled syringes). By design, autoinjectors are easy to use and are intended for self-administration by patients, administration by untrained personnel, or easy use by healthcare professionals; they can also overcome the hesitation associated with self-administration using a needle. The site of injection depends on the drug, but it typically is administered into the thigh or the buttocks.

Autoinjectors are sharps waste.

== History ==
Automatic syringes have existed since the 1910s, and many spring-loaded devices with needle protectors were patented in the first half of the 20th century. But it was not until 1970s when they became economically feasible to mass-produce (simple syrettes were used instead before). In 2023 an open source autoinjector was developed that could be digitally replicated with a low cost desktop 3D printer. It was tested against the then current standard (ISO 11608–1:2022) for needle-based injection systems and found to cost less than mass manufactured systems.

== Design ==
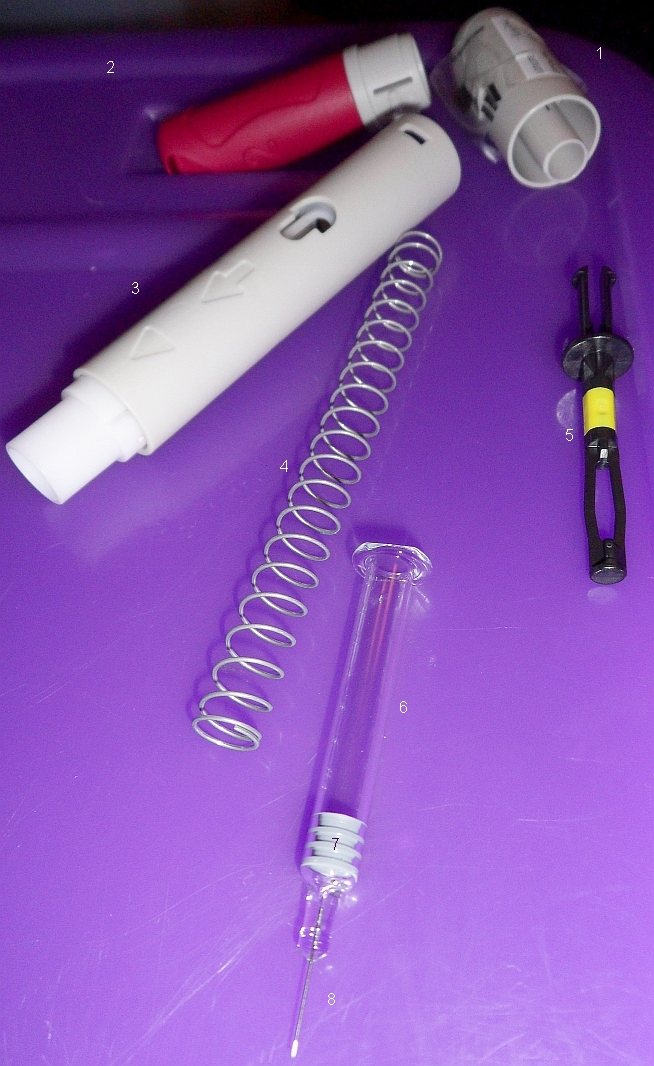
Components of a Humira autoinjector pen

Designs exist for both intramuscular and subcutaneous injection. Disposable autoinjectors commonly use a pre-loaded spring as a power source. This spring and the associated mechanical components form a one-shot linear actuator. When triggered the actuator drives a three-step sequence:

1. accelerate the syringe forward, puncturing the injection site
2. actuate the piston of the syringe, injecting the drug
3. deploy a shield to cover the needle

Some injectors are triggered by simply pushing the nose ring against the injection site. In these designs, the protective cap is the primary safety. Other designs use a safety mechanism similar to nail guns: The injection is triggered by pushing the nose ring against the injection site and simultaneously, while applying pressure, pushing a trigger button at the rear end of the device.

Since spent autoinjectors contain a hypodermic needle, they pose a potential biohazard to waste management workers. Hence the protective cap is designed not only to protect the drug and keep the needle sterile but also to provide adequate sharps waste confinement after disposal.

Injectors intended for application through layers of clothing may feature an adjustable injection depth. Other typical features include: A drug inspection window, a color-coded spent indicator, and an audible click after the injection has finished.

== Uses ==
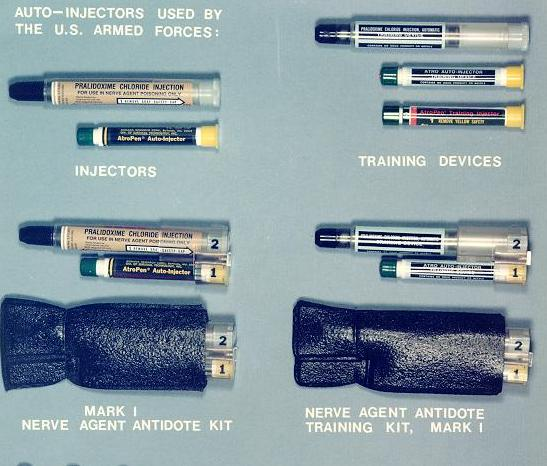
A variety of autoinjectors in use with the US Armed Forces

- Epinephrine autoinjectors are often prescribed to people who are at risk for anaphylaxis. Brand names include Anapen, EpiPen, Jext, Emerade, and Auvi-Q.
- Rebiject, Rebiject II and Rebidose autoinjectors for Rebif, the drug for interferon beta-1a used to treat multiple sclerosis. An autoinjector for the Avonex version of this same medication is also on the market.
- SureClick autoinjector is a combination product for drugs Enbrel or Aranesp to treat rheumatoid arthritis or anemia, respectively.
- Subcutaneous sumatriptan autoinjectors are used to terminate cluster headache attacks.
- Naloxone autoinjectors are being developed and prescribed to recreational opioid users to counteract the deadly effects of opioid overdose.

Military uses include:

- Autoinjectors are often used in the military to protect personnel from chemical warfare agents. In the U.S. military, atropine and 2-PAM-Cl (pralidoxime chloride) are used for first aid ("buddy aid" or "self aid") against nerve agents. An issue item, the Mark I NAAK (Nerve Agent Antidote Kit), provides these drugs in the form of two separate autoinjectors. A newer model, the ATNAA (Antidote Treatment Nerve Agent Auto-Injector), has both drugs in one syringe, allowing for the simplification of administration procedures. In the Gulf War, accidental and unnecessary use of atropine autoinjectors supplied to Israeli civilians proved to be a major medical problem.
- In concert with the Mark I NAAK, diazepam (Valium) autoinjectors, known as CANA, are carried by US service members.

== Variants ==
An injection of Auvi-Q autoinjector

Another design has a shape and size of a smartphone which can be put into a pocket. This design also has a retractable needle and automated voice instructions to assist the users on how to correctly use the autoinjector. The "Auvi-Q" epinephrine autoinjector uses this design.

A newer variant of the autoinjector is the gas jet autoinjector, which contains a cylinder of pressurized gas and propels a fine jet of liquid through the skin without using a needle. This has the advantage that patients who fear needles are more accepting of using these devices. The autoinjector can be reloaded, and various doses or different drugs can be used, although the only widespread application to date has been for the administration of insulin in the treatment of diabetes.

== See also ==
- Syrette
- Injector pen
