= Four thieves vinegar =

Infusion believed to protect from plague

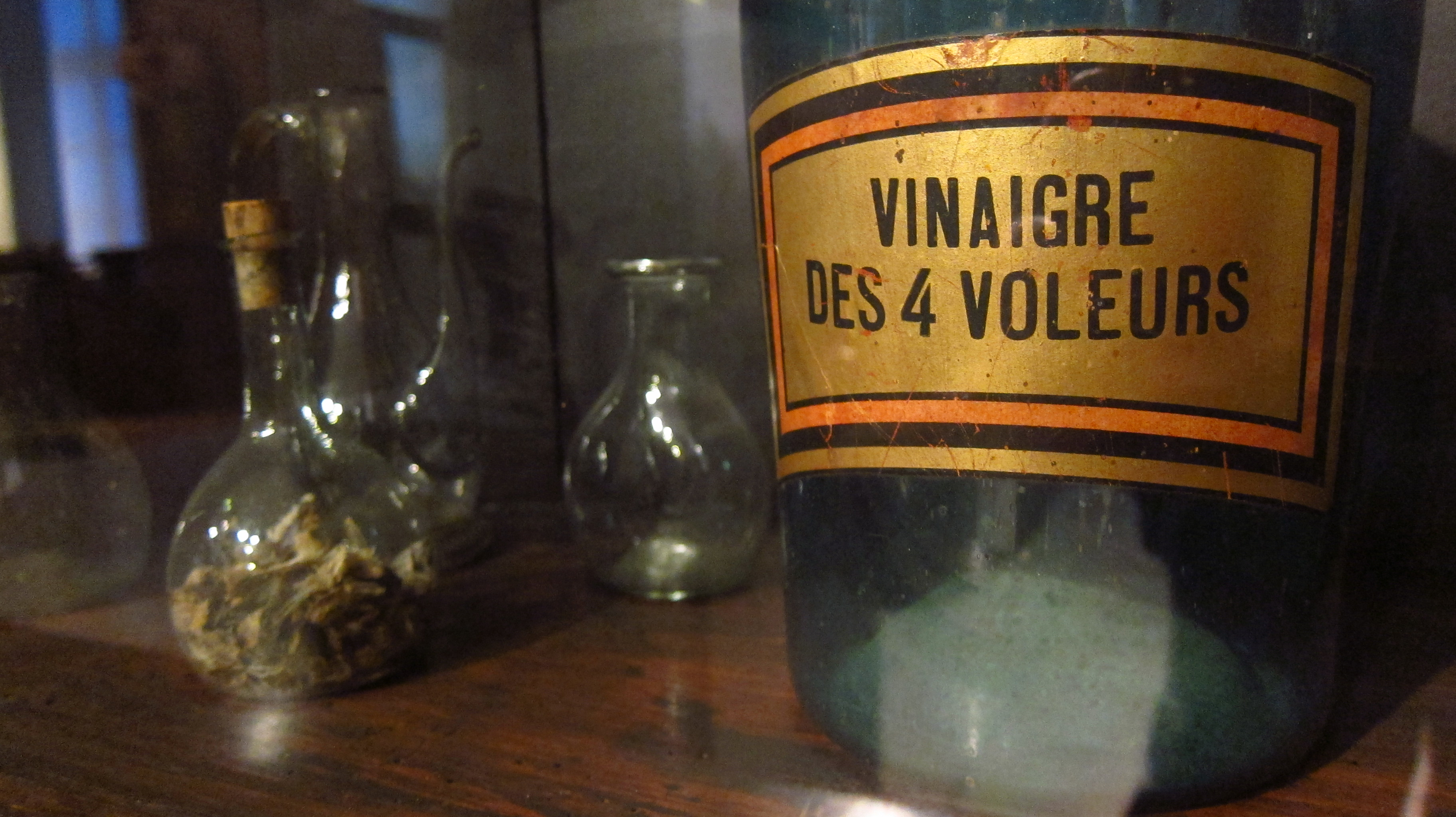
Vinaigre des quatre voleurs

Four thieves vinegar (also called thieves’ oil, Marseilles vinegar, Marseille's Remedy, prophylactic vinegar, vinegar of the four thieves, camphorated acetic acid, vinaigre des quatre voleurs and acetum quator furum) is a concoction of vinegar (either from red wine, white wine, cider, or distilled white) infused with herbs, spices or garlic that was believed to protect users from the plague.

== History ==
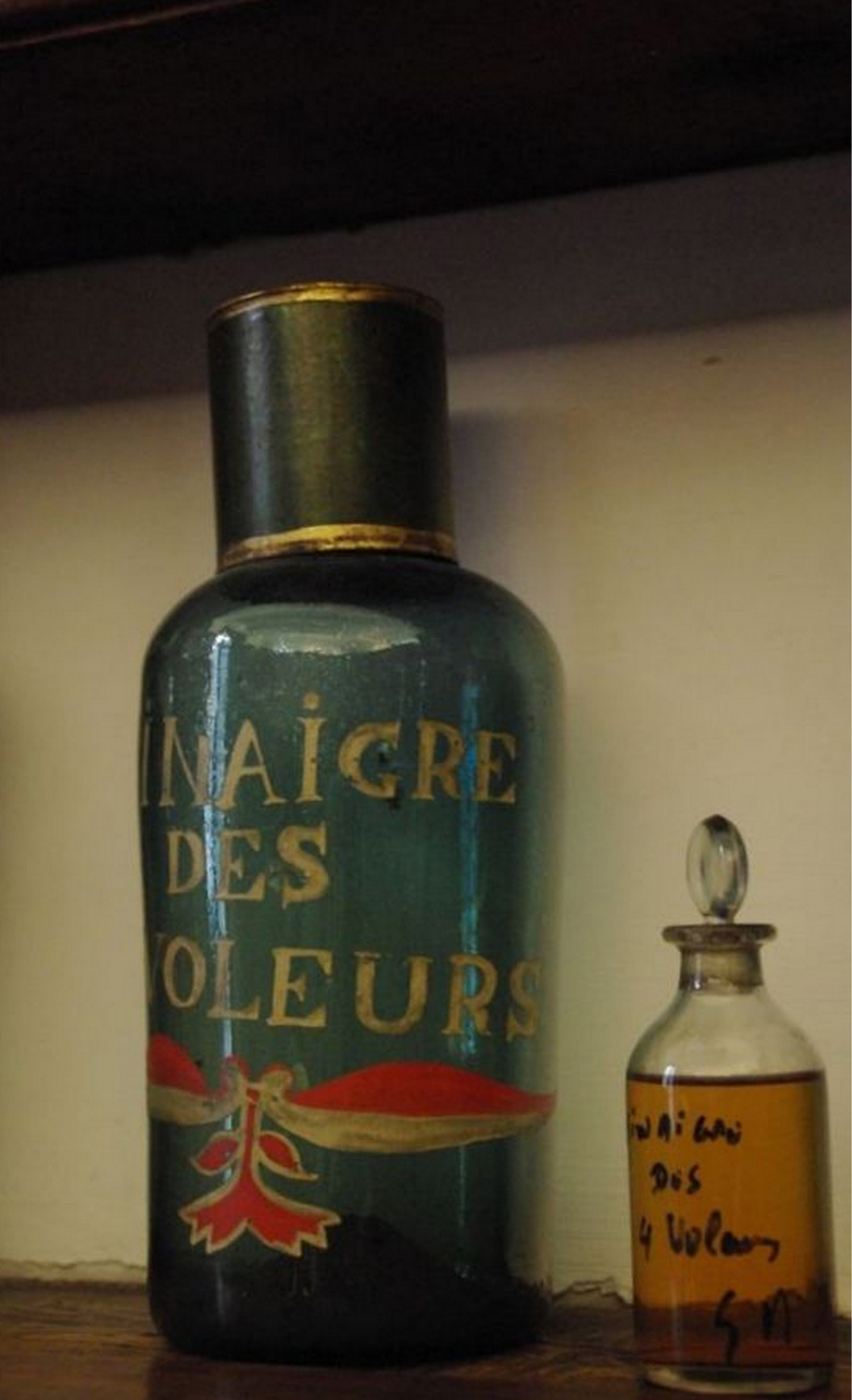
A 17th-century bottle

This specific vinegar composition is said to have been used during black death epidemic of the medieval period, to prevent the catching of the plague. Similar herbal vinegars have been used as medicine since the time of Hippocrates.

Early recipes for this vinegar called for a number of herbs to be added into a vinegar solution and left to steep for several days. The following vinegar recipe hung in the Museum of Paris in 1937, and is said to have been an original copy of the recipe posted on the walls of Marseille during an episode of the plague:

Take three pints of strong white wine vinegar, add a handful of each of wormwood, meadowsweet, wild marjoram and sage, fifty cloves, two ounces of campanula roots, two ounces of angelica, rosemary and horehound and three large measures of camphor. Place the mixture in a container for fifteen days, strain and express then bottle. Use by rubbing it on the hands, ears and temples from time to time when approaching a plague victim.

Plausible reasons for not contracting the plague was that the herbal concoction contained natural flea repellents, since the flea is the carrier for the plague bacillus, Yersinia pestis. Wormwood has properties similar to cedar as an insect repellent, as do aromatics such as sage, cloves, camphor, rosemary, and campanula. Meadowsweet, although known to contain salicylic acid, is mainly used to mask odors like decomposing bodies.

Another plausible reason for its effectiveness may be the antimicrobial properties of its constituents. Scientists have found wormwood, meadowsweet, wild marjoram, sage, cloves, campanula, angelica, rosemary, horehound and camphor to have antimicrobial properties.

Another recipe called for dried rosemary, dried sage flowers, dried lavender flowers, fresh rue, camphor dissolved in spirit, sliced garlic, bruised cloves, and distilled wine vinegar.

Modern-day versions include various herbs that typically include sage, lavender, thyme, and rosemary, along with garlic. Additional herbs sometimes include rue, mint, and wormwood. It has become traditional to use four herbs in the recipe—one for each thief, though earlier recipes often have a dozen herbs or more. It is still sold in Provence. In Italy a mixture called "seven thieves vinegar" is sold as a smelling salt, though its ingredients appear to be the same as in four thieves mixtures.

== Mythology ==
The usual story declares that a group of thieves during a European plague outbreak were robbing the dead or the sick. When they were caught, they offered to exchange their secret recipe, which had allowed them to commit the robberies without catching the disease, in exchange for leniency. Another version says that the thieves had already been caught before the outbreak and their sentence had been to bury dead plague victims; to survive this punishment, they created the vinegar. The city in which this happened is usually said to be Marseille or Toulouse, and the time period can be given as anywhere between the 14th and 18th century depending on the storyteller.

One source, the book Abrégé de toute la médecine pratique (1741), seems to attribute its creation to George Bates, though Bates' own published recipe for antipestilential vinegar in his Pharmacopoeia Bateana does not specifically use the name 'thieves' or 'four thieves'.

Another humorous snippet in The Mirror of Literature, Amusement, and Instruction, reads:

A report of the plague in 1760 having been circulated, Messrs. Chandler and Smith, apothecaries, in Cheapside, had taken in a third partner, (Mr. Newsom,) and while the report prevailed, these gentlemen availed themselves of the popular opinion, and put a written notice in their windows of "Four Thieves' Vinegar sold here." Mr. Ball, an old apothecary, was passing by, and observing this, went into the shop. "What," said he, "have you taken in another partner?"—"No."—"Oh! I beg your pardon," replied Ball, "I thought you had, by the ticket in your window."
