= Authorized generics =

Authorized generics are prescription drugs produced by brand pharmaceutical companies and marketed under a private label, at generic prices. Authorized generics compete with generic products in that they are identical to their brand counterpart in both active and inactive ingredients; whereas according to the U.S. Food and Drug Administration's Office of Generic Drugs, generic drugs are required to contain only the identical active ingredients as the brand. Authorized generics compete with generics on price, quality and availability in the generic marketplace, and are marketed to consumers during and after what is commonly known as “the 180-day exclusivity period”.

In 2011 the FTC issued a final report on authorized generics (following its 2009 interim report) that showed that when innovator companies launched authorized generics during the 180 day exclusivity period granted to the first generic company to file an ANDA, prices were significantly lower than when there was no authorized generic and no competition, thus benefiting consumers.

== Public studies ==
According to Roper Public Affairs & Media, 2005 public research underlines consumer demand to have authorized generic prescription drugs available, showing over 80 percent of Americans want the option of authorized generic prescription drugs. Several independent organizations, including Pharmaceutical Research and Manufacturers of America, Sonecon, and GPhA have commissioned their own studies on authorized generics, furthering the competitive debate.
