= List of Department of Health and Human Services appointments by Donald Trump =

Key
Appointees serving in offices that did not require Senate confirmation.
Appointees confirmed by the Senate who are currently serving or served through the entire term.
Appointees awaiting Senate confirmation.
Appointees serving in an acting capacity.
Appointees who have left office after confirmation or offices which have been disbanded.
Nominees who were withdrawn prior to being confirmed or assuming office.

== Appointments (first administration) ==
Office	Nominee	Assumed office	Left office
Secretary of Health and Human Services	Alex Azar	January 29, 2018 (Confirmed January 24, 2018, 55–43)	January 20, 2021
Secretary of Health and Human Services	Eric Hargan	October 10, 2017	January 28, 2018
Secretary of Health and Human Services	Don J. Wright	September 29, 2017	October 10, 2017
Secretary of Health and Human Services	Tom Price	February 10, 2017 (Confirmed February 10, 2017, 52–47)	September 29, 2017
Secretary of Health and Human Services	Norris Cochran	January 20, 2017	February 10, 2017
Deputy Secretary of Health and Human Services	Eric Hargan	October 6, 2017 (Confirmed October 4, 2017, 57–38)	January 20, 2021
General Counsel of Health and Human Services	Robert Charrow	January 2, 2018 (Confirmed December 21, 2017, voice vote)	January 20, 2021
Assistant Secretary of Health and Human Services (Planning and Evaluation)	Stephen Parente	Nomination lapsed and returned to the President on January 3, 2019	
Assistant Secretary of Health and Human Services (Children and Families)	Lynn A. Johnson	September 5, 2018 (Confirmed August 28, 2018, 67–28)	January 2021
Assistant Secretary of Health and Human Services (Health)	Brett Giroir	February 15, 2018 (Confirmed February 7, 2018, voice vote)	January 19, 2021
Assistant Secretary of Health and Human Services (Health)	Don J. Wright	February 10, 2017	February 15, 2018
Assistant Secretary of Health and Human Services (Preparedness and Response)	Robert Kadlec	August 18, 2017 (Confirmed August 3, 2017, voice vote)	January 20, 2021
Assistant Secretary of Health and Human Services (Legislation)	Sarah Arbes	March 21, 2020 (Confirmed March 21, 2020, voice vote)	January 20, 2021
Assistant Secretary of Health and Human Services (Legislation)	Sarah Arbes	June 2019	March 20, 2020
Assistant Secretary of Health and Human Services (Legislation)	Matthew Bassett	February 5, 2018 (Confirmed January 30, 2018, voice vote)	June 2019
Assistant Secretary of Health and Human Services (Public Affairs)
Assistant Secretary of Health and Human Services (Public Affairs)	Ryan Murphy	September 16, 2020	January 20, 2021
Assistant Secretary of Health and Human Services (Public Affairs)	Michael Caputo	April 16, 2020	September 16, 2020
Assistant Secretary of Health and Human Services (Public Affairs)	Ryan Murphy	October 2019	April 15, 2020
Assistant Secretary of Health and Human Services (Public Affairs)	Judy Stecker	April 5, 2018 (Appointed March 9, 2018)	October 2019
Assistant Secretary of Health and Human Services (Public Affairs)	Charmaine Yoest	May 14, 2017	February 28, 2018
Assistant Secretary of Health and Human Services (Financial Resources)	John Bartrum	Nomination lapsed and returned to the President on January 4, 2019	
Assistant Secretary of Health and Human Services (Aging)	Lance Allen Robertson	August 11, 2017 (Confirmed August 3, 2017, voice vote)	January 20, 2021
Administrator for Community Living	Lance Allen Robertson	August 11, 2017 (Confirmed August 3, 2017, voice vote)	January 20, 2021
Assistant Secretary for Mental Health (Substance Use)	Elinore McCance-Katz	September 11, 2017 (Confirmed August 3, 2017, voice vote)	January 7, 2021
Surgeon General of the United States	Jerome Adams	September 5, 2017 (Confirmed August 3, 2017, voice vote)	January 20, 2021
Surgeon General of the United States	Sylvia Trent-Adams	April 21, 2017	September 5, 2017
Inspector General of the United States Department of Health and Human Services	Christi Grimm	January 1, 2020	January 24, 2025*
Inspector General of the United States Department of Health and Human Services	Joanne Chiedi	June 1, 2019	December 27, 2019
Centers for Disease Control and Prevention
Director of the Centers for Disease Control and Prevention	Robert Redfield	March 26, 2018	January 20, 2021
Director of the Centers for Disease Control and Prevention	Anne Schuchat	January 31, 2018	March 26, 2018
Director of the Centers for Disease Control and Prevention	Brenda Fitzgerald	July 7, 2017	January 31, 2018
Director of the Centers for Disease Control and Prevention	Anne Schuchat	January 20, 2017	July 7, 2017
Administration for Children and Families
Commissioner of the Administrator of Children, Youth, and Families	Elizabeth Darling	September 2019 (Confirmed September 10, 2019, 57–37)	January 20, 2021
Centers for Medicare and Medicaid Services
Administrator of the Centers for Medicare and Medicaid Services	Seema Verma	March 14, 2017 (Confirmed March 14, 2017, 55–43)	January 20, 2021
Administration for Native Americans
Commissioner of the Administration for Native Americans	Jeannie Hovland	July 10, 2018 (Confirmed June 21, 2018, voice vote)	January 16, 2021
Indian Health Service
Director of the Indian Health Service	Michael Weahkee	April 2020 (Confirmed April 21, 2020, voice vote)	January 20, 2021
Director of the Indian Health Service	Michael Weahkee	June 2017	April 2020
Director of the Indian Health Service	Robert M. Weaver	Nomination withdrawn by the President on February 27, 2018	
Food and Drug Administration
Commissioner of Food and Drugs	Stephen Hahn	December 17, 2019 (Confirmed December 12, 2019, 72–18	January 20, 2021
Commissioner of Food and Drugs	Brett Giroir	November 6, 2019	December 16, 2019
Commissioner of Food and Drugs	Norman Sharpless	April 5, 2019	November 1, 2019
Commissioner of Food and Drugs	Scott Gottlieb	May 11, 2017 (Confirmed May 9, 2017, 57–42)	April 5, 2019
National Cancer Institute
Director of the National Cancer Institute	Norman Sharpless	October 17, 2017	April 30, 2022
Office of Public Health and Science
Co-Chair and Member of the President's Council on Sports, Fitness, and Nutrition	Mariano Rivera	May 2018	
Co-Chair and Member of the President's Council on Sports, Fitness, and Nutrition	Misty May-Treanor	May 2018	
Co-Chair and Member of the President's Council on Sports, Fitness, and Nutrition	Herschel Walker	May 2018	
Member of the President's Council on Sports, Fitness, and Nutrition	Brenda Becker	May 2018	
Member of the President's Council on Sports, Fitness, and Nutrition	Bill Belichick	May 2018	
Member of the President's Council on Sports, Fitness, and Nutrition	Johnny Damon	May 2018	
Member of the President's Council on Sports, Fitness, and Nutrition	Trevor Drinkwater	May 2018	
Member of the President's Council on Sports, Fitness, and Nutrition	Lou Ferrigno	May 2018	
Member of the President's Council on Sports, Fitness, and Nutrition	Robert Goldman	May 2018	
Member of the President's Council on Sports, Fitness, and Nutrition	Nan Hayworth	May 2018	
Member of the President's Council on Sports, Fitness, and Nutrition	Matthew Hesse	May 2018	
Member of the President's Council on Sports, Fitness, and Nutrition	Ashlee Lundvall	May 2018	
Member of the President's Council on Sports, Fitness, and Nutrition	Jacob Olson	May 2018	
Member of the President's Council on Sports, Fitness, and Nutrition	Mehmet Oz	May 2018	
Member of the President's Council on Sports, Fitness, and Nutrition	Natalie Gulbis Rodarmel	May 2018	
Member of the President's Council on Sports, Fitness, and Nutrition	Shauna Rohbock	May 2018	
Member of the President's Council on Sports, Fitness, and Nutrition	Kyle Snyder	May 2018	
Member of the President's Council on Sports, Fitness, and Nutrition	Stephen Soloway	May 2018	
Member of the President's Council on Sports, Fitness, and Nutrition	Julie Teer	May 2018	
Member of the President's Council on Sports, Fitness, and Nutrition	Chris Tisi	May 2018	
Member of the President's Council on Sports, Fitness, and Nutrition	Robert Charles Wilkins	May 2018	
Member of the President's Council on Sports, Fitness, and Nutrition	Samuel James Worthington Jr.	May 2018	
Member of the President's Council on Sports, Fitness, and Nutrition	Linda Yaccarino	May 2018	

== Appointments (second administration) ==
Office	Nominee	Assumed office	Left office
Secretary of Health and Human Services	Robert F. Kennedy Jr.	February 13, 2025 (Confirmed February 13, 2025, 52–48)	
Secretary of Health and Human Services	Dorothy Fink	January 20, 2025	February 13, 2025
Deputy Secretary of Health and Human Services	Gerard Klomp	Awaiting Senate Confirmation	
Deputy Secretary of Health and Human Services	Jim O'Neill	June 9, 2025 (Confirmed June 5, 2025, 52–43)	February 13, 2026
General Counsel of Health and Human Services	Robert Fox Foster	May 29, 2026	October 9, 2026
General Counsel of Health and Human Services	Michael Stuart	October 9, 2025 (Confirmed* October 7, 2025, 51–47); *En bloc confirmation of 107 nominees.	May 29, 2026
Assistant Secretary of Health and Human Services for Planning and Evaluation	Ge Bai	Awaiting Senate Confirmation	
Assistant Secretary of Health and Human Services for Children & Families	Alex Adams	November 24, 2025 (Confirmed* October 7, 2025, 51–47); *En bloc confirmation of 107 nominees.	
Assistant Secretary for Health	Brian Christine	November 11, 2025 (Confirmed* October 7, 2025, 51–47); *En bloc confirmation of 107 nominees.	
Assistant Secretary of Health and Human Services for Financial Resources	Gustav Chiarello	October 23, 2025 (Confirmed* October 7, 2025, 51–47); *En bloc confirmation of 107 nominees.	
Assistant Secretary of Health and Human Services for Legislation	Gary Andres	June 23, 2025 (Confirmed June 17, 2025, 57–40)	
Assistant Secretary of Health and Human Services for Preparedness and Response	Sean Kaufman	Awaiting Senate Confirmation	
Assistant Secretary of Health and Human Services for Preparedness and Response	John Knox	January 20, 2025	
Assistant Secretary of Health and Human Services for Substance Use and Mental Health	Timothy Westlake	Awaiting Senate Confirmation	
Assistant Secretary of Health and Human Services for Aging	Mary Lazare	Awaiting Senate Confirmation	
Assistant Secretary of Health and Human Services for Aging	Mary Lazare	March 3, 2025	
Administrator for Community Living	Mary Lazare	March 3, 2025	
Assistant Secretary of Health and Human Services for Public Affairs	Courtney Parella Spencer	May 27, 2026	
Surgeon General of the United States	Nicole Saphier	Awaiting Senate Confirmation	
Surgeon General of the United States	Stephanie Haridopolos	May 20, 2026	
Surgeon General of the United States	Casey Means	Nomination withdrawn by the President on April 30, 2026	
Surgeon General of the United States	Janette Nesheiwat	Nomination withdrawn by the President on May 7, 2025	
Surgeon General of the United States	Denise Hinton	January 20, 2025	September 29, 2025
Inspector General of Health and Human Services	Thomas March Bell	December 22, 2025 (Confirmed* December 18, 2025, 53–43); *En bloc confirmation of 97 nominees.	
Inspector General of Health and Human Services	Juliet T. Hodgkins	January 24, 2025	December 22, 2025
Centers for Disease Control and Prevention
Director of the Centers for Disease Control and Prevention	Erica Schwartz	August 12, 2026 (Confirmed August 5, 2026, 51–44)	
Director of the Centers for Disease Control and Prevention	Jay Bhattacharya	February 18, 2026	August 12, 2026
Director of the Centers for Disease Control and Prevention	Jim O'Neill	August 28, 2025	February 13, 2026
Director of the Centers for Disease Control and Prevention	Susan Monarez	July 31, 2025 (Confirmed July 29, 2025, 51–47)	August 27, 2025
Director of the Centers for Disease Control and Prevention	Susan Monarez	January 23, 2025	March 24, 2025
Director of the Centers for Disease Control and Prevention	Dave Weldon	Nomination withdrawn by the President on March 13, 2025	
Centers for Medicare & Medicaid Services
Administrator of the Centers for Medicare & Medicaid Services	Mehmet Oz	April 8, 2025 (Confirmed April 3, 2025, 53–45)	
Administrator of the Centers for Medicare & Medicaid Services	Stephanie Carlton	January 31, 2025	April 8, 2025
Administrator of the Centers for Medicare & Medicaid Services	Jeffrey Wu	January 20, 2025	January 31, 2025
Food and Drug Administration
Commissioner of Food and Drugs
Commissioner of Food and Drugs	Heidi Overton	Nomination withdrawn by the President on November 17, 2026	
Commissioner of Food and Drugs	Kyle Diamantas	May 15, 2026	
Commissioner of Food and Drugs	Marty Makary	April 1, 2025 (Confirmed March 25, 2025, 56–44)	May 13, 2026
Commissioner of Food and Drugs	Sara Brenner	January 24, 2025	April 1, 2025
Indian Health Service
Director of the Indian Health Service	Mark Cruz	August 21, 2026 (Confirmed August 7, 2026, 51–47)	
National Institutes of Health
Director of the National Institutes of Health	Jay Bhattacharya	April 1, 2025 (Confirmed March 25, 2025, 53–47)	
Director of the National Institutes of Health	Matthew Memoli	January 22, 2025	March 31, 2025
National Cancer Institute
Director of the National Cancer Institute	Anthony Letai	September 28, 2025	
Director of the National Cancer Institute	Douglas R. Lowy	January 21, 2025	September 28, 2025

== Notes ==
=== Confirmation votes ===
Confirmations by roll call vote (first administration)

Confirmations by voice vote (first administration)

Confirmations by roll call vote (second administration)

Confirmations by voice vote (second administration)
