= Thomas Tierney =

Thomas Tierney may refer to:

- Thomas Tierney (mayor), mayor of Galway, Ireland
- Thomas J. Tierney, American business executive, formerly chairman of eBay
- Thomas M. Tierney, American administrator, director of the Bureau of Health Insurance
