= Howard N. Newman =

American healthcare administrator and public servant

- Born: Howard Neal Newman; 1935; New York City, U.S.
- Died: May 7, 2011 (aged 75–76); Oakland, California, U.S.
- Education: Dartmouth College (AB, MBA); Columbia University (MS); Temple University Beasley School of Law (JD)
- Occupations: Healthcare administrator, government official, educator
- Known for: Administrator of the Health Care Financing Administration

Howard Neal Newman (1935 – May 7, 2011) was an American healthcare administrator, government official, attorney, and educator. He served as Administrator of the Health Care Financing Administration (HCFA), now the Centers for Medicare & Medicaid Services (CMS), from 1980 to 1981 during the administration of President Jimmy Carter. Earlier in his career, he served as Commissioner of the Medical Services Administration in the United States Department of Health, Education, and Welfare, where he oversaw aspects of the federal Medicaid program. He later became the first president of the Dartmouth–Hitchcock Medical Center and served as dean of the Robert F. Wagner Graduate School of Public Service at New York University.

== Early life and education ==
Newman was born in New York City in 1935. He graduated from Dartmouth College with a Bachelor of Arts degree in 1956 and received a master of business administration from the institution's Tuck School of Business in 1957. He later earned a Master of Science in public health from Columbia University in 1959 and studied law at Temple University Beasley School of Law, where he received a Juris Doctor degree.

== Early career ==
Newman began his career in hospital administration at Roosevelt Hospital in New York City. He later joined Pennsylvania Hospital in Philadelphia, where he continued to work in hospital administration while pursuing legal studies. In 1968, Newman was selected as a White House Fellow and served in the Office of Management and Budget. Following the fellowship, he joined the United States Department of Health, Education, and Welfare (HEW), where he became Commissioner of the Medical Services Administration. In that role, he worked on the administration of the federal Medicaid program during its early years following its establishment in 1965.

== Dartmouth–Hitchcock Medical Center ==
In 1974, Newman was appointed the first president of the Dartmouth–Hitchcock Medical Center, a newly established organization bringing together the Geisel School of Medicine, Mary Hitchcock Memorial Hospital, the Hitchcock Clinic, and the Veterans Administration Hospital in White River Junction, Vermont. As the center's first chief executive officer, he was responsible for coordinating the operations of its constituent institutions during its formative years.

== Administrator of the Health Care Financing Administration ==
Newman returned to federal service in July 1980 when he was appointed Administrator of the Health Care Financing Administration, succeeding Leonard D. Schaeffer. During his tenure, HCFA was responsible for administering the Medicare and Medicaid programs and overseeing implementation of federal healthcare financing policies. He served until January 1981, after which Carolyne K. Davis became Administrator under the Reagan administration.

Political offices
Preceded by Leonard D. Schaeffer	Administrator of the Health Care Financing Administration; 1980–1981	Succeeded by Carolyne K. Davis
