= Elizabeth Richter =

Former acting administrator of the Centers for Medicare and Medicaid Services

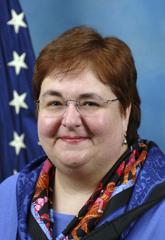

Administrator of the Centers for Medicare and Medicaid Services
- Acting
- In office January 20, 2021 – May 27, 2021
- President: Joe Biden
- Deputy: Demetrios Kouzoukas; Jeff Wu (acting)
- Preceded by: Seema Verma
- Succeeded by: Chiquita Brooks-LaSure

Elizabeth Richter is an American government official who served as the acting administrator of the Centers for Medicare & Medicaid Services from January to May 2021.

== Career ==
Richter has served with the Centers for Medicare and Medicaid Services since she joined the Bureau of Policy Development in 1990. In 1998, she transferred to the Office of Financial Management, where three years later she became the Director of the Financial Services Group. In 2003, Richter became the Director of the Hospital and Ambulatory Policy Group. Most recently, she has served as the deputy director of the Center for Medicare since 2007. In 2021, Joe Biden appointed Richter to succeed Seema Verma as acting administrator until a permanent administrator is confirmed. Richter stayed in that office until her successor, Chiquita Brooks-LaSure was confirmed and sworn in on May 27, 2021.

Political offices
Preceded by Seema Verma	Administrator of the Centers for Medicare and Medicaid Services; January 2021 – May 2021	Succeeded by Chiquita Brooks-LaSure
