= Slavitt =

Slavitt is a surname. Notable people with the surname include:

- Andy Slavitt (born 1966), American businessman and healthcare advisor
- David R. Slavitt (1935-2025), American writer, poet, and translator
