= Leonard Schaeffer =

American health care executive and former government official

Leonard D. Schaeffer

Administrator of the Health Care Financing Administration
- In office November 1978 – June 1980
- President: Jimmy Carter
- Preceded by: Robert Derzon
- Succeeded by: Howard N. Newman

Leonard D. Schaeffer is an American health care executive, academic, and former government official. He was Administrator of the Health Care Financing Administration (HCFA), now the Centers for Medicare & Medicaid Services (CMS), from November 1978 to June 1980 during the administration of President Jimmy Carter. After leaving government, he became chief executive of Blue Cross of California and later chairman and chief executive officer of WellPoint Health Networks. He is the Judge Robert Maclay Widney Chair at the University of Southern California and founded the USC Schaeffer Center for Health Policy & Economics.

== Career ==
Before joining the federal government, Schaeffer held several positions in Illinois state government, including Director of the Bureau of the Budget and Chairman of the Illinois Capital Development Board. During the Carter administration, he was Assistant Secretary for Management and Budget at the United States Department of Health, Education, and Welfare.

Schaeffer was appointed Administrator of the Health Care Financing Administration in November 1978. During his tenure, HCFA completed the transfer of Medicare operations from the Social Security Administration to the agency's headquarters in Baltimore, bringing the administration of Medicare and Medicaid under one organization.

After leaving HCFA in 1980, Schaeffer became president of Group Health Inc. In 1986, he joined Blue Cross of California as chairman and chief executive officer. He later worked for WellPoint Health Networks, as chief executive until 2004 and chairman until 2005.

Schaeffer joined the faculty of the University of Southern California in 2005. In 2009, he and his wife Pamela established the USC Schaeffer Center for Health Policy & Economics, which conducts research on health care policy, economics, and aging.

Political offices
Preceded by Robert Derzon	Administrator of the Health Care Financing Administration; 1978–1980	Succeeded by Howard N. Newman
