= McCance =

McCance is a surname. Notable people with the surname include:

- Chester McCance (1911–1956), Canadian football player
- Keith McCance (1929–2008), Australian politician
- John McCance (1775-1832), Irish politician
- Robert McCance (1898–1993), British academic
- Sean E. McCance, American orthopedic surgeon
- William McCance (1894–1970), Scottish artist

== See also ==
- Elinore McCance-Katz, American physician, academic and government official
- McCance Glacier, a glacier of Antarctica
