= Thomas M. Tierney =

2nd Director of the Bureau of Health Insurance
- In office 1967–1978
- President: Lyndon B. Johnson; Richard Nixon; Gerald Ford; Jimmy Carter
- Preceded by: Arthur E. Hess
- Succeeded by: Robert Derzon

Personal details
- Born: February 25, 1919 Colorado Springs, Colorado
- Died: May 18, 2001 (aged 82) Baltimore, Maryland
- Party: Democratic

Thomas M. Tierney (February 25, 1919 – May 18, 2001) was an American administrator who served as the Director of the Bureau of Health Insurance from 1967 to 1978.

He died of cancer on May 18, 2001, in Baltimore, Maryland at age 82.
