= Bill Hazel =

American politician and surgeon

12th Virginia Secretary of Health and Human Resources
- In office January 16, 2010 – January 13, 2018
- Governor: Bob McDonnell; Terry McAuliffe
- Preceded by: Marilyn Tavenner
- Succeeded by: Daniel Carey

Personal details
- Born: William Andrew Hazel, Jr. Arlington, Virginia, U.S.
- Spouse: Cindy Love
- Education: Princeton University (B.S.E.); Duke University (M.D.)

William Andrew Hazel, Jr. is an American politician and surgeon. He was the Virginia Secretary of Health and Human Resources, first appointed in 2010 by Governor Bob McDonnell and was reappointed in 2014 by Governor Terry McAuliffe. He served previously as assistant orthopedic surgeon for the Washington Redskins and as team physician for D.C. United soccer club; he was also a member of the American Medical Association's Board of Trustees.

Political offices
Preceded by Marilyn Tavenner	Virginia Secretary of Health and Human Resources; 2010–present	Succeeded by Incumbent
