= Donald Berwick =

American government official

Don Berwick
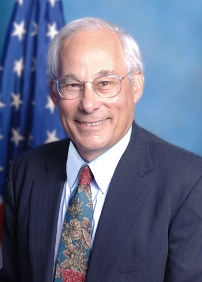

13th Administrator of the Centers for Medicare and Medicaid Services
- In office July 7, 2010 – December 2, 2011
- President: Barack Obama
- Preceded by: Charlene Frizzera (acting)
- Succeeded by: Marilyn Tavenner

Personal details
- Born: September 9, 1946 (age 80)
- Party: Democratic
- Spouse: Ann Berwick
- Children: 4
- Education: Harvard University (BA, MD, MPP)

Donald M. Berwick (born September 9, 1946) is a former Administrator of the Centers for Medicare and Medicaid Services (CMS). Prior to his work in the administration, he was President and Chief Executive Officer of the Institute for Healthcare Improvement a not-for-profit organization.

On July 7, 2010, President Barack Obama appointed Berwick to serve as the Administrator of CMS through a recess appointment. On December 2, 2011, he resigned because of heavy Republican opposition to his appointment and his potential inability to win a confirmation vote. On June 18, 2013, Berwick declared his candidacy for governor of Massachusetts, but lost the Democratic Party nomination to Attorney General Martha Coakley.

Berwick has studied the management of health care systems, with emphasis on using scientific methods and evidence-based medicine and comparative effectiveness research to improve the tradeoff among quality, safety, and costs.

Among IHI's projects are online courses for health care professionals for reducing Clostridioides difficile infections, lowering the number of heart failure readmissions or managing advanced disease and palliative care. In March 2012 he joined the Center for American Progress as a Senior Fellow.

== Early life and education ==
Berwick was born in New York and grew up in Moodus, Connecticut. His father, Philip, worked as the town's family doctor. His mother, Rosalind Fine, was the primary caretaker of Berwick and his two younger brothers until she died from ovarian cancer in 1961. Because of Fine's efforts to promote the construction of a new elementary school in Moodus, the school's library was named after her when it was built.

Berwick has said that he was motivated by his Jewish upbringing. "The ethical foundations of Judaism speak to me about being proper stewards of society and the world," said Berwick. "It affects my views and reminds us all we are in this together and really have to help each other," he said. "I'm worried about the failure to realize progressive issues I care about: healthcare as a human right, poverty and justice. These issues are under siege in America."

Berwick graduated from Nathan Hale-Ray High School and went on to obtain his A.B. from Harvard College, where he graduated summa cum laude. Berwick earned both an M.D. cum laude from Harvard Medical School and an M.P.P. from John F. Kennedy School of Government in 1972. He completed his medical residency in pediatrics at Children's Hospital Boston.

== Career ==
Berwick began his career as a pediatrician at Harvard Community Health Plan; in 1983 he became the plan's first Vice President of Quality-of-Care Measurement. In that position, Berwick investigated quality control measures in other industries such as aeronautics and manufacturing, in order to consider their application in health care settings. From 1987 to 1991, Berwick was co-founder and Co-Principal Investigator for the National Demonstration Project on Quality Improvement in Health Care, designed to explore opportunities for quality improvement in health care. Based on this work, Berwick left Harvard Community Health Plan in 1989 and co-founded the IHI (Institute for Healthcare Improvement).

Berwick is Clinical Professor of Pediatrics and Health Care Policy in the Department of Pediatrics at the Harvard Medical School and Professor of Health Policy and Management at the Harvard School of Public Health. He is also a pediatrician, Adjunct Staff in the Department of Medicine at Children's Hospital Boston, and a Consultant in Pediatrics at Massachusetts General Hospital.

=== Administrator of the Centers for Medicare and Medicaid Services, 2010-2011 ===
On April 19, 2010, Berwick was nominated to be Administrator of the Centers for Medicare and Medicaid Services, which oversees the two federal programs.

Berwick said, "20 percent to 30 percent of health spending is 'waste' that yields no benefit to patients, and that some of the needless spending is a result of onerous, archaic regulations enforced by his agency." Berwick's critics have cited his statements about the need for health care to redistribute resources from the rich to the poor and his favorable statements about the British health service. They quote Berwick as saying, "The decision is not whether or not we will ration care—the decision is whether we will ration with our eyes open."

Berwick said Republicans had "distorted" his meaning when he said, "My point is that someone, like your health insurance company, is going to limit what you can get. That's the way it's set up. The government, unlike many private health insurance plans, is working in the daylight. That's a strength." For political reasons, the Obama administration didn't want Berwick to defend his past statements on the British health service, spending caps and high-technology care.

An editorial wrote that his policy ideas could cut health care costs. Conservatives criticized Berwick, based on comments he made about health care being, by definition, redistribution of wealth, rationing care with "our eyes open" and complete lives system.

Berwick advocated cutting health costs by adopting some of the approaches of Great Britain's National Health Services (NHS) and its National Institute for Health and Clinical Excellence (NICE). NICE evaluates the costs and effectiveness of medical therapy that is covered by the NHS as guidance for local authorities to decide what to cover. Mark McClellan, who served in the Bush administration, also advocated adopting some of NICE's methods.

Conservative critics claim, "NICE decides which healthcare people will get and which they won't." Philip Klein in The American Spectator dubbed him "Obama's Rationing Man". The chairman of NICE called these statements "outrageous lies".

Senator John Kerry defended Berwick against "phony assertions" and accused Republicans of trying "to crank up the attack machine and make his nomination a distorted referendum on reform". Former Speaker Newt Gingrich has historically been a Republican supporter of Berwick, however, writing an op-ed in The Washington Post in August 2000 praising Berwick's work.

Berwick was installed by recess appointment on July 7, 2010, before confirmation hearings were scheduled by the Democratic-controlled Senate committee. Berwick could thus serve until the summer of 2011 without a Senate approval. The White House had talked up the possibility of a re-nomination through the fall of 2010; on January 26, 2011, the President re-nominated Berwick. On March 4, 2011, 42 U.S. Senators wrote the White House and asked for the nomination to be withdrawn. The signers of the letter were all Republicans.

Berwick resigned his position at CMS on December 2, 2011. In a speech on Wednesday, December 7, 2011, in Orlando, Florida, at a meeting of the Institute for Healthcare Improvement, an organization he once led, the long-time patient-safety advocate gave an account of his time in government service and where he believes the future of healthcare is going.

=== Work in the UK ===
Donald Berwick was the lead author of the Berwick Report, a seminal report into patient safety in England, following the Stafford Hospital scandal.

Berwick was knighted in 2005 for his work creating new care models in five trusts in the UK's National Health Service—acute care hospitals, multi-specialty groups, accident emergency rooms, mental health, and nursing homes.

=== 2014 Massachusetts gubernatorial election ===
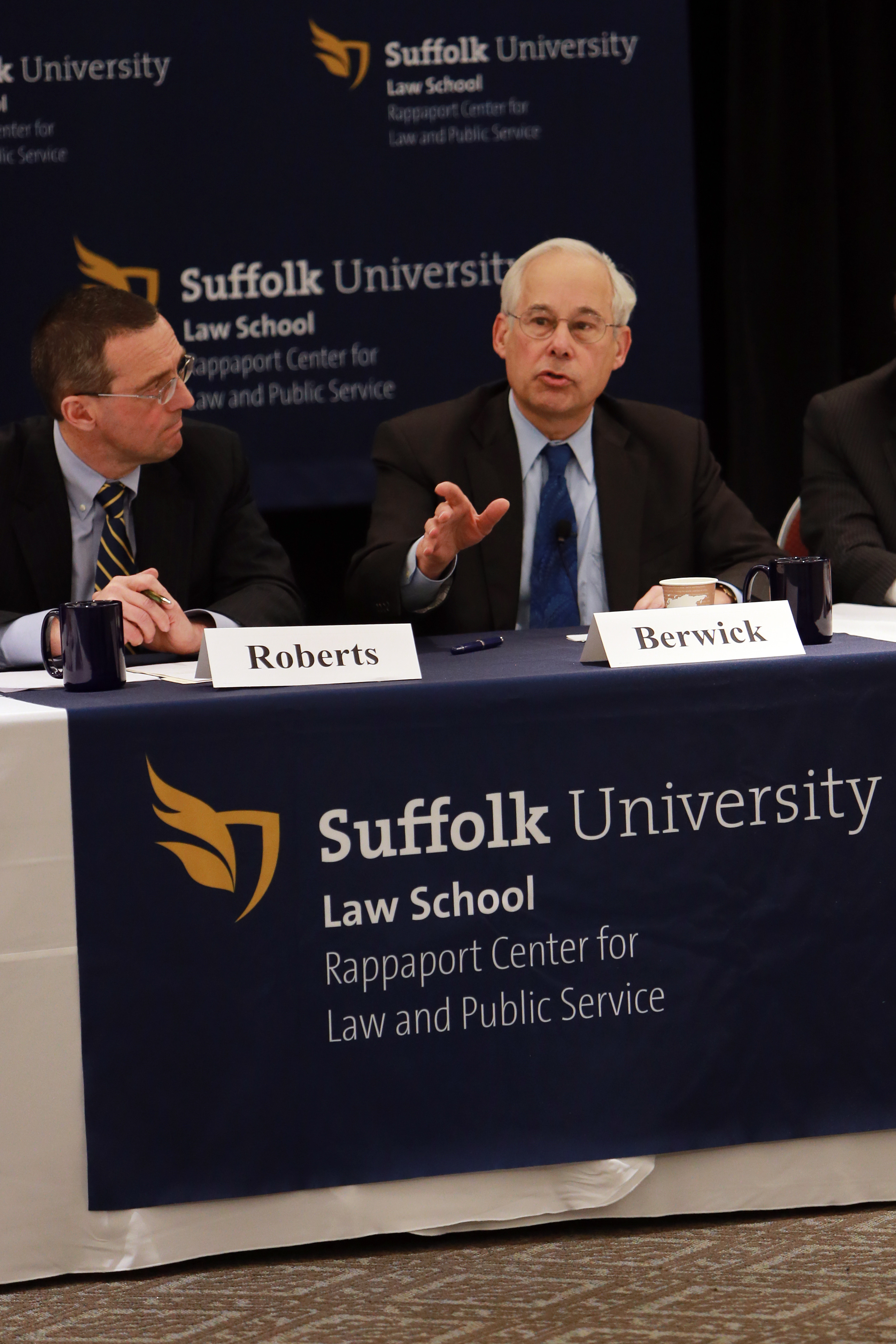
Don Berwick speaking at the Rappaport Center for Law and Public Service, Suffolk Law School on January 15, 2014

On June 17, 2013, Berwick announced his run for the Massachusetts Governor's office. Berwick framed himself as progressive on major issues and said it was crucial that Massachusetts continue to focus on health care reform and the well-being of children, topics he has focused on during his career. Berwick, who holds three degrees from Harvard, repeatedly emphasized his experience in helping health organizations deliver better care to consumers, an asset he said he would bring to being the state's chief executive.

Some of Berwick's specific goals for the governorship included focusing on job creation and economic development, instituting single-payer healthcare in Massachusetts, and ending child poverty in the state by the year 2024. Following the conviction of former probation commissioner John O'Brien on corruption charges, Berwick added that rooting out corruption would be another priority.

Although Berwick was seen as the heir to the Massachusetts trend of electing political outsiders to high offices, like Governor Deval Patrick and Senator Elizabeth Warren, pundits raised concerns in the Summer of 2014 that Berwick had failed to gain the traction he needed to succeed in the primary. However, he outperformed nearly all projections and pollsters in the Democratic primary with 21% of the vote, which prompted the recognition of him being a "surprise" in the race.

Berwick conceded the Democratic nomination to Massachusetts Attorney General Martha Coakley on September 9, 2014, who lost to Republican Charlie Baker at the general election.

== Personal life ==
While at Harvard, Berwick met his future wife, Ann, in his freshman biology class, where they were lab partners. The couple have four children.

== Publications ==
Berwick has published over 129 articles in professional journals on health care policy, decision analysis, technology assessment, and health care quality management. He is the co-author of several books, including Cholesterol, Children, and Heart Disease: an Analysis of Alternatives (1980), Curing Health Care (1990), and New Rules: Regulation, Markets and the Quality of American Health Care (1996). In February 2013, he participated as a speaker on Voices in Leadership, an original Harvard T.H. Chan School of Public Health webcast series, in a discussion titled, "Leadership in the Next Steps on Health Reform," moderated by Dr. John McDonough.

== Awards and honors ==
- Ernest A. Codman Award, 1999
- Alfred I. DuPont Award for excellence in children's healthcare, 2001
- American Hospital Association, "Award of Honor", 2002
- Fellow of the Royal College of Physicians in London, 2004
- Honorary Knight Commander of the Most Excellent Order of the British Empire, 2005
- Purpose Prize for "enlisting wide-scale cooperation and scientifically-proven protocols to help hospitals improve care and save more than 100,000 lives", 2007
- The 13th Annual Heinz Award for Public Policy, 2007
- Honorary Fellowship of the Royal College of Physicians of Ireland, Dublin October 20, 2012
- Membership to the American Philosophical Society, 2016

== Selected bibliography ==
=== Books ===
- Berwick DM, Cretin S, Keeler EB (1980). Cholesterol, children, and heart disease: an analysis of alternatives. Vol. 68. New York: Oxford University Press. pp. 721–30. doi:10.1542/peds.68.5.721. ISBN 978-0-19-502669-6. PMID 6796932. S2CID 24447926.
- Berwick DM, Godfrey AB, Roessner J (1990). Curing health care: new strategies for quality improvement. A report on the National Demonstration Project on Quality Improvement in Health Care. San Francisco: Jossey-Bass. ISBN 978-1-55542-294-3.
- Brennan TA, Berwick DM (1996). New rules: regulation, markets, and the quality of American health care. San Francisco: Jossey-Bass. ISBN 978-0-7879-0149-3.
- Berwick DM (2004). Escape fire. Designs for the future of health care. San Francisco: Jossey-Bass. ISBN 978-0-7879-7217-2.

=== Articles ===
- Read JL, Quinn RJ, Berwick DM, Fineberg HV, Weinstein MC (1984). "Preferences for health outcomes. Comparison of assessment methods". Medical Decision Making. 4 (3): 315–29. doi:10.1177/0272989X8400400307. PMID 6335216. S2CID 38825475..
- Berwick DM, Weinstein MC (July 1985). "What do patients value? Willingness to pay for ultrasound in normal pregnancy". Med Care. 23 (7): 881–93. doi:10.1097/00005650-198507000-00005. PMID 3925259. S2CID 20520967..
- Murphy JM, Berwick DM, Weinstein MC, Borus JF, Budman SH, Klerman GL (June 1987). "Performance of screening and diagnostic tests. Application of receiver operating characteristic analysis". Arch. Gen. Psychiatry. 44 (6): 550–5. doi:10.1001/archpsyc.1987.01800180068011. PMID 3579501..
- Berwick, Donald M. (January 1989). "Continuous improvement as an ideal in health care". The New England Journal of Medicine. 320 (1): 53–6. doi:10.1056/NEJM198901053200110. PMID 2909878..
- Perrin, James M.; Homer, Charles J.; Berwick, Donald M.; Woolf, Alan D.; Freeman, Jean L.; Wennberg, John E. (May 1989). "Variations in rates of hospitalization of children in three urban communities". The New England Journal of Medicine. 320 (18): 1183–7. doi:10.1056/NEJM198905043201805. PMID 2710191..
- Ayanian JZ, Berwick DM (1991). "Do physicians have a bias toward action? A classic study revisited". Medical Decision Making. 11 (3): 154–8. doi:10.1177/0272989X9101100302. PMID 1881269. S2CID 208519000..
- Berwick, Donald M. (1995). "The Toxicity of Pay for Performance" (PDF). Quality Management in Health Care. 4 (1): 27–33. doi:10.1097/00019514-199504010-00003. PMID 10151623. S2CID 30620021..
- Berwick DM (March 1996). "A primer on leading the improvement of systems". The BMJ. 312 (7031): 619–22. doi:10.1136/bmj.312.7031.619. PMC 2350403. PMID 8595340..
- Berwick, Donald M. (October 1996). "Quality of health care. Part 5: Payment by capitation and the quality of care". The New England Journal of Medicine. 335 (16): 1227–31. doi:10.1056/NEJM199610173351611. PMID 8815948..
- Berwick DM (April 1998). "Developing and testing changes in delivery of care". Annals of Internal Medicine. 128 (8): 651–6. doi:10.7326/0003-4819-128-8-199804150-00009. PMID 9537939. S2CID 11015402..
- Leape LL, Berwick DM (March 2000). "Safe health care: are we up to it?". The BMJ. 320 (7237): 725–6. doi:10.1136/bmj.320.7237.725. PMC 1117747. PMID 10720335..
- Berwick DM (2002). "A user's manual for the IOM's 'Quality Chasm' report". Health Affairs. 21 (3): 80–90. doi:10.1377/hlthaff.21.3.80. PMID 12026006..
- Leape LL, Berwick DM, Bates DW (2002). "What practices will most improve safety? Evidence-based medicine meets patient safety". JAMA. 288 (4): 501–7. doi:10.1001/jama.288.4.501. PMID 12132984. S2CID 15759464..
- Berwick, D. M. (April 2003). "Disseminating innovations in health care". JAMA. 289 (15): 1969–75. doi:10.1001/jama.289.15.1969. PMID 12697800..
- Berwick DM, Jain SH. "The Basis for Quality Care in Prepaid Group Practice", in Toward a 21st Century Health System: The Contributions and Promise of Prepaid Group Practice. Alain C. Enthoven & Laura A. Tollen eds. San Francisco: Jossey-Bass, 2004.
- Leape, L. L.; Berwick, DM (May 2005). "Five years after To Err Is Human: what have we learned?". JAMA. 293 (19): 2384–90. doi:10.1001/jama.293.19.2384. PMID 15900009..
- Berwick, D. M.; Calkins, DR; McCannon, CJ; Hackbarth, AD (January 2006). "The 100,000 lives campaign: setting a goal and a deadline for improving health care quality". JAMA. 295 (3): 324–7. doi:10.1001/jama.295.3.324. PMID 16418469..
- Berwick, D. M. (March 2008). "The science of improvement". JAMA. 299 (10): 1182–4. doi:10.1001/jama.299.10.1182. PMID 18334694..
- Berwick, DM, Jain SH, and Porter ME. "Clinical Registries: The Opportunity For The Nation". Health Affairs Blogs, May 2011.

Political offices
| Preceded by Charlene Frizzera; Acting | Administrator of the Centers for Medicare and Medicaid Services; 2010–2011 | Succeeded by Marilyn Tavenner |
