= Marilyn Tavenner =

American politician

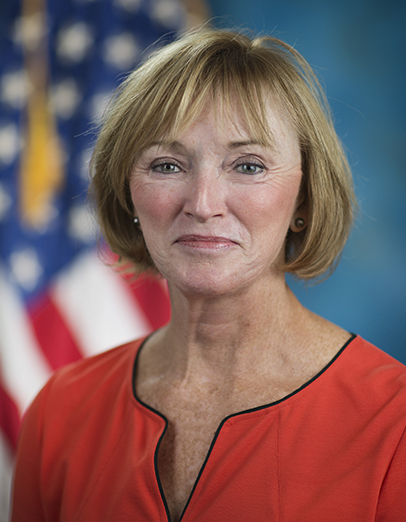

14th Administrator of the Centers for Medicare and Medicaid Services
- In office December 2, 2011 – March 18, 2015; Acting: December 2, 2011 – May 15, 2013
- President: Barack Obama
- Preceded by: Donald Berwick
- Succeeded by: Seema Verma

11th Virginia Secretary of Health and Human Resources
- In office January 14, 2006 – January 16, 2010
- Governor: Tim Kaine
- Preceded by: Jane Woods
- Succeeded by: Bill Hazel

Personal details
- Born: Marilyn Ann Barbour; May 31, 1951 (age 74) Martinsville, Virginia, U.S.
- Party: Democratic
- Spouse: Robert Tavenner
- Education: Virginia Commonwealth University (BSN, MHA)

Marilyn Barbour Tavenner (born May 31, 1951) is an American government official and health-care executive who served as the Administrator of the Centers for Medicare and Medicaid Services, an agency of the United States Department of Health and Human Services, from 2011 to 2015.

== Early life and education ==
She earned Bachelor of Science in nursing and Master of Health Administration degrees from Virginia Commonwealth University.

== Career ==
From 1981 to 2005, Tavenner was employed by HCA Healthcare, beginning as a nurse at the Richmond, Virginia-based Johnston-Willis Hospital, eventually becoming Chief Executive Officer of the hospital in 1993. In 2001, she became President of HCA's Central Atlantic Division, and was later appointed Group President of Outpatient Services, before resigning from HCA in 2005.

Tavenner became Acting Administrator following the resignation of Donald Berwick in December 2011, after serving as the agency's Principal Deputy Administrator. Prior to her original appointment to the Centers for Medicare and Medicaid Services, she served as Secretary of Health and Human Resources in the Cabinet of Virginia Governor Tim Kaine from 2006 to 2010.

Tavenner was confirmed as Administrator of the Centers for Medicare and Medicaid Services on May 15, 2013.

In office, Tavenner spearheaded the rollout of the Affordable Care Act website, HealthCare.gov, that allows people to enroll in health-care plans. The site faced a number of issues for users who were trying to enroll, and on October 29, 2013, Tavenner issued an apology. She said in her prepared testimony that, "The initial consumer experience of HealthCare.gov has not lived up to the expectations of the American people, and is not acceptable", adding that, "We are committed to fixing these problems as soon as possible".

In January 2015, Tavenner announced her resignation, and Andy Slavitt became the acting administrator after Tavenner's resignation. Slavitt started work at the agency in July 2014. He had been a top executive at Optum, a unit of UnitedHealth Group.

On July 15, 2015, Tavenner was unanimously elected as president and CEO of America's Health Insurance Plans by AHIP's Board of Directors.

Political offices
Preceded by Donald Berwick	14th Administrator of the Centers for Medicare and Medicaid Services; Acting: 2011–2013; 2011–2015	Succeeded by Seema Verma
