= Seema Verma =

American businesswoman (born 1970)

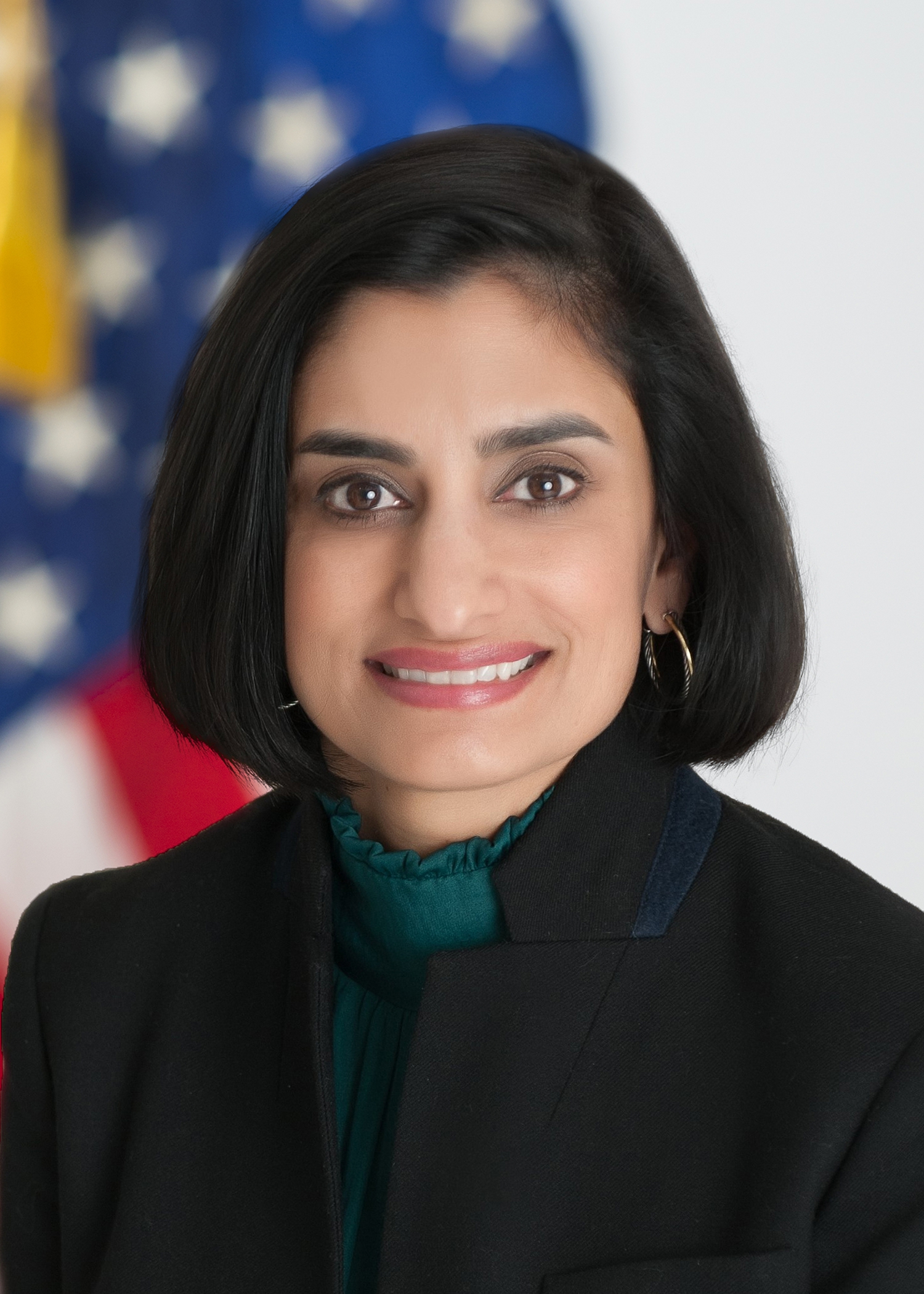

15th Administrator of the Centers for Medicare and Medicaid Services
- In office March 14, 2017 – January 20, 2021
- President: Donald Trump
- Preceded by: Marilyn Tavenner
- Succeeded by: Chiquita Brooks-LaSure

Personal details
- Born: September 26, 1970 (age 56) Portsmouth, Virginia, U.S.
- Party: Republican
- Education: University of Maryland, College Park (BS); Johns Hopkins University (MPH)

Seema Verma (born September 26, 1970) is an American healthcare executive who is currently a general manager and executive vice president at Oracle Corporation. She was administrator of the Centers for Medicare & Medicaid Services in the first Donald Trump administration from 2017 to 2021. During her tenure, she supported policies aimed at repealing elements of the Affordable Care Act and implementing changes to Medicaid. Her time in office drew scrutiny over her use of federal funds, leading to investigations regarding legal compliance.

== Early life and education ==
Born in Virginia, Verma was a first-generation Indian American. She and her family moved several times, living in small towns such as Joplin, Missouri, and larger cities such as the Washington D.C. area. She also lived in Taiwan for five years while growing up. In 1988, she graduated from Eleanor Roosevelt High School in Greenbelt, Maryland.

Verma received a bachelor's degree in life sciences from the University of Maryland, College Park, in 1993. She earned a Master of Public Health, with a concentration in health policy and management, from the Johns Hopkins School of Public Health in 1996.

== Career ==
=== Early career ===
Verma was vice president of the Health & Hospital Corporation of Marion County, and worked at the Association of State and Territorial Health Officials in Washington, D.C.

=== SVC, Inc. ===
Verma founded health policy consulting firm SVC, Inc. in June 2001. She was president and CEO of the company, which worked with private companies, state insurance agencies and public health agencies for the implementation of the Affordable Care Act. SVC also assisted Indiana, Iowa, Ohio, and Kentucky, as well as other states, in the design of Medicaid expansion programs under the ACA.

In 2006, Verma's team began working with Gov. Mitch Daniels on a Medicaid alternative, featuring health savings accounts that required participants to contribute monthly, even if only a few dollars. This proposal eventually became the Healthy Indiana Plan, which expanded coverage options to low-income individuals with employer-sponsored healthcare coverage. In 2016, Verma received the Sagamore of the Wabash, an honorary away in Indiana that "is a personal tribute usually given to those who have rendered a distinguished service to the state or to the governor".

In her work with Indiana, Ohio, and Kentucky, she developed Medicaid reform programs under the Section 1115 waiver process.

Verma sold SVC to Health Management Associates, based in Lansing, Michigan, after her confirmation as administrator of the Centers for Medicare and Medicaid Services.

=== Centers for Medicare and Medicaid Services ===
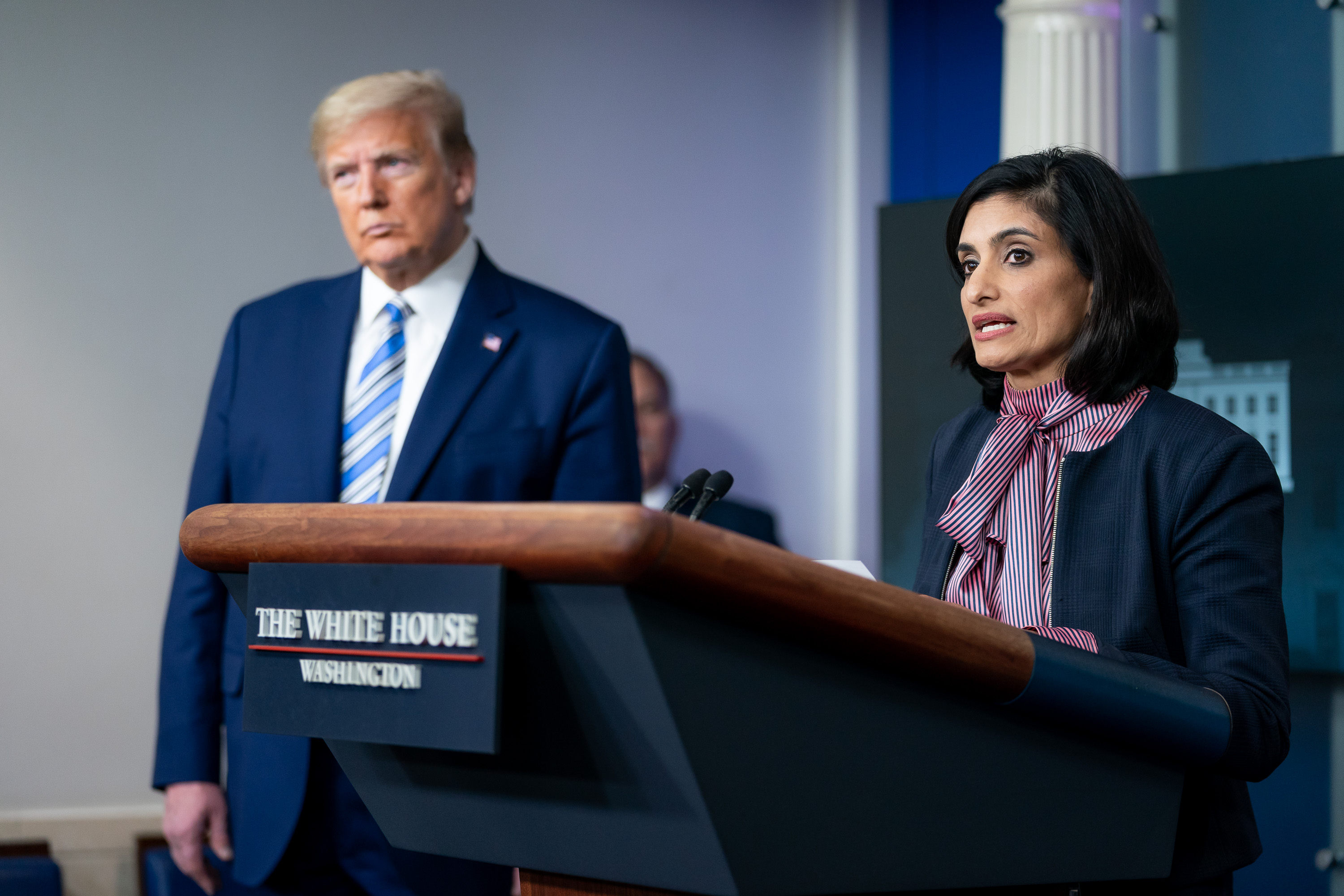
Verma speaks on the coronavirus pandemic from the White House press briefing room on April 19, 2020

On November 29, 2016, President-elect Donald Trump announced plans to nominate Verma to serve as administrator of the Centers for Medicare and Medicaid Services, the agency that oversees Medicare, Medicaid, and the insurance markets. On March 13, 2017, the United States Senate confirmed her nomination in a bipartisan vote.

=== Healthcare policy and the ACA ===
In November 2017, Verma outlined her plan for Medicaid. It included updates to the waiver process, encouraging work requirements for beneficiaries, and the creation of quality scorecards. One of her first actions was to send a letter to the nation's governors, urging them to impose insurance premiums for Medicaid, charge Medicaid recipients for emergency room visits, and encourage recipients to obtain employment or job training as a requirement for Medicaid coverage. Verma stated in the letter that she was concerned about the Affordable Care Act's expansion of Medicaid to non-disabled, working-age adults without dependent children, suggesting it may divert resources from more vulnerable populations. She was supportive of President Trump signing into law legislation that permitted states to withhold federal funds from facilities that provide abortions.

Verma was a vocal critic of the Affordable Care Act (ACA), and referred to it as a "failed government program" during a national conference in 2019, while arguing for a more "consistent model" across payers. She advocated for a state-led, decentralized approach to the ACA, and supported states implementing work requirements for able-bodied Medicaid recipients. In 2018, Verma oversaw a $26 million cut to the Affordable Care Act Navigator Program, a government initiative that assists consumers in enrolling in health insurance through the health insurance marketplace. On July 25, 2018, Verma gave a speech in San Francisco in which she criticized proposals for "Medicare for all". She stated that single-payer health care would destroy Medicare, which provides insurance for elderly people, and lead to "Medicare for None." Rather than a nationalized, single-payer system, Verma supported market-based Medicare policies, such as a change that would allow enrollees in Medicare's managed care plans to "fire" their insurers if they didn't like their plan.

=== Agency dynamics ===
During her tenure, Verma had a contentious relationship with Alex Azar, the HHS Secretary. The two reportedly clashed over which policies would replace Obamacare after Azar denied Verma's proposal before it ever reached the president's desk. In 2019, the Department of Health and Human Services brought in outside counsel to investigate allegations of sex discrimination, but found “no evidence”.

Verma reassigned her next Chief of Staff to Baltimore. Afterwards, the reporter of the Modern Healthcare article stated that he was told during a CMS press call that he wasn't allowed to take part in it. The president of the Association of Health Care Journalists condemned this action. An agency spokesman stated: “No reporters have been banned by CMS.”

=== Coronavirus task force ===
On March 2, 2020, the office of Vice President Mike Pence announced Verma's addition to the White House Coronavirus Task Force. As a part of the taskforce, Verma introduced temporary waivers and regulatory flexibilities for hospitals and healthcare providers. In June, Verma said she supported continued expanded access to telemedicine after the coronavirus pandemic receded.

In the weeks leading up to the 2020 election, she pushed Medicare career civil servant officials to finalize a plan to issue $200 prescription drug discount cards to Medicaid beneficiaries before the November 3 election, branded with Trump's name. The taxpayer-funded plan was estimated to cost $7.9 billion and draw from Medicare's trust fund.

=== End of tenure ===
Verma's time at CMS covered 2017 to 2021, which made her one of the longest tenured administrators. When reflecting back on the experience, including times of critique and difficulties, Verma said she had no regrets at accepting the position. She submitted her resignation a few days ahead of the swearing in of Joe Biden as President of the United States.

== Oracle ==
Verma was appointed as senior vice president and general manager of Oracle Life Sciences, Oracle's clinical business, in April 2023. In these roles, she oversaw Oracle's clinical applications, its clinical trial applications, its Electronic Health Records (EHR) system, and its AI and cloud computing efforts supporting clinical research and clinical care.

In January 2024, her role was expanded to executive vice president (EVP) of Oracle Health and Life Sciences. As EVP, Verma oversees initiatives like the U.S. Department of Veterans Affairs' Electronic Health Records Modernization program. She has advocated for greater interoperability in healthcare information systems, a focus she discussed at the 2025 Oracle Health and Life Sciences Summit, where she outlined efforts to integrate EHRs with administrative and operational systems. This included workforce management and supply chain platforms.

== Personal life ==
Born in Virginia, Verma moved several times across the United States with her family, and once lived in Taiwan for five years, before settling in the greater Indianapolis area. Verma and her family live in Carmel, Indiana.

== Reception ==
In 2014, the Indianapolis Star (Indy Star) published a piece raising ethics concerns regarding Verma's dual roles as both a health care consultant for the State of Indiana and as an employee of a Hewlett-Packard division that is among Indiana's largest Medicaid vendors. In a written statement, Verma said she did not play a role in HP’s contracts with the state, and that “SVC has disclosed to both HP and the state the relationship with the other to be transparent." No action was taken and SVC continued to serve both contracts.

On August 20, 2018, Verma filed a claim requesting that taxpayers reimburse her for jewelry and other items she alleged was stolen on a work-related trip to San Francisco, including a $5,900 Ivanka Trump-brand pendant. Although she requested $47,000, she ultimately received $2,852.40 in reimbursement.

In July 2020, the HHS Inspector General reported that Verma spent more than $5 million in taxpayer funds to do communications work, and to help raise her profile. The report, a result of a 15-month investigation, concluded that Verma violated federal contracting rules.

In September 2020, Democrats on four congressional committees concluded that she "may have violated federal law," leading Congress to request a formal legal opinion from the Government Accountability Office. The report from GAO, issued in 2023, concluded that CMS did not violate the purpose statute, publicity or propaganda prohibition, or publicity experts prohibition when it obligated appropriations for task orders for communication services.

In 2021, Verma said she lost her CMS-issued cell phone two days before President Biden's inauguration, resulting in the elimination of all of its stored records. Verma then failed to complete the standard form explaining how she lost her phone, the court records state. Verma was issued a new iPhone on January 18, which she returned nine days later. Records from that phone can not be accessed because the phone was locked and Verma said she had forgotten her passcode.

Political offices
Preceded by Andy Slavitt; Acting	Administrator of the Centers for Medicare and Medicaid Services; 2017–2021	Succeeded by Elizabeth Richter; Acting
