= Stephanie Carlton =

American healthcare policy advisor and government official

- Occupations: Healthcare policy advisor, government official
- Employer: Centers for Medicare & Medicaid Services
- Known for: Deputy Administrator and Chief of Staff of the Centers for Medicare & Medicaid Services

Stephanie Carlton is an American healthcare policy advisor and government official serving as the Deputy Administrator of the Centers for Medicare & Medicaid Services (CMS). She was previously the agency's Chief of Staff and worked as a healthcare consultant at McKinsey & Company. In 2025, Carlton co-authored an opinion article with CMS Administrator Mehmet Oz in The Washington Post addressing federal policy concerning healthcare and transgender youth. She also co-authored a related opinion article published by Fox News.
