= Matthew Bassett =

Healthcare executive and government official

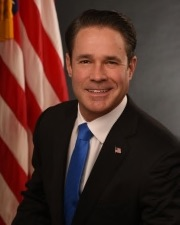

Assistant Secretary of Health and Human Services for Legislation
- In office February 5, 2018 – June 2019
- President: Donald Trump
- Preceded by: Jim R. Esquea
- Succeeded by: Sarah Arbes

Personal details
- Born: Matthew David Bassett Coral Springs, Florida
- Education: Baylor University; Trinity University

Matthew Bassett is an American healthcare executive and government official. President Donald Trump nominated him to serve as Assistant Secretary for Legislation in the United States Department of Health and Human Services. Bassett was previously a senior executive at health companies myNEXUS and Davita Inc. He held senior staff positions in the United States House of Representatives and served the Governor of Kentucky as chief of staff to Kentucky's Cabinet for Health and Family Services, where he worked to reform the state's Medicaid and insurance markets. Bassett serves on the board of directors for the Access Tennessee Health Insurance Pool.
