= Andy Slavitt =

American medical official (born 1966)

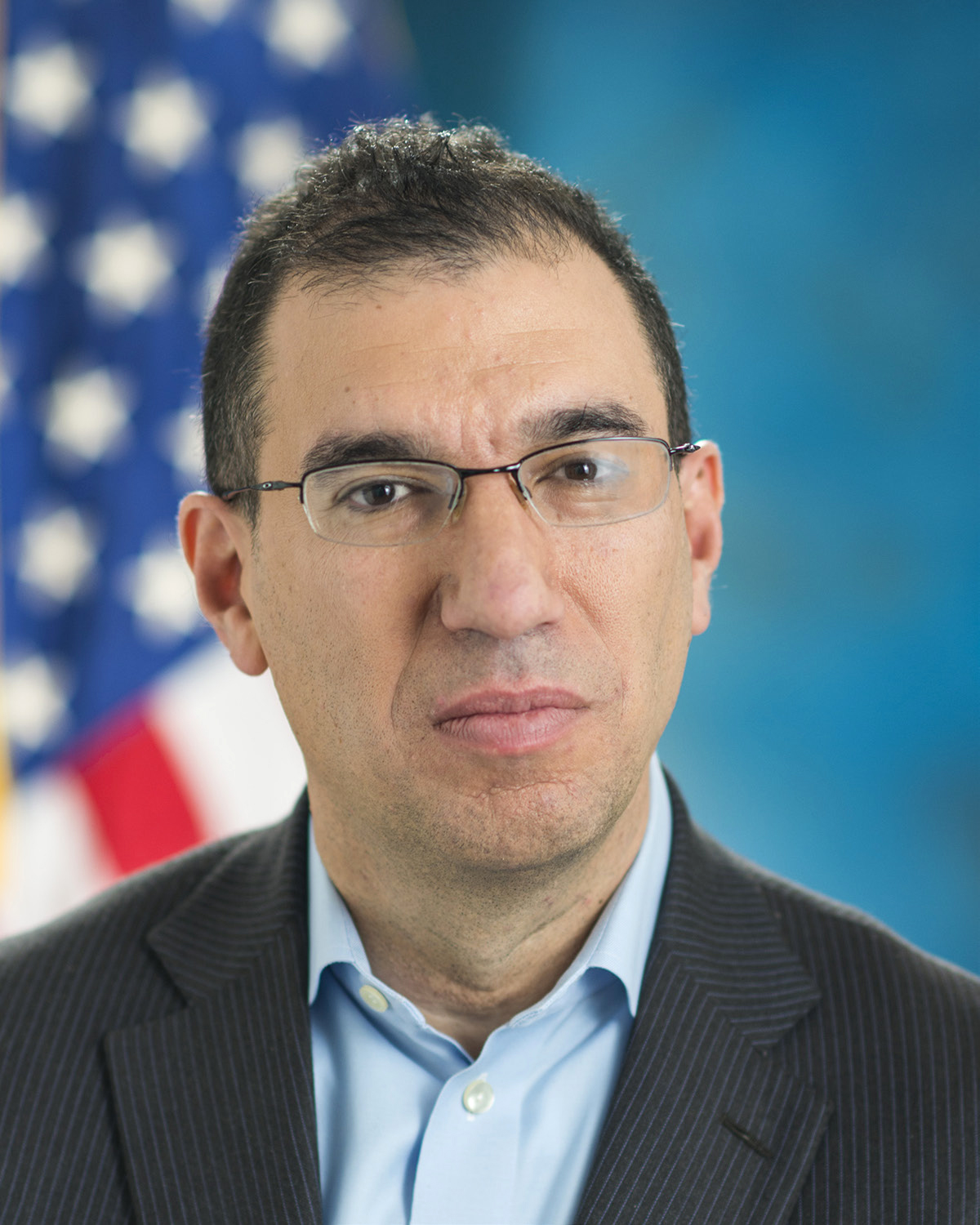
- Slavitt in 2015

White House Senior Advisor for the COVID-19 Response
- In office January 20, 2021 – June 9, 2021
- President: Joe Biden
- Preceded by: position established
- Succeeded by: position abolished

Administrator of the Centers for Medicare and Medicaid Services
- Acting
- In office March 18, 2015 – January 20, 2017
- President: Barack Obama
- Preceded by: Marilyn Tavenner
- Succeeded by: Seema Verma

Personal details
- Born: November 16, 1966 (age 60)
- Spouse: Lana Etherington (m. 1996)
- Children: 2
- Education: University of Pennsylvania (BS); Harvard University (MBA)

Andrew M. Slavitt (born 1966) is an American businessman and healthcare advisor who was the acting administrator of the Centers for Medicare and Medicaid Services from March 2015 to January 2017 and as a temporary Senior Advisor to the COVID-19 Response Coordinator in the Biden administration. A leader of the team that helped to repair the healthcare.gov website after its initial rollout, he was nominated by Barack Obama to run CMS in July 2015. In January 2021, Slavitt accepted a temporary role as Senior Pandemic Advisor to President Joe Biden’s COVID-19 pandemic response team. He stepped down from that role in June 2021.

== Early life and education ==
Slavitt is the son of Earl Benton Slavitt, a Chicago attorney. He is a graduate of both The College of Arts and Sciences and the Wharton School at the University of Pennsylvania in 1988. He earned an MBA from the Harvard Business School in 1993.

== Career ==
Slavitt's career was initially in investment banking at Goldman Sachs. After receiving his MBA, he joined McKinsey & Company as a consultant. In 1999, Slavitt founded the healthcare company HealthAllies after the death of his college roommate, Jeff Yurkofsky, from a malignant brain tumor. Slavitt later recounted that the financial strain of Yurkofsky's death led to Yurkofsky's widow and children moving into a spare room at his home. He was CEO of HealthAllies until 2003, when the company was acquired by UnitedHealth Group, whereafter he was CEO of OptumInsight and the group executive vice president for Optum, both subsidiaries of UnitedHealth Group.

In February 2008, Optum, then named Ingenix, was the center of an investigation by New York State Attorney General Andrew Cuomo "into a scheme by health insurers to defraud consumers by manipulating reimbursement rates." On January 13, 2009, Ingenix announced an agreement with the New York State attorney settling the probe into the independence of the health pricing database. Under the settlement, UnitedHealth Group and Ingenix would pay $50 million. On January 15, 2009, UnitedHealth Group announced a $350 million settlement of three class action lawsuits filed in federal court by the American Medical Association, UnitedHealth Group members, healthcare providers, and state medical societies for not paying out-of-network benefits.

=== Healthcare.gov ===
The Obama administration hired UnitedHealth Group's Optum unit, of which Slavitt was an EVP, to lead turnaround efforts for healthcare.gov after a series of technical issues reduced stability and service during the portal's 2013 launch. In November 2013, Slavitt appeared before Congress to address the healthcare.gov turnaround at a hearing of the United States House of Representatives Committee on Energy and Commerce.

A February 2014 issue of Time called Slavitt's team “Obama’s Trauma Team”. CMS administrators credited his leadership with allowing the Obama administration to reach a self-imposed goal of providing fully functional Healthcare.gov service by December 1, 2013. Centers for Medicare and Medicaid Services Administrator Marilyn Tavenner described Slavitt as a “key part of our leadership team to help millions of Americans get affordable health insurance in a whole new way.”

=== Centers for Medicare and Medicaid Services ===
==== Principal Deputy Administrator ====
Health and Human Services Secretary Sylvia Burwell announced Slavitt's appointment as Principal Deputy Administrator of the Centers for Medicare and Medicaid Services (CMS) on June 20, 2014.

==== Acting Administrator ====
Slavitt became Acting CMS Administrator on March 18, 2015. He was succeeded as Principal Deputy CMS Administrator by Patrick Conway. In April 2015, Slavitt told a Brookings Institution panel that his priorities would include increasing the quality and reach of medical services in rural and underserved urban areas. He also held roles on the Obama administration's Heroin Task Force and was a member of Vice President Joe Biden’s Cancer Moonshot task force. Slavitt remained charged with implementation of the Affordable Care Act ("Obamacare") within the Obama administration throughout his tenure at CMS, and regularly provided testimony before Congress on the administration's ACA implementation.

In July 2015, Obama formally nominated Slavitt to run CMS.

=== Affordable Care Act "Town Hall Challenge" ===
On January 23, 2017, Politico reported that Slavitt would focus his post-Obama administration efforts on defending the ACA from Congressional Republicans' efforts to repeal it.

Over the summer of 2017, Slavitt invited Congressional Republicans to hold public town halls explaining their ACA votes to constituents. At the time, only eight legislators had held public meetings about the ACA, and Slavitt challenged every Congressional Republican to meet with their constituents and explain their votes. After the limited Republican response, Slavitt organized the “Town Hall Challenge”. He held 16 town-hall-style events to discuss healthcare policy and the ACA before a total audience of over 35,000 people. In January 2018, The Nation magazine reported that Slavitt's town halls were galvanizing public opinion in support of the law, writing, "Slavitt traveled from district to district, often on his own dime, explaining to some 35,000 Americans how the ACA’s repeal would affect them. He took to social media to inform and energize hundreds of thousands more. He worked with any resistance group that reached out to him. And, in the end, he helped to rally the tsunami of opposition that would turn repeated attempts to kill the law into a massive debacle for the Republican Party."

In August 2017, Slavitt told The New York Times Magazine, “If you give me 15 minutes, I can create a common bond around a story of the health care system with almost any American.” His social media activism in support of the ACA has earned praise from former Obama administration officials for its effectiveness.

=== COVID-19 pandemic response ===
==== Early warnings about COVID-19 impact ====
Slavitt was an early public critic of President Donald J. Trump’s preparedness for a major novel COVID-19 pandemic. On February 25, 2020, when COVID-19 infections began to appear across the United States, Slavitt appeared as a guest on Hardball with Chris Matthews to question Trump administration claims that the Centers for Disease Control had adequately contained domestic spread of the virus. Slavitt praised CDC officials who contradicted official accounts of the federal government's early handling of COVID-19:

The truth is finally starting to come out today when the CDC officials are bravely speaking up. And we've got a competency and a credibility problem, which is going to make it very difficult to manage through this. And I think if people wonder, "is there a cost—is there a credibility cost to a president who doesn't always tell the truth?", it really comes into play now.

Two weeks later, on March 7, Slavitt published an open letter to American governors on Medium detailing a potential shortage of hospital beds and ventilators due to COVID-19's rapid spread.

==== #SaveLives campaign and bipartisan counselor ====
Despite being a former Obama administration official, Slavitt pursued a bipartisan approach to COVID-19 response efforts. In an April 20, 2020 interview with the Chicago Tribune, Slavitt recounted the challenges of pursuing a bipartisan approach during a period of heightened political polarization:

If any of us has an opportunity to help—Republican or Democrat, and I believe this virus spreads between parties—maybe it’s a chance to put partisanship behind us...It was reported in Politico I give advice to Jared Kushner and the White House, and I’m sure there are people who sit where I sit politically who are upset. I make no apology. We do what we can if it saves lives.

On March 16, Slavitt launched the #StayHome campaign, an online advocacy effort designed to provide resources for American families, healthcare workers, and state and local policymakers combating COVID-19. The campaign was supported by public affairs firm The Glover Park Group. This campaign predated broad lockdowns in New York City and Los Angeles by a week, and included guidance from a bipartisan roster of public health and political leaders, including former Senate Majority Leader Bill Frist, former Mitt Romney policy director Lanhee J. Chen, and former U.S. Surgeon General Vivek Murthy.

Slavitt contributed to the Trump administration's initial phased reopening plan, but criticized the White House for failing to follow its own recommendations. In a May 7 editorial published on Medium, he argued that plans to gradually reopen the American economy would increase COVID-19 infection rates if reopening was not paired with increased testing and contact tracing. Slavitt also criticized Trump's proposed decision to disband the White House Coronavirus Task Force while new infections were taking place.

==== Proposed COVID-19 contact tracing plan ====
On April 27, 2020, Slavitt, former Food and Drug Administration Commissioner Scott Gottlieb, and 14 other public healthcare officials and scientists launched an effort to secure $46.5 billion in congressional funding for a comprehensive contact tracing program designed to monitor and control community spread of COVID-19.

In a letter to House and Senate leaders first obtained by National Public Radio on April 27, Slavitt, Gottlieb and a bipartisan roster of public health experts wrote, "The existing public health system is currently capable of providing only a fraction of the contact tracing and voluntary self-isolation capacity required to meet the COVID-19 challenge".

Slavitt proposes spending $12 billion to “expand the contact tracing workforce by 180,000 people” and an additional $4.5 billion to modify vacant hotels for use as self-isolation facilities. A further $30 billion would be earmarked to provide income support to Americans required to self-isolate. His contact tracing plan received praise during an April 2020 interview with PBS NewsHour.

==== In The Bubble with Andy Slavitt ====
In April 2020, Slavitt partnered with Lemonade Media to launch In the Bubble with Andy Slavitt, a biweekly podcast aimed at deconstructing the COVID-19 pandemic through vital information, interviews, and a forward-looking message of hope:

What we needed was what I call "50% Winston Churchill, 50% Fred Rogers".

Slavitt, the show's host, was initially joined by his son, Zachary, who was co-host. The first episode premiered on April 1, 2020, with guest Mark Cuban. Later guests have included Alex Gibney, Chuck Schumer, Tina Fey, Bill Kristol, Mike Birbiglia, Pete Buttigieg, DeRay Mckesson, Gretchen Whitmer, Kumail Nanjiani, Judd Apatow, Larry Brilliant, Susan Rice, Rajiv Shah, Pete Souza, Kara Swisher, Bernie Sanders, Connie Schultz, Sherrod Brown, Steve Kerr, former Surgeon General Vivek Murthy, Moms Demand Action founder Shannon Watts, and international security expert Juliette Kayyem. All proceeds from listener donations go to COVID-19 relief efforts.

=== Biden administration ===
In January 2021, it was announced that Slavitt would be named a temporary senior advisory position on COVID-19 in the Biden administration. On January 16, Slavitt formally joined Biden's coronavirus response team with the title of Senior Advisor. At the time, he told reporters he expected to be in the role for four months.

In his public-facing role, Slavitt regularly briefed reporters on the administration's public health efforts, including addressing public concerns about vaccine availability in a January 27 NPR interview and announcing a $230 million agreement to increase production of over-the-counter, at-home coronavirus tests in a February 1 press conference. He also promoted the administration's nationwide vaccination efforts in his public appearances, telling CBS This Morning on April 26, "If [the unvaccinated] look at the over 130 million Americans that have been vaccinated, how much safer they are...and compare that to the incredibly modest risk of taking a vaccine", most Americans would be enthusiastic to get vaccinated.

Slavitt received media attention for his nonpartisan approach, in particular for comments in March 2021 praising the Trump administration's vaccine development effort Operation Warp Speed. "We’re grateful for the work that came before us", he told Fox News. "I would absolutely tip my hat...the Trump administration made sure we got, in record time, a vaccine up and out. That’s a great thing."

At a May 2021 White House briefing, Slavitt revealed that his teenage son Zach continued to suffer serious lingering medical effects from an earlier bout of COVID-19. He cited symptoms including tachycardia, shortness of breath, and flu-like symptoms while urging Americans with families to vaccinate their children aged 12 to 15 as soon as possible.

Slavitt stepped down from his role on June 9, 2021. Upon news of his departure, prominent public health officials including Director of the U.S. National Institute of Allergy and Infectious Disease Anthony Fauci praised Slavitt as a "class act" and said "we will miss you greatly". Former Food and Drug Administration Commissioner Scott Gottlieb commended Slavitt for "answering the call to service at a critical moment in public health".

=== Preventable published in 2021 ===
External videos
- After Words interview with Slavitt on Preventable, June 26, 2021, C-SPAN

On September 8, 2020, Slavitt announced that St. Martin's Press would publish a book of his about the pandemic. Preventable: The Inside Story of How Leadership Failures, Politics, and Selfishness Doomed the U.S. Coronavirus Response debuted on June 15, 2021. According to the publisher, the book offers the "definitive inside account of the United States’ failed response to the coronavirus pandemic", with Slavitt detailing "what he saw and how much could have been prevented".

==== Praise and criticism ====
Preventable drew widespread praise from reviewers and public officials. U.S. Secretary of Transportation Pete Buttigieg said that the book "comes at a crucial moment as [Slavitt] explains, in accessible and engaging terms, how we got here and what must happen next". In a review for The Washington Post, Yasmeen Abutaleb called Slavitt "the outsider’s insider" while praising him for “bring[ing] you into the room as fateful decisions are made" and doing the "important work of addressing the uncomfortable realities that brought America to this place". Publishers Weekly praised the book's "informative and often enraging" account of the pandemic's early days.

Slavitt has been a subject of an antisemitic conspiracy theory claiming that he and other Jewish people are part of a cabal responsible for COVID and a "COVID agenda".

== Personal life ==
In 1996, Slavitt married Lana Etherington. They have two sons, Caleb and Zachary. He is Jewish.

== Works ==
- Slavitt, Andy (June 15, 2021). Preventable: The Inside Story of How Leadership Failures, Politics, and Selfishness Doomed the U.S. Coronavirus Response. St. Martin's Press. ISBN 978-1250770165.

Political offices
Preceded by Marilyn Tavenner	Administrator of the Centers for Medicare and Medicaid Services; Acting; 2015–2017	Succeeded by Seema Verma
