= Chiquita Brooks-LaSure =

American healthcare policy official

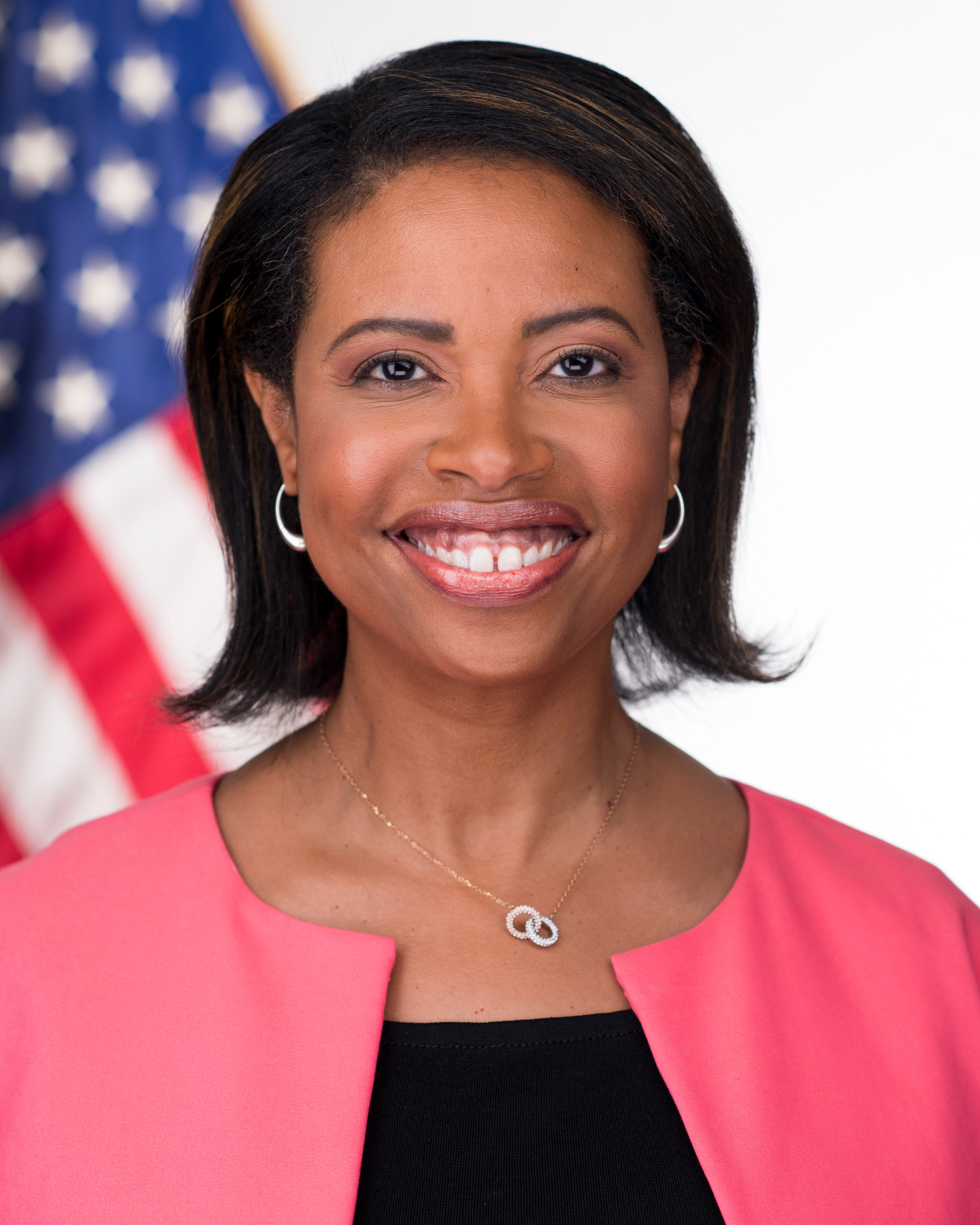
- Brooks-LaSure in 2021

16th Administrator of the Centers for Medicare and Medicaid Services
- In office May 27, 2021 – January 20, 2025
- President: Joe Biden
- Deputy: Jonathan Blum
- Preceded by: Seema Verma
- Succeeded by: Jeff Wu as acting director Mehmet Oz

Personal details
- Party: Democratic
- Spouse: Michael Brooks-LaSure
- Education: Princeton University (BA); Georgetown University (MPP)

Chiquita W. Brooks-LaSure is an American healthcare policy official who served as the administrator for the Centers for Medicare and Medicaid Services in the Biden administration from 2021 to 2025.

== Early life and education ==
Brooks-LaSure is a native of Willingboro Township, New Jersey and graduated from Willingboro High School in 1992. She earned her Bachelor of Arts from Princeton University in 1996 and a Master of Public Policy from the McCourt School of Public Policy of Georgetown University in 1999.

== Early career ==
She began her career as a program examiner and lead Medicaid analyst in the Office of Management and Budget (OMB). In that role, she also analyzed aspects of Medicare spending. She also worked as a staffer for Democratic members of the United States House Committee on Ways and Means before joining the Center for Consumer Information and Insurance Oversight, where she was tasked with managing policy related to the Affordable Care Act.

After the end of the Obama administration, Brooks-LaSure became the managing director of the Health Division of national law firm Manatt, Phelps & Phillips. She also served on the Virginia Health Benefit Exchange Advisory Committee.

== Honors and recognition ==
Brooks-LaSure was included in the Time 2024 list of influential people in health. She was elected a Member of the National Academy of Medicine in 2024.

== Administrator of the Centers for Medicare and Medicaid Services ==
On February 19, 2021, President Joe Biden nominated Brooks-LaSure to be the next administrator of the Centers for Medicare and Medicaid Services (CMS). The United States Senate Committee on Finance held hearings on her nomination on April 15, 2021.

On April 22, 2021, the committee deadlocked on her nomination in a party-line vote, which resulted in an additional discharge vote being needed for her nomination to appear before the full Senate for a confirmation vote.

On May 12, 2021, her nomination was discharged from the committee by a vote of 51–48. On May 25, 2021, Brooks-LaSure was confirmed by the Senate by a vote of 55–44. On May 27, 2021, she was sworn in by Secretary Xavier Becerra.

== CMS vs. FDA Alzheimer Controversy ==
On April 7, 2022, CMS restricted anti-amyloid Alzheimer immunotherapies, approved by the Food and Drug Administration, to “coverage with evidence development.” CMS never before required registry studies for FDA-approved drug coverage and the decision resulted in no coverage for the class of medications. The restriction meant that over 2,000 patients with Alzheimer's per day progressed from mild to more severe disease, thus outside appropriate use. On July 6, 2023 (455 days later and 910,000 progressed patients), with the FDA approval of a second anti-amyloid therapy, CMS covered a drug in this class with a registry requirement.

Government offices
| Preceded by Seema Verma | Administrator of the Centers for Medicare and Medicaid Services; 2021–2025 | Succeeded by Jeff Wu; Acting |
