= Centers for Medicare & Medicaid Services =

United States federal agency

Agency overview
- Formed: March 1977; 49 years ago
- Preceding agency: Health Care Financing Administration (1977–2001)
- Headquarters: Woodlawn, Baltimore County, Maryland, U.S.
- Employees: 6,000
- Agency executives: Mehmet Oz, Administrator; Stephanie Carlton, Deputy Administrator
- Parent agency: Department of Health and Human Services
- Website: www.cms.gov

The Centers for Medicare & Medicaid Services (CMS) is a federal agency within the United States Department of Health and Human Services (HHS) that administers the Medicare program and works in partnership with state governments to administer Medicaid, the Children's Health Insurance Program (CHIP), and health insurance portability standards. In addition to these programs, CMS has other responsibilities, including the administrative simplification standards from the Health Insurance Portability and Accountability Act of 1996 (HIPAA), quality standards in long-term care facilities (more commonly referred to as nursing homes) through its survey and certification process, clinical laboratory quality standards under the Clinical Laboratory Improvement Amendments, and oversight of HealthCare.gov. CMS was previously known as the Health Care Financing Administration (HCFA) until 2001.

CMS actively inspects and reports on every nursing home in the United States. This includes maintaining the 5-Star Quality Rating System.

== Organization ==
The agency is organized around six centers to support its key functions. It carries out its responsibilities from its national headquarters located in Woodlawn, Maryland, and its 10 regional offices. Numerous other offices throughout the agency support these centers.

The centers:

- Center for Medicare (CM)
- Center for Medicaid and CHIP Services (CMCS)
- Center for Medicare and Medicaid Innovation (CMMI, a.k.a. the CMS Innovation Center)
- Center for Consumer Information and Insurance Oversight (CCIIO)
- Center for Program Integrity (CPI)
- Center for Clinical Standards and Quality (CCSQ)

The regions:

Region	Office	Jurisdiction	Refs.
I	Boston, Massachusetts	Connecticut, Massachusetts, Maine, New Hampshire, Rhode Island, and Vermont	
II	New York, New York	New York, New Jersey, U.S. Virgin Islands, and Puerto Rico	
III	Philadelphia, Pennsylvania	Delaware, Maryland, Pennsylvania, Virginia, West Virginia, and the District of Columbia	
IV	Atlanta, Georgia	Alabama, Florida, Georgia, Kentucky, Mississippi, North Carolina, South Carolina, and Tennessee	
V	Chicago, Illinois	Illinois, Indiana, Michigan, Minnesota, Ohio, and Wisconsin	
VI	Dallas, Texas	Arkansas, Louisiana, New Mexico, Oklahoma, and Texas	
VII	Kansas City, Missouri	Iowa, Kansas, Missouri, and Nebraska	
VIII	Denver, Colorado	Colorado, Montana, North Dakota, South Dakota, Utah, and Wyoming	
IX	San Francisco, California	Arizona, California, Hawaii, Nevada, American Samoa, Guam, and the Northern Mariana Islands	
X	Seattle, Washington	Alaska, Idaho, Oregon, and Washington	

=== Workforce ===
In 2022, CMS employed over 6,000 people, of whom about 4,000 were assigned to its headquarters in Woodlawn, Maryland. The remaining employees were assigned to the Hubert H. Humphrey Building in Washington, D.C., or the 10 regional offices listed below, or in various field offices located throughout the United States.

The head of CMS is the administrator of the Centers for Medicare & Medicaid Services. The position is appointed by the president and confirmed by the Senate.

== History ==
Originally, the name "Medicare" in the United States referred to a program providing medical care for families of people serving in the military as part of the Dependents' Medical Care Act, which was passed in 1956. President Dwight D. Eisenhower held the first White House Conference on Aging in January 1961, in which creating a health care program for social security beneficiaries was proposed.

President Lyndon B. Johnson signed the Social Security Amendments on July 30, 1965, establishing both Medicare and Medicaid. Arthur E. Hess, a deputy commissioner of the Social Security Administration, was named as first director of the Bureau of Health Insurance in 1965, placing him as the first executive in charge of the Medicare program. At the time, the program provided health insurance to 19 million Americans. The Social Security Administration (SSA) became responsible for the administration of Medicare and the Social and Rehabilitation Service (SRS) became responsible for the administration of Medicaid. Both agencies were organized under what was then known as the Department of Health, Education, and Welfare (HEW), in 1965. Since then, HEW, has been reorganized as the Department of Health and Human Services (HHS) in 1980. This consequently brought Medicare and Medicaid under the jurisdiction of the HHS.

In March 1977, the Health Care Financing Administration (HCFA) was established under HEW. HCFA became responsible for the coordination of Medicare and Medicaid. The responsibility for enrolling beneficiaries into Medicare and processing premium payments remained with SSA.

HCFA was renamed the Centers for Medicare & Medicaid Services on July 1, 2001. This was later codified in law by the Medicare Prescription Drug, Improvement, and Modernization Act of 2003.

In 2010, the Center for Medicare and Medicaid Innovation was created by the Affordable Care Act.

In 2013, a report by the inspector general found that CMS had paid $23 million in benefits to deceased beneficiaries in 2011.

In April 2014, CMS released raw claims data from 2012 that gave a look into what types of doctors billed Medicare the most.

In January 2018, CMS released guidelines for states to use to require Medicaid beneficiaries to continue receiving coverage. These guidelines came in response to then-President Trump's announcement that he would allow states to impose work requirements in Medicaid. In October, CMS reported a data breach of 75,000 people's personal data due to a hack.

In February 2018, CMS removed a notice from its website that informed insurance companies they were not allowed to charge physicians a fee when the companies paid the doctors for their work. This has resulted in doctors being charged up to a 5% fee on their compensation, adding up to billions of dollars annually.

In January 2021, CMS passed a rule that would cover "breakthrough technology" for four years after they received FDA approval. In September 2021, CMS submitted a proposal to repeal the rule based on safety concerns.

On May 27, 2021, Chiquita Brooks-LaSure was sworn in as CMS administrator, the first black woman to serve in the role.

On September 19, 2023, the Subcommittee on Health held a hearing titled "Examining Policies to Improve Seniors’ Access to Innovative Drugs, Medical Devices, and Technology." Dora Hughes, the acting director of the Center for Clinical Standards and Quality at the U.S. Centers for Medicare and Medicaid Services (CMS), defended the proposed Transitional Coverage for Emerging Technologies (TCET) pathway, which aims to restrict coverage for breakthrough medical devices to five reviews a year. Some lawmakers and medtech trade groups called for expanding the pathway to include diagnostics. Various other legislative proposals were discussed during the hearing, including bills related to Medicare coverage, drug pricing, and transparency in healthcare.

On January 1, 2026, CMS launched the Wasteful and Inappropriate Service Reduction (WISeR) Model through the Center for Medicare and Medicaid Innovation, introducing prior authorization for selected traditional Medicare Part B services in Arizona, New Jersey, Ohio, Oklahoma, Texas, and Washington. The model uses artificial intelligence to support medical necessity reviews, although all adverse determinations are made by licensed clinicians rather than automated systems. The model drew opposition from the American Hospital Association, which requested a six-month implementation delay, and prompted legislation introduced in late 2025 to repeal it.

== List of administrators ==
No.	Image	Name	Took office	Left office	Refs.	President served under
1		Arthur E. Hess	1965	1967		Lyndon B. Johnson
2		Thomas M. Tierney	1967	1978		Lyndon B. Johnson; Richard Nixon; Gerald Ford; Jimmy Carter
3		Robert Derzon	June 1977	November 1978		Jimmy Carter
4		Leonard Schaeffer	November 1978	June 1980		Jimmy Carter
5		Howard N. Newman	July 1980	January 1981		Jimmy Carter
6		Carolyne Davis	March 1981	August 1985		Ronald Reagan
7		William L. Roper	May 1986	February 1989		Ronald Reagan; George H. W. Bush
8		Gail Wilensky	February 1990	March 1992		George H. W. Bush
9		Bruce Vladeck	May 1993	September 1997		Bill Clinton
10		Nancy-Ann DeParle	November 1997	September 29, 2000		Bill Clinton
11		Thomas A. Scully	May 2001	December 3, 2003		George W. Bush
12		Mark McClellan	March 25, 2004	October 14, 2006		George W. Bush
Acting		Kerry Weems	October 14, 2006	January 20, 2009		George W. Bush
Acting		Charlene Frizzer	January 20, 2009	July 7, 2010		Barack Obama
13		Donald Berwick	July 7, 2010	December 2, 2011		Barack Obama
14		Marilyn Tavenner	December 2, 2011	March 18, 2015		Barack Obama
Acting		Andy Slavitt	March 18, 2015	January 20, 2017		Barack Obama
15		Seema Verma	March 14, 2017	January 20, 2021		Donald Trump
Acting		Elizabeth Richter	January 20, 2021	May 27, 2021		Joe Biden
16		Chiquita Brooks-LaSure	May 27, 2021	January 20, 2025		Joe Biden
Acting		Jeff Wu	January 20, 2025	January 31, 2025		Donald Trump
Acting		Stephanie Carlton	January 31, 2025	April 8, 2025		Donald Trump
17		Mehmet Oz	April 8, 2025	Incumbent		Donald Trump

== See also ==
- Medicare Drug Price Negotiation Program
- Zone Program Integrity Contractor
