= Elinore McCance-Katz =

American physician, academic, and government official

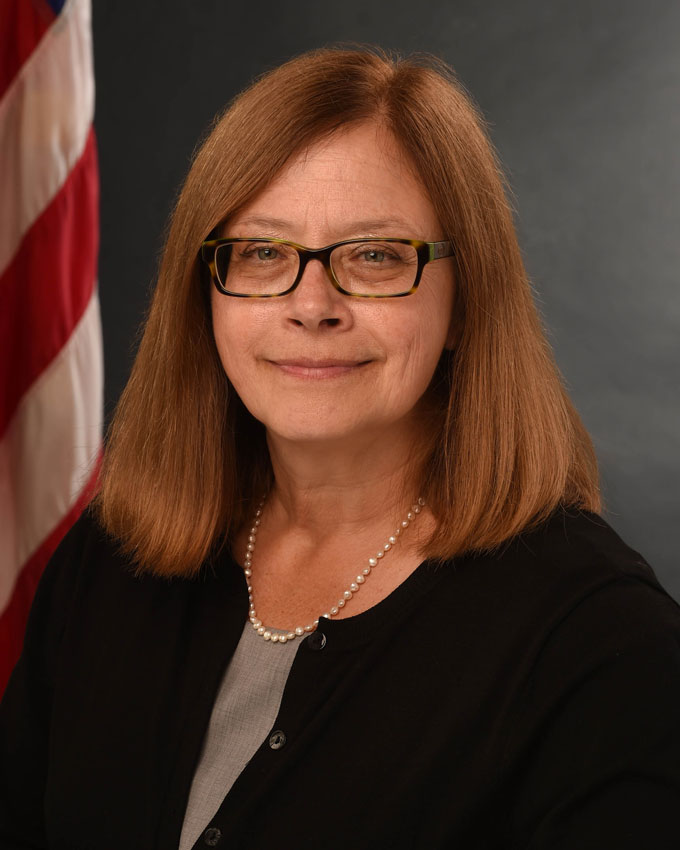

Assistant Secretary of Health and Human Services for Mental Health and Substance Use
- In office September 11, 2017 – January 7, 2021
- President: Donald Trump

Chief Medical Officer at Substance Abuse and Mental Health Services Administration
- In office 2013–2015
- President: Barack Obama

Personal details
- Education: Eastern Connecticut State University (BA); Yale University (MPhil, PhD); University of Connecticut (MD)

Elinore F. McCance-Katz is an American physician, academic, and government official who served as Assistant Secretary of Health and Human Services for Mental Health and Substance Use from 2017 to 2021. Prior to assuming her current role, she was the chief medical officer for the Rhode Island Department of Behavioral Healthcare, Developmental Disabilities, and Hospitals and a professor at the Alpert Medical School at Brown University. Her nomination was supported by the American Psychiatric Association, which released a statement saying "Dr. McCance-Katz has a wealth of experience in academic and public sector settings in addressing mental health and substance use disorders."

McCance-Katz resigned in the wake of the 2021 storming of the United States Capitol, on January 7, 2021.

After her 2021 resignation, McCance-Katz was hired into a senior civil service job by the Drug Enforcement Administration.

== Education ==
McCance-Katz earned a B.A. in biology from Eastern Connecticut State University in 1978. She went on to attend Yale University, where she received an MPhil and Ph.D. She attended medical school at the University of Connecticut School of Medicine, where she earned her M.D. in 1987. She completed her residency in psychiatry at Hartford Hospital in Connecticut.

== Career ==
McCance-Katz was on the faculty of Yale University from 1991 to 1998 and later taught at the University of Texas, the Albert Einstein College of Medicine, Virginia Commonwealth University, and the University of California San Francisco. McCance-Katz was medical director for the California Department of Alcohol and Drug Programs before serving as the first chief medical officer for the Substance Abuse and Mental Health Services Administration, a position which she held from 2013 to 2015. She is a Distinguished Fellow of the American Academy of Addiction Psychiatry. McCance-Katz and her husband hold a patent for a method used to prevent urine specimen substitution in substance use screening. She has conducted substantial research into addiction, specifically opioid addiction.

== Political controversies ==
McCance-Katz's work in the Trump administration was marked by several controversial statements. For example, in 2018, McCance-Katz spoke out against fentanyl test strips for people who use drugs. As she wrote in an HHS-sponsored blog, “The entire approach is based on the premise that a drug user poised to use a drug is making rational choices, is weighing pros and cons, and is thinking completely logically about his or her drug use. Based on my clinical experience, I know this could not be further from the truth.” At the same time, however, a study in the International Journal of Drug Policy came to the opposite conclusion. As pointed out in a 2017 New York Times article, the treatment of drug addiction has long been marked by a split between “a medical model of psychiatry, which emphasizes drug and hospital treatment and which Dr. McCance-Katz has promoted, and the so-called psychosocial, which puts more emphasis on community care and support from family and peers.”

In September 2020, during the height of the Covid epidemic and just prior to the 2020 presidential election, McCance-Katz spoke on a podcast posted on the official HHS website: “What is this nonsense that somehow it’s unsafe to return to school?... There was no agreement to this, to this nonstop restriction and quarantining and isolation and taking away anything that makes people happy.... You can’t go to a movie, you can’t go to a football game.... We shut down the entire country before the virus, in my opinion, had a chance to get around the entire country. … We used a sledgehammer when I think we needed a scalpel.” As she asserted, “I just wish that the media would get honest about its coverage of Covid.... lost in all of this response to Covid and nonstop 24/7 horrors of Covid and if you can't find something to talk about, it appears to me they make things up. It just does.”
