= Robert Derzon =

American government official

Robert Alan Derzon (December 30, 1930 – June 17, 2009) was an American health care professional who served as the first director of the Health Care Financing Administration (HCFA), the arm of the US federal government responsible for administering Medicare and Medicaid.

== Early life and education ==
Derzon was born in Milwaukee, Wisconsin. He received his undergraduate education at Dartmouth College, graduating in 1953. He was awarded a master's degree from Dartmouth's Amos Tuck School of Business Administration in 1955, and earned a Master of Public Health in 1956 from the University of Minnesota.

== Professional career ==
Derzon served as associate director of New York University Medical Center from 1960 to 1966. Derzon was appointed as first deputy hospital commissioner in the New York City Department of Hospitals by Mayor of New York City John Lindsay, serving under lawyer and hospital administrator Joseph Vincent Terenzio, the first non-physician to serve as Hospitals Commissioner. Derzon served as the department's acting commissioner in 1970 after Terenzio's resignation. He testified to a legislative committee of New York State in 1969, stating that hospitals in New York City were "on the brink of fiscal disaster" due to reductions in Medicaid funding and calling the system of paying for hospital and medical care "a disaster" in which the majority of people statewide could not get affordable and accessible health care.

Derzon was named as administrator of the University of California, San Francisco Medical Center in 1970, serving in the position until 1977.

President of the United States Jimmy Carter appointed Derzon to serve as the first head of the Health Care Financing Administration (HCFA, later called the CMS), an agency created in March 1977 with the responsibility for overseeing both Medicare, which provides health insurance for those over age 65, and Medicaid, which provides health insurance for the poor. The two programs had both been established in 1965, but had been operated independently until that point. Derzon's task was to address the soaring costs of hospital care by reducing abuse and fraud in the two programs, implementing efforts to reduce costs that were controversial.

As part of a series of recommendations to United States Secretary of Health, Education, and Welfare Joseph A. Califano, Jr. sent in June 1977, Derzon supported the nationwide implementation of living will laws that had been enacted in California, suggesting that Federal aid be withheld to states that did not pass such laws. Derzon estimated that living will laws, which would allow doctors to end life support in cases where recovery is deemed unlikely, could cut $1 billion by 1978 in costs related to the 20% of annual Medicare expenses spent caring for patients in their last year of life. The memorandum also raised concerns about the growth in the number of physicians, estimating that the 85,000 additional doctors added by 1980 would generate $5 billion in revenue while increasing costs for hospital care, suggesting that cuts in the number of new doctors might be necessary and might well be supported by the American Medical Association. Derzon's memo advocated for Medicaid funding of abortions for poor women, citing $1,000 in annual savings in welfare expenditures on each unwanted child as well as $100 in reduced Medicaid expenses.

Secretary Califano fired Derzon from his post heading the HCFA in September 1978, citing Derzon's failure to progress quickly enough with the restructuring of Medicare and Medicaid. Derzon was willing to stand up to Califano's proposals and tell him what wouldn't work, a stance that Califano did not like and that led to what were described as "fiery clashes" between the two. Leonard D. Schaeffer was named as Derzon's replacement.

== Personal ==
A resident of Mill Valley, California, Derzon died of swine flu at age 78 on June 17, 2009, while visiting a friend in Orangeville, Ontario. He is survived by one daughter and two sons and nine grandchildren. His wife had died in 2002 after 46 years of marriage.
