= List of Cornell University alumni (natural sciences) =

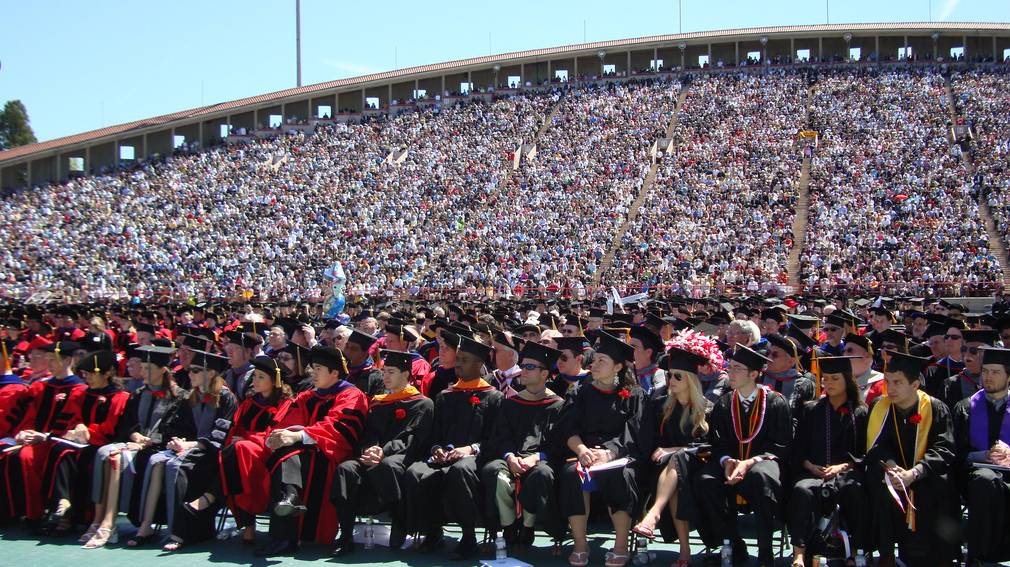
The 2008 graduation ceremony at Schoellkopf Field on the campus of Cornell University

This list of Cornell University alumni includes notable graduates, non-graduate former students, and current students of Cornell University, an Ivy League university located in Ithaca, New York, in the field of natural sciences and related subjects.

For other disciplines, see: List of Cornell University alumni.

== Alumni ==
=== Mathematics, statistics and operations research ===
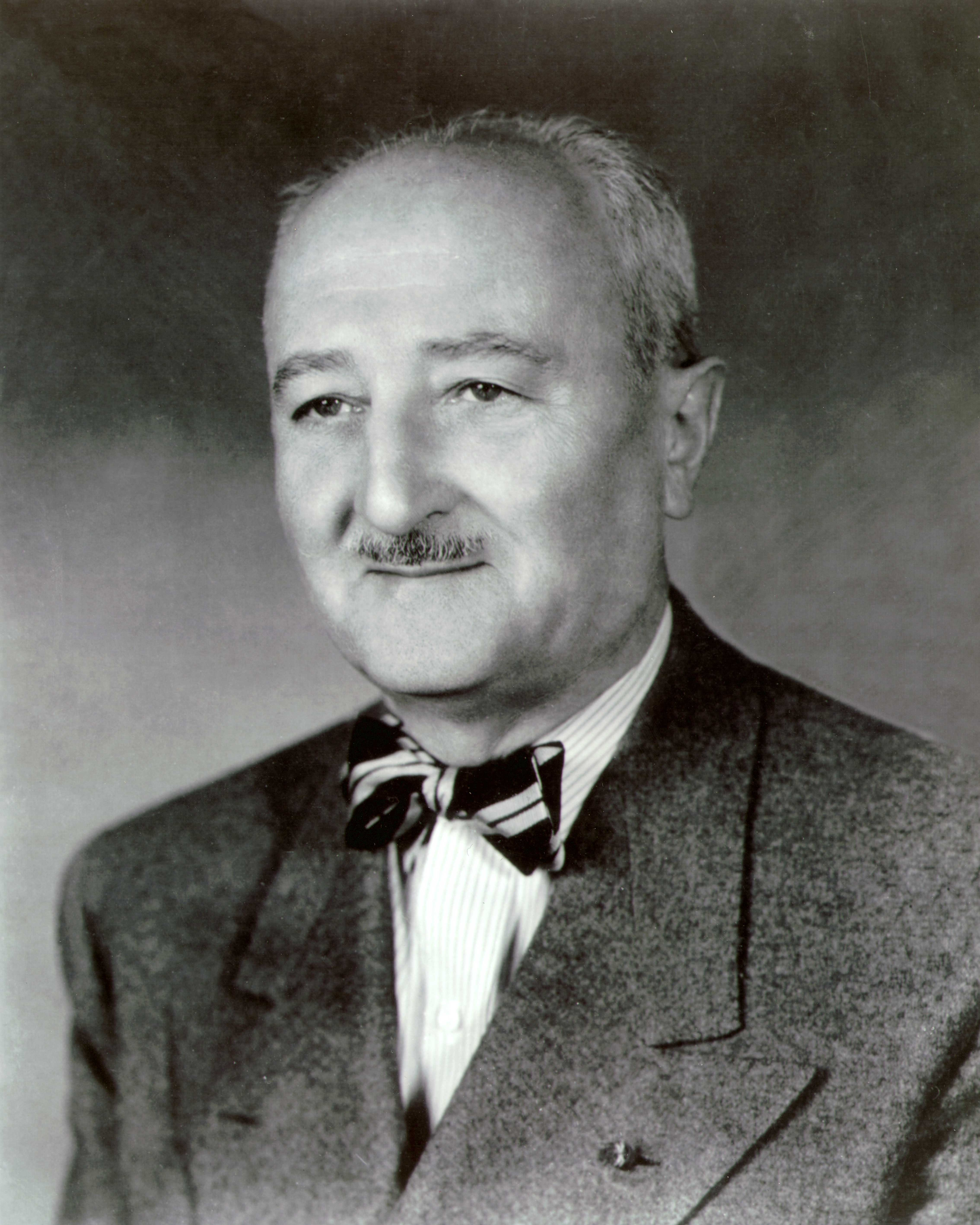
William F. Friedman

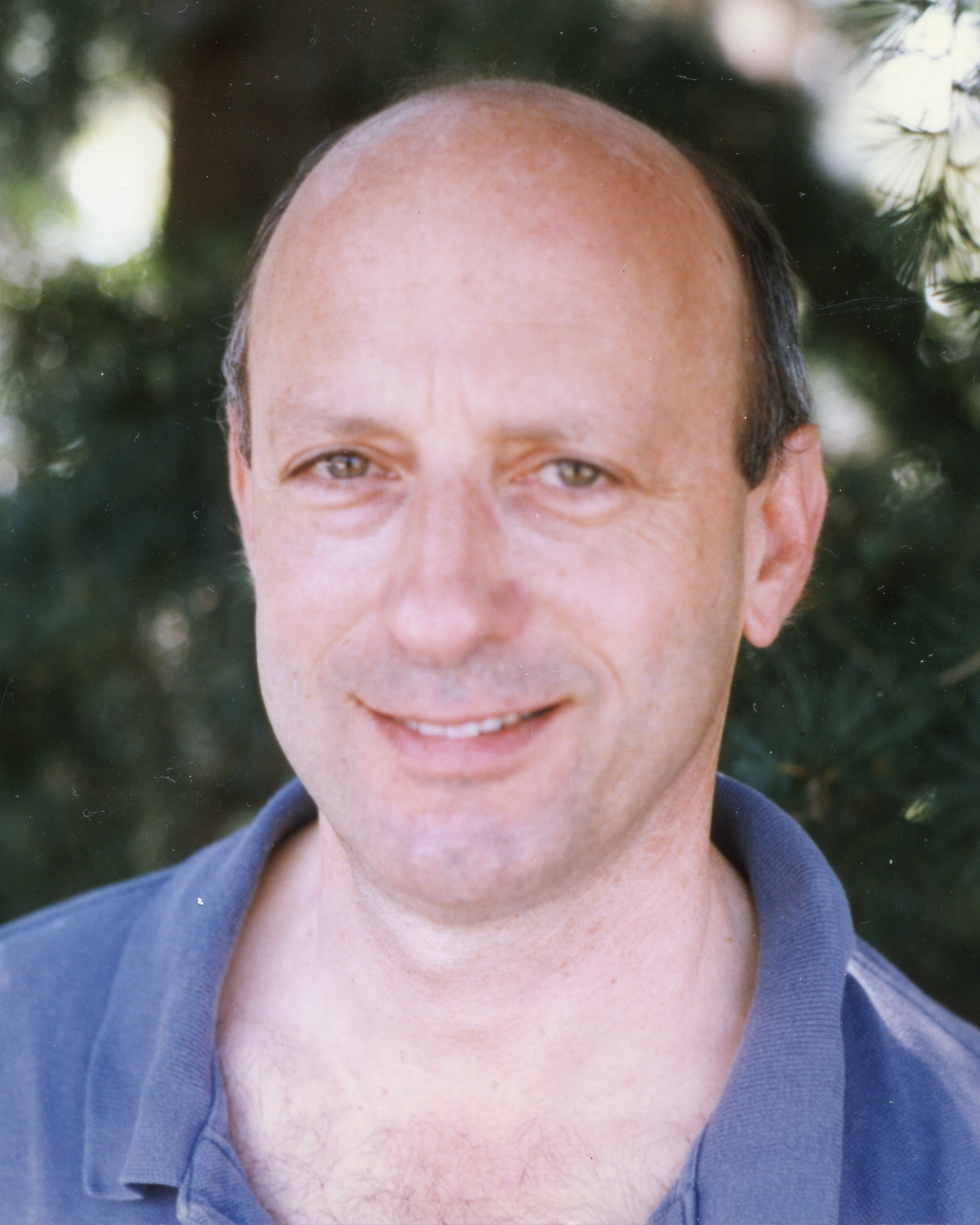
Stephen Gelbart

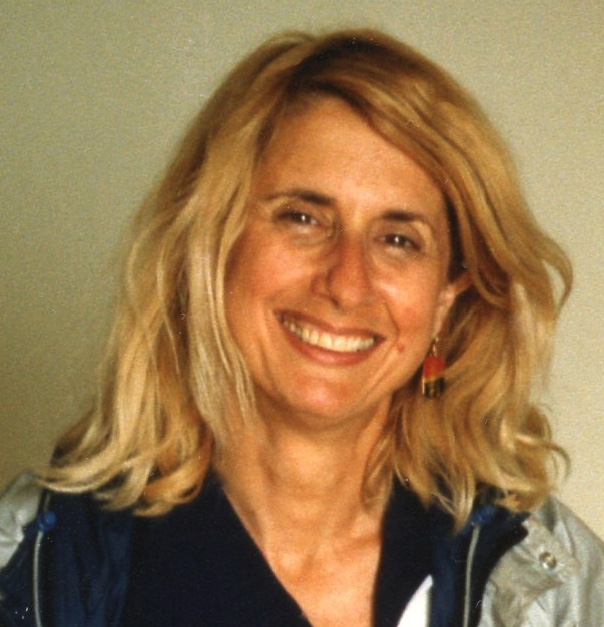
Grace Wahba

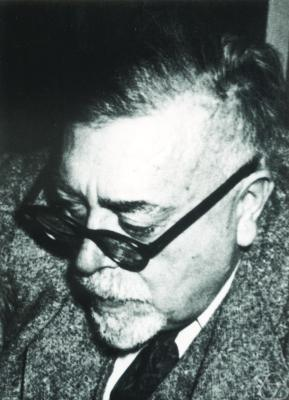
Norbert Wiener

- John B. Bell (M.S. 1977, Ph.D. 1979) – mathematician and the head of the Center for Computational Sciences and Engineering at the Lawrence Berkeley National Laboratory; recipient of the Sidney Fernbach Award (2005) and SIAM/ACM prize (2003), member of the National Academy of Sciences (2012) and fellow of SIAM (2009)
- James O. Berger (Ph.D. 1974) – statistician, professor of statistics at Duke University and director of the Statistical and Applied Mathematical Sciences Institute since 2002; fellow of the American Statistical Association and member of the National Academy of Sciences (2002); recipient of the Guggenheim Fellowship, the COPSS Presidents' Award (1985) and the R. A. Fisher Lectureship
- Robert E. Bixby (Ph.D. 1972) – Noah Harding Professor Emeritus of Computational and Applied Mathematics at Rice University; member of the National Academy of Engineering (1997)
- Maury D. Bramson (Ph.D. 1977 mathematics) – mathematician at University of Minnesota; member of the National Academy of Sciences (2017)
- Lawrence D. Brown (Ph.D. 1964; professor) – statistician, Miers Busch Professor of Statistics at the Wharton School of the University of Pennsylvania; member of National Academy of Sciences (1990) and the American Academy of Arts and Sciences; president of Institute of Mathematical Statistics (1992–1993)
- T. Tony Cai (Ph.D. 1996) – statistician; Dorothy Silberberg Professor at the Wharton School of the University of Pennsylvania; fellow of Institute of Mathematical Statistics (2006); recipient of COPSS Presidents' Award (2008)
- George F. Carrier (M.A. 1939, Ph.D. 1944) – mathematician, known for the modeling of fluid mechanics, Combustion, and Tsunamis, T. Jefferson Coolidge Professor of Applied Mathematics Emeritus at Harvard University, recipient of the National Medal of Science (1990), Otto Laporte Award (1976), Theodore von Karman Medal (1977), Timoshenko Medal (1978), Fluid Dynamics Prize (APS) (1984); member of the National Academy of Sciences (1967) and of the National Academy of Engineering (1974)
- Lauren M. Childs (M.S. 2007, Ph.D. 2010) – mathematician, expert on modeling disease spread
- Chia-Kun Chu (M.M.E. 1950) – applied mathematician, Fu Foundation Professor Emeritus of Applied Mathematics at Columbia University
- Julian Cole (B.S. engineering) – applied mathematician who was on faculty at Caltech, UCLA and RPI and served as department chair at UCLA; member of the National Academy of Sciences (1976) and of the National Academy of Engineering (1976); fellow of the American Academy of Arts and Sciences and of the American Physical Society
- Gérard Cornuéjols (Ph.D. 1978) – IBM University Professor of Operations Research at the Carnegie Mellon University and former editor-in-chief of Mathematics of Operations Research; recipient of Frederick W. Lanchester Prize (1977), the Fulkerson Prize (2000), the George B. Dantzig Prize (2009) and the John von Neumann Theory Prize (2011), member of the National Academy of Engineering (2016)
- Elbert Frank Cox (Ph.D. 1925 mathematics) – first black person in the world to receive a Ph.D. in mathematics; professor and department head at Howard University
- Brenda L. Dietrich (Ph.D. 1986) – member of the National Academy of Engineering (2014); IBM Fellow and fellow of the Institute for Operations Research and the Management Sciences (INFORMS)
- Benson Farb (B.A.) – mathematician at the University of Chicago, fellow of the American Mathematical Society (2012)
- William F. Friedman (B.S. 1914 genetics) – cryptologist, member of the Military Intelligence Hall of Fame
- Stephen Gelbart (B.A. 1967, professor) – American-Israeli mathematician; Nicki and J. Ira Harris Professorship at the Weizmann Institute of Science, president of the Israel Mathematical Union (1994–1996), fellow of the American Mathematical Society (2013)
- Robert Ghrist (M.A. 1994, Ph.D. 1995) – mathematician known for his work on topological methods in applied mathematics; the Andrea Mitchell Penn Integrating Knowledge Professor at the University of Pennsylvania (2008–)
- Donald Goldfarb (B.Ch.E. 1963) – Alexander and Hermine Avanessians Professor of Industrial Engineering and Operations Research at Columbia University (1982–); John von Neumann Theory Prize recipient (2017)
- Roger Horn (B.A. 1963) – co-developed the Bateman-Horn conjecture and wrote the standard-issue Matrix Analysis textbook with Charles Royal Johnson
- Alston Scott Householder (M.A. 1927) – mathematician and inventor of the Householder transformation and of Householder's method; president of the Society for Industrial and Applied Mathematics (SIAM) and of the Association for Computing Machinery (ACM)
- Iain M. Johnstone (Ph.D. 1981) – statistician, Stanford University Statistics Professor and president of the Institute of Mathematical Statistics, recipient of the Guy Medal (silver 2010, bronze 1995) and COPSS Presidents' Award (1995), member of the American Academy of Arts and Sciences and the National Academy of Sciences (2005)
- Harry Kesten (Ph.D. 1958) – mathematician best known for his work in probability, most notably on random walks and percolation theory; recipient of the Brouwer Medal (1981), the George Pólya Prize (1994) and the Steele Prize (2001), member of the National Academy of Sciences (1983) and of the Royal Netherlands Academy of Arts and Sciences and fellow of the American Mathematical Society
- Nancy Kopell (A.B. 1960) – studies dynamics of the nervous system; MacArthur Fellow (1990), Guggenheim Fellowship (1984); member of the National Academy of Sciences (1996) and fellow of the American Academy of Arts and Sciences
- Jon Lee (B.A. 1981, Ph.D. 1986) – mathematician and operations researcher, the G. Lawton and Louise G. Johnson Professor of Engineering at the University of Michigan
- Lee Lorch (B.A. 1935) – mathematician, contributed to fields of summability theory and Fourier analysis; early civil rights activist
- William L. Maxwell (B.M.E. 1957, Ph.D. 1961) – Andrew Schultz Jr. Professor Emeritus of Industrial Engineering at Cornell University; member of the National Academy of Engineering (1998) and fellow of the Institute for Operations Research and the Management Sciences (2002)
- Colm Mulcahy (Ph.D. 1985) – mathematician, columnist and book author; serves on the Advisory Council of the Museum of Mathematics in New York City; vice-president of Gathering 4 Gardner
- Henry Louis Rietz (Ph.D. 1902) – mathematician, actuarial scientist, and statistician who served as the president of the Institute of Mathematical Statistics and of the Mathematical Association of America
- Gerald Sacks (Ph.D. 1961, assistant and associate professor 1962–67) – mathematical logician; holds a joint appointment at Harvard University as a professor of Mathematical Logic and the Massachusetts Institute of Technology as a professor emeritus; known for his contributions in recursion theory
- Neil Sloane (Ph.D. 1967) – mathematician; creator and maintainer of the On-Line Encyclopedia of Integer Sequences; AT&T Fellow (1998), IEEE Fellow, American Mathematical Society Fellow; member of the National Academy of Engineering; recipient of Lester R. Ford Award (1978), the Chauvenet Prize (1979), the IEEE Richard W. Hamming Medal (2005), the Mathematical Association of America's David P. Robbins award (2008)
- Anna Lavinia Van Benschoten (B.S. 1894, PhD 1908) – mathematician and professor at Wells College
- Robert J. Vanderbei (Ph.D. 1981 applied mathematics) – mathematician and Professor of Operations Research and Financial Engineering at Princeton University; fellow of the American Mathematical Society (2013)
- Cornelia Strong (B.A. 1903) – mathematician, astronomer, and professor at the Woman's College of the University of North Carolina
- Samuel S. Wagstaff, Jr. (Ph.D. 1970) – mathematician and computer scientist known for the Wagstaff prime; professor of computer science and mathematics at Purdue University
- Grace Wahba (B.A. 1956) – statistician at the University of Wisconsin–Madison; member of the National Academy of Sciences (2000), fellow of the American Academy of Arts and Sciences, the American Association for the Advancement of Science, the American Statistical Association, and the Institute of Mathematical Statistics
- Ward Whitt (Ph.D. 1969 operations research) – Wai T. Chang Professor of IEOR at Columbia University; was on the faculty of Stanford University and Yale University; member of the National Academy of Engineering, recipient of John von Neumann Theory Prize (2001) and Frederick W. Lanchester Prize (2003)
- Norbert Wiener (graduate study 1910–1911, transferred) – mathematician; founder of the study of cybernetics; recipient of Bôcher Memorial Prize (1933) and National Medal of Science (1963)
- John Wesley Young (A.M. 1901, Ph.D. 1904) – professor, head (1911–1919) and chair (1923–1925) of the Mathematics Department at Dartmouth College, president of the Mathematical Association of America (1929–1930); known for axioms of projective geometry and the Veblen–Young theorem

=== Physics ===
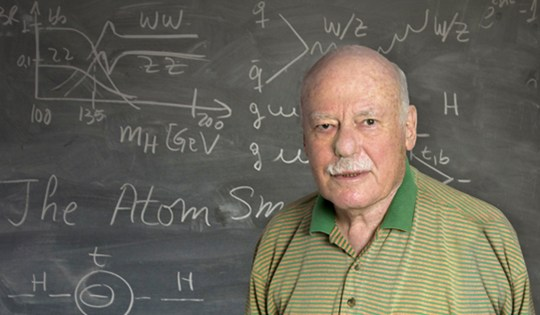
Harry Lipkin

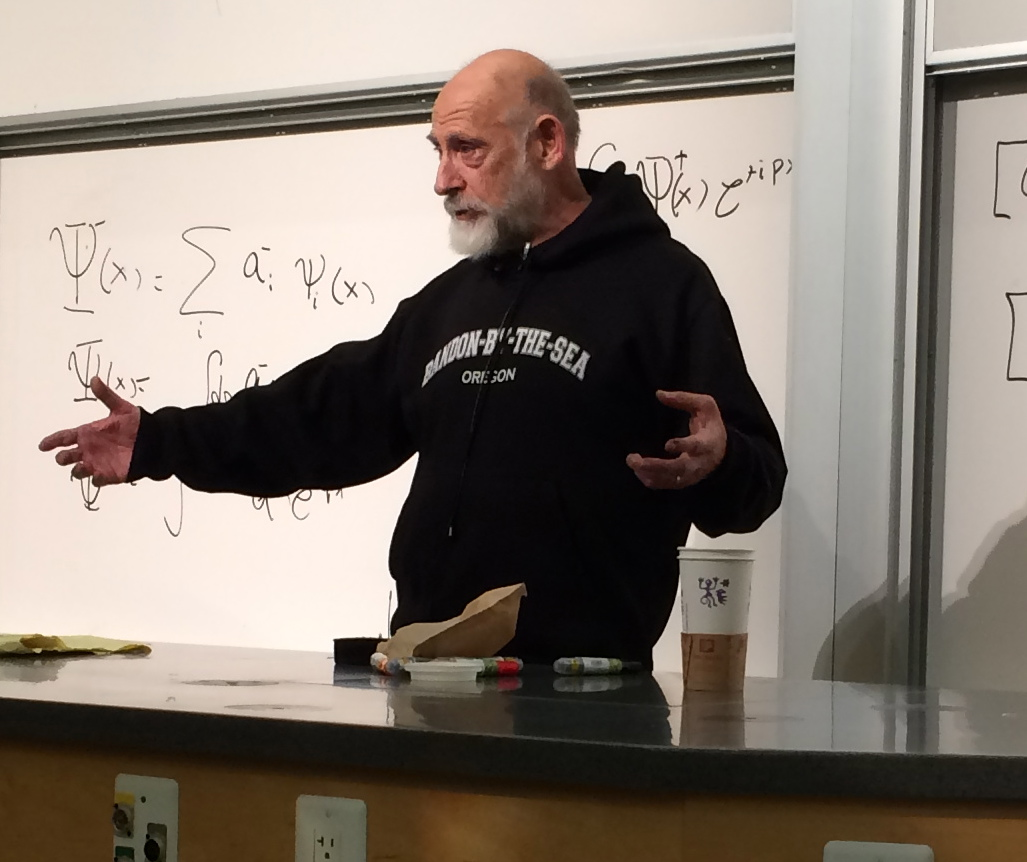
Leonard Susskind

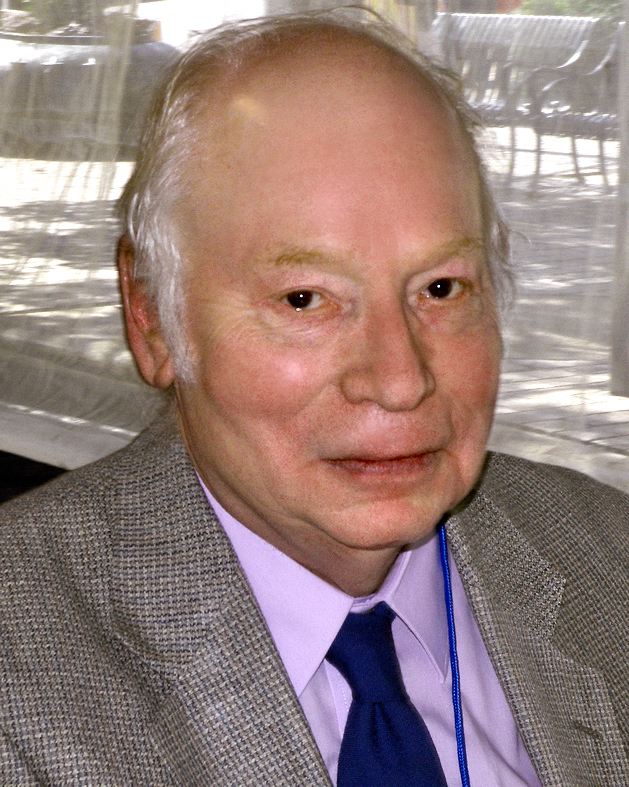
Steven Weinberg

- Richard L. Abrams (B.Eng., Ph.D. applied physics) – chief scientist of Hughes Research Laboratories; president of The Optical Society (1990)
- Andreas J. Albrecht (B.A. 1979) – distinguished professor and chair of the Physics Department at the University of California, Davis; fellow of the American Physical Society, of the Institute of Physics (UK), and of the American Association for the Advancement of Science
- Thomas Appelquist (Ph.D. 1968) – theoretical particle physicist at Yale University; recipient of the Sakurai Prize (1997), fellow of American Academy of Arts and Sciences and of the American Physical Society
- David Awschalom (Ph.D. 1982) – condensed matter experimental physicist known for his work in spintronics in semiconductors; Liew Family Professor in Molecular Engineering at the University of Chicago; member of the National Academy of Sciences (2007) and the National Academy of Engineering; fellow of the American Academy of Arts and Sciences; recipient of Oliver E. Buckley Condensed Matter Prize (2005) and Agilent Europhysics Prize by the European Physical Society (2005)
- William A. Bardeen (A.B. 1962) – theoretical physicist at Fermi National Accelerator Laboratory; recipient of the Sakurai Prize (1996), fellow of the American Physical Society (1984) and of the American Academy of Arts and Sciences (1998), member of the National Academy of Sciences (1999)
- Samuel Jackson Barnett (Ph.D. 1898) – physicist, known for Barnett effect in electromagnetism; professor of physics and department chairman at University of California at Los Angeles; repeated nominee of the Nobel Prize in Physics; fellow of the American Academy of Arts and Sciences
- Gordon Baym (B.A. 1956) – professor emeritus at University of Illinois at Urbana–Champaign; fellow of the American Academy of Arts and Sciences and member of the National Academy of Sciences (1982), recipient of the Hans A. Bethe Prize (2002) and Lars Onsager Prize (2008)
- Malcolm Beasley (B.E.P. 1962, Ph.D. 1968) – physicist and president of the American Physical Society (2014); fellow of the American Academy of Arts and Sciences and member of the National Academy of Sciences (1993); dean of the Stanford University School of Humanities and Sciences (1998–2001)
- Carl M. Bender (B.A. 1964) – Wilfred R. and Ann Lee Konneker Distinguished Professor of Physics at Washington University in St. Louis; fellow of the American Physical Society
- Allen Boozer (Ph.D. 1970) – theoretical plasma physicist at the Department of Applied Physics and Applied Mathematics, Columbia University; recipient of the Hannes Alfvén Prize (2010) and fellow of the American Physical Society (1982)
- Kenneth Bowles (Ph.D. 1955) – Jicamarca Radio Observatory, UCSD Pascal
- Gilles Brassard (Ph.D. 1979 computer science) – Wolf Prize in Physics recipient (2018), known for Quantum cryptography, Quantum teleportation, Quantum entanglement, Quantum pseudo-telepathy
- Peter A. Carruthers (Ph.D. 1961; professor) – physicist, leader of the theoretical division of Los Alamos National Laboratory (1973 – 1980), professor of physics and department chairman at the University of Arizona; co-founder of Santa Fe Institute
- David Ceperley (Ph.D. 1976 physics) – theoretical physicist at the University of Illinois Urbana-Champaign; member of the National Academy of Sciences (2006), fellow of the American Physical Society (1992) and of the American Academy of Arts and Sciences (1999)
- Moses H. W. Chan (M.S. 1969, Ph.D. 1974) – Evan Pugh Professor at Pennsylvania State University; recipient of the Fritz London Memorial prize (1996), member of the National Academy of Sciences (2000) and fellow of the American Academy of Arts and Sciences (2004)
- Susan Coppersmith (M.S. 1981, Ph.D. 1983 physics) – Robert E. Fassnacht and Vilas Professor of Physics at the University of Wisconsin–Madison and professor of physics at the University of Chicago; member of the National Academy of Sciences (2009), fellow of the American Academy of Arts and Sciences (2006) and of the American Association for the Advancement of Science (1999)
- Predrag Cvitanović (Ph.D. 1973) – nonlinear dynamics theoretical physicist; fellow of the American Physical Society and recipient of the Alexander von Humboldt Prize (2009)
- Mandar Madhukar Deshmukh (Ph.D. 2002) – Indian physicist specialising in nanoscale and mesoscopic physics; received the India's highest science and technology award, Shanti Swarup Bhatnagar Prize for Science and Technology, in 2015
- Gerald J. Dolan (Ph.D. 1973) – solid state physicist who received the Oliver E. Buckley Condensed Matter Prize in 2000
- Mildred Dresselhaus (postdoc) – applied physicist; Institute professor and professor of physics and electrical engineering (emerita) at the Massachusetts Institute of Technology; recipient of National Medal of Science (1990), Enrico Fermi Award (2012), Kavli Prize in Nanoscience (2012), Presidential Medal of Freedom (2014), IEEE Medal of Honor (2015), Oliver E. Buckley Condensed Matter Prize (2008); member of the National Academy of Sciences (1985) and the National Academy of Engineering (1974)
- Freeman Dyson (Commonwealth Fellow 1947–1948) – professor emeritus at the Institute for Advanced Study; recipient of the Harvey Prize (1977), Wolf Prize in Physics (1981), Templeton Prize (2000); member of the National Academy of Sciences (1964)
- Helen T. Edwards (B.S. 1957, M.S., Ph.D. 1966 physics) – leading scientist for the design and construction of the Tevatron at the Fermi National Accelerator Laboratory; member of the National Academy of Engineering; recipient of the USPAS Prize for Achievement in Accelerator Physics and Technology (1985), E. O. Lawrence Award (1986), MacArthur Foundation Fellowship (1988), the National Medal of Technology and Innovation (1989)
- Daniel S. Fisher (B.A. 1975 mathematics and physics) – applied physicist at Stanford University; member of the National Academy of Sciences (2015)
- Matthew P. A. Fisher (B.S. 1981 engineering physics) – theoretical condensed matter physicist at the University of California, Santa Barbara; recipient of the Alan T. Waterman Award (1995) and Oliver E. Buckley Condensed Matter Prize (2015); fellow of the American Academy of Arts and Sciences (2003) and member of the National Academy of Sciences (2012)
- Roswell Clifton Gibbs (B.A. 1906, M.A. 1908, Ph.D. 1910, chairman of the Department of Physics 1934–1946) – president of the Optical Society of America (1937–1938) and fellow of the American Physical Society
- Ursula Gibson (M.S. 1978, Ph.D. 1982) – professor of physics at the Norwegian University of Science and Technology, president of The Optical Society (2019)
- Paul Ginsparg (Ph.D. 1981 physics) – professor of physics and computing & information science at Cornell University, known for the development of the arXiv e-print archive; fellow of the American Physical Society, MacArthur Fellow (2002)
- Laura Greene (M.S. 1980, Ph.D. 1984) – experimental condensed matter physicist; president of the American Physical Society (2017), member of the National Academy of Sciences (2006) and fellow of the American Academy of Arts and Sciences (1997), the American Association for the Advancement of Science (1996) and the American Physical Society (1993)
- Kenneth Greisen (Ph.D. 1942; professor emeritus of physics) – pioneer in the study of cosmic rays; Manhattan Project participant; first chair of High Energy Astrophysics Division of the American Astronomical Society; member of the National Academy of Sciences (1974)
- Marshall G. Holloway (Ph.D. 1938 physics) – member of the National Academy of Engineering (1967) for design, construction, and testing of nuclear weapons
- David A. Huse (Ph.D. 1983) – Cyrus Fogg Brackett Professor of Physics at Princeton University; member of the National Academy of Sciences (2017)
- Roman Jackiw (Ph.D. 1966) – professor at the MIT Center for Theoretical Physics, known for Adler–Bell–Jackiw anomaly and Jackiw–Teitelboim gravity; member of the National Academy of Sciences (1998), Guggenheim Fellow and fellow of the American Physical Society; Dirac Medallist
- Deane B. Judd (Ph.D. 1926) – physicist in the fields of colorimetry, color discrimination, color order, and color vision; president of The Optical Society (1953–1955)
- Harry Kroger (Ph.D. 1962) – physicist and electrical engineer
- James A. Krumhansl (Ph.D. 1943; professor) – physicist; president of the American Physical Society (1989–1990)
- Harry J. Lipkin (1942) – Israeli theoretical physicist specializing in nuclear physics and elementary particle physics; received the Wigner Medal in 2002
- Andrea Liu (Ph.D. 1989) – Hepburn Professor of Physics at the University of Pennsylvania; fellow of the American Association for the Advancement of Science and member of the National Academy of Sciences (2016)
- Franklin Ware Mann (B.S. 1878) – pioneering ballistics researcher and inventor of the Mann rest adopted by the National Institute of Standards and Technology and Aberdeen Proving Ground
- Robert E. Marshak (Ph.D. 1939) – physicist, known for his contributions in weak interaction; he and his student George Sudarshan were the first to propose the V-A theory of Weak Interactions; served as chairperson of Physics Department at University of Rochester, president of City College of New York, and the university distinguished professor at Virginia Tech; president of American Physical Society (1982–1983); fellow of the American Academy of Arts and Sciences and member of the National Academy of Sciences (1958); recipient of three Guggenheim Fellowships, the Humboldt Award of the Alexander von Humboldt Foundation, and J. Robert Oppenheimer Memorial Prize
- Boyce McDaniel (Ph.D. 1943, professor 1946–1985) – Manhattan Project physicist and synchrotron designer; member of the National Academy of Sciences
- Ernest Merritt (B.S. mechanical engineering, M.A. Physics; professor, dean of Graduate School 1909–1914, chair of the Physics Department 1919–1935) – physicist, co-founder (1893) and co-editor (1893–1913) of the journal Physical Review, first secretary, then president (1914–1916) of the American Physical Society, member of the National Academy of Sciences (1914)
- David Robert Nelson (A.B., 1972, M.S., 1974, Ph.D., 1975, physics) – Arthur K. Solomon Professor of Biophysics and Professor of Physics and Applied Physics at Harvard University; MacArthur Fellow (1984), recipient of Guggenheim Fellowship and Oliver E. Buckley Condensed Matter Prize (2004), member of the National Academy of Sciences, fellow of the American Physical Society, the American Association for the Advancement of Science, and the American Academy of Arts and Sciences
- Edward Leamington Nichols (B.S. 1875, professor) – founder of the Physical Review, member of the National Academy of Sciences (1901), president of the American Association for the Advancement of Science (1907) and the American Physical Society (1907–08)
- Perley G. Nutting (Ph.D. 1903) – founder of Optical Society of America and its first president (1916–1917)
- Gerard K. O'Neill (Ph.D. 1954) – physicist and space activist
- John Perdew (M.S., Ph.D.) – theoretical condensed matter physicist; member of the National Academy of Sciences (2011)
- Michael Peskin (Ph.D. 1978) – theoretical physicist and professor in the theory group at the SLAC National Accelerator Laboratory; known for Peskin–Takeuchi parameter; fellow of the American Academy of Arts and Sciences
- Ward Plummer (Ph.D. 1967) – professor of physics at Louisiana State University; member of the National Academy of Sciences (2006)
- Mohit Randeria (Ph.D. 1987) – condensed matter physicist, fellow of the American Physical Society, Shanti Swarup Bhatnagar laureate
- Hubert Reeves (Ph.D. 1960) – astrophysicist
- Floyd K. Richtmyer (A.B. in 1904, Ph.D. 1910; professor of Physics) – president of Optical Society of America (1920); recipient of the Louis E. Levy Medal of the Franklin Institute for the study of X-rays (1929); member of the National Academy of Sciences (1932)
- Albert Rose (A.B. 1931, Ph.D. 1935) – physicist, known for his contributions to TV video camera tubes and originating the concept of Detective quantum efficiency; fellow of IEEE and of the American Physical Society and member of the National Academy of Engineering (1975); recipient of SMPTE's David Sarnoff Gold Medal(1958), IEEE Morris N. Liebmann Memorial Award (1946), IEEE Edison Medal (1979)
- Michael Roukes (Ph.D. 1985) – experimental physicist, nanoscientist, and the Robert M. Abbey Professor of Physics, Applied Physics, and Bioengineering at the California Institute of Technology
- Stephen Shenker (Ph.D. 1980) – theoretical physicist on string theory and a professor at Stanford University, former director of the Stanford Institute for Theoretical Physics; MacArthur Fellow (1987), fellow of American Physical Society (2003), the American Academy of Arts and Sciences (2006), member of the National Academy of Sciences (2015), recipient of Lars Onsager Prize (2010)
- Ernest J. Sternglass (B.S. 1944, Ph.D. 1948) – physicist, alerted the world to dangers of nuclear war
- J. J. Sakurai (Ph.D. 1958) – Japanese-American particle physicist and theorist who independently discovered the V-A theory of weak interactions while as graduate student at Cornell; the Sakurai Prize of the American Physical Society is named in his honor
- Daniel F. Styer (Ph.D. 1983) – professor of physics at Oberlin College
- Leonard Susskind (Ph.D. 1965) – theoretical physicist, Felix Bloch professor of theoretical physics at Stanford University, and director of the Stanford Institute for Theoretical Physics; "father of string theory"; member of the National Academy of Sciences (2000) and the American Academy of Arts and Sciences; recipient of the Sakurai Prize (1998), Pomeranchuk Prize (2008)
- C. Bruce Tarter (Ph.D.) – theoretical physicist; director emeritus of the University of California Lawrence Livermore National Laboratory who led the Laboratory between 1994 and 2002; fellow of the American Physical Society and the American Association for the Advancement of Science, recipient of the Roosevelts Gold Medal Award for Science (1998), National Nuclear Security Administration Gold Medal for Distinguished Service (2002), the U.S. Department of Energy Secretary's Gold Award (2004)
- Ted Taylor (Ph.D. 1956 theoretical physics) – director of Project Orion and designer of many small nuclear weapons
- Donald L. Turcotte (M.S. 1955 aerospace engineering) – distinguished professor emeritus at the University of California, Davis; member of the National Academy of Sciences (1986)
- Steven Weinberg (B.A. 1954) – professor of physics at University of Texas at Austin; Nobel laureate (1979)
- Steven R. White (Ph.D. 1987 physics) – professor of physics at the University of California, Irvine; fellow of the American Association for the Advancement of Science (2008) and of the American Academy of Arts and Sciences (2016), member of the National Academy of Sciences (2018)
- Ralph Walter Graystone Wyckoff (Ph.D. 1919) – crystallographer, pioneer of X-ray crystallography; member of the National Academy of Sciences (1949) and foreign member of the Royal Society

=== Astronomy, astrophysics and space physics ===
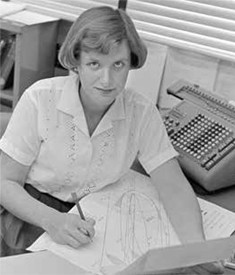
Marcia Neugebauer

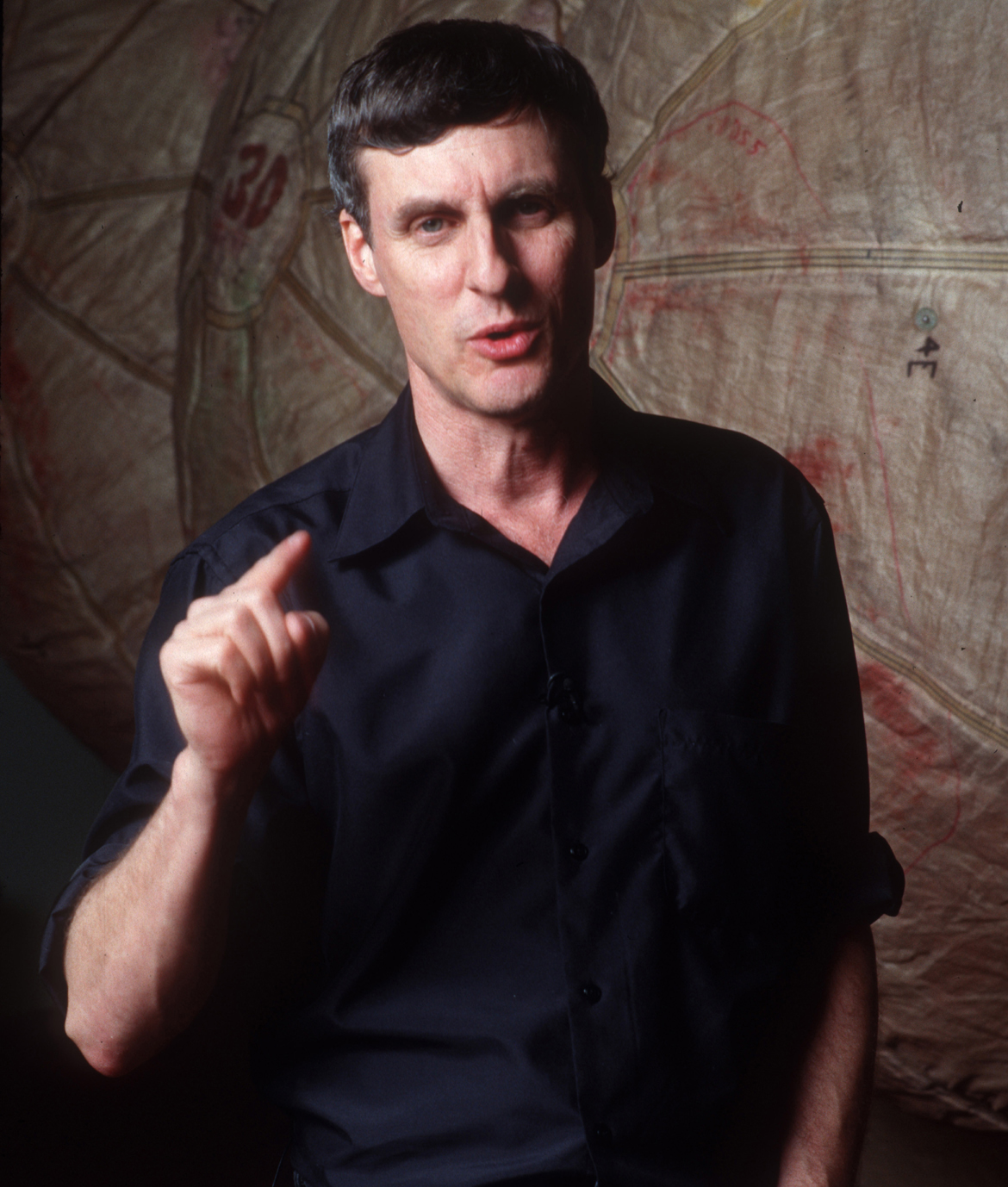
Steve Squyres

- Lars Bildsten (Ph.D. 1991) – sixth director of the Kavli Institute for Theoretical Physics at the University of California, Santa Barbara (UCSB); member of the National Academy of Sciences (2018)
- Joseph A. Burns (Ph.D. 1966, professor) – planetary scientist; fellow of the AGU and the AAAS
- Christopher Chyba (Ph.D. 1991) – professor of astrophysical sciences and international affairs at the Woodrow Wilson School, Princeton University; MacArthur Fellow (2001)
- William Coblentz (M.S. 1901, Ph.D. 1903) – physicist notable for his contributions to infrared radiometry and spectroscopy; member of the National Academy of Sciences (1930)
- Anita Cochran (B.S. 1976) – astronomer/planetary scientist who has worked on comet missions and served as chair of the AAS Division for Planetary Sciences
- Bruce T. Draine (M.S. 1975, Ph.D. 1978) – astrophysicist at Princeton University who also served as chair of the Princeton's Department of Astrophysical Sciences 1996–1998; recipient of Dannie Heineman Prize for Astrophysics (2004); member of the National Academy of Sciences (2007)
- Frank Drake (B.A. 1952 engineering physics; professor of astronomy, 1964–84) – SETI researcher and president (1984–2000), known for the Drake equation; member of the National Academy of Sciences (1972)
- William E. Gordon (Ph.D. 1953 EE; faculty member, 1953–1965) – "father of the Arecibo Observatory"; physicist and astronomer; member of the National Academy of Sciences (1968) and National Academy of Engineering (1975); fellow of the American Academy of Arts and Sciences (1986); recipient of Arctowski Medal from the National Academy of Sciences; dean of science and engineering, dean of natural sciences, and provost and vice president of Rice University
- Peter Goldreich (B.S. 1960, Ph.D. 1963) – astrophysicist, Lee A. DuBridge Professor of Astrophysics & Planetary Physics at Caltech; member of the National Academy of Sciences (1972) and the American Academy of Arts and Sciences; numerous awards and honors including Gold Medal of the Royal Astronomical Society (1993), National Medal of Science (1995), Grande Médaille (2006), and Shaw Prize (2007); Asteroid 3805 Goldreich is named after him
- Carl E. Heiles (B.S. engineering physics) – professor of astronomy at the University of California, Berkeley, known for Hénon–Heiles Equation; member of the National Academy of Sciences (1990)
- Renu Malhotra (Ph.D. 1988 physics) – Louise Foucar Marshall Science Research Professor and Regents' Professor at the University of Arizona; Harold C. Urey Prize recipient (1997), member of the National Academy of Sciences (2015) and of the American Academy of Arts and Sciences (2015), Asteroid 6698 named "Malhotra"
- Jean-Luc Margot (Ph.D. 1999, faculty member 2004–2008) – professor and chair of earth, planetary, and space sciences, and professor of physics and astronomy at the University of California, Los Angeles; Harold C. Urey Prize recipient (2004), Asteroid 9531 Jean-Luc named in his honor
- Isabel Martin Lewis (A.B. 1903, A.M. 1905) – eclipse expert, popularizer of astronomy; first woman hired by the United States Naval Observatory
- Gerry Neugebauer (B.A. 1954 physics) – astronomer, one of the founders of the infrared astronomy, co-discoverer of the Becklin-Neugebauer Object; Robert Andrews Millikan Professor of Physics, emeritus at Caltech; director of the Palomar Observatory (1980–1994); member of National Academy of Sciences (1973), the American Philosophical Society, the American Academy of Arts and Sciences, fellow of the Royal Astronomical Society, California Scientist of the Year (1986); recipient of the Rumford Prize (1986), Henry Norris Russell Lectureship (1996), the Herschel Medal (1998), the Bruce Medal (2010)
- Marcia Neugebauer (B.A. 1954 physics) – space physicist, senior research scientist at Jet Propulsion Laboratory (JPL), known for direct measurements of the solar wind; president of the American Geophysical Union (AGU) and editor-in-chief of its journal Reviews of Geophysics; fellow of American Geophysical Union, recipient of Arctowski Medal (2010)
- Meers Oppenheim (B.S. 1984, M.Eng. 1990) – professor of Astronomy at Boston University
- Stanton J. Peale (M.S. 1962, Ph.D. 1965) – astrophysicist, planetary scientist; recipient of Newcomb Cleveland Prize (1979), James Craig Watson Medal (1982) and Brouwer Award (1992), member of the National Academy of Sciences (2009)
- Judith Pipher (Ph.D. 1971) – astrophysicist and observational astronomer known for her contributions in infrared astronomy for the development of infrared detector arrays in space telescopes; an inductee of the National Women's Hall of Fame (2007)
- Vera Rubin (M.A. 1951) – astronomer known for contributions to the study of dark matter; member of the National Academy of Sciences; recipient of numerous of awards and honorary D.Sc. degrees for her achievements, including the National Medal of Science
- Paul L. Schechter (B.A. 1968) – astrophysicist and observational cosmologist, known for Schechter Luminosity Function and Press–Schechter formalism; William A. M. Burden Professor of Astrophysics at MIT; member of the National Academy of Sciences (2003)
- Gerald Schubert (B.E.P and M.A.E. 1961, engineering physics and aeronautical engineering) – geophysicist and professor emeritus of Earth, Planetary, and Space Sciences at UCLA; member of the National Academy of Sciences (2002), fellow of the American Geophysical Union (1975) and the American Academy of Arts and Sciences (2001)
- Irwin I. Shapiro (B.A. Mathematics) – astrophysicist, known for Shapiro time delay and 3832 Shapiro; Timken University Professor at Harvard University, director of the Harvard-Smithsonian Center for Astrophysics (1982–2004); member of the National Academy of Sciences (1974) and Guggenheim Fellow; recipient of numerous awards including Albert Einstein Medal from the Albert Einstein Society (1994)
- Steven Soter (Ph.D. 1971) – astrophysicist; recipient of 2014 Primetime Emmy Award (for writing Cosmos)
- Steven Squyres (B.A. 1978 geology, Ph.D. 1981 Planetary Science; Goldwin Smith Professor of Astronomy) – astronomer, principal science investigator for the Mars rovers Spirit and Opportunity, fellow of the American Academy of Arts and Sciences, recipient of Harold C. Urey Prize from the American Astronomical Society, the Benjamin Franklin Medal, Carl Sagan Memorial Award, the Wernher von Braun Award from National Space Society, the Space Science Award from American Institute of Aeronautics and Astronautics
- David J. Stevenson (M.S. 1972, Ph.D. 1976) – Marvin L. Goldberger Professor of Planetary Science at Caltech; fellow of the Royal Society and a member of the National Academy of Sciences (2004); recipient of H. C. Urey Prize (1984)
- Jill Tarter (B.E.P 1965) – astronomer, former director of the Center for SETI Research

=== Chemistry ===
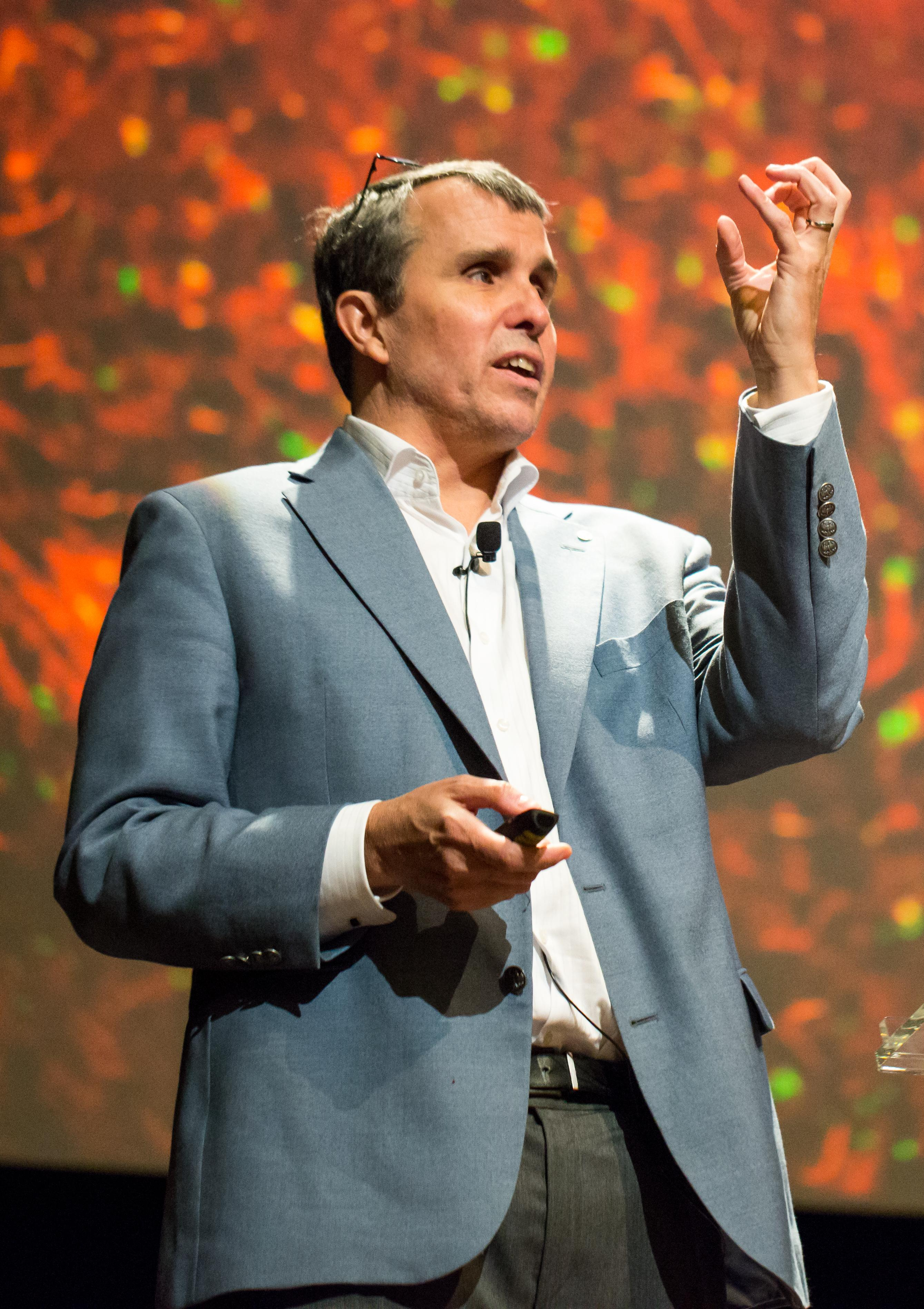
Eric Betzig

- John D. Baldeschwieler (B.S. 1956 chemical engineering) – chemist, known for molecular structure and spectroscopy; J. Stanley Johnson Professor and professor of chemistry, emeritus at Caltech; member of the National Academy of Sciences (1970), the American Academy of Arts and Sciences and the American Philosophical Society; recipient of National Medal of Science (2000)
- Stephen J. Benkovic (Ph.D. 1963) – chemist, known for the discovery of enzyme inhibitors; fellow of the American Academy of Arts and Sciences (1984); member of the National Academy of Sciences (1985) and the American Philosophical Society (2002); recipient of Christian B. Anfinsen Award (2000), Benjamin Franklin Medal in Life Science (2009), Ralph F. Hirschmann Award in Peptide Chemistry(2010), National Medal of Science (2010), NAS Award in Chemical Sciences (2011)
- Eric Betzig (M.S. 1985; Ph.D. applied and engineering physics 1988) – recipient of the 2014 Nobel Prize in chemistry
- Cynthia J. Burrows (Ph.D. 1982) – distinguished professor of chemistry and chair of the department of chemistry at the University of Utah; editor-in-chief of Accounts of Chemical Research; member of the National Academy of Sciences (2014) and fellow of the American Academy of Arts and Sciences (2009)
- Harry Coover (M.S. 1943, Ph.D. 1944) – prolific product inventor, notably cyanoacrylate adhesives (Super Glue); member of the National Inventors Hall of Fame and of the National Academy of Engineering (1983); recipient of National Medal of Technology and Innovation (2010)
- Christopher C. Cummins (A.B. 1989 chemistry) – Henry Dreyfus Professor of Chemistry at Massachusetts Institute of Technology; member of the National Academy of Sciences (2017)
- Alexander Dounce (Ph.D. 1935) – biochemist, inventor of the Dounce homogenizer
- Paul G. Gassman (Ph.D. 1960) – chemist best known for his research in the field of organic chemistry and his service as president of the American Chemical Society (1990); member of the National Academy of Sciences (1989) and the American Academy of Arts and Sciences (1992)
- William Francis Hillebrand (studied between 1870 and 1872) – chemist who served as president of the American Chemical Society in 1906 and was an elected member of the National Academy of Sciences (1908)
- Klaus Hofmann (research associate 1940–1942) – chemist and medical researcher at the University of Pittsburgh; member of the National Academy of Sciences (1963)
- Walter Kauzmann (B.A. 1937) – chemist and professor emeritus of Princeton University; fellow of the American Academy of Arts and Sciences (1963) and member of the National Academy of Sciences (1964)
- Neil L. Kelleher (M.S., Ph.D. 1997) – biochemist, known for mass spectrometry, top-down proteomics and the development of the fragmentation technique of wlectron-capture dissociation; Walter and Mary Elizabeth Glass Professor of Chemistry, Molecular Biosciences, and Medicine at Northwestern University
- Martha L. Ludwig (B.A, Ph.D.) – biochemist, recipient of Garvan–Olin Medal of the American Chemical Society (1984) and Distinguished Faculty Achievement Award from the University of Michigan (1986), fellow of the American Association for the Advancement of Science (2001), member of the National Academy of Sciences (2003) and the Institute of Medicine (2006), J. Lawrence Oncley Distinguished University Professor of Biological Chemistry at the University of Michigan
- Walter McCrone (B.S. 1938 chemistry, Ph.D. 1942 organic chemistry) – leading expert in microscopy, best known for work on the Shroud of Turin and the Vinland map
- Fred McLafferty (Ph.D. 1950; Peter J. W. Debye Professor of Chemistry) – chemist, known for McLafferty rearrangement reaction observed with mass spectrometry; member of the National Academy of Sciences
- Anne McNeil (Ph.D. 2005) – chemist and professor at University of Michigan
- Thomas Midgley Jr. (M.E. 1911) – inventor of Freon and tetraethyllead; member of the National Academy of Sciences (1942)
- Sharmila M. Mukhopadhyay (Ph.D. 1979) – Indian professor of material science and director of the Center for Nanoscale Multifunctional Materials at Wright State University
- Samuel Wilson Parr (M.S. 1895) – chemist, known for his discovery of alloy illium; president of the American Chemical Society (1928); founder of Parr Instrument Company
- Sarah Ratner ('24 Chemistry) – biochemist who received Garvan–Olin Medal in 1961; member of the National Academy of Sciences (1974) and fellow of the American Academy of Arts and Sciences (1974)
- Lester J. Reed (post-doctoral fellow 1946–1948) – biochemist, Ashbel Smith Professor Emeritus at University of Texas at Austin; member of the National Academy of Sciences (1973)
- Eugene G. Rochow (B.S. 1931, Ph.D. 1935) – inorganic chemist; awarded the Perkin Medal
- Sofia Simmonds (Ph.D. 1942) – biochemist at Yale University; Garvan–Olin Medal recipient in 1969
- Thressa Stadtman (B.S. 1940, M.S. 1942) – biochemist known for the discovery of selenocysteine; member of the National Academy of Sciences (1981) and of the American Academy of Arts and Sciences (1982)
- Ching W. Tang (Ph.D. 1975) – physical chemist and the Doris Johns Cherry Professor of Chemical Engineering at the University of Rochester, known for his work on Organic LED; inductee to the National Inventors Hall of Fame (2018), member of the National Academy of Engineering and recipient of the Wolf Prize in Chemistry (2011)
- Edward C. Taylor (B.A. 1946, Ph.D. 1949) – chemist and author of over 450 scientific papers and 52 U.S. patents; A. Barton Hepburn Professor of Organic Chemistry and department chairman at Princeton University; inventor of the most successful new and broadly effective anticancer drug pemetrexed (brand name Alimta); recipient of numerous awards including the 2006 Heroes of Chemistry Award from the American Chemical Society for his work on the discovery and development of Alimta "that has led to the welfare and progress of humanity"
- Adam S. Veige (Ph.D.) – inorganic chemist; director of the Center for Catalysis in the department of chemistry at the University of Florida;
- Benjamin Widom (Ph.D. 1953; Goldwin Smith Professor of Chemistry 1954–) – physical chemist; awarded the Boltzmann Medal; member of the National Academy of Sciences (1974) and fellow of the American Academy of Arts and Sciences
- Mary Louisa Willard (PhD, 1927) – chemist and forensic scientist; expert in application of chemical microscopy to forensic science and criminology
- Karen L. Wooley (Ph.D. 1993 polymer/organic chemistry) – distinguished professor at Texas A&M University; member of the National Academy of Sciences (2020)

=== Computer science and computer engineering ===
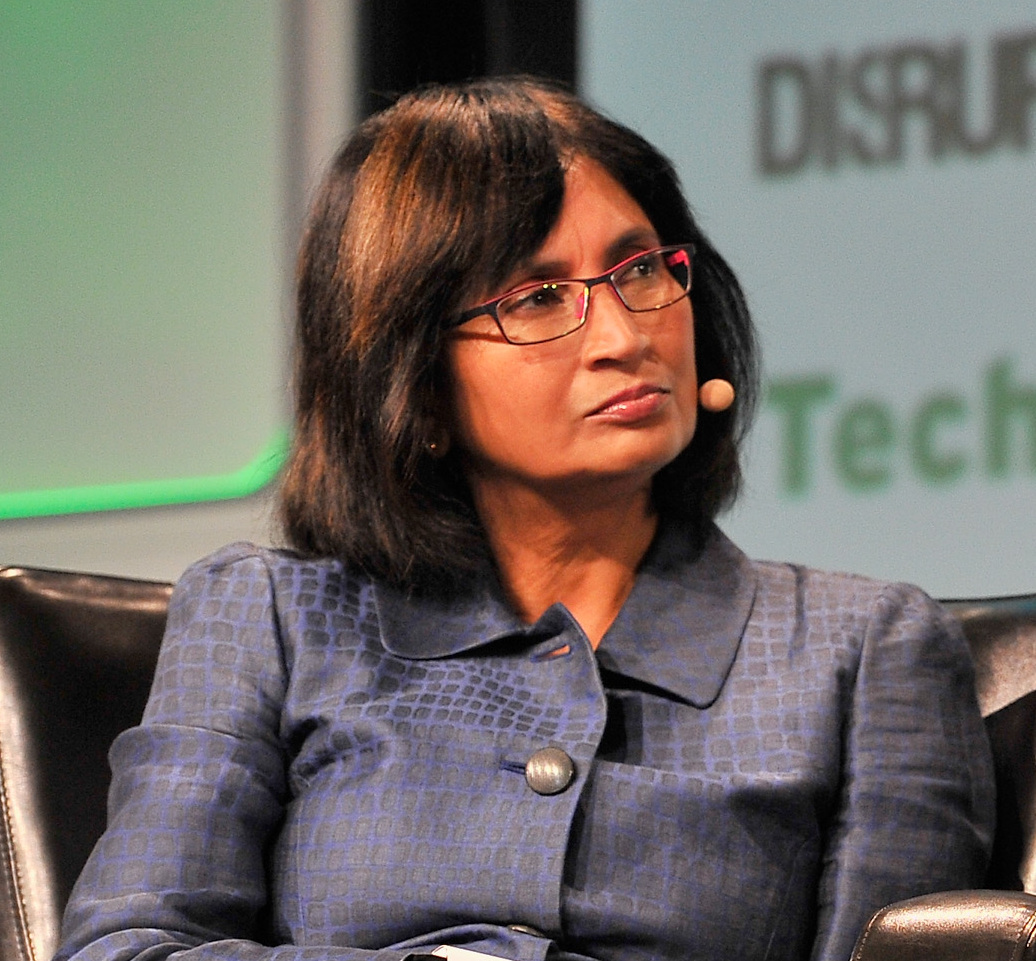
Padmasree Warrior

- Scott Aaronson (B.S. 2000 computer science) – theoretical computer scientist and faculty member in electrical engineering and computer science at the Massachusetts Institute of Technology; recipient of Alan T. Waterman Award (2012) and PECASE (2010)
- Chandrajit Bajaj (M.S. 1983, Ph.D. 1984 computer science) – professor of computer science at the University of Texas at Austin; ACM Fellow (2009), fellow of the American Association for the Advancement of Science (2008)
- Regina Barzilay (postdoctoral fellow) – professor at the Massachusetts Institute of Technology; MacArthur Fellow (2017)
- Richard Blahut (Ph.D. 1972) – former chair of the electrical and computer engineering department at the University of Illinois at Urbana–Champaign; fellow of the IEEE (1981) and member of the National Academy of Engineering (1981), recipient of the IEEE Alexander Graham Bell Medal (1998)
- Allan Borodin (Ph.D. 1969 computer science) – Canadian-American computer scientist who has been on faculty since 1969, served as department chair 1980–1985; became university professor in 2011 at the University of Toronto; member of the Royal Society of Canada; recipient of CRM-Fields-PIMS prize; fellow of the American Association for the Advancement of Science (2011) and ACM (2014)
- Jennifer Tour Chayes (postdoctoral fellow 1985–1987) – member of the National Academy of Sciences (2019)
- Edmund M. Clarke (M.S. 1974, Ph.D. 1976) – winner of the 2007 Association for Computing Machinery A.M. Turing Award; winner of the IEEE Computer Society Harry H. Goode Memorial Award and the Bower Award and Prize for Achievement in Science (2014); member of the National Academy of Engineering (2005) and the American Academy of Arts and Sciences (2011)
- Richard W. Conway (B.S. 1954 BME, Ph.D. 1958 mathematics genealogy) – Emerson Electric Company Professor of Manufacturing Management Emeritus at Cornell University; known for his contributions and leadership in the area of scheduling theory, simulation methodology, and simulation software for manufacturing; member of the National Academy of Engineering (1992)
- Robert L. Cook (M.S. 1981 computer graphics) – Academy Award for creation of RenderMan rendering software; member of the National Academy of Engineering (2009) and fellow of the Association for Computing Machinery (1999)
- Frederick J. Damerau (B.A. 1953) – pioneer of natural language processing and data mining, known for Damerau–Levenshtein distance
- Susan B. Davidson (B.A. 1978 mathematics) – Weiss Professor of Computer and Information Science at University of Pennsylvania; ACM Fellow (2001)
- Tom DeMarco (B.E.E.) – software engineer and early developer of structured analysis in the 1970s; member of the ACM and fellow of the IEEE; recipient of the Warnier Prize for "Lifetime Contribution to the Field of Computing" (1986), and the Stevens Award for "Contribution to the Methods of Software Development" (1999); author of over nine books and 100 papers on project management and software development
- Cynthia Dwork (Ph.D. 1983 computer science) – distinguished computer scientist at Microsoft Research; fellow of the American Academy of Arts and Sciences, member of the National Academy of Engineering and the National Academy of Sciences (2014); recipient of Dijkstra Prize (2007), the PET Award for Outstanding Research in Privacy Enhancing Technologies (2009)
- Lauren Elliott (attended 3 years, transferred) – video game designer, internet entrepreneur, publisher and inventor; co-designer of the Carmen Sandiego series, which remains the best-selling edutainment game in history
- Pedro Felipe Felzenszwalb (B.S. 1999 computer science) – ACM Grace Murray Hopper Award winner (2013)
- Zvi Galil (Ph.D. 1975) – computer scientist, specialized in design and analysis of algorithms, graph algorithms and string matching; fellow of the American Academy of Arts and Sciences and ACM, member of the National Academy of Engineering; honorary Doctor of Mathematics from the University of Waterloo
- Sanjay Ghemawat (B.S. 1987) – Google Senior Fellow; member of the National Academy of Engineering (2009), recipient of ACM-Infosys Foundation Award in the Computing Sciences (2012)
- Andrew C. Greenberg (B.S. 1979) – co-creator of the massively successful early computer game Wizardry
- Donald P. Greenberg (B.C.E. 1958, Ph.D. 1968) – computer graphics pioneer and educator; member of the National Academy of Engineering (1991), fellow of ACM (1995)
- Barbara J. Grosz (B.S. 1969) – Higgins Professor of Natural Sciences and former dean of Radcliffe Institute for Advanced Study at Harvard University; member of the American Philosophical Society (2003), the American Academy of Arts and Sciences (2004), and the National Academy of Engineering (2008), fellow of the Association for the Advancement of Artificial Intelligence (1990), the American Association for the Advancement of Science (1990), and the Association for Computing Machinery (2004)
- Jerrier A. Haddad (B.S. 1945 electrical engineering) – fellow of IEEE and of the American Association for the Advancement of Science, member of the National Academy of Engineering (1968)
- Morton Heilig (1943) – early virtual reality pioneer, inventor
- William Higinbotham (graduate study) – developer of Tennis for Two, 1958, one of the earliest video games
- Neil Immerman (Ph.D. 1980) – theoretical computer scientist, recipient of Gödel Prize for Immerman–Szelepcsényi theorem (1995), ACM Fellow and Guggenheim Fellow
- Ravindran Kannan (Ph.D.) – computer scientist, principal researcher at Microsoft Research India; William K. Lanman Jr. Professor of Computer Science and Professor of Applied Mathematics at Yale University; recipient of Knuth Prize (2011)
- Randy Katz (B.A. 1976) – computer scientist, developed the redundant array of inexpensive disks (RAID) concept for computer storage; distinguished professor of electrical engineering and computer science, vice chancellor for research (2018–) at University of California, Berkeley; fellow of the ACM and the IEEE, member of the National Academy of Engineering and the American Academy of Arts and Sciences; recipient of IEEE James H. Mulligan, Jr. Education Medal (2010)
- Dan Klein (B.A. 1998 mathematics, CS, linguistics) – computer scientist at the University of California, Berkeley; recipient of the Grace Murray Hopper Award (2006)
- Jon Kleinberg (B.S. 1993, professor of computer science) – MacArthur Fellow (2005), researcher of combinatorial network structure; member of the National Academy of Engineering (2008) and the National Academy of Sciences (2011); recipient of Nevanlinna Prize (2006), ACM-Infosys Foundation Award (2008), Harvey Prize (2013)
- Dexter Kozen (Ph.D. 1977 computer science; Joseph Newton Pew, Jr. Professor in Engineering) – theoretical computer scientist; elected ACM fellow (2003), Guggenheim Fellow (1991) and fellow of the American Association for the Advancement of Science (2008)
- Susan Landau (M.S. 1979) – Guggenheim Fellow and cybersecurity specialist
- Ruby B. Lee (B.A. 1973) – Forrest G. Hamrick Professor in Engineering at Princeton University; fellow of the ACM (2001) and of the IEEE (2002)
- Marc Levoy (B.Arch. 1976, M.S. 1978 architecture) – developed technology and algorithms for digitizing 3D objects that led to the Digital Michelangelo Project
- Steven H. Low (B.S. 1987 electrical engineering) – professor of the Computing and Mathematical Sciences Department and the Electrical Engineering Department at the California Institute of Technology; IEEE Fellow (2008)
- Douglas McIlroy (B.E.P. 1954) – inventor of the pipes and filters architecture of Unix and the concept of software componentry; member of the National Academy of Engineering (2006)
- Marshall Kirk McKusick (B.S. electrical engineering) – computer scientist, known for his extensive work on BSD
- Kurt Mehlhorn (Ph.D. 1974) – theoretical computer scientist; vice president of the Max Planck Society and director of the Max Planck Institute for Computer Science; foreign member of the National Academy of Engineering, ACM Fellow; recipient of numerous other awards and honors including Leibniz Prize (1987), Konrad Zuse Medal (1995), EATCS Award (2010), Paris Kanellakis Award (2010), and so on
- Robert Tappan Morris (graduate study 1988–89, suspended) – author of the Morris Worm (1988) and co-founder of Viaweb; professor at Massachusetts Institute of Technology; fellow of the ACM and member of the National Academy of Engineering (2019)
- Cherri M. Pancake (bachelor's degree, environmental design) – elected Fellow (2001) and president (2018–) of the ACM
- Thomas W. Parks (B.S., M.S., Ph.D. electrical engineering) – professor emeritus of electrical and computer engineering at Cornell University, known for his contributions to digital signal processing; member of the National Academy of Engineering (2010)
- Christopher Ré (B.S. 2001) – computer scientist on the faculty of Stanford University; MacArthur Fellow (2015)
- Edward Reingold (Ph.D.) – computer scientist in the fields of algorithms, data structures, and calendrical calculations who was elected a fellow of the ACM (1996)
- Michael Reiter (M.S. 1991, Ph.D. 1993 computer science) – Lawrence M. Slifkin Distinguished Professor of Computer Science at the University of North Carolina at Chapel Hill; former professor of electrical & computer engineering and computer science at Carnegie Mellon University; ACM Fellow (2008) and IEEE Fellow (2014)
- Jason Rohrer (B.S. 2000) – independent video game designer
- Tim Roughgarden (Ph.D. 2002) – computer scientist at Stanford University; recipient of the Grace Murray Hopper Award (2009) and the Gödel Prize (2012)
- Daniela L. Rus (Ph.D.) – Andrew and Erna Viterbi Professor of Electrical Engineering and Computer Science (EECS) at the Massachusetts Institute of Technology; former professor of computer science at Dartmouth College; MacArthur Fellow (2002), fellow of the ACM (2014), IEEE (2009), and AAAI (2009), member of the National Academy of Engineering
- Sartaj Sahni (Ph.D. 1973) – computer scientist at the University of Florida; fellow of IEEE (1988) and of the ACM (1996); fellow of the American Association for the Advancement of Science
- Robert B. Schnabel (M.S. 1975, Ph.D. 1977) – CEO of the ACM (2015–), dean and professor of the school of informatics and computing at Indiana University (2007–2015), ACM Fellow (2010)
- Fred B. Schneider (B.S. 1975 computer science and electrical engineering) – Samuel B Eckert Professor of Computer Science at Cornell University; fellow of the American Association for Advancement of Science (1992), the ACM (1995) and the IEEE (2008), member of the National Academy of Engineering (2011)
- Raimund Seidel (Ph.D. 1987) – German and Austrian theoretical computer scientist known for the Kirkpatrick–Seidel algorithm, director of Leibniz Center for Informatics at Schloss Dagstuhl (2014–)
- Scott Shenker (postdoctoral fellow 1983–1984) – computer scientist at UC Berkeley; member of the National Academy of Sciences (2019)
- Amit Singhal (Ph.D. 1996) – Google search guru who heads Google's core ranking team and is a senior vice president at Google Inc.; Google Fellow, fellow of the ACM; member of the National Academy of Engineering
- Steven Sinofsky (B.S. 1987) – Microsoft computer engineer, president of Windows division, 2009–2012
- George Stibitz (Ph.D. 1930 mathematical physics) – one of the "fathers" of the modern first digital computer; member of the National Academy of Engineering, inductee to the National Inventors Hall of Fame; recipient of Harry H. Goode Memorial Award (1965), IEEE Emanuel R. Piore Award (1977), IEEE's Computer Pioneer Award for First Remote Computation (1982)
- Padmasree Warrior (M.S., chemical engineering) – Chief Technical Officer at Cisco
- Jennifer Widom (M.S. 1985, Ph.D. 1987) – dean of the school of engineering (2017–), Fletcher Jones Professor of Computer Science and Electrical Engineering at Stanford University; member of the National Academy of Engineering (2005) and the American Academy of Arts and Sciences (2009), ACM Fellow (2005)
- Robert Woodhead – co-creator of the massively successful early computer game Wizardry; co-founder of AnimEigo

=== Engineering, material science ===
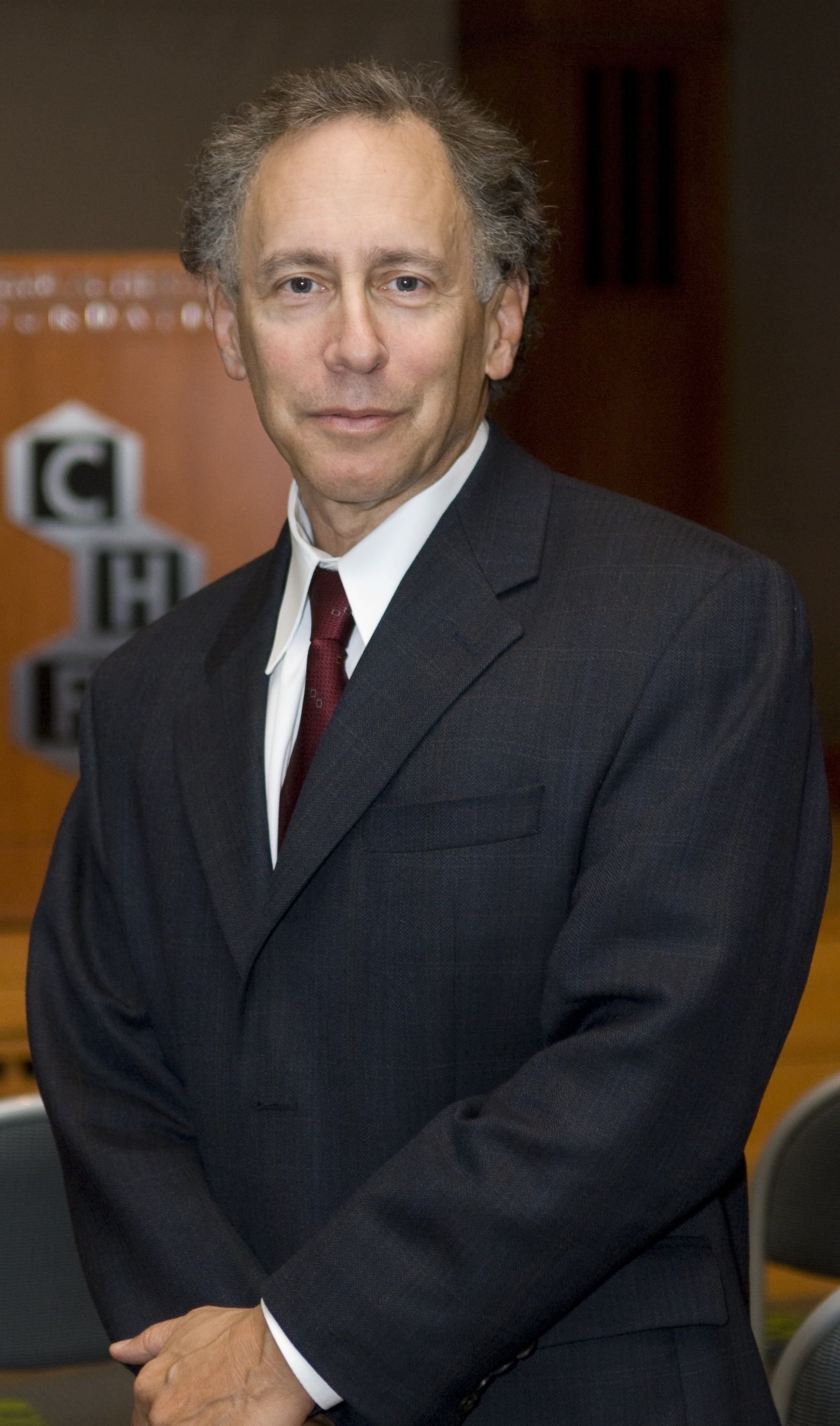
Robert Langer

- William Howard Arnold (B.A. 1951 chemistry and physics) – nuclear physicist and former president of Westinghouse Nuclear International, Westinghouse Electric Corporation; member of the National Academy of Engineering (1974)
- Nora Stanton Barney (B.C.E. 1905) – first woman in the United States to obtain a degree in civil engineering; civil engineer, architect, and suffragist
- Manson Benedict (B.S. Chemistry) – nuclear engineering pioneer and chemist on Manhattan Project and MIT Professor, recipient of William H. Walker Award (1947), Perkin Medal (1966), Robert E. Wilson Award (1968), Enrico Fermi Award (1972), National Medal of Science (1975), John Fritz Medal (1975), fellow of the American Academy of Arts and Sciences (1952), member of the National Academy of Sciences (1956) and of the National Academy of Engineering (1967)
- Joel S. Birnbaum (B.S. engineering physics) – member of the National Academy of Engineering (1989) and the Royal Academy of Engineering; fellow of the American Academy of Arts and Sciences, the IEEE, and the ACM
- Ralph Bown (M.E., M.M.E., Ph.D.) – electrical engineer, radar expert; recipient of IEEE Medal of Honor (1949) and IEEE Founders Medal (1961)
- Oliver Ellsworth Buckley (Ph.D. 1914) – electrical engineer known for his contributions to the field of submarine telephony, president (1940–1951) and chairman (1951–1952) of Bell Labs; member of the National Academy of Sciences (1937) and fellow of the American Academy of Arts and Sciences, the American Physical Society and the American Institute of Electrical Engineers; recipient of the IEEE Edison Medal (1954); the Oliver E. Buckley Condensed Matter Prize is named in his honor
- Walker Lee Cisler (Class of 1922, mechanical engineering) – president of the American Society of Mechanical Engineers (1960–1961), founding member of the National Academy of Engineering; fellow of the IEEE; recipient of Hoover Medal (1962), IEEE Edison Medal (1965) and John Fritz Medal (1967)
- Frederick J. Clarke (M.S. 1940 civil engineering) – chief of engineers of the United States Army Corps of Engineers (1969–1973), member of the National Academy of Engineering
- Robert E. Cohen (B.S. 1968) – Raymond A. (1921) and Helen E. St. Laurent Professor of Chemical Engineering at Massachusetts Institute of Technology; member of the National Academy of Engineering (2010), fellow of the American Academy of Arts and Sciences (2015) and of the American Physical Society (2004)
- Harold Craighead (Ph.D. 1980) – Charles W. Lake Professor of Engineering at Cornell University; member of the National Academy of Engineering (2007)
- John P. Craven (1946 civil engineering) – pioneer of spying at sea who served as Chief Scientist of the Special Projects Office of the United States Navy; member of the National Academy of Engineering (1970)
- Philip Dalton (B.S. 1924) – US Naval Reserve officer and inventor of the E6-B analog computer
- Edward Andrew Deeds (graduate studies) – engineer, inventor and industrialist, co-founded Delco
- Lester F. Eastman (B.S. 1953, M.S. 1955, Ph.D. 1957 electrical and computer engineering) – John L. Given Professor Emeritus of Engineering at Cornell University; member of the National Academy of Engineering (1986) and fellow of the American Physical Society and IEEE
- William Littell Everitt (E.E. 1922) – electrical engineer and radar pioneer; fellow and president (1945) of Institute of Radio Engineers, fellow of AIEE, founding member of the National Academy of Engineering, member of the American Association for the Advancement of Science, the American Society for Engineering Education, the Acoustical Society of America; recipient of IEEE Medal of Honor (1954), IEEE James H. Mulligan, Jr. Education Medal (1957)
- Herbert S. Fairbank (B.S. civil engineering 1910) – helped plan and design the United States Interstate Highway System
- Bancroft Gherardi, Jr. (M.E. 1893, M.M.E 1894) – electrical engineer, known for pioneering work in developing the early telephone systems in the United States; member of National Academy of Sciences (1933), fellow of the American Institute of Electrical Engineers and served as its president from (1927 – 1928); recipient of IEEE Edison Medal (1932)
- Meredith Gourdine (B.S. 1953) – Olympic silver medalist (1952), engineer and physicist, known for air pollution control, non-contact printing; member of the National Academy of Engineering (1991), inductee into the Engineering and Science Hall of Fame (1994)
- Carol K. Hall (B.A. 1967) – Camille Dreyfus Distinguished University Professor at the North Carolina State University; member of the National Academy of Engineering (2005)
- R. John Hansman Jr. (B.A. 1976 physics) – T. Wilson Professor of Aeronautics and Astronautics at Massachusetts Institute of Technology; member of the National Academy of Engineering (2013)
- George R. Hill III (Ph.D. 1946 chemistry) – chemist; a world authority on coal; served as dean of the College of Mines and Mineral Industries at the University of Utah 1966–1972; member of the National Academy of Engineering (1989)
- Clarence Floyd Hirshfeld (M.A. 1905 mechanical engineering) – John Fritz Medal recipient (1940)
- David A. Hodges (B.E.E. 1960) – professor, department chair, and dean, professor emeritus at the University of California, Berkeley; member of the National Academy of Engineering; IEEE Fellow; recipient of ASEE's Benjamin Garver Lamme Award (1999), IEEE's James H. Mulligan, Jr. Education Medal (1997), and IEEE Morris N. Liebmann Memorial Award (1983)
- Emerson C. Itschner (graduate degree 1926, civil engineering) – lieutenant general and Chief of Engineers of the United States Army Corps of Engineers (1956–1961)
- Dugald C. Jackson (postgraduate student and instructor in electrical engineering 1885–1887) – professor and department chair of electrical engineering of the Massachusetts Institute of Technology 1907–1935; recipient of IEEE Edison Medal (1938); president of the American Academy of Arts and Sciences (1937–1939)
- James C. Keck (B.S. 1947, Ph.D. 1951) – Ford Professor of Engineering at Massachusetts Institute of Technology; member of the National Academy of Engineering (2002)
- Arturo A. Keller (B.S., B.A. 1980) – civil and environmental engineer
- Thomas J. Kelly (B.S. 1951 mechanical engineering) – known as the "father of the Lunar Module"; member of the National Academy of Engineering (1991)
- Viswanathan Kumaran (Ph.D.1991) – recipient of Shanti Swarup Bhatnagar Prize for Science and Technology (2000) and Infosys Prize (engineering and computer science, 2016)
- Robert S. Langer (B.S. 1970 chemical engineering) – leading figure in biochemical engineering and science, David H. Koch Institute Professor at the Massachusetts Institute of Technology; author of over 1060 granted or pending patents and 1,300 scientific papers; founder of multiple technology companies; member of the National Academy of Sciences (1992), the National Academy of Engineering and the Institute of Medicine, recipient of more than 220 major awards including Gairdner Foundation International Award (1996), Charles Stark Draper Prize (2002), Harvey Prize (2003), John Fritz Medal (2003), National Medal of Science (2006), National Medal of Technology and Innovation (2011), Kyoto Prize (2014), Queen Elizabeth Prize for Engineering (2015), Wolf Prize in Chemistry (2013), $3 million Breakthrough Prize in Life Sciences (2014)
- George W. Lewis (B.S. 1910 mechanical engineering) – director of Aeronautical Research at the National Advisory Committee for Aeronautics (NACA); member of the National Academy of Sciences (1945); recipient of Daniel Guggenheim Medal (1936), ASME Spirit of St. Louis Medal (1944); Medal for Merit (1948)
- Edwin N. Lightfoot (B.S., Ph.D. chemical engineering) – known for his research in transport phenomena, member of the National Academy of Engineering (1979) and of the National Academy of Sciences (1995), E. V. Murphree Award (1994), recipient of the National Medal of Science (2004)
- William Littlewood (B.S. 1920 mechanical engineering) – aeronautical engineer, former vice–president of American Airlines, president of both SAE and AIAA; recipient of Wright Brothers Medal (1935) and Daniel Guggenheim Medal (1958)
- Umesh Mishra (Ph.D. 1984) – professor of electrical & computer engineering at the University of California, Santa Barbara; member of the National Academy of Engineering (2009) and the National Academy of Inventors (2015), fellow of IEEE
- Linn F. Mollenauer (B.S. 1959 engineering physics) – Bell Labs Fellow at Lucent Technologies; fellow of the Optical Society of America, the American Physical Society, IEEE, and the American Association for the Advancement of Science, member of the National Academy of Inventors (1993) for his contributions to the realization of soliton-based, ultra-high-capacity lightwave communication
- Richard Moore (Ph.D. 1951) – remote sensing pioneer; fellow of American Association for the Advancement of Science (1993); Life Fellow of IEEE; member of National Academy of Engineering (1989); recipient of Australia Prize for Remote Sensing (1995), Remote Sensing Award from Italian Center (1995); IEEE Centennial Medal (1984); Distinguished Achievement Award of IEEE Geoscience and Remote Sensing Society (1982) and Outstanding Technical Achievement Award of IEEE Oceanic Engineering Society (1978)
- A. Stephen Morse (B.S. 1962 electric engineering) – Dudley Professor of distributed control and adaptive control in electrical engineering at Yale University; member of the National Academy of Engineering (2002)
- Edward I. Moses (B.S., Ph.D.) – member of the National Academy of Engineering (2009) and fellow of the American Association for the Advancement of Science
- Sanford Alexander Moss (Ph.D.) – aviation engineer and inventor; the first to use a turbocharger on an aircraft engine; an inductee to the National Aviation Hall of Fame (1976); recipient of Howard N. Potts Medal (1946) and Collier Trophy (1940)
- Paul M. Naghdi (B.S. 1946 mechanical engineering) – former professor of mechanical engineering at the University of California, Berkeley and member of the National Academy of Engineering (1984)
- Venkatesh Narayanamurti (Ph.D. 1965 physics) – Benjamin Peirce Professor of Technology and Public Policy, former dean (1998–2008) of the School of Engineering and Applied Sciences at Harvard University; member of the National Academy of Engineering (1992) and of the American Academy of Arts and Sciences (2007)
- Priscilla Nelson (Ph.D. 1983 geotechnical engineering) – professor of civil and environmental engineering, provost and senior vice president for Academic Affairs (2005–2008) of New Jersey Institute of Technology; fellow of the American Association for the Advancement of Science
- John Ochsendorf (B.S. 1996) – professor of civil and environmental engineering at Massachusetts Institute of Technology; MacArthur Fellow (2008)
- Arthur A. Oliner (Ph.D. 1946 physics) – professor emeritus of Electrophysics at Polytechnic Institute of New York University; member of the National Academy of Engineering (1991) for contributions to the theory of guided electromagnetic waves and antennas
- Thomas D. O'Rourke (B.S. 1970 civil engineering; Thomas R. Biggs Professor, Civil & Environmental Engineering) – geotechnical engineer; president of Earthquake Engineering Research Institute (2002–2004); fellow of the American Association for the Advancement of Science, member of the National Academy of Engineering
- John Prausnitz (B.S. 1950) – applied physical chemist, known for developed molecular thermodynamics; chemical engineering professor at UC Berkeley since 1955; member of the National Academy of Sciences (1973), the National Academy of Engineering and the American Academy of Arts and Sciences; recipient of the National Medal of Science
- Paul V. Roberts (Ph.D. 1966 chemical engineering) – environmental engineer, former C.L. Peck, Class of 1906 professor in the school of engineering at Stanford University; member of the National Academy of Engineering and the Swiss Academy of Sciences
- Harris J. Ryan (Class of 1887) – electrical engineer; professor, first at Cornell University (1888–1905) and later at Stanford University (1905–1931); known for his contributions to high voltage power transmission; president of the American Institute of Electrical Engineers (1923–1924); member of the National Academy of Sciences (1920) and recipient of IEEE Edison Medal (1925)
- Al Seckel – creator of the Darwin Fish
- David H. Shepard (B.E.E. 1945) – inventor, known for the first optical character recognition device, first voice recognition system and the Farrington B numeric font used on credit cards
- Kang G. Shin (M.S. 1976, Ph.D. 1978 electrical engineering) – Kevin and Nancy O'Connor Professor of Computer Science at the University of Michigan; fellow of the IEEE, and the ACM, recipient of Ho-Am Prize in Engineering (2006)
- Arthur M. Squires (Ph.D. 1947 physical chemistry) – university distinguished professor, emeritus at Virginia Tech; member of the National Academy of Engineering (1977)
- Peter Swerling (A.B. 1949 economics) – radar theoretician known for Swerling Target Models; member of the National Academy of Engineering and fellow of Institute of Electrical and Electronics Engineers (IEEE)
- James S. Thorp (B.S. 1959, M.S. 1961, Ph.D. 1962) – Hugh P. and Ethel C. Kelly Professor Emeritus & Research Professor at Virginia Tech; recipient of Benjamin Franklin Medal (2008), member of the National Academy of Engineering (1996)
- A. Galip Ulsoy (M.S. 1975 mechanical engineering) – C.D. Mote Jr. Distinguished University Professor Emeritus of Mechanical Engineering at the University of Michigan; member of the National Academy of Engineering (2006)
- William J. Wilgus (correspondence student, 1883–1885) – designer and chief engineer for the building of Grand Central Terminal, 1902–1913
- Bertram Wolfe (Ph.D. 1954 nuclear physics) – vice president of GE and manager of its Nuclear Energy Division, 32nd president (1986–1987) and fellow of the American Nuclear Society; member of the National Academy of Engineering (1980)
- Jerry Woodall (Ph.D. 1982) – inventor and scientist, best known for his invention of the first commercially viable heterojunction material GaAlAs for red LEDs used in automobile brake lights and traffic lights, CD and DVD players, TV remote controls and computer networks; recipient of National Medal of Technology and Innovation (2001); member of the National Academy of Engineering (1989)
- Shu Yang – fellow of the Royal Society of Chemistry, American Physical Society, National Academy of Inventors and Materials Research Society

=== Industrial and labor relations ===
- Francine D. Blau (B.S. 1966 industrial and labor relations) – Cornell University economics professor and affiliate of the National Bureau of Economic Research, first woman to receive the IZA Prize in Labor Economics
- Sara Horowitz (B.A. 1984 ILR) – labor lawyer; MacArthur Fellow (1999)
- Randi Weingarten (B.S. 1980 labor relations) – president of the United Federation of Teachers (1998–2008) and of the American Federation of Teachers (2008–)

=== Biological sciences (biology, ecology, botany, nutrition, biophysics, biochemistry) ===
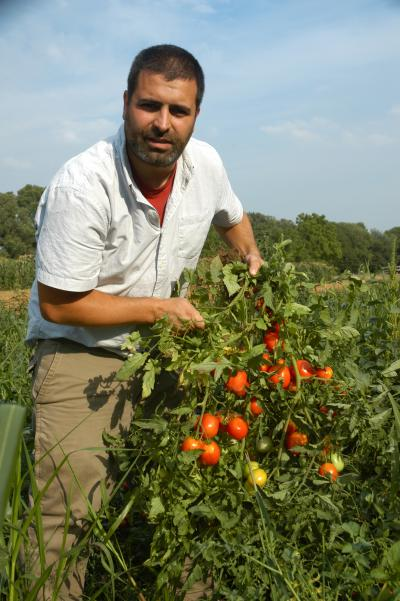
Zach Lippman

- Margaret Altmann – biologist
- Shannon B. Olsson (Ph.D. 2005)– Neuroethologist and ecologist, known for her work in chemical ecology and olfaction in natural systems. Director of the Echo Network, Faculty at National Centre for Biological Sciences, Tata Institute of Fundamental Research in India. Notable for interdisciplinary research integrating chemistry, biology, and ecology to understand sensory ecology in insects and other species.
- Bruce Ames (B.A. 1950 chemistry/biochemistry) – biochemist, Professor of Biochemistry and Molecular Biology at the University of California, Berkeley; inventor of Ames test; member of National Academy of Sciences (1972), fellow of the American Academy of Arts and Sciences; recipient of Charles S. Mott Prize (1983), Gairdner Foundation International Award (1983), Tyler Prize for Environmental Achievement (1985), AIC Gold Medal (1981), Japan Prize (1997), National Medal of Science (1998), Thomas Hunt Morgan Medal (2004)
- Rudolph John Anderson (Ph.D.) – biochemist and professor at Cornell University (1920–1926) and Yale University (1926–1948); member of the National Academy of Sciences (1946)
- George W. Archibald (Ph.D. 1975) – ornithologist, co–founder of the International Crane Foundation; MacArthur Fellow (1984), inaugural winner of the 2006 Indianapolis Prize
- George Francis Atkinson (B.A. 1885) – botanist and mycologist, president of the Botanical Society of America (1907) and member of the National Academy of Sciences (1918)
- Stephen Moulton Babcock, developed the "single-grain experiment" (in 1907–11) which led to the development of nutrition as a science
- Fred Baker (B.S. 1870, civil engineering) – macalologist, founder of the Scripps Institution of Oceanography
- Robert C. Baker (B.S. 1943; professor) – inventor of the chicken nugget
- Ian T. Baldwin (Ph.D. 1989) – ecologist; founding director of the Max Planck Institute for Chemical Ecology; member of the National Academy of Sciences (2013)
- Harlan Parker Banks (Ph.D. 1940) – paleobotanist who served as president of the Botanical Society of America (1969); member of the National Academy of Sciences (1980)
- Nathan Banks (B.S. 1889, M.S. 1890) – entomologist noted for his work on neuroptera, megaloptera, hymenoptera, and acarina; fellow of the American Academy of Arts and Sciences (1922)
- May Berenbaum (Ph.D. 1980) – entomologist, fellow of the American Academy of Arts and Sciences and member of the National Academy of Sciences (1994), recipient of the Tyler Prize for Environmental Achievement (2011) and the National Medal of Science (2014)
- Adam Bogdanove (Ph.D. 1997) – plant pathologist, known for discovering the modularity of TAL effectors in 2009 and since revolutionizing DNA targeting
- Frank E. Buck – Canadian horticulturalist
- Ring Cardé (M.S. 1967, Ph.D. 1971) – entomologist
- Donald Caspar (B.A. 1950) – structural biologist known for his works on the structures of biological molecules, particularly of the tobacco mosaic virus; fellow of the American Academy of Arts and Sciences and of the Biophysical Society (2000), member of National Academy of Sciences (1994)
- Ralph Vary Chamberlin (Ph.D. 1905) – prolific taxonomist, fellow of the American Association for the Advancement of Science
- T. T. Chang (M.Sc. 1954) – prominent Chinese agricultural and environmental scientist who was a recipient of the Tyler Prize for Environmental Achievement (1999) and member of the National Academy of Sciences (1994)
- Vera Charles (B.A. 1903) – pioneer USDA mycologist
- Xuemei Chen (Ph.D. 1995) – professor of plant cell and molecular biology at the University of California, Riverside; fellow of the American Association for the Advancement of Science (2011) and member of the National Academy of Sciences (2013)
- Kenneth Stewart Cole (Ph.D. 1926) – biophysicist; pioneer in the application of physical science to biology, recipient of National Medal of Science (1967); member of the National Academy of Sciences (1956)
- Anna Botsford Comstock (1885, natural history) – illustrator and naturalist
- John Henry Comstock (B.S. 1874; professor) – pioneer in entomology research and education
- Martha Constantine-Paton (Ph.D. 1976) – neuroscientist at the Massachusetts Institute of Technology; fellow of the American Academy of Arts and Sciences (2013)
- Art Cooley (B.S., M.S.) – environmentalist; co-founder of Environmental Defense Fund
- Robert Corey (Ph.D. 1924) – biochemist known for his role in discovery of the α-helix and the β-sheet, professor of structural chemistry at Caltech (1949–1968); recipient of Guggenheim Fellowship, member of the National Academy of Sciences (1970)
- Raymond B. Cowles (Ph.D. 1928) – herpetologist who studied thermal ecology of reptiles
- Roy Curtiss (B.S. 1956) – professor (1983–2005) and chairman (1983–1993) of department of biology, Washington University in St. Louis, professor of genomics, evolution, and bioinformatics at Arizona State University (2005–2015); member of the National Academy of Sciences (2001)
- Derrill M. Daniel (MS 1928, Ph.D. 1933) – assidtant professor of entomology at Cornell, US Army major general
- Jane Eleanor Datcher (B.S. 1891) – botanist and first African-American woman to earn an advanced degree from Cornell
- Mercedes Delfinado (Ph.D. 1966) – acarologist, known for her work on bee mites for USDA
- Milislav Demerec (Ph.D. 1923 genetics) – geneticist and long serving director of the Cold Spring Harbor Laboratory; member of the National Academy of Sciences (1946)
- Winfried Denk (Ph.D. 1989 physics) – director of the Max Planck Institute of Neurobiology; recipient of the Gottfried Wilhelm Leibniz Prize (2003), the Kavli Prize (2012) and the Brain Prize (2015), member of the National Academy of Sciences (2013) and of the Norwegian Academy of Science and Letters
- Keith Downey (Ph.D. 1961) – inventor of canola oil
- Benjamin Minge Duggar (Ph.D. 1898) – plant physiologist; member of the National Academy of Sciences (1927)
- Arthur Rose Eldred (B.S. 1916 agriculture) – America's first Eagle Scout (1912), agriculturalist
- Alfred E. Emerson (B.S., M.S., Ph.D.) – biologist who was professor of zoology at the University of Chicago (1929–1962) and served as president of the Ecological Society of America (1941) and of the Society of Systematic Zoology (1958); member of the National Academy of Sciences (1962)
- Sterling Howard Emerson (B.S. 1922) – professor of genetics at California Institute of Technology; member of the National Academy of Sciences (1970)
- Erwin Engst (B.S. 1941) – agricultural specialist who assisted in developing China's agriculture and social economy
- W. Hardy Eshbaugh (B.A.) – botanist, known for his research on chili peppers and the discovery and description of a new species, Capsicum tovarii; professor emeritus of Botany at Miami University; fellow of American Association for the Advancement of Science
- Alice Catherine Evans (B.S. 1909, bacteriology) – microbiologist, known for demonstrating that bacillus abortus caused Brucellosis; first female president of the Society of American Bacteriologists; Inducted into the National Women's Hall of Fame, 1993
- Howard Ensign Evans (M.S., Ph.D.) – entomologist; fellow of the National Academy of Sciences, recipient of the William J. Walker Prize of the Boston Museum of Science (1967) and the Daniel Giraud Elliot Medal from the National Academy of Sciences (1976)
- Margaret Clay Ferguson (Ph.D. 1901) – first female president of the Botanical Society of America (1929) who served as professor of botany and head of the department at Wellesley College
- Millicent S. Ficken (B.S. 1951) – ornithologist who specialized in birds' vocalizations and their social behaviors; first woman to be elected a fellow of both the American Ornithologists' Society and the Animal Behavior Society
- Adriance S. Foster (B.S. 1923) – first plant anatomist at the University of California, Berkeley, two-time recipient of a Guggenheim Fellowship and president of the Botanical Society of America (1954)
- Herbert Friedmann (Ph.D. 1923) – ornithologist at the Smithsonian Institution; member of the National Academy of Sciences (1962)
- Louis Agassiz Fuertes (B.A. 1897; lecturer 1923–?) – ornithologist and illustrator
- Douglas J. Futuyma (B.S. 1963) – evolutionary biologist and a distinguished professor of Ecology and Evolution at Stony Brook University; fellow of the American Association for the Advancement of Science (1985) and the American Academy of Arts and Sciences, member of the National Academy of Sciences (2006)
- Jorge E. Galán (Ph.D. 1986) – Lucille P. Markey Professor of Microbial Pathogenesis and Professor of Cell Biology; chair, Department of Microbial Pathogenesis at Yale University; Robert Koch Prize recipient (2011), member of the National Academy of Sciences (2012) and the National Academy of Medicine (2019)
- Arthur Galston (B.S. 1940 botany) – botanist and bioethicist; fellow of the American Academy of Arts and Sciences
- Mary Lou Guerinot (B.S. 1975 biology) – molecular geneticist at Dartmouth College; member of the National Academy of Sciences (2016)
- Irwin Gunsalus (B.A. 1933, M.A. 1937, Ph.D. 1940) – biochemist known for discovery of lipoic acid; fellow of the American Academy of Arts and Sciences and the American Academy of Microbiology, member of the National Academy of Sciences (1965), recipient of the Selman A. Waksman Award in Microbiology
- Jo Handelsman (B.S. 1979) – Howard Hughes Medical Institute Professor and Frederick Phineas Rose Professor of Molecular, Cellular and Developmental Biology at Yale; pioneer in metagenomics (a term she coined)
- Roger Härtl – neurological surgeon
- Alan Hastings (B.S. 1973, M.S. 1975, Ph.D. 1977) – theoretical ecologist at the University of California, Davis; Robert H. MacArthur Award recipient (2006), fellow of the American Academy of Arts and Sciences and member of the National Academy of Sciences (2015)
- Sheng-Yang He (Ph.D. 1991) – plant biologist at Michigan State University; member of the National Academy of Sciences (2015)
- George H. Hepting (B.S. 1929, Ph.D. 1933 forestry) – forest scientist and plant pathologist; first forester elected to the National Academy of Sciences (1969)
- Richard L. Hoffman (M.S. Entomology, 1959) – internationally recognized expert of millipedes and Appalachian natural history
- John Hopfield (Ph.D. 1958) – biophysicist and neuroscientist, known for his invention of Hopfield network; faculty member at University of California, Berkeley (physics), Princeton University (physics), California Institute of Technology (Chemistry and Biology), Howard A. Prior Professor of Molecular Biology at Princeton, president of the American Physical Society (2006); member of the National Academy of Sciences (1973), the American Philosophical Society, the American Academy of Arts and Sciences; recipient of the Oliver E. Buckley Condensed Matter Prize (1969), Harold Pender Award (2002), Dirac Medal (2002), Albert Einstein World Award of Science (2005); MacArthur Fellow (1983); Nobel laureate in Physics (2024)
- James G. Horsfall (Ph.D. 1929 plant pathology) – biologist, pathologist and agriculturist known for the discovery of organic fungicides; the National Academy of Sciences (1953)
- Romeyn Beck Hough – botanist famous for his specimens of American trees
- Leland Ossian Howard (B.S. 1877) – entomologist; member of the National Academy of Sciences (1916)
- Richard L. Huganir (Ph.D. 1982) – neuroscientist at Johns Hopkins University; member of the National Academy of Sciences (2004) and the National Academy of Medicine (2011), fellow of the American Academy of Arts and Sciences (2001) and of the American Association for the Advancement of Science (2004)
- Otto Frederick Hunziker (B.S. 1900, M.S. 1901 agriculture) – pioneer in the American and international dairy science and industry, as both an educator and a technical innovator
- André Jagendorf (B.A. 1948, faculty 1966–) – plant physiologist; member of the National Academy of Sciences (1980)
- Alison Jolly (B.A. 1955) – primatologist, pioneer in study of the lemur
- Howard Judelson (B.S.) – plant pathologist at the University of California, Riverside
- Fotis Kafatos (B.A. 1961 zoology) – biologist; founding president of the European Research Council; recipient of Robert Koch Prize (Gold, 2010), member of the National Academy of Sciences (1982) and of the European Academy of Sciences and Arts (2007), fellow of the American Academy of Arts and Sciences (1980) and of the Royal Society of London (2003)
- Mollie Katzen (attended but dropped out) – American chef, cookbook author and artist, one of the best-selling cookbook authors of all time
- William Tinsley Keeton (Ph.D. 1958) – zoologist; became a well-known and popular professor at Cornell, namesake of William Keeton House
- Peter S. Kim (A.B. 1979 chemistry) – professor of biochemistry at Stanford University (2014–present); president of Merck Research Laboratories (2003–2013); member of the National Academy of Sciences, the Institute of Medicine, the National Academy of Engineering (2016) and the American Academy of Arts and Sciences; fellow of the American Association for the Advancement of Science, the American Academy of Microbiology, the Biophysical Society
- Flemmie Pansy Kittrell (M.S. 1930, Ph.D. 1936 nutrition) – first African American to gain a Ph.D. in nutrition, first African-American woman Ph.D. from Cornell University
- Harris Lewin (B.S. 1979 animal science, M.S. 1981 animal breeding and genetics) – biologist and vice-chancellor of research at the University of California, Davis; recipient of the Wolf Prize in Agriculture (2011), member of the National Academy of Sciences (2012)
- C. C. Li (Ph.D. 1940) – Chinese-American population geneticist and human geneticist who was elected fellow of the American Association for the Advancement of Science and of the American Statistical Association, and served as president of the American Society of Human Genetics (1960)
- Jiayang Li (postdoctoral fellow 1991–1994) – botanical molecular geneticist who served as vice-president of Chinese Academy of Sciences, president of the Chinese Academy of Agricultural Sciences, and Vice Minister of Agriculture in China; member of the Chinese Academy of Sciences (2001), foreign associate of the National Academy of Sciences (2011), National Academy of Germany (2012)
- Haifan Lin (Ph.D. 1990) – Eugene Higgins Chair Professor of Cell Biology, professor of Genetics, of Obstetrics, Gynecology, and Reproductive Sciences, and of Dermatology at Yale University; member of the National Academy of Sciences (2018)
- Zachary Lippman (B.S. 2000 plant sciences) – MacArthur Fellow (2019); member of the National Academy of Sciences (2021)
- Susan Lovett (B.A. 1977) – Abraham S. and Gertrude Burg Professor of Microbiology at Brandeis University; member of the National Academy of Sciences (2021)
- Jan Low (M.S. 1985, Ph.D. 1994) – recipient of the World Food Prize (2016)
- Susan Marqusee (B.A. 1982 physics and chemistry) – Eveland Warren Endowed Chair Professor of Biochemistry, Biophysics, and Structural Biology at the University of California, Berkeley; member of the National Academy of Sciences (2016)
- A. Colin McClung (M.S. 1949 and Ph.D. 1950 soil science) – recipient of the World Food Prize (2006)
- Susan McCouch (Ph.D. 1990) – professor of plant breeding and genetics at Cornell member of the National Academy of Sciences (2018)
- L. David Mech (B.S. 1958 conservation) – wolf expert, senior research scientist for the United States Department of the Interior
- Alton Meister (M.D. 1945) – biochemist who pioneered in the study of glutathione metabolism and served as president of the American Society of Biological Chemists (1977); member of the National Academy of Sciences (1969) and fellow of the American Academy of Arts and Sciences
- Robert L. Metcalf (Ph.D. 1942) – entomologist who served as president of the Entomological Society of America (1958); member of the National Academy of Sciences (1967); fellow of the American Academy of Arts and Sciences
- Emmeline Moore (B.A. 1905, Ph.D. 1916) – pioneer biologist and fisheries scientist who was first woman to be elected as president of the American Fisheries Society (AFS); the Emmeline Moore Prize of AFS was established in her honor
- Veranus Alva Moore (B.S. 1887; professor of veterinary medicine 1896–1908, dean of Vet School, 1908–29) – bacteriologist and pathologist; president of the American Society for Microbiology (1910)
- Mary Ann Moran (M.S. 1982) – distinguished research professor of marine sciences at the University of Georgia; member of the National Academy of Sciences (2021)
- Roger Morse (B.S. 1950, M.S. 1953, Ph.D. 1955; professor) – apiculture author, teacher, researcher
- Karen E. Nelson (Ph.D.) – microbiologist, current president of the J. Craig Venter Institute (JCVI); member of the National Academy of Sciences (2017)
- John Niederhauser (B.S. 1939, Ph.D. 1943 plant pathology) – agricultural scientist known as "Mr. Potato" internationally for his contributions in potato development programs and for his innovations and achievements in providing food to the world; recipient of the World Food Prize (1990)
- Stephen J. O'Brien (Ph.D. 1971 genetics) – member of the National Academy of Sciences (2018)
- Roger Payne (Ph.D. 1961) – biologist and environmentalist, known for the discovery of whale song among humpback whales; founder and president of Ocean Alliance; MacArthur Fellow (1984)
- Erika L. Pearce (B.A. 1998 biological sciences) – professor and director of the Max Planck Institute of Immunobiology and Epigenetics in Freiburg (2015–),Gottfried Wilhelm Leibniz Prize recipient (2018)
- Catherine J. Personius – food science
- Ronald L. Phillips (postdoctoral fellow) – biologist and Regents Professor Emeritus at the University of Minnesota; recipient of the Wolf Prize in Agriculture (2006/2007); member of the National Academy of Sciences (1991)
- Nancy Potischman (Ph.D. 1989, nuritional sciences) – researcher and past director of the NIH Office of Dietary Supplements
- Hermann Rahn (Class of 1933) – environmental physiologist, president of the American Physiological Society (1963–1964); member of the American Academy of Arts and Sciences (1966) and the National Academy of Sciences (1968)
- Mila Rechcigl (B.S., M.N.S, Ph.D.) – biochemist, nutritionist, cancer researcher; past president of the Czechoslovak Society of Arts and Sciences; fellow of the American Association for the Advancement of Science (AAAS) and of the American Institute of Chemists (AIC)
- Marcus Morton Rhoades (Ph.D. 1932) – cytogeneticist; member of the National Academy of Sciences (1946)
- Lynn M. Riddiford (Ph.D. 1961) – biologist at the University of Washington; member of the National Academy of Sciences (2010)
- William Jacob Robbins (Ph.D. 1915) – botanist and physiologist, director of the New York Botanical Garden (1937–1957) and president of the Botanical Society of America (1943); member of the National Academy of Sciences (1940)
- C. Richard Robins (Ph.D. 1955) – ichthyologist, University of Miami and professor emeritus at the University of Kansas
- Gene E. Robinson (B.S. 1977, Ph.D. 1986) – entomologist and director of the Carl R. Woese Institute for Genomic Biology at the University of Illinois at Urbana–Champaign; member of the National Academy of Sciences (2005) and of the National Academy of Medicine (2018), fellow of the American Association for the Advancement of Science and of the American Academy of Arts and Sciences, Wolf Prize in Agriculture recipient (2018)
- Pamela Ronald (postdoctoral fellow 1990–1992) – plant pathologist and geneticist; member of the National Academy of Sciences (2019)
- A. Catharine Ross (M.S. 1972 nutritional science, Ph.D. 1976) – professor and occupant of Dorothy Foehr Huck Chair and department head at Pennsylvania State University; member of the National Academy of Sciences (2003)
- Marilyn J. Roossinck (postdoc) – virologist and professor emerita of virus ecology at Pennsylvania State University
- Glenn W. Salisbury (Ph.D. 1934, professor 1934–1947) – recipient of the Wolf Prize in Agriculture (1981); member of the National Academy of Sciences (1974)
- Pedro A. Sanchez (B.S. 1962, M.S. 1964, Ph.D. 1968 Soil Science) – recipient of the World Food Prize (2002), MacArthur Fellow (2003), fellow of the American Academy of Arts and Sciences, the American Association for the Advancement of Science, and member of the National Academy of Sciences (2012)
- Joseph Schlessinger (postdoctoral fellow 1974–1976) – William H. Prusoff Professor and chairman of the Department of Pharmacology at Yale School of Medicine; member of the National Academy of Sciences (2000), the American Academy of Arts and Sciences (2001), and the National Academy of Medicine (2005); recipient of the BBVA Foundation Frontiers of Knowledge Award (2014)
- William H. Schlesinger (Ph.D. 1976 Ecology and Systematics) – biogeochemist, president of Cary Institute; dean of the Environment and Earth Sciences at Duke University; president of the Ecological Society of America (2003–2004); member of the National Academy of Sciences (2003), fellow of the American Academy of Arts and Sciences, the American Geophysical Union, the American Association for the Advancement of Science (AAAS), the Ecological Society of America, and the Soil Science Society of America
- Karl Patterson Schmidt (B.A. 1916) – herpetologist; Guggenheim Fellowship recipient (1932) and member of the National Academy of Sciences (1956)
- Petra Schwille (postdoctoral fellow 1997–1999) – director of Max Planck Institute of Biochemistry (2011–); Gottfried Wilhelm Leibniz Prize recipient (2010)
- Amita Sehgal (Ph.D. 1983 cell biology and genetics) – molecular biologist and chronobiologist at the University of Pennsylvania; member of the National Academy of Sciences (2016)
- Reuben Shaw (B.S. 1993) – cancer researcher at the Salk Institute for Biological Studies and director of one of the National Cancer Institute's seven basic laboratory cancer centers in the U.S.
- Robert Shope (B.A. 1951 zoology, MD 1954) – arbovirologist who discovered hundreds of viruses and advised on emerging infectious diseases
- Florence Wells Slater (B.A. 1900 biology) – entomologist and schoolteacher
- Theobald Smith (B.Phil. 1881) – microbiologist and pathologist who discovered the causes of several infectious and parasitic diseases, and anaphylaxis; member of the National Academy of Sciences (1908)
- Philip Edward Smith (Ph.D. 1912, anatomy) – endocrinologist who demonstrated function of pituitary gland by performing hypophysectomies in rats; member of the National Academy of Sciences (1939)
- George F. Sprague (Ph.D. 1930 genetics) – geneticist who served as president of the American Society of Agronomy (1960) and was inducted into the Agricultural Research Service (ARS) Science Hall of Fame (1990); fellow of the American Association for the Advancement of Science and member of the National Academy of Sciences (1968), recipient of the Wolf Prize in Agriculture (1978)
- Lewis Stadler (graduate student 1919–1920, postdoctoral fellow 1925–1926) – geneticist; member of the National Academy of Sciences (1938)
- George Streisinger (B.S. 1950) – molecular biologist known as first person to clone a vertebrate (zebra fish); Guggenheim Fellowship recipient and member of the National Academy of Sciences (1975)
- Royal D. Suttkus (Ph.D. 1951) – ichthyologist, founder of a major research collection of fishes
- Karel Svoboda (B.A. 1988 physics) – neuroscientist at Howard Hughes Medical Institute; member of the National Academy of Sciences (2015), The Brain Prize recipient (2015)
- David W. Tank (Ph.D. 1983 physics) – Henry L. Hillman Professor in Molecular Biology at Princeton University; The Brain Prize recipient (2015); member of the National Academy of Sciences (2001)
- Stanley Temple (B.S. 1968, M.S. 1970, Ph.D. 1972) – avian ecologist
- Charles Thom (graduate assistant 1902–1904) – microbiologist and mycologist, president of the American Society for Microbiology (1940); member of the National Academy of Sciences (1937)
- James Tiedje (M.S. 1966, Ph.D. 1968) – distinguished professor and the director of the NSF Center for Microbial Ecology (CME) at Michigan State University, president of the American Society for Microbiology (2004–2005); member of the National Academy of Sciences (2003)
- William Trelease (B.S. 1880) – botanist, entomologist, explorer, writer and educator who served as the founding president of the Botanical Society of America (1894) and as president for a second time (1918); member of the National Academy of Sciences (1902)
- Jayant B. Udgaonkar (Ph.D. 1986) – molecular biologist and Shanti Swarup Bhatnagar laureate
- Douglas C. Wallace (B.S. 1968) – geneticist and evolutionary biologist at the University of Pennsylvania known for his pioneering work in using human mitochondrial DNA as a molecular marker; member of the National Academy of Sciences (1995) and recipient of Gruber Prize in Genetics (2012)
- Judith Weis (B.S. 1962 zoology) – marine biologist, professor emerita of marine biology at Rutgers University
- Susan R. Wessler (Ph.D. 1980 biochemistry) – distinguished professor of genetics at the University of California, Riverside; member of the National Academy of Sciences (1998), fellow of the American Association for the Advancement of Science and the American Academy of Arts and Sciences
- Cynthia Westcott (Ph.D. 1932, plant pathology) – plant pathologist, author, and rose expert; fellow of the American Association for the Advancement of Science
- Reed Wickner (B.A. 1962) – member of the National Academy of Sciences (2000) and of the American Academy of Arts and Sciences; fellow of the American Association for the Advancement of Science
- Robley C. Williams (B.S. 1931, Ph.D. 1935 physics) – biophysicist and virologist, known for his work in Tobacco mosaic virus; first president of the Biophysical Society; member of the National Academy of Sciences
- Arthur Winfree (Bachelor of Engineering Physics 1965) – theoretical biologist at the University of Arizona; MacArthur Fellow (1984); recipient of Norbert Wiener Prize in Applied Mathematics (2000)
- Cynthia Wolberger (B.A. 1979) – structural biologist at Johns Hopkins University School of Medicine; fellow of the American Association for the Advancement of Science, member of the American Academy of Arts and Sciences (2019) and of the National Academy of Sciences (2019)
- Mariana F. Wolfner (B.A. 1974) – Goldwin Smith Professor of molecular biology and genetics at Cornell University; National Academy of Sciences (2019)
- Albert Hazen Wright (B.A., Ph.D. 1908; professor) – herpetologist, honorary member of the International Ornithological Congress, recipient of the Eminent Ecologist Award (1955)
- Xiangzhong Yang (M.S. 1986, Ph.D. 1990) – Chinese-American biotechnology scientist and cloning pioneer; credited with creating the first cloned farm animal in the United States, a cow called "Amy"
- Virginia Zakian (A.B. 1970) – Harry C. Wiess Professor in Life Sciences at Princeton University; Fellow of the American Academy of Microbiology (1993) and of the American Association for the Advancement of Science (1992), member of the National Academy of Sciences (2018) and of the American Academy of Arts and Sciences (2019)

=== Medicine ===
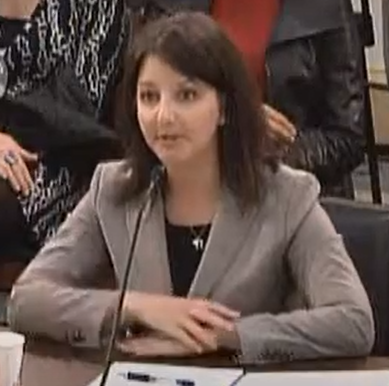
Mandy Cohen

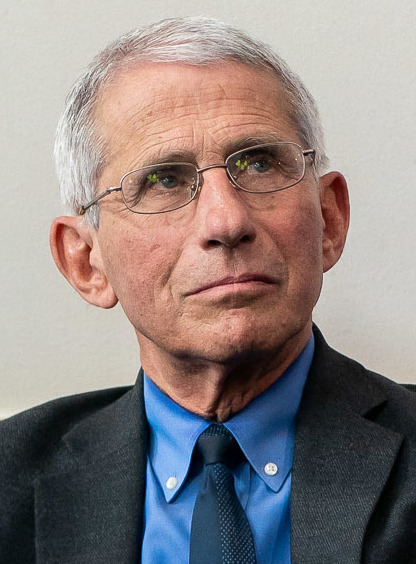
Anthony Fauci

- Adaora Adimora (B.A. 1977) – epidemiologist at the University of North Carolina School of Medicine, member of the National Academy of Medicine (2019)
- Mary Amdur (Ph.D. 1946 biochemistry) – toxicologist, public health researcher and a pioneer in air pollution toxicology
- Carol Remmer Angle – pediatrician, nephrologist, and toxicologist
- Robert Atkins (M.D. 1955) – creator of the Atkins Diet; author on health and nutrition
- Ellen S. Baker (M.D. 1978) – astronaut
- Emily Dunning Barringer (B.S. 1897) – first female ambulance surgeon in the U.S.
- Joshua B. Bederson (B.A. 1979) – Chief of Neurosurgery at Mount Sinai Medical Center in New York City; author of Treatment of Carotid Disease: A Practitioner's Manual
- Jeffrey Bluestone (Ph.D. 1980) – immunologist who served as executive vice chancellor and provost of University of California, San Francisco (2010–2015); member of the National Academy of Medicine and fellow of the American Academy of Arts and Sciences
- Lewis C. Cantley (Ph.D. 1975) – cell biologist and biochemist, known for discovery and study of the enzyme PI-3-kinase, now known to be important to understanding cancer and diabetes mellitus, and the discovery of Phosphatidylinositol (3,4,5)-trisphosphate; former professor of Systems Biology and Medicine at Harvard Medical School, currently director of the Cancer Center, Professor of Cancer Biology at Weill Cornell Medical College; member of the National Academy of Sciences (2001) and the American Academy of Arts and Sciences; recipient of numerous awards and honors including $3 million Breakthrough Prize in Life Sciences (2013), Gairdner Foundation International Award (2015), Wolf Prize in Medicine (2016)
- Francis V. Chisari (M.D. 1968) – professor emeritus at the Scripps Research Institute; member of the National Academy of Sciences (2002)
- Mandy Cohen, MD, MPH, physician, current director of the Centers for Disease Control and Prevention, former Chief Medical Officer, Centers for Medicare and Medicaid Services
- Carlos Cordon-Cardo (Ph.D. 1985) – physician and scientist known for his pioneering research in experimental pathology and molecular oncology
- John Allen Clements (M.D. 1947) – physician known for his role in the study of pulmonary surfactant; professor at the University of California, San Francisco; recipient of the Gairdner Foundation International Award (1983); member of the National Academy of Sciences (1974)
- Mary Gage Day (1884), physician, medical writer
- Park Dietz (A.B. 1970) – forensic psychiatrist and criminologist known for consulting or testifying in many of the highest profile US criminal cases including Jeffrey Dahmer, the Unabomber, the Beltway sniper attacks, and Jared Lee Loughner
- Nicole Doria-Rose (Ph.D., 1998) – biologist and chief, Humoral Immunology core, Vaccine Research Center of the National Institute of Allergy and Infectious Diseases
- Dean Edell (B.A. 1963 zoology, M.D. 1967) – physician and media personality
- Stephen Epstein (M.D. 1961) – head of Translational and Vascular Biology Research, MedStar Washington Hospital Center, and former chief of the Cardiology Branch of the NHLBI
- Anthony S. Fauci (M.D. 1966) – immunologist, known for HIV and the progression to AIDS; member of the National Academy of Sciences (1992), the American Academy of Arts and Sciences, the Institute of Medicine (Council Member), the American Philosophical Society, and the Royal Danish Academy of Sciences and Letters; recipient of Maxwell Finland Award (1989), Ernst Jung Prize (1995), National Medal of Science (2005), Lasker Award (2007), Presidential Medal of Freedom (2008), Robert Koch Prize (Gold, 2013), Gairdner Foundation International Award (2016)
- Joseph Fins (M.D. 1986) – physician and medical ethicist; member of the National Academy of Medicine (2010) and fellow of the American Academy of Arts and Sciences (2012)
- Gerald Fischbach (M.D. 1965) – neuroscientist; professor at Harvard University Medical School (1973–1981, 1990–1998) and the Washington University School of Medicine (1981–1990), vice president and dean of the health and biomedical sciences, of the faculty of medicine, and of the faculty of health sciences at Columbia University (2001–2006), director of the National Institute of Neurological Disorders and Stroke (1998–2001); member of the National Academy of Sciences, the American Academy of Arts and Sciences, and the Institute of Medicine
- Alfred Freedman (B.S. 1937) – psychiatrist who led move to destigmatize same sex orientation; former president of American Psychiatry Association
- Jeffrey M. Friedman (postgraduate fellow 1980–1981) – known for discovery of the hormone leptin and its role in regulating body weight; recipient of the Gairdner Foundation International Award (2005), Shaw Prize (2009), Albert Lasker Award for Basic Medical Research (2010), BBVA Foundation Frontiers of Knowledge Award (2012); member of the National Academy of Sciences (2001) and of the American Academy of Arts and Sciences (2013), Wolf Prize in Medicine (2019), Breakthrough Prize in Life Sciences (2020)
- Wilson Greatbatch (B.E.E. 1950) – engineer and inventor who advanced the development of early implantable pacemakers and lithium ion batteries and held more than 350 patents; member of the National Inventors Hall of Fame and of the National Academy of Engineering (1988); recipient of Lemelson–MIT Prize, Russ Prize (2001) and National Medal of Technology and Innovation (1990)
- Connie Guion (M.D. 1917) – physician and medical educator
- Henry Heimlich (B.A. 1941, M.D. 1943) – inventor of the Heimlich maneuver
- Joseph Heitman (M.D. 1992) – James B. Duke Professor and chair of the department of molecular genetics and microbiology at Duke University School of Medicine; member of the National Academy of Sciences (2021)
- Mark Hyman – chairman of the Functional Medicine Institute and founder of the UltraWellness Center
- Arthur H. Hayes Jr. (M.D. 1964) – pharmacologist; commissioner of the Food and Drug Administration (1981–1983); dean and provost of New York Medical College
- Gerald Klerman (B.A. 1950) – psychiatrist who served as chief of the US national mental health agency (1977–1980)
- Ernst Knobil (B.S. 1948, Ph.D. 1951) – endocrinologist and physiologist; recipient of the Dickson Prize (1990); member of the National Academy of Sciences (1986), the American Academy of Arts and Sciences, and the French Academy of Sciences
- Shiriki Kumanyika (Ph.D. 1978 human nutrition) – former president of the American Public Health Association, member of the National Academy of Medicine (2003)
- John F. Kurtzke (M.D. 1952) – pioneering neuroepidemiologist
- Cato T. Laurencin (Clinical Fellowship in Sports Medicine and Shoulder Surgery 1993–1994) – recipient of the National Medal of Technology and Innovation (2015); member of the National Academy of Engineering (2011)
- Beth Levine (M.D. 1986) – Charles Cameron Sprague Distinguished Chair in Biomedical Science at the University of Texas Southwestern Medical Center; member of the National Academy of Sciences (2013)
- Philip Levine (M.D. 1923) – immunohematologist; discovered the Rh factor in blood in 1939; member of the National Academy of Sciences (1966)
- Frank Lilly (Ph.D. 1965) – geneticist; fellow of the New York Academy of Sciences, the American Association for the Advancement of Science and member of the National Academy of Sciences (1983)
- Pamela Lipkin – physician, early proponent of cosmetic Botox
- Richard Lower (M.D. 1955) – pioneer of cardiac surgery; known for organ transplantation (particularly in the field of heart transplantation) and Ciclosporin
- Martha MacGuffie (1946) – pioneer female reconstructive and plastic surgeon
- Bonnie Mathieson (Ph.D. 1976) – scientist and pioneer in HIV/AIDS vaccine research at the NIH
- Robert Millman (undergrad; Saul P. Steinberg Distinguished Professor of Psychiatry and Public Health, Medical College) – drug abuse expert, former medical director for Major League Baseball
- Cecilia Mettler (Ph.D. 1938) – medical historian
- Maria New (B.A. 1950) – pediatrician; member of the National Academy of Sciences (1996)
- Irvine Page (B.A. 1921 chemistry, M.D. 1926) – physiologist at Cleveland Clinic; recipient of Albert Lasker Award (1958), Gairdner Foundation International Award (1963), member of the National Academy of Sciences (1971)
- Lt. Gen. James Peake, US Army (ret.) (M.D. 1972) – former Surgeon General of the United States Army and the U.S. states secretary of veterans affairs
- Gregory Goodwin Pincus (B.S. 1924) – co-inventor of the combined oral contraceptive pill; member of the National Academy of Sciences (1965)
- Alvin F. Poussaint (M.D. 1960) – child-rearing expert
- Jeffrey V. Ravetch (M.D. 1979) – Theresa and Eugene M. Lang Professor at the Rockefeller University; member of the National Academy of Sciences (2006); recipient of Gairdner Foundation International Award (2012) and the Wolf Prize in Medicine (2015)
- Arnold S. Relman (B.A.) – physician; editor of the New England Journal of Medicine (1977–1991); professor at Boston University School of Medicine; then Frank Wister Thomas professor of medicine and chair of the department of medicine at the University of Pennsylvania School of Medicine; finally a professor at Harvard School of Medicine
- Jacob Robbins (B.S. 1944, M.D. 1947) – endocrinologist at the National Institutes of Health
- Harry Rubin (D.V.M. 1947) – professor emeritus of Cell and Developmental Biology at the University of California, Berkeley; recipient of the Albert Lasker Award for Basic Medical Research (1964), member of the National Academy of Sciences (1978)
- Daniel Elmer Salmon (B.S. 1872, D.V.M. 1872) – namesake of salmonella; first D.V.M. in the United States
- Janet Sawicki (Ph.D. 1976, genetics) – cancer researcher
- Ida S. Scudder (M.D. 1899) – medical missionary in India; founder of Christian Medical College & Hospital, Vellore, Tamilandu
- Michael J. Sofia (B.A. chemistry) – recipient of Lasker-Debakey Award in Clinical Medical Research (2016); Sofosbuvir (a medication used to treat hepatitis C) is named in his honor
- Hee-Sup Shin (Ph.D. 1983) – Korean neuroscientist; member of the National Academy of Sciences (2009)
- Benjamin Spock (medical residency; professor of Pediatrics, Medical College, 1933–47) – Author of The Common Sense Book of Baby and Child Care, one of the best selling books of all time
- Kevin J. Tracey (neurosurgery residency, 1992) – president of the Feinstein Institute for Medical Research, neurosurgeon and immunologist who discovered the inflammatory reflex
- Owen Witte (B.S. 1971 microbiology) – physician-scientist at the University of California, Los Angeles; member of the National Academy of Sciences (1997) and of the Institute of Medicine, fellow of the American Academy of Arts and Sciences (1996)

=== Veterinary medicine ===
- Jean Holzworth (D.V.M., 1950) – pioneer in feline medicine
- Robert C. T. Lee (Ph.D. in veterinary medicine) – Chinese veterinarian and politician. Considered the "Father of Veterinary Pathology in Taiwan."
- Dr. Patricia O'Connor (D.V.M., 1939) – first female zoo veterinarian, chief animal caretaker at the Staten Island Zoo for 28 years

=== Environmental studies and environmental science ===
- Herman Bouwer (1927–2013) (Ph.D. 1955 agricultural and civil engineering and agronomy) – hydrogeologist who worked in groundwater hydrology and water resources management, and managed aquifer recharge
- James H. Brown (A.B. 1963 zoology) – ecologist and Distinguished Professor of Biology at the University of New Mexico; member of the National Academy of Sciences (2005), fellow of the American Association for the Advancement of Science (1988) and American Academy of Arts and Sciences (1995)
- Charles T. Driscoll Jr. (M.S. 1976, Ph.D. 1980 environmental engineering) – distinguished professor and university professor at Syracuse University; member of the National Academy of Engineering (2007)
- Annie Leonard (Master's in City and Regional Planning) – proponent of sustainability and a critic of excessive consumerism; executive director for Greenpeace USA (2014–)
- Daniel Sperling (B.S. 1973 environmental engineering and urban planning) – recipient of Heinz Award (2010) and Blue Planet Prize (2013)

=== NASA astronauts ===
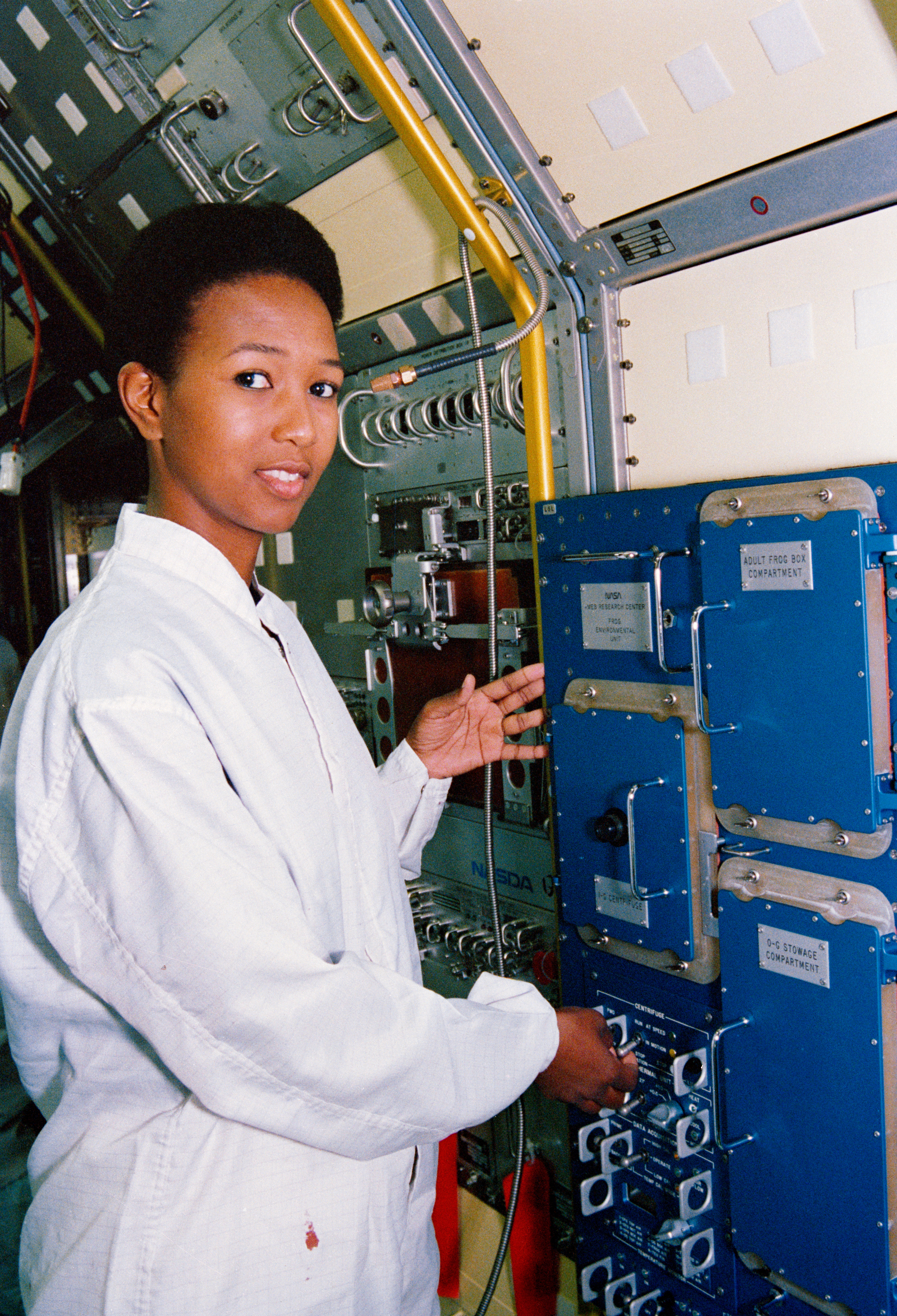
Mae Jemison

- Ellen S. Baker (M.D. 1978) – lead astronaut for Medical Issues, Johnson Space Center
- Daniel T. Barry (B.S.E.E. 1975) – astronaut, contestant on CBS reality program Survivor: Exile Island
- Jay C. Buckey, Jr. (B.S.E.E. 1977, M.D. 1981) – astronaut
- Martin J. Fettman (B.S. 1976 animal nutrition, M.S. 1980 nutrition, D.V.M 1980; Spencer T. and Ann W. Olin Lecturer 1994) – payload specialist
- Mae Jemison (M.D. 1981; A.D. White Professor-at-Large 1999–2005) – first African-American woman to travel in space; member of National Women's Hall of Fame; chemical engineer, physician, teacher
- G. David Low (B.S.M.E. 1980) – astronaut
- Edward T. Lu (B.S.E.E. 1984) – astronaut and physicist
- Donald A. Thomas (M.S. 1980 materials science, Ph.D. 1982 materials science) – astronaut

== See also ==
- List of Cornell University faculty
- List of Nobel laureates by university affiliation
- List of Quill and Dagger members
- Notable alumni of the Sphinx Head Society
