= Catherine J. Personius =

American food scientist

- Born: August 5, 1904; Elmira, New York, U.S.
- Died: October 31, 1994 (aged 90); Horseheads, New York, U.S.

Academic background
- Education: Elmira College (BS); Columbia University (MS); Cornell University (PhD)

Academic work
- Discipline: Food science
- Institutions: Elmira College; Cornell University; University of Wisconsin–Madison

Catherine J. Personius (August 5, 1904 – October 31, 1994) was an American food scientist who had a significant influence on food and nutrition research at Cornell University and herself studied the chemical properties of food products in order to understand their nutritional value. She was the first woman to serve as the coordinator of research and assistant director of the Experiment Station at Cornell.

== Early life and education ==
Personius was born in Elmira, New York. She attended Elmira College, graduating in 1925 with a degree in home economics and chemistry. She then earned her master's degree from Teachers College, Columbia University in 1928. She went on to receive her PhD in biochemistry from Cornell University in 1937.

== Career ==
Personius held a number of teaching positions over the course of her career, starting at her alma mater Elmira College as foods instructor, and then joining the faculty at Cornell University. From 1940 to 1943, she taught at the University of Wisconsin–Madison. Following that position, she returned to Cornell, where she held a number of positions until she retired in 1966.

In 1947, Personius, who was then serving as the Head of the Department of Food and Nutrition, was appointed Coordinator of Research and Assistant Director of Cornell University Agricultural Experiment Station, which is part of the Cornell University College of Agriculture and Life Sciences. She was the first woman at Cornell to told this position and she is credited with helping to developing Cornell’s Department of Food and Nutrition.

Her own research and her work to shape the research programs at Cornell focused on analyzing and understanding the physical and chemical properties of food products in order to better understand what nutritional value they provide. Her research papers were published in journals such as Food Research, Cereal Chemistry, Food Technology and Journal of Home Economics.

In the 1940s, she interviewed fellow Cornell faculty members about their research for a weekly radio program called, “What’s New in Home Economics.”

She was involved in a number of national efforts related to her research and interests, such as the Executive Committee for the Association of Public and Land-grant Universities, and the Home Economics division of the association. She also served as member of the United States Department of Agriculture Advisory Committee on Home Economics Research and as an advisory member of the New York State Nutrition Council.

== Death ==
Personius died in Horseheads, New York in 1994.
