= R. John Hansman =

American physicist

R. John Hansman (born October 13, 1954) is an American physicist currently the T. Wilson Professor of Aeronautics & Astronautics at Massachusetts Institute of Technology and an Elected Fellow of the American Institute of Aeronautics and Astronautics.

Hansman was elected a member of the National Academy of Engineering in 2013 for the development of aviation display and alerting systems for air safety.

== Publications ==
- Measurement of ice accretion using ultrasonic pulse-echo techniques
- Heat transfer on accreting ice surfaces
