= Nancy Potischman =

U.S. nutritional epidemiologist

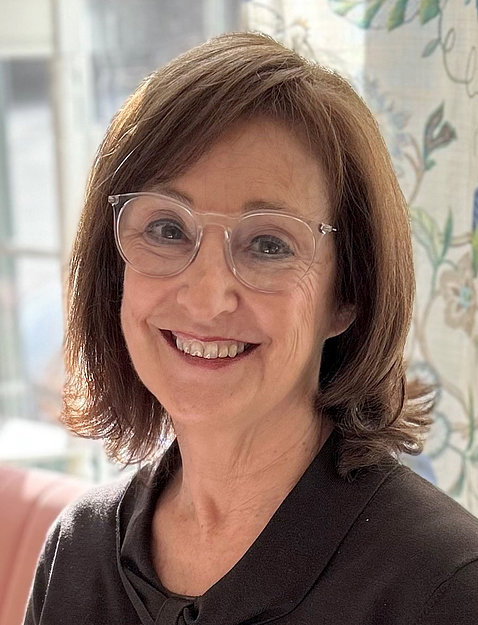
- Born: Nancy Ann Potischman; 1955 (age 70–71)
- Education: University of Massachusetts Amherst; Cornell University
- Scientific career
- Fields: Nutritional epidemiology, population studies
- Workplaces: National Institutes of Health

Nancy Ann Potischman (born 1955) is an American nutritional epidemiologist known for her research at the National Cancer Institute and the National Institutes of Health's Office of Dietary Supplements (ODS). She was director of the ODS population studies program from 2016 to 2023.

== Life ==
Potischman was born in 1955. She earned a B.S. in biochemistry from University of Massachusetts Amherst and a Ph.D. in nutritional sciences from Cornell University. Her 1989 dissertation was titled, The Associations Between Breast Cancer and Biochemical and Dietary Indicators of Nutrient Status.

Potischman joined the National Institutes of Health (NIH) as a fellow in the Cancer Epidemiology and Biostatistics Training Program in 1989. She spent 26 years working at the National Cancer Institute (NCI) on cervical, endometrial, and breast cancers. After a brief stint as an associate professor in the department of biostatistics and epidemiology at the University of Massachusetts Amherst, she returned to NCI and remained until 2015. Potischman devoted years to studying early origins of cancers and wrote several book chapters on life course epidemiology. She evaluated factors associated with differences in biomarkers for foods and hormones across populations, worked with a cognitive psychologist to update and improve the validity of the food frequency questionnaire and worked on several iterations of NCI's Automated Self-Administered Dietary Assessment Tool.

She worked on a large epidemiologic study of diet and premenopausal breast cancer that provided evidence of possible bias related to post-diagnosis influences, in particular the over-reporting of food intake by patients undergoing chemotherapy. Potischman also collaborated on an endometrial cancer study that used anthropometric data, including weight, height and body mass index, from centers across the U.S. and explored other risk factors. In addition, she collected distant-past food intake data and worked with radiation dosimetrists to measure diet-related radiation exposure following nuclear testing in the 1940s to 1960s in Kazakhstan and in the 1940s and 1950s in New Mexico.

From 2016 to April 2023, Potischman was a senior nutritional epidemiologist and as director of the population studies program in the NIH Office of Dietary Supplements (ODS). At ODS, Potischman studied dietary supplement use data among various U.S. populations. She reported, for example, that use of dietary supplements containing iodine among pregnant and lactating women and use of vitamin D and iron supplements among exclusively breastfed infants are below current recommendations, and that most older adults take multiple micronutrient and botanical supplements. After April 2023, Potischman now works part-time as a consultant on ODS projects including those focused on folate.
