= Ring Cardé =

American entomologist and writer

- Born: Ring Richard Tomlinson Cardé; September 18, 1943 (age 82); Hartford, Connecticut, U.S.
- Education: Tufts University; Cornell University
- Occupations: Entomologist, writer

Ring Richard Tomlinson Cardé (born September 18, 1943) is an American entomologist and writer. He was a distinguished professor in the department of entomology at the University of California, Riverside.

Cardé was born in Hartford, Connecticut. He attended Tufts University, earning his BS degree in biology in 1966. He also attended Cornell University, earning his MS degree in entomology in 1968 and his PhD degree in 1971. After earning his degree, he worked as a postdoctoral associate at the New York State Agricultural Experiment Station in Cornell from 1971 to 1975.

Cardé served as a professor in the department of entomology at the University of Massachusetts Amherst from 1984 to 1996. During his years as a professor, in 1989, he was named a distinguished university professor. In 1997, he was named a fellow of the American Association for the Advancement of Science. In 2012, he wrote the book A World of Insects, published by Harvard University Press, and in 2017, he was elected as a fellow of the California Academy of Sciences.
