= Howard Judelson =

American plant pathologist

- Born: Howard Seth Judelson
- Education: Cornell University; University of Wisconsin–Madison
- Occupation: Plant pathologist

Howard Seth Judelson is an American plant pathologist. He is a professor in the department of microbiology and plant pathology at the University of California, Riverside.

Judelson attended Cornell University, earning his BS degree in biochemistry. He also attended the University of Wisconsin–Madison, earning his PhD degree in molecular and cellular biology. After earning his degrees, he worked as a postdoctoral fellow at the University of California, Davis, studying the microorganism Bremia lactucae. While working at Davis, he was appointed as a research faculty member in the department of plant pathology where he studied numerous Phytophthora species.

In 2016, Judelson was named a fellow of the American Association for the Advancement of Science.
