= Meers Oppenheim =

American physicist

Meers Oppenheim (born 1962, Bethesda, Maryland) is an American physicist who is Professor of Astronomy at Boston University. His primary research interests include computational and theoretical space plasma physics, dynamics of the ionosphere and solar atmosphere, particle-wave interactions in plasmas, and the physics of meteor trails.

== Education ==
Oppenheim received his B.S. and M.Eng. in 1984 and 1990 from Cornell University's School of Applied and Engineering Physics. He then received his Ph.D. of Electrical Engineering in 1995 from Cornell's Space Plasma Physics Group.

== Career ==
Oppenheim began his career as a programmer and junior analyst at Jack Faucett Associates, Inc. in Chevy Chase, Maryland from 1980 to 1982. From 1984 to 1986, he worked as a staff physicist at the Physics International Corporation in San Leandro, California.

In 1988, Oppenheim was a research assistant at Cornell University. In 1995, he became a Max Planck Society Postdoctoral Scientist. In 1996, he became a research associate at the University of Colorado, Boulder.

In 1998, Oppenheim began working as an assistant professor of astronomy at Boston University. He became an associate professor in 2004, and in 2013, a full professor. In 2018, he became the director of graduate admissions at Boston University.

== Scientific contributions ==
Oppenheim studies space plasma physics using supercomputer simulations, theory, and data. He works on a range of research topics, including ionospheric and solar collisional plasmas, particle-wave interactions, and the physics of meteor trails. Since 2016, he has been working to incorporate the important effects of ionospheric turbulence into planetary scale simulations of the coupled magnetosphere, ionosphere and atmosphere. He has also been trying to model wave heating of the solar chromosphere. Most recently, he has also been working on understanding the effects of UV photoelectrons on the ionosphere and their observational consequences.

== Honors and awards ==
- 1988–1989: Reily scholar
- 1994: CEDAR conference honorable mention
- 1994: Spring AGU meeting outstanding student paper
- 1995–1996: Max Planck Society Fellowship
- 1996: National Research Council Fellowship
- 2001: Elected member, Union Radio Science International
- 2002–2005: Elected Vice-Chair, Union Radio Science International
- 2003–2005: Member, American Physical Science, Division of Plasma Physics, program committee
- 2006–present: Elected Chair, Union Radio Science International, U.S.A. Commission H
- 2008–2011: Elected member, CEDAR Science Steering Committee
- 2011–2014: Elected Vice-Chair, Union Radio Science International, International Commission H
- 2016: CEDAR Prize Lecturer
- 2018: Visiting Scholar and Professor, Leibniz-Institut f ̈ur Atmosph ̈arenphysik, Kuhlungsborn, Germany
- Member of the American Geophysical Union
- Member of the American Physical Society
- Member of the American Association for the Advancement of Science

== Selected publications ==
- Longley, William J.; Erickson, Philip J.; Vierinen, Juha; Oppenheim, Meers M.; Lind, Frank D.; Dimant, Yakov S. (2020). "Millstone Hill ISR Measurements of Small Aspect Angle Spectra". Journal of Geophysical Research: Space Physics. 125 (6) e2019JA027708. Bibcode:2020JGRA..12527708L. doi:10.1029/2019JA027708. hdl:10037/21121. ISSN 2169-9402. S2CID 218923931.
- Longley, William J.; Oppenheim, Meers M.; Pedatella, Nick M.; Dimant, Yakov S. (2020). "The Photoelectron-Driven Upper Hybrid Instability as the Cause of 150-km Echoes". Geophysical Research Letters. 47 (8) e2020GL087391. Bibcode:2020GeoRL..4787391L. doi:10.1029/2020GL087391. ISSN 1944-8007.
- Longley, William J.; Oppenheim, Meers M.; Dimant, Yakov S. (2019). "Nonlinear Effects of Electron-Electron Collisions on ISR Temperature Measurements". Journal of Geophysical Research: Space Physics. 124 (7): 6313–6329. Bibcode:2019JGRA..124.6313L. doi:10.1029/2019JA026753. hdl:2144/40271. ISSN 2169-9402.
- Young, Matthew A.; Oppenheim, Meers M.; Dimant, Yakov S. (2019). "Simulations of Secondary Farley-Buneman Instability Driven by a Kilometer-Scale Primary Wave: Anomalous Transport and Formation of Flat-Topped Electric Fields". Journal of Geophysical Research: Space Physics. 124 (1): 734–748. Bibcode:2019JGRA..124..734Y. doi:10.1029/2018JA026072. hdl:2144/35580. ISSN 2169-9402. S2CID 134744067.
- Wiltberger, M.; Merkin, V.; Zhang, B.; Toffoletto, F.; Oppenheim, M.; Wang, W.; Lyon, J. G.; Liu, J.; Dimant, Y.; Sitnov, M. I.; Stephens, G. K. (2017). "Effects of electrojet turbulence on a magnetosphere-ionosphere simulation of a geomagnetic storm". Journal of Geophysical Research: Space Physics. 122 (5): 5008–5027. Bibcode:2017JGRA..122.5008W. doi:10.1002/2016JA023700. hdl:2144/27910. ISSN 2169-9402. S2CID 59426194.
- Dimant, Y. S.; Oppenheim, M. M.; Fletcher, A. C. (2016-08-01). "Generation of electric fields and currents by neutral flows in weakly ionized plasmas through collisional dynamos". Physics of Plasmas. 23 (8): 084503. arXiv:1604.06314. Bibcode:2016PhPl...23h4503D. doi:10.1063/1.4961085. hdl:2144/27911. ISSN 1070-664X. S2CID 126101453.
- Oppenheim, Meers M.; Dimant, Yakov S. (2016). "Photoelectron-induced waves: A likely source of 150 km radar echoes and enhanced electron modes". Geophysical Research Letters. 43 (8): 3637–3644. Bibcode:2016GeoRL..43.3637O. doi:10.1002/2016GL068179. hdl:2144/27912. ISSN 1944-8007. S2CID 131730500.
- Oppenheim, M. M.; Dimant, Y. S. (2013). "Kinetic simulations of 3-D Farley-Buneman turbulence and anomalous electron heating". Journal of Geophysical Research: Space Physics. 118 (3): 1306–1318. Bibcode:2013JGRA..118.1306O. doi:10.1002/jgra.50196. ISSN 2169-9402.
- Dimant, Y. S.; Oppenheim, M. M. (2010-12-01). "Magnetosphere-Ionosphere Coupling: Effects of E-Region Plasma Turbulence on Ionospheric Conductances". AGU Fall Meeting Abstracts. 24: SM24B–08. Bibcode:2010AGUFMSM24B..08D.
- Vetoulis, Georgios; Oppenheim, Meers (2001-02-12). "Electrostatic Mode Excitation in Electron Holes due to Wave Bounce Resonances". Physical Review Letters. 86 (7): 1235–1238. Bibcode:2001PhRvL..86.1235V. doi:10.1103/PhysRevLett.86.1235. PMID 11178052.
