= Arthur Squires =

Chemical engineer and college professor

Arthur M. Squires (21 March 1916 – 18 May 2012) was a chemical engineer and member of the Manhattan Project. He was later on the chemical engineering faculties of the City College of New York and Virginia Tech.

He was a native of Neodesha, Kansas, and died at Blacksburg, Virginia. His first degree was from the University of Missouri; his PhD, in physical chemistry, was awarded by Cornell University.

He also wrote several books, including The Tender Ship, which defends his thesis that governments are usually incompetent managers of technology projects.

Squires's papers are held at Virginia Tech Special Collections and University Archives.
