= Lipegfilgrastim =

Pharmaceutical drug

Clinical data
- Trade names: Lonquex
- Other names: XM-22
- AHFS/Drugs.com: UK Drug Information
- Routes of administration: Subcutaneous injection
- Drug class: Immunostimulants, colony-stimulating factors
- ATC code: L03AA14 (WHO)

Legal status
- Legal status: AU: S4 (Prescription only); UK: POM (Prescription only); EU: Rx-only

Pharmacokinetic data
- Metabolism: Saturable proteolytic enzymes (not cytochrome P450 system mediated)
- Elimination half-life: 32–62 hours

Identifiers
- CAS Number: 1117844-87-7
- DrugBank: DB13200
- UNII: 4AWF0N6QV3
- KEGG: D10242
- ChEMBL: ChEMBL2105765

Chemical and physical data
- Formula: C_{866}H_{1372}N_{226}O_{258}S_{9} + PEG
- Molar mass: 39000 g·mol^{−1}

Lipegfilgrastim, sold under the brand name Lonquex, is a medication used to reduce the duration of neutropenia and the incidence of febrile neutropenia in adults. It is given by injection under the skin in the abdomen, upper arm or thigh.

The most common side effects include nausea as well as bone and muscle pain.

Lipegfilgrastim is similar to granulocyte colony stimulating factor (G‑CSF), a naturally occurring protein in the body that stimulates the production of white blood cells including neutrophils in the bone marrow. Lipegfilgrastim acts in the same way as G‑CSF, increasing the production of neutrophils and thereby helping to reduce the duration of neutropenia and the occurrence of febrile neutropenia (a sign of infection) in people receiving chemotherapy.

Lipegfilgrastim is a filgrastim biosimilar. In lipegfilgrastim, the filgrastim has been 'pegylated' (attached to polyethylene glycol). This slows down the medicine's removal from the body and allows the medicine to be given less often.

Lipegfilgrastim was authorized for medical use in the European Union in July 2013.

== Medical uses ==
Lipegfilgrastim is indicated for the reduction in the duration of neutropenia and the incidence of febrile neutropenia in adults treated with cytotoxic chemotherapy for malignancy (with the exception of chronic myeloid leukaemia and myelodysplastic syndromes).
