= Herpangina =

Mouth blisters due to infection by coxsackieviruses

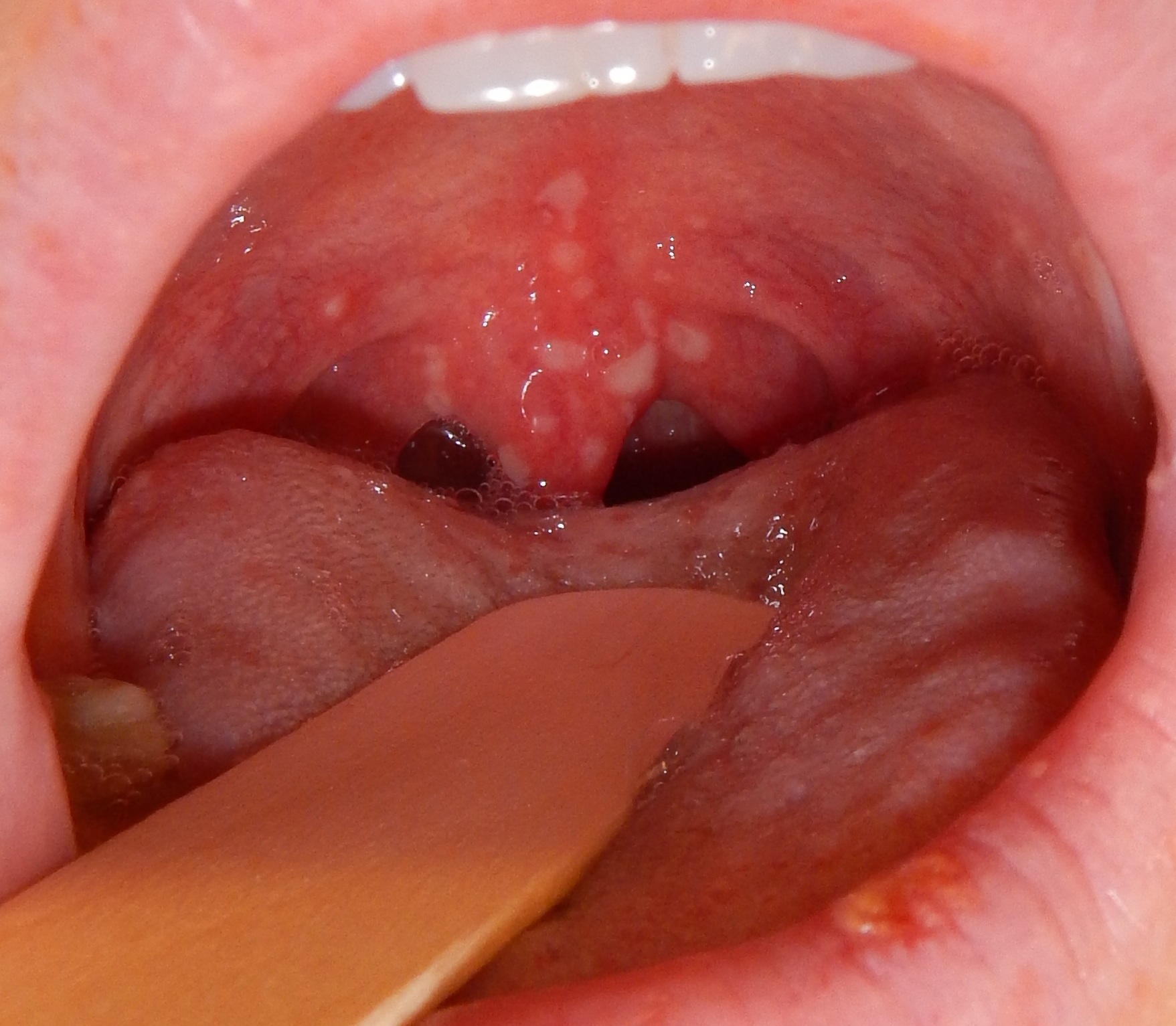
- An example of herpangina in a child
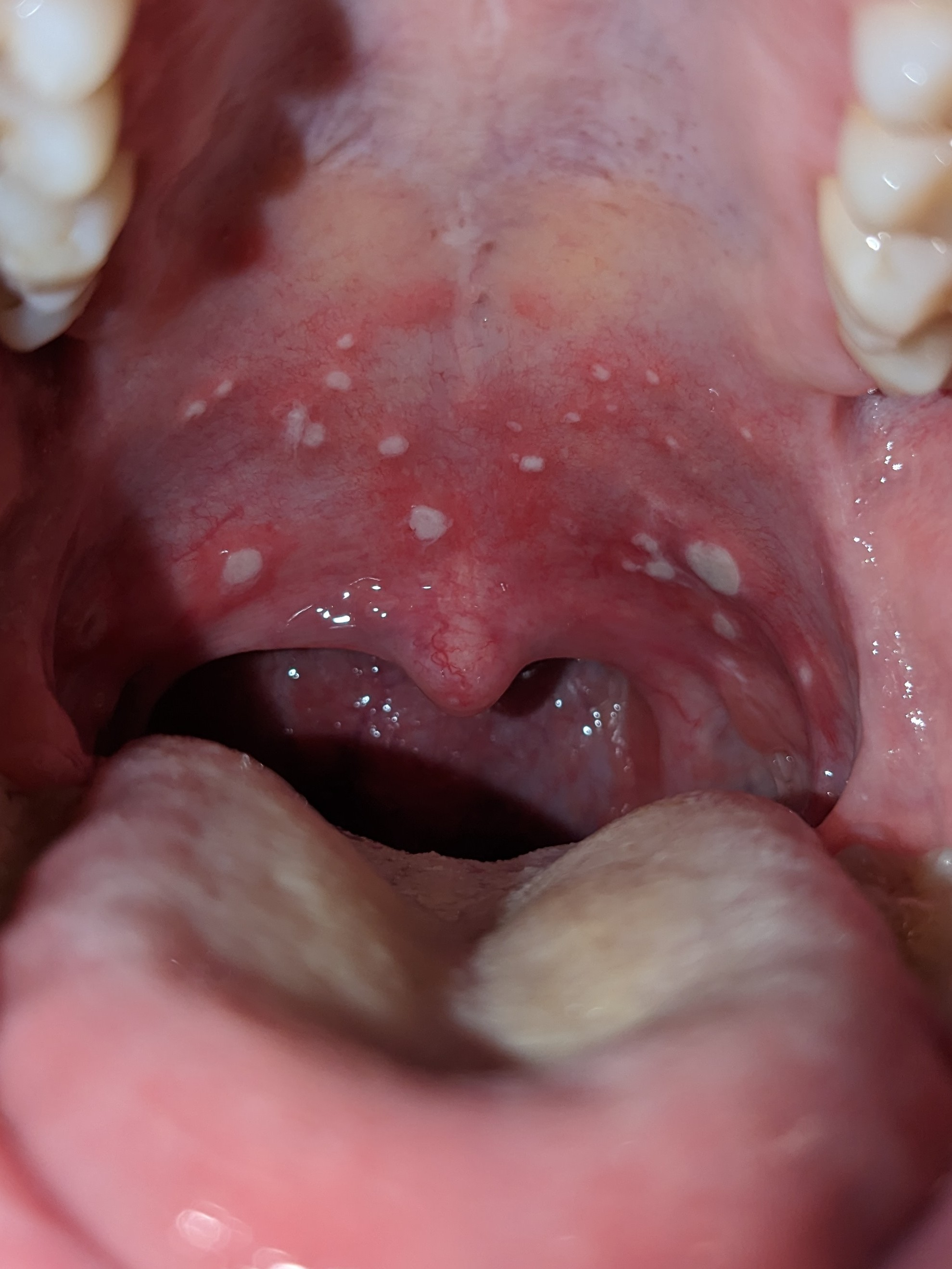
- Specialty: Infectious diseases

Herpangina, also called mouth blisters, is a painful mouth infection caused by coxsackieviruses. Usually, herpangina is produced by one particular strain of coxsackie virus A (and the term "herpangina virus" refers to coxsackievirus A), but it can also be caused by coxsackievirus B or echoviruses. Most cases of herpangina occur in the summer, affecting mostly children. However, it occasionally occurs in adolescents and adults. It was first characterized in 1920.

== Signs and symptoms ==
Symptoms include sudden fever with sore throat, headache, loss of appetite, and often neck pain. Within two days of onset, an average of four or five (but sometimes up to twenty) 1 to 2 mm diameter grayish lumps form and develop into vesicles surrounded by redness. Over the next 24 hours, these become shallow ulcers, rarely larger than 5 mm diameter that heal in one to seven days. These lesions most often appear on the tonsillar pillars (adjacent to the tonsils), but also on the soft palate, tonsils, uvula, or tongue.

A small number of lesions (usually two to six) form in the back area of the mouth, particularly the soft palate or tonsillar pillars. The lesions progress initially from red macules to vesicles and lastly to ulcerations, which can be 2–4 mm in size.

== Cause ==
Typically spreads via the fecal-oral route or via respiratory droplets.

== Diagnosis ==
A diagnosis can be made from clinical signs and symptoms, and treatment consists of minimizing the discomfort of symptoms. It can be differentiated from herpetic gingivostomatitis by the positioning of vesicles - in herpangina, they are typically found on the posterior oropharynx, as compared to gingivostomatitis where they are typically found on the anterior oropharynx and the mouth.

== Treatment ==
Treatment is usually supportive only, as the disease is self-limiting and usually runs its course in less than a week.

In children with herpangina, using peginterferon α-2b spray may lead to quicker recovery. Silver ion spray and Albinterferon may also be helpful.

== Epidemiology ==
- Most commonly affects infants and young children
- Typically occurs during the summer

== Etymology ==
The term is derived from Greek herp 'creeping, snakelike' and Latin angina 'quinsy', literally "inflammation or swelling of the throat or part of the throat, esp. tonsillitis".
