= C860H1353N227O255S9 =

The molecular formula C_{860}H_{1353}N_{227}O_{255}S_{9} (molar mass: 19240.898 g/mol) may refer to:

- Interferon alfacon-1
- Peginterferon alfa-2a
