= IFNA2 =

Mammalian protein found in Homo sapiens

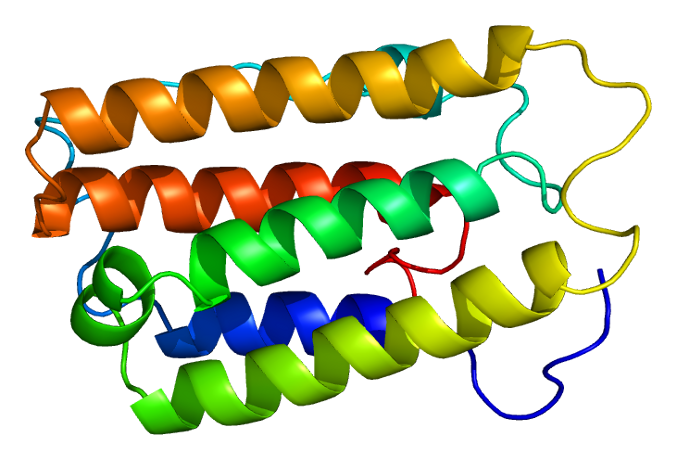

Identifiers
- Aliases: IFNA2, IFN-alphaA, IFNA, IFNA2B, INFA2, interferon, alpha 2, interferon alpha 2, IFN-alpha-2, leIF A
- External IDs: OMIM: 147562; MGI: 107666; GeneCards: IFNA2
Available structures
PDB	Ortholog search: PDBe RCSB
PDB	List of PDB id codes 1RH2, 3S9D, 1ITF, 2LAG, 4YPG, 2KZ1, 2HYM, 2LMS, 3SE3, 4Z5R

Gene location (Human)
Chr.	Chromosome 9 (human)
Band	9p21.3	Start	21,384,255 bp
Band	9p21.3	End	21,385,398 bp

Gene location (Mouse)
Chr.	Chromosome 4 (mouse)
Band	4 C4|4 42.02 cM	Start	88,601,118 bp
Band	4 C4|4 42.02 cM	End	88,602,149 bp
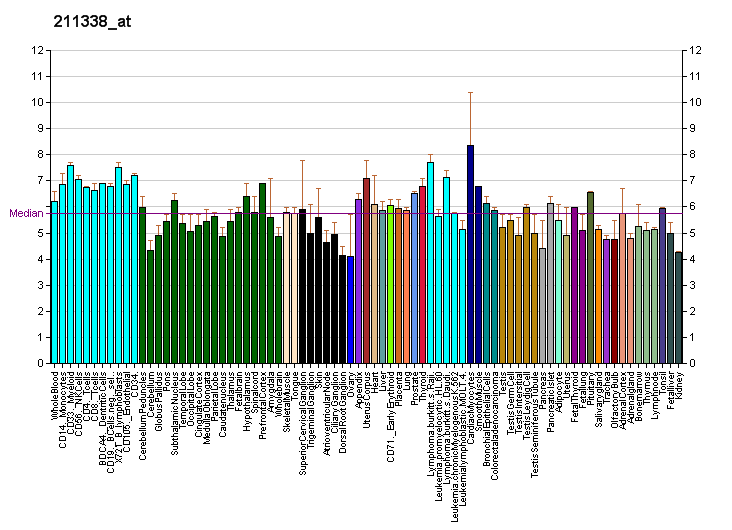
RNA expression pattern
Bgee	Human / Mouse (ortholog); Top expressed in: testicle; corpus callosum; putamen; apex of heart; Achilles tendon; hippocampus proper; caudate nucleus; temporal lobe; amygdala; mesencephalon / Top expressed in: lacrimal gland; More reference expression data
BioGPS	More reference expression data
Gene ontology
Molecular function	cytokine activity; type I interferon receptor binding; protein binding; cytokine receptor binding
Cellular component	extracellular region; extracellular space; collagen-containing extracellular matrix
Biological process	apoptotic process; defense response; negative regulation of viral entry into host cell; response to exogenous dsRNA; cell-cell signaling; negative regulation of T-helper 2 cell cytokine production; blood coagulation; positive regulation of peptidyl-serine phosphorylation of STAT protein; negative regulation of gene expression; positive regulation of transcription, DNA-templated; natural killer cell activation involved in immune response; cell surface receptor signaling pathway; B cell proliferation; humoral immune response; type I interferon signaling pathway; B cell differentiation; positive regulation of phosphorylation; inflammatory response; negative regulation of transcription, DNA-templated; negative regulation of T cell differentiation; T cell activation involved in immune response; defense response to virus; innate immune response; cytokine-mediated signaling pathway; positive regulation of tyrosine phosphorylation of STAT protein; regulation of signaling receptor activity; adaptive immune response
Sources:Amigo / QuickGO
Orthologs
Databases	NCBI: entry; OMA: entry
Species	Human	Mouse
Entrez	3440	15965
Ensembl	ENSG00000188379	ENSMUSG00000078354
UniProt	P01563	P01573
RefSeq (mRNA)	NM_000605	NM_010503
RefSeq (protein)	NP_000596	NP_034633
Location (UCSC)	Chr 9: 21.38 – 21.39 Mb	Chr 4: 88.6 – 88.6 Mb
PubMed search
- Wikidata
View/Edit Human	View/Edit Mouse

Interferon alpha-2 is a protein that in humans is encoded by the IFNA2 gene.

Human interferon alpha-2 (IFNα2) is a cytokine belonging to the family of type I IFNs. IFNα2 is a protein secreted by cells infected by a virus and acting on other cells to inhibit viral infection. The first description of IFNs as a cellular agent interfering with viral replication was made by Alick Isaacs and Jean Lindenmann in 1957. The history of this finding was recently reviewed. There are 3 types of IFNs: Interferon type I, Interferon type II and Interferon type III. The type II IFN, also called IFNγ, is produced by specific cells of the immune system. Unlike type I and type III IFNs, IFNγ has only a modest role in directly restricting viral infections. Type I and type III IFNs act similarly. However, the action of type III IFNs, also known as IFNλ, is limited to epithelial cells while type I IFNs act on all body's cells.

Type I IFNs form a family of several proteins: in humans, there are 13 α subtypes, 1 β subtype, 1 ω subtype and other less studied subtypes (κ and ε). IFNα2 was the first subtype to be characterized in the early eighties. As a result, IFNα2 was widely used in basic research to elucidate biological activities, structure and mechanism of action of type I IFNs. IFNα2 was also the first IFN to be produced by the pharmaceutical industry for use as a drug. Thereby, IFNα2 is the best known type I IFN subtype. The properties of IFNα2 are widely shared by the other type I IFNs, although subtle differences exist.

== Gene and protein ==
The gene encoding IFNα2, the IFNA2 gene, is clustered with all other type I IFN genes on chromosome 9 and as all type I IFN genes, it is devoid of intron. The open reading frame (coding sequence) of IFNA2 codes for a pre-protein of 188 amino acids with a 23 amino acid signal peptide allowing secretion of the mature protein. The mature protein is made of 165 amino acids, one less than the other human IFNα subtypes. The secondary structure of IFNα2 consists of five α-helices: A to E, from the N-terminal to the C-terminal end. Helices A, B, C and E are organized as a bundle with a long loop between the helices A and B (the A-B loop) and two disulfide bonds which connect helix E to the A-B loop and helix C to the N-terminal end. Upstream of the coding sequence is the promoter region that contains sequences that regulate the transcription of the IFNA2 gene into a messenger RNA (mRNA). IFNA2 mRNA is regulated post-transcriptionally by an AU-rich element in its three prime untranslated region (3'UTR).

Several variants, or allelic variants, have been identified in the human population. The major three are called 2a, 2b, 2c; 2b is the main allele. 2a differs from 2b by a Arg23Lys substitution (numbered relative to the mature peptide; R46K for the preprotein). 2c differs from 2b by a His34Arg (H57R) substitution. According to dbSNP, the allele frequencies for the 2A and 2C variants are 0.15% and 0.55% respectively.

== Synthesis ==
When a cell is infected by a virus, some components of the virus, mainly viral nucleic acids, are recognized by specialized cellular molecules such as RIG-I, MDA5 and some toll-like receptors (TLR). This recognition induces the activation of specific serine kinases, enzymes which activate by phosphorylation the IFN regulatory factors (IRF), IRF3 and IRF7. IRF3 and IRF7 are themselves transcription factors that translocate into the nucleus and activate the transcription of type I IFNs genes and thereby initiate the process leading to the secretion of IFN by the infected cells. The "danger" signals carried by viruses were the first IFN inducers described but it is now known that non-viral "danger" signals, such as some types of dead cells, can stimulate the synthesis of type I IFNs.

== Mechanism of action ==
Induced IFNα2 is secreted by the infected cells and acts locally as well as systemically on cells expressing a specific cell surface receptor able to bind type I IFNs. The type I IFN receptor (IFNAR) is composed of two subunits, IFNAR 1 and IFNAR 2, which are expressed by all body's cells. After binding to its receptor, type I IFNs activate multiple cellular factors that transduce the signal from the cell surface into the nucleus. The main signaling pathway activated by type I IFNs consists of a series of events:

- phosphorylation and activation of two enzymes of the Janus kinases or JAK family, TYK2 which is associated with IFNAR1 and JAK1 associated to IFNAR2;
- phosphorylation by the activated JAK kinases of key transcription factors, namely STAT1 and STAT2, members of the family Signal Transducer and Activator of Transcription (STAT protein);
- phosphorylated STAT1 and STAT2 bind IRF9 forming a complex named "IFN-Stimulated Gene Factor 3" (ISGF3). This complex translocates in the nucleus and initiates the transcription of the IFN-stimulated genes (ISGs).

ISGs encode proteins that modulate cellular functions. Following viral infection, many ISGs lead to the inhibition of the viral spread. Several ISGs inhibit viral replication in the infected cells. Other ISGs protect neighbouring uninfected cells from being infected by inhibiting viral entry. Several hundreds of ISGs are known to be activated by type I IFNs and are listed in a searchable database named interferome (http://www.interferome.org/).

== Function ==
The broad spectrum of ISGs explains the wide range of biological activity of type I IFNs. In addition to their antiviral activity, type I IFNs also inhibit the proliferation of cells and regulate the activation of the immune system.

Type I IFNs exert potent antitumor activity by several mechanisms such as:

- inhibition of the proliferation of cancer cells
- activation of the immune system which can eliminate tumor cells
- increasing the antitumor activity of other antitumoral agents (radiotherapy, chemotherapy, targeted therapies)

Type I IFNs can have detrimental effects during viral and non-viral infections (bacterial, parasitic, fungal). This is due in part by the ability of type I IFNs to polarize the immune system towards a specific type of response in order to interfere with virus infections.

When improperly regulated, IFN production or IFN-induced signalling can result in autoimmune diseases, such as systemic lupus erythematosus.

== Clinical significance ==
=== As a medication ===
Recombinant IFNα2a is known as interferon alfa 2a (Roferon-A), and 2b as interferon alfa-2b (Intron A). There are also pegylated versions: peginterferon alfa-2a, peginterferon alfa-2b.

If given orally, IFNα2 is degraded by digestive enzymes and is no longer active. Thus, IFNα2 is mainly administrated by injection essentially subcutaneous or intramuscular. Once in the blood, IFNα2 is rapidly eliminated by the kidney. Due to the short life of IFNα2 in the organism, several injections per week are required. Peginterferon alpha-2a and Peginterferon alpha-2b (polyethylene glycol linked to IFNα2) are long-lasting IFNα2 formulations, which enable a single injection per week.

Recombinant IFNα2 (α2a and α2b) has demonstrated efficiency in the treatment of patients diagnosed with some viral infections (such as chronic viral hepatitis B and hepatitis C) or some kinds of cancer (melanoma, renal cell carcinoma and various hematological malignancies). Yet, patients on therapy with IFNα2 suffer from adverse effects which often require to reduce or even stop the treatment. These adverse effects include flu-like symptoms such as chills, fever, joint and muscle pain, depression with suicidal ideation, and a reduction in the number of blood cells. Thereby, IFNα2 has been progressively replaced by better tolerated drugs, such as antiviral agents or targeted antitumor therapies. Chronic viral hepatitis C is the main indication for which IFNα2 remains widely used. Nevertheless, there is increasing evidence that endogenous type I IFNs plays a role in the induction of an immune antiviral response and that they can enhance the antitumor activity of chemotherapies, radiotherapies and some targeted therapies. Therefore, an important future goal for scientists is to modify IFNα2 in order to obtain an active molecule to be used in the clinic that does not exert adverse effects. Anecdotal evidence suggests interferon alfa 2b is effective antiviral treatment in COVID-19
