= C15H11NO3 =

The molecular formula C_{15}H_{11}NO_{3} (molar mass: 253.25 g/mol, exact mass: 253.073894 u) may refer to:

- Cridanimod
- Furegrelate
