= Poly ICLC =

Clinical data
- ATC code: L03AX08 (WHO)

Identifiers
- CAS Number: 59789-29-6
- DrugBank: DB17293
- ChemSpider: none
- UNII: 7KYP9TKT70

Poly ICLC is an immunostimulant. It is polyinosinic-polycytidylic acid (poly I:C) mixed with the stabilizers carboxymethylcellulose and polylysine. It is under trial for use in cancer.

Poly I:C is a ligand for toll like receptor-3, which usually triggers on the structurally similar double-stranded RNA present in some viruses.
