= Elapegademase =

Clinical data
- Trade names: Revcovi
- Other names: elapegademase-lvlr
- AHFS/Drugs.com: Monograph
- License data: US DailyMed: Elapegademase
- Routes of administration: Intramuscular
- ATC code: L03AX21 (WHO)

Legal status
- Legal status: US: ℞-only

Identifiers
- CAS Number: 1709806-75-6
- DrugBank: DB14712
- UNII: 9R3D3Y0UHS
- KEGG: D11017
- ChEMBL: ChEMBL3990026

Elapegademase, sold under the brand name Revcovi, is a medication for the treatment of the rare disease adenosine deaminase deficiency-SCID in children and adults.

It is a recombinant enzyme that is administered weekly by intramuscular injection.

Elapegademase may interact with PEGylated drugs.

Elapegademase-lvlr was approved by the U.S. Food and Drug Administration (FDA) in 2018. Leadiant Biosciences was awarded a priority review voucher for its development under the pediatric rare diseases program.
