= Motixafortide =

Medication

Clinical data
- Trade names: Aphexda
- Other names: BL-8040
- AHFS/Drugs.com: Monograph
- License data: US DailyMed: Motixafortide
- Routes of administration: Subcutaneous
- Drug class: Antineoplastic
- ATC code: L03AX23 (WHO)

Legal status
- Legal status: US: ℞-only

Identifiers
- CAS Number: 664334-36-5; as acetate: 2639893-42-6
- PubChem CID: 91865076
- DrugBank: DB14939
- ChemSpider: 64854351
- UNII: DA9G065962; as acetate: 3ZPX60DV8A
- KEGG: D12281; as acetate: D12282
- ChEBI: CHEBI:145536

Chemical and physical data
- Formula: C_{97}H_{144}FN_{33}O_{19}S_{2}
- Molar mass: 2159.55 g·mol^{−1}

Motixafortide, sold under the brand name Aphexda, is a medication used for the treatment of multiple myeloma. Motixafortide is a hematopoietic stem cell mobilizer and a CXCR4 antagonist. It is given by subcutaneous injection.

The most common side effects include injection site reactions, pruritus, flushing, and back pain.

Motixafortide was approved for medical use in the United States in September 2023.

== Medical uses ==
Motixafortide is indicated, in combination with filgrastim, a granulocyte-colony stimulating factor (G-CSF), to mobilize hematopoietic stem cells to the peripheral blood for collection and subsequent autologous transplantation in people with multiple myeloma.

== Adverse effects ==
Motixafortide can cause injection site reactions, anaphylactic shock, and hypersensitivity reactions. Tumor cell mobilization in people with leukemia, leukocytosis, potential for tumor cell mobilization, and embryo-fetal toxicity can also be caused by motixafortide.

== History ==
The US Food and Drug Administration (FDA) approved motixafortide based on evidence from the GENESIS study, a double-blind, placebo-controlled study, in which 122 participants with multiple myeloma, due to undergo autologous transplantation, were randomized 2:1 to receive motixafortide 1.25 mg/kg with granulocyte-colony stimulating factor (N=80) or placebo with granulocyte-colony stimulating factor (N=42) for mobilization of hematopoietic stem cells for collection and apheresis. This one trial evaluated the benefit and side effects of motixafortide in participants. The trial was conducted at 21 sites in five countries including Italy, Hungary, Germany, Spain, and the United States. There were 78 participants included in the trial from the United States, and 44 participants included from sites outside of the United States. The GENESIS trial was used to assess efficacy and safety.

== Society and culture ==
=== Names ===
Motixafortide is the international nonproprietary name.
