= C18H16N2O3 =

The molecular formula C_{18}H_{16}N_{2}O_{3} (molar mass: 308.3329 g/mol) may refer to:

- Amfonelic acid
- Citrus Red 2
- Roquinimex
