= ATC code L03 =

ATC code L03 Immunostimulants is a therapeutic subgroup of the Anatomical Therapeutic Chemical Classification System, a system of alphanumeric codes developed by the World Health Organization (WHO) for the classification of drugs and other medical products. Subgroup L03 is part of the anatomical group L Antineoplastic and immunomodulating agents.

Codes for veterinary use (ATCvet codes) can be created by placing the letter Q in front of the human ATC code: for example, QL03. ATCvet codes without corresponding human ATC codes are cited with the leading Q in the following list.
National versions of the ATC classification may include additional codes not present in this list, which follows the WHO version.

== L03A Immunostimulants ==
=== L03AA Colony stimulating factors ===
L03AA02 Filgrastim
L03AA03 Molgramostim
L03AA09 Sargramostim
L03AA10 Lenograstim
L03AA12 Ancestim
L03AA13 Pegfilgrastim
L03AA14 Lipegfilgrastim
L03AA15 Balugrastim
L03AA16 Empegfilgrastim
L03AA17 Pegteograstim
L03AA18 Efbemalenograstim alfa
L03AA19 Eflapegrastim
QL03AA90 Pegbovigrastim

=== L03AB Interferons ===
L03AB01 Interferon alfa natural
L03AB02 Interferon beta natural
L03AB03 Interferon gamma
L03AB04 Interferon alfa-2a
L03AB05 Interferon alfa-2b
L03AB06 Interferon alfa-n1
L03AB07 Interferon beta-1a
L03AB08 Interferon beta-1b
L03AB09 Interferon alfacon-1
L03AB10 Peginterferon alfa-2b
L03AB11 Peginterferon alfa-2a
L03AB12 Albinterferon alfa-2b
L03AB13 Peginterferon beta-1a
L03AB14 Cepeginterferon alfa-2b
L03AB15 Ropeginterferon alfa-2b
L03AB16 Peginterferon alfacon-2
L03AB17 Sampeginterferon beta-1a
L03AB60 Peginterferon alfa-2b, combinations
L03AB61 Peginterferon alfa-2a, combinations
QL03AB90 Interferom omega, feline origin

=== L03AC Interleukins ===
L03AC01 Aldesleukin
L03AC02 Oprelvekin
L03AC03 Nogapendekin alfa and inbakicept

=== L03AX Other immunostimulants ===
L03AX01 Lentinan
L03AX02 Roquinimex
L03AX03 BCG vaccine
L03AX04 Pegademase
L03AX05 Pidotimod
L03AX07 Poly I:C
L03AX08 Poly ICLC
L03AX09 Thymopentin
L03AX10 Immunocyanin
L03AX11 Tasonermin
L03AX12 Melanoma vaccine
L03AX13 Glatiramer acetate
L03AX14 Histamine dihydrochloride
L03AX15 Mifamurtide
L03AX16 Plerixafor
L03AX17 Sipuleucel-T
L03AX18 Cridanimod
L03AX19 Dasiprotimut-T
L03AX21 Elapegademase
L03AX22 Leniolisib
L03AX23 Motixafortide
L03AX24 Mavorixafor
L03AX25 Thymalfasin
QL03AX90 Feline interleukin-2 recombinant canarypox virus (viral vector)
