= Lenograstim =

Chemical compound

Clinical data
- Trade names: Euprotin, Granocyte, Lenobio, Neutrogin
- AHFS/Drugs.com: International Drug Names
- ATC code: L03AA10 (WHO)

Identifiers
- CAS Number: 135968-09-1
- ChemSpider: none
- UNII: 6WS4C399GB
- ECHA InfoCard: 100.207.855

Lenograstim is a recombinant granulocyte colony-stimulating factor which functions as an immunostimulator. It is developed by Chugai Pharmaceuticals under the brand name Granocyte.
