= Pidotimod =

Chemical compound

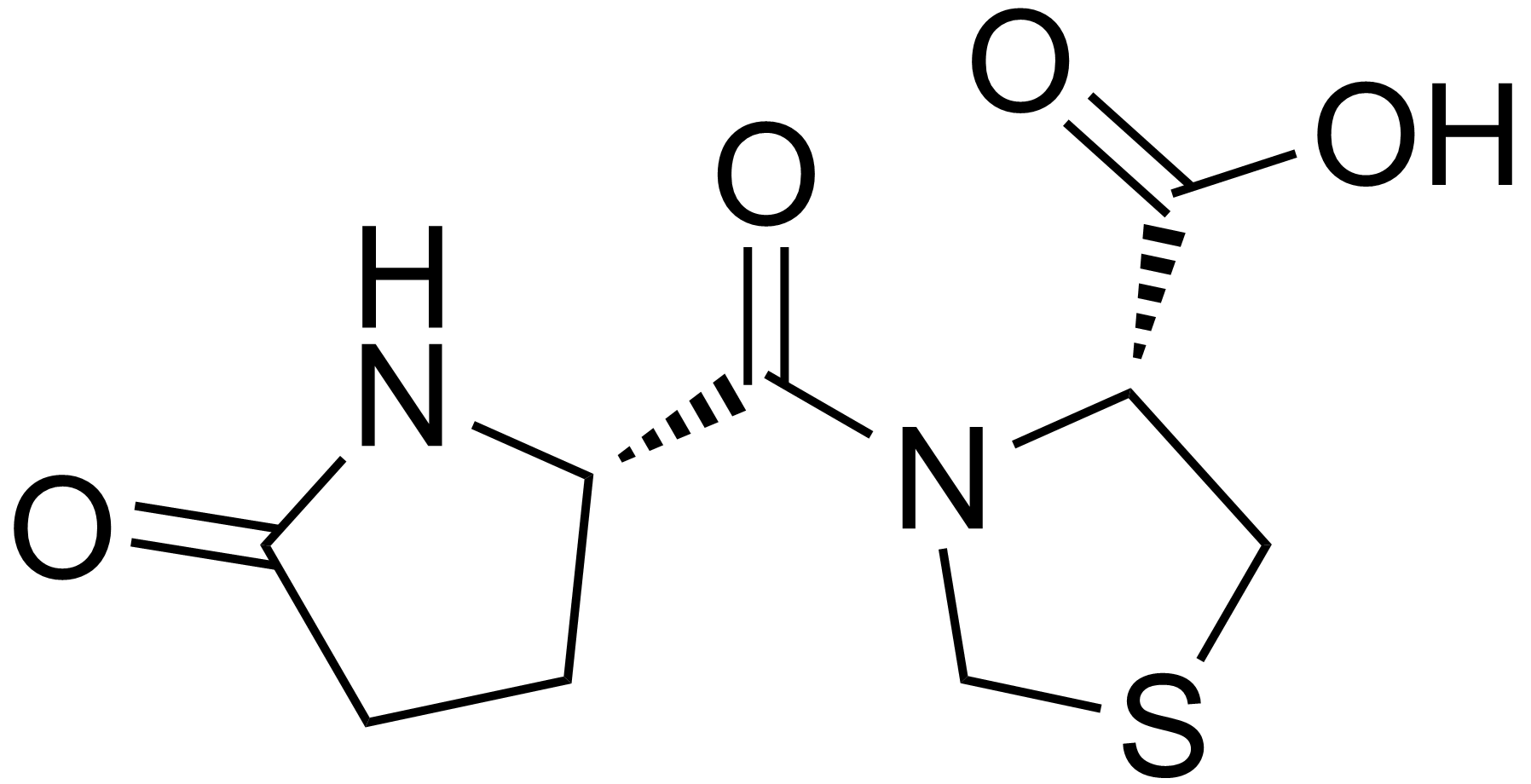

Clinical data
- Other names: (4R)-3-[(2S)-5-oxopyrrolidine-2-carbonyl]-1,3-thiazolidine-4-carboxylic acid
- AHFS/Drugs.com: International Drug Names
- ATC code: L03AX05 (WHO)

Identifiers
- IUPAC name: (4R)-3-(5-oxo-L-prolyl)-1,3-thiazolidine-4-carboxylic acid
- CAS Number: 121808-62-6
- PubChem CID: 65944
- ChemSpider: 59348
- UNII: 785363R681
- KEGG: D07261
- ChEMBL: ChEMBL1488165
- CompTox Dashboard (EPA): DTXSID0046199

Chemical and physical data
- Formula: C_{9}H_{12}N_{2}O_{4}S
- Molar mass: 244.27 g·mol^{−1}
- 3D model (JSmol): Interactive image
- SMILES: O=C(O)[C@H]2N(C(=O)[C@H]1NC(=O)CC1)CSC2
- InChI: InChI=1S/C9H12N2O4S/c12-7-2-1-5(10-7)8(13)11-4-16-3-6(11)9(14)15/h5-6H,1-4H2,(H,10,12)(H,14,15)/t5-,6-/m0/s1; Key:UUTKICFRNVKFRG-WDSKDSINSA-N

Pidotimod is an immunostimulant.
