= Albinterferon =

Chemical compound

Clinical data
- ATC code: L03AB12 (WHO) (albinterferon alfa-2b)

Identifiers
- CAS Number: 472960-22-8
- ChemSpider: none
- UNII: 4DVS4AG4DF

Chemical and physical data
- Formula: C_{3796}H_{5937}N_{1015}O_{1143}S_{50}
- Molar mass: 85685.21 g·mol^{−1}

Albinterferon (alb-IFN, trade name Albuferon) is a recombinant fusion protein drug consisting of interferon alpha (IFN-α) linked to human albumin. Conjugation to human albumin prolongs the half-life of the IFN-α to about 6 days, allowing to dose it every two to four weeks.

The drug was under investigation as an alternative to pegylated IFN-α-2a for the treatment of hepatitis C. In response to an FDA ruling, Novartis and Human Genome Sciences announced on October 5, 2010 that they will cease development of the drug. A French expert in hepatitis treatment, Dr. Yves Benhamou, member of the steering committee for a clinical trial of the drug was detained on criminal fraud charges by the F.B.I. agents on 11-01-2010 as he attended a conference in Boston because he allegedly tipped off a hedge fund manager about setbacks in the clinical trials (two participants in the trial had developed lung disease and one of them died); he had a consulting relationship with a manager of the hedge fund. The manager sold his entire stake in Human Genome Sciences before it announced the setbacks in Jan. 2008 and avoided $30 million in losses.
