= Thymopentin =

Chemical compound

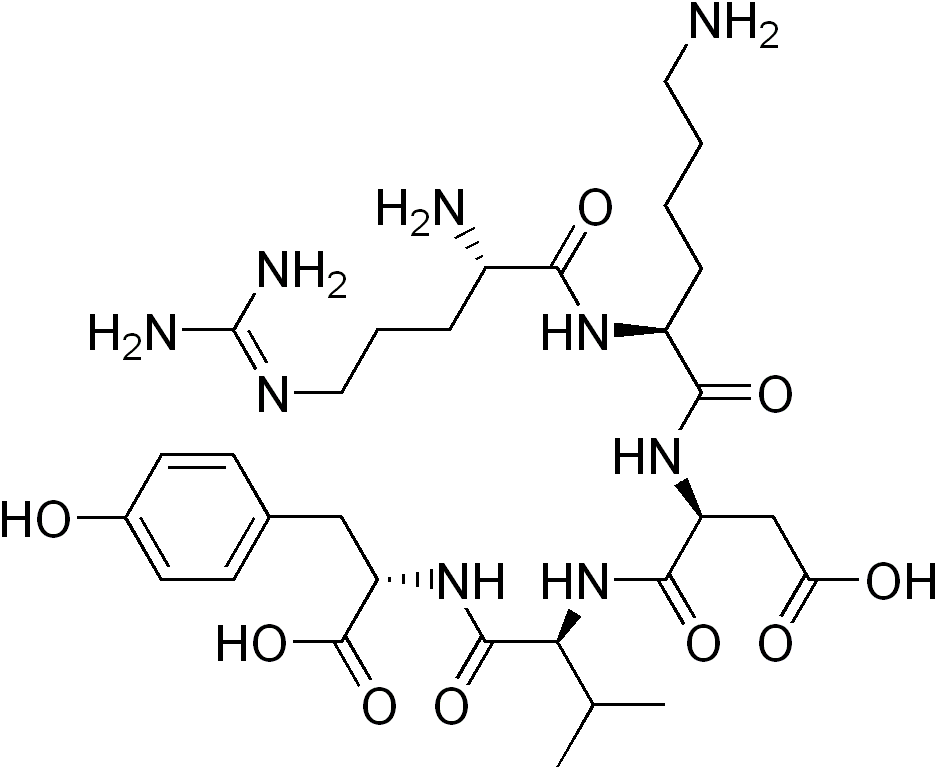

Clinical data
- Other names: L-arginyl-L-lysyl-L-α-aspartyl-L-valyl-L-tyrosine
- ATC code: L03AX09 (WHO)

Identifiers
- IUPAC name: (3S)-3-[[(2S)-6-amino-2-[[(2S)-2-amino-5-(diaminomethylideneamino)pentanoyl]amino]hexanoyl]amino]-4-[[(2S)-1-[[(2S)-1-hydroxy-3-(4-hydroxyphenyl)-1-oxopropan-2-yl]amino]-3-methyl-1-oxobutan-2-yl]amino]-4-oxobutanoic acid
- CAS Number: 69558-55-0
- PubChem CID: 451417
- ChemSpider: 397640
- UNII: O3Y80ZF13F
- KEGG: D06117
- ChEMBL: ChEMBL156025
- NIAID ChemDB: 000127
- CompTox Dashboard (EPA): DTXSID9046609
- ECHA InfoCard: 100.242.320

Chemical and physical data
- Formula: C_{30}H_{49}N_{9}O_{9}
- Molar mass: 679.776 g·mol^{−1}
- 3D model (JSmol): Interactive image
- SMILES: O=C(N[C@H](C(=O)N[C@H](C(=O)N[C@H](C(=O)N[C@H](C(=O)O)Cc1ccc(O)cc1)C(C)C)CC(=O)O)CCCCN)[C@@H](N)CCC/N=C(\N)N
- InChI: InChI=1S/C30H49N9O9/c1-16(2)24(28(46)38-22(29(47)48)14-17-8-10-18(40)11-9-17)39-27(45)21(15-23(41)42)37-26(44)20(7-3-4-12-31)36-25(43)19(32)6-5-13-35-30(33)34/h8-11,16,19-22,24,40H,3-7,12-15,31-32H2,1-2H3,(H,36,43)(H,37,44)(H,38,46)(H,39,45)(H,41,42)(H,47,48)(H4,33,34,35)/t19-,20-,21-,22-,24-/m0/s1; Key:PSWFFKRAVBDQEG-YGQNSOCVSA-N

Thymopentin is a thymic polypeptide derivative which interacts with T cells and acts as an immunostimulant. As such, it was used in several clinical studies in the early years of the AIDS pandemic (from 1983 to 1985). Thymopentin helped to improve immunological condition in some patients for a brief time under specific treatments. It has also been investigated more recently for applications in the treatment of rheumatoid arthritis, and lung cancer.

== See also ==
- Thymopoietin
