= Australian Dream (disambiguation) =

The Australian Dream is a belief in Australia of home-ownership leading to success and security.

The Australian Dream or Australian Dream may also refer to:

- The Australian Dream (1943), book of verse by Australian poet and author Ian Mudie
- Australian Dream (1986 film), an Australian comedy film directed by Jackie McKimmie
- The Australian Dream (2019 film), a documentary featuring the AFL player Adam Goodes
- Australian Dream, brand name of an analgesic cream containing histamine dihydrochloride

== See also ==
- The Dreaming, Aboriginal Australian worldview
