= Polyinosinic:polycytidylic acid =

Chemical compound

Polyinosinic:polycytidylic acid, sodium salt

Clinical data
- ATC code: L03AX07 (WHO)

Identifiers
- IUPAC name: poly[(2R,3S,4R,5R)-5-(4-amino-2-oxopyrimidin-1-yl)-3,4-dihydroxyoxolan-2-yl]methyl dihydrogen phosphate;
- CAS Number: 24939-03-5
- PubChem CID: 32744
- ChemSpider: none
- UNII: 3R630IWW5I; O84C90HH2L
- CompTox Dashboard (EPA): DTXSID90947819

Chemical and physical data
- Formula: (C_{10}H_{10}N_{4}NaO_{7}P)_{x} • (C_{9}H_{11}N_{3}NaO_{7}P)_{x}

Polyinosinic:polycytidylic acid (usually abbreviated poly I:C or poly(I:C)) is an immunostimulant. It is used in the form of its sodium salt to simulate viral infections.

Poly I:C is known to interact with toll-like receptor 3 (TLR3), which is expressed at the endosomal membrane of B-cells, macrophages and dendritic cells. Poly I:C is a kind of double-stranded RNA (dsRNA), which is present in some viruses and is a "natural" stimulant of TLR3. Thus, Poly I:C can be considered a synthetic analog of viral dsRNA and is a common tool for scientific research on the immune system.

Poly I:C has been shown to activate schizophrenia-like behavior in the offspring of pregnant mice, which can be accompanied by decreased GABAergic transmission in the dentate gyrus.

== Chemistry ==
Poly I:C is a double-stranded RNA with one strand being a polymer of inosinic acid, the other a polymer of cytidylic acid. Hypoxanthine and cytosine form Watson–Crick base pairs, although with less stability than guanine and cytosine base pairing.

== Variants ==
Optimization of physicochemical properties of poly I:C has led to generation of derivatives that have increased stability in body fluids (such as poly ICLC), or reduced toxicity through reduced stability in body fluids (such as poly I:C_{12}U).
