= Efbemalenograstim alfa =

Medication

Clinical data
- Trade names: Ryzneuta
- Other names: F-627, efbemalenograstim alfa-vuxw, benegrastim
- AHFS/Drugs.com: Monograph
- MedlinePlus: a624001
- License data: US DailyMed: Efbemalenograstim alfa
- Routes of administration: Subcutaneous
- Drug class: Immunological agent
- ATC code: L03AA18 (WHO)

Legal status
- Legal status: US: ℞-only; EU: Rx-only; Rx-only

Identifiers
- CAS Number: 2200269-79-8
- DrugBank: DB18704
- UNII: 5UPW5HJW3O
- KEGG: D11986

Efbemalenograstim alfa, sold under the brand name Ryzneuta, is a medication used to decrease the incidence of infection in chemotherapy-induced neutropenia. It is a leukocyte growth factor. It is given by subcutaneous injection.

The most common side effects of efbemalenograstim alfa are nausea, anemia, and thrombocytopenia.

Efbemalenograstim alfa is an immunostimulant/colony stimulating factor that belongs to the class of hematopoietic growth factors (granulocyte colony stimulating factor; G CSF) which increase the production and differentiation of mature and functionally active neutrophils from bone marrow precursor cells. It was approved for medical use in China in May 2023, in the United States in November 2023, and in the European Union in March 2024.

== Medical uses ==
In the US, efbemalenograstim alfa is indicated to decrease the incidence of infection, as manifested by febrile neutropenia, in adults with non-myeloid malignancies receiving myelosuppressive anti-cancer drugs associated with a clinically significant incidence of febrile neutropenia.

In the EU, efbemalenograstim alfa is indicated for the reduction in the duration of neutropenia and the incidence of febrile neutropenia in adults treated with cytotoxic chemotherapy for malignancy (with the exception of chronic myeloid leukaemia and myelodysplastic syndromes).

== Side effects ==
Efbemalenograstim alfa can cause fatal splenic rupture, acute respiratory distress syndrome, serious allergic reactions including anaphylaxis, sickle cell crises in patients with sickle cell disorders, glomerulonephritis, thrombocytopenia, capillary leak syndrome, and myelodysplastic syndrome and acute myeloid leukemia in people with breast and lung cancer.

== History ==
The US Food and Drug Administration approved efbemalenograstim alfa based on evidence from two main clinical trials, GC-627-04 and GC-627-05, in 515 participants with breast cancer receiving chemotherapy. There was one participant included in the trial from the United States, and 514 participants were included from sites outside of the United States. The trials were conducted at 52 sites in five countries including Hungary, Russia, Ukraine, Bulgaria, and the United States. The same trials (GC-627-04 and GC-627-05) were used to assess efficacy and safety.

Efbemalenograstim alfa was evaluated in two main clinical trials that were randomized and controlled. A total of 515 participants were randomized to receive efbemalenograstim alfa or placebo, or Neulasta, after receiving myelosuppressive anticancer drugs associated with a clinically significant incidence of febrile neutropenia to treat metastatic breast cancer. Both trials evaluated the benefit and side effects of efbemalenograstim alfa in participants. The benefit of efbemalenograstim alfa was based on the mean duration of severe neutropenia seen in participants after receiving either efbemalenograstim alfa or control (placebo or Neulasta).

== Society and culture ==
=== Legal status ===
It was approved for medical use in China in May 2023, in the United States in November 2023, and in the European Union in March 2024.

In January 2024, the Committee for Medicinal Products for Human Use of the European Medicines Agency adopted a positive opinion, recommending the granting of a marketing authorization for the medicinal product Ryzneuta, intended to reduce the duration of neutropenia and the incidence of febrile neutropenia due to chemotherapy. The applicant for this medicinal product is Evive Biotechnology Ireland Limited. Efbemalenograstim alfa was approved for medical use in the European Union in March 2024.
