= Nogapendekin alfa inbakicept =

Medication

Combination of
- Nogapendekin alfa: human IL-15N72D variant
- Inbakicept: interleukin-15 receptor agonist

Clinical data
- Trade names: Anktiva
- Other names: ALT-803, N-803, nogapendekin alfa inbakicept-pmln
- AHFS/Drugs.com: Monograph
- MedlinePlus: a624034
- License data: US DailyMed: Nogapendekin alfa inbakicept
- Routes of administration: Intravesical
- ATC code: L03AC03 (WHO)

Legal status
- Legal status: US: ℞-only; EU: Rx-only

Identifiers
- KEGG: D12888

Nogapendekin alfa inbakicept, sold under the brand name Anktiva, is a fixed-dose combination medication used for the treatment of bladder cancer. It is an interleukin-15 receptor agonist. It is given in combination with Bacillus Calmette-Guérin (BCG) via intravesical drug delivery. It contains nogapendekin alfa, a human IL-15(N72D) variant, which is more potent than regular IL-15; and inbakicept, an interleukin 15 receptor subunit alpha agonist.

The most common adverse reactions include increased creatinine, dysuria, hematuria, urinary frequency, micturition urgency, urinary tract infection, increased potassium, musculoskeletal pain, chills, and pyrexia.

Nogapendekin alfa inbakicept was approved for medical use in the United States in April 2024. The US Food and Drug Administration considers it to be a first-in-class medication.

== Medical uses ==
Nogapendekin alfa inbakicept is indicated with Bacillus Calmette-Guérin for adults with Bacillus Calmette-Guérin-unresponsive non-muscle invasive bladder cancer with carcinoma in situ with or without papillary tumors.

In October 2026, the indication for nogapendekin alfa inbakicept with Bacillus Calmette-Guérin was expanded to include adults with high-grade papillary-only bladder cancer that has not spread into the bladder muscle and has not responded to BCG treatment. Non-muscle invasive bladder cancer is bladder cancer that has not grown into the bladder’s muscle layer and can include carcinoma in situ and papillary tumors. Carcinoma in situ forms flat patches along the bladder’s lining, while papillary tumors grow from the lining into the bladder as small, finger-like projections. Carcinoma in situ is always high-grade, while papillary tumors can be low-grade or high-grade. High-grade cancers are more likely to grow and spread than low-grade cancers.

== History ==
Efficacy was evaluated in QUILT-3.032 (NCT03022825), a single-arm, multi-center trial of 77 participants with Bacillus Calmette-Guérin-unresponsive, high-risk non-muscle invasive bladder cancer with carcinoma in situ with or without Ta/T1 papillary disease following transurethral resection. Participants received nogapendekin alfa inbakicept induction via intravesical instillation with Bacillus Calmette-Guérin followed by maintenance therapy for up to 37 months.

== Society and culture ==
=== Legal status ===
Nogapendekin alfa inbakicept was approved for medical use in the United States in April 2024. The US Food and Drug Administration granted the application for nogapendekin alfa inbakicept breakthrough therapy designation. The approval was granted to Altor Bioscience, an indirect wholly-owned subsidiary of Immunitybio.

In December 2025, the Committee for Medicinal Products for Human Use of the European Medicines Agency adopted a positive opinion, recommending the granting of a conditional marketing authorization for the medicinal product Anktiva (nogapendekin alfa inbakicept) to treat adults with a type of bladder cancer that affects the lining of the bladder (non-muscle invasive bladder cancer) and that is at high risk of growing and spreading (carcinoma in situ, with or without papillary tumors). The applicant for this medicinal product is Serum Life Science Europe. Nogapendekin alfa inbakicept was authoried for medical use in the European Union in February 2026.
