= PEGylation =

Chemical reaction

Polyethylene glycol

PEGylation (or pegylation) is the process of both covalent and non-covalent attachment or amalgamation of polyethylene glycol (PEG, in pharmacy called macrogol) polymer chains to molecules and macrostructures, such as a drug, therapeutic protein or vesicle, which is then described as PEGylated. PEGylation affects the resulting derivatives or aggregates interactions, which typically slows down their coalescence and degradation as well as elimination in vivo. Proteins that have been PEGylated are polymer-protein conjugates.

PEGylation is routinely achieved by the incubation of a reactive derivative of PEG with the target molecule. The covalent attachment of PEG to a drug or therapeutic protein can "mask" the agent from the host's immune system (reducing immunogenicity and antigenicity), and increase its hydrodynamic size (size in solution), which prolongs its circulatory time by reducing renal clearance. PEGylation can also provide water solubility to hydrophobic drugs and proteins. Having proven its pharmacological advantages and acceptability, PEGylation technology is the foundation of a growing multibillion-dollar industry.

== Methodology ==
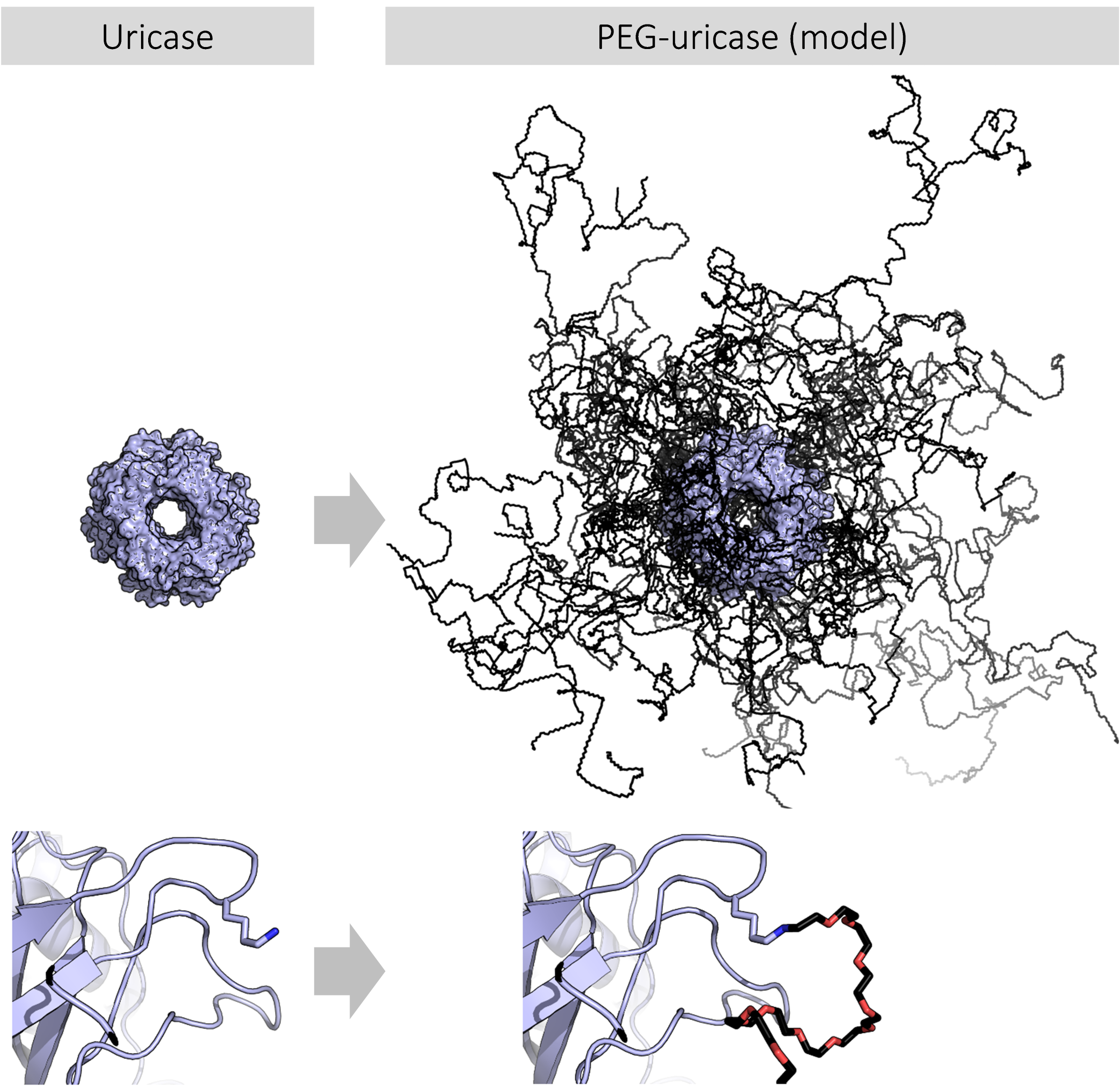
A comparison of uricase and PEG-uricase; PEG-uricase includes 40 polymers of 10kDa PEG. PEGylation improves its solubility at physiological pH, increases serum half-life and reduces immunogenicity without compromising activity. Upper images show the whole tetramer, lower images show one of the lysines that is PEGylated. (uricase from PDB: 1uox and PEG-uricase model from reference; only 36 PEG polymers included)

PEGylation is the process of attaching the strands of the polymer PEG to molecules, most typically peptides, proteins, and antibody fragments, that can improve the safety and efficiency of many therapeutics. It produces alterations in the physiochemical properties including changes in conformation, electrostatic binding, hydrophobicity etc. These physical and chemical changes increase systemic retention of the therapeutic agent. Also, it can influence the binding affinity of the therapeutic moiety to the cell receptors and can alter the absorption and distribution patterns.

PEGylation, by increasing the molecular weight of a molecule, can impart several significant pharmacological advantages over the unmodified form, such as improved drug solubility, reduced dosage frequency with potentially reduced toxicity and without diminished efficacy, extended circulating life, increased drug stability, and enhanced protection from proteolytic degradation; PEGylated forms may also be eligible for patent protection.

== PEGylated drugs ==
The attachment of an inert and hydrophilic polymer was first reported around 1970 to extend blood life and control immunogenicity of proteins. Polyethylene glycol was chosen as the polymer. In 1981 Davis and Abuchowski founded Enzon, Inc., which brought three PEGylated drugs to market. Abuchowski later founded and is CEO of Prolong Pharmaceuticals.

The clinical value of PEGylation is now well established. ADAGEN (pegademase bovine) manufactured by Enzon Pharmaceuticals, Inc., US was the first PEGylated protein approved by the U.S. Food and Drug Administration (FDA) in March 1990, to enter the market. It is used to treat a form of severe combined immunodeficiency syndrome (ADA-SCID), as an alternative to bone marrow transplantation and enzyme replacement by gene therapy. Since the introduction of ADAGEN, a large number of PEGylated protein and peptide pharmaceuticals have followed and many others are under clinical trial or under development stages. Sales of the two most successful products, Pegasys and Neulasta, exceeded $5 billion in 2011. All commercially available PEGylated pharmaceuticals contain methoxypoly(ethylene glycol) or mPEG. PEGylated pharmaceuticals on the market (in reverse chronology by FDA approval year) have included:

- A PEGylated lipid is used as an excipient in both the Moderna vaccine and the Pfizer–BioNTech COVID-19 vaccine. Both RNA vaccines consist of Messenger RNA, or mRNA, encased in a bubble of oily molecules called lipids. Proprietary lipid technology is used for each. In both vaccines, the bubbles are coated with a stabilizing molecule of polyethylene glycol. As of December 2020, there is some concern that PEG could trigger an allergic reaction, as appears to have occurred by 19 December, in at least three "Alaska health care worker" people who were administered the Pfizer–BioNTech COVID-19 vaccine. The particular PEGylated molecule in the Moderna vaccine is known as DMG-PEG 2000.
- Pegvaliase (Biomarin) – PEGylated recombinant phenylalanine ammonia-lyase for the treatment of Phenylketonuria, approved by the FDA for the US in May 2018.
- Adynovate – PEGylated Antihemophilic Factor VIII for the treatment of patients with hemophilia A. (Baxalta, 2015)
- Irinotecan liposome (Onivyde) – PEGylated liposomal irinotecan hydrochloride trihydrate for the treatment of metastatic pancreatic cancer in adults proceeding treatment with gemcitabine-based therapy. (Ipsen, 2015)
- Plegridy – PEGylated Interferon Beta-1a for the treatment of patients with relapsing forms of multiple sclerosis. (Biogen, 2014)
- Naloxegol (Movantik) – PEGylated naloxol for the treatment of opioid-induced constipation in adults patients with chronic non-cancer pain (un-pegylated methadone can cause adverse gastrointestinal reactions). (AstraZeneca, 2014)
- Peginesatide (Omontys) – once-monthly medication to treat anemia associated with chronic kidney disease in adult patients on dialysis (Affymax/Takeda Pharmaceuticals, 2012)
- Pegloticase (Krystexxa) – PEGylated uricase for the treatment of gout (Savient, 2010)
- Certolizumab pegol (Cimzia) – monoclonal antibody for treatment of moderate to severe rheumatoid arthritis and Crohn's disease, an inflammatory gastrointestinal disorder (Nektar/UCB Pharma, 2008)
- Methoxy polyethylene glycol-epoetin beta (Mircera) – PEGylated form of erythropoietin to combat anemia associated with chronic kidney disease (Roche, 2007)
- Pegaptanib (Macugen) – used to treat neovascular age-related macular degeneration (Pfizer, 2004)
- Pegfilgrastim (Neulasta) – PEGylated recombinant methionyl human granulocyte colony-stimulating factor for severe cancer chemotherapy-induced neutropenia (Amgen, 2002)
- Pegvisomant (Somavert) – PEG-human growth hormone mutein receptor antagonist for treatment of Acromegaly (Pfizer, 2002)
- Peginterferon alfa-2a (Pegasys) – PEGylated interferon alpha for use in the treatment of chronic hepatitis C and hepatitis B (Hoffmann-La Roche, 2002)
- Peginterferon alfa-2b (PegIntron) – PEGylated interferon alpha for use in the treatment of chronic hepatitis C and hepatitis B (Schering-Plough/Enzon, 2000)
- Doxorubicin HCl liposome (Doxil/Caelyx) – PEGylated liposome containing doxorubicin for the treatment of cancer (Alza, 1995)
- Pegaspargase (Oncaspar) – PEGylated L-asparaginase for the treatment of acute lymphoblastic leukemia in patients who are hypersensitive to the native unmodified form of L-asparaginase (Enzon, 1994). This drug was recently approved for front line use.
- Pegademase bovine (Adagen) – PEG-adenosine deaminase for the treatment of severe combined immunodeficiency disease (SCID) (Enzon, 1990)

=== Patent litigation ===
The PEGylated lipid nanoparticle drug delivery (LNP) system of the mRNA vaccine known as mRNA-1273 has been the subject of ongoing patent litigation with Arbutus Biopharma, from whom Moderna had previously licensed LNP technology. On 4 September 2020, Nature Biotechnology reported that Moderna had lost a key challenge in the ongoing case.

== Use in research ==
PEGylation has practical uses in biotechnology for protein delivery, cell transfection, and gene editing in non-human cells.

== Process ==
The first step of the PEGylation is the suitable functionalization of the PEG polymer at one or both ends. PEGs that are activated at each end with the same reactive moiety are known as "homobifunctional", whereas if the functional groups present are different, then the PEG derivative is referred as "heterobifunctional" or "heterofunctional". The chemically active or activated derivatives of the PEG polymer are prepared to attach the PEG to the desired molecule.

The overall PEGylation processes used to date for protein conjugation can be broadly classified into two types, namely a solution phase batch process and an on-column fed-batch process. The simple and commonly adopted batch process involves the mixing of reagents together in a suitable buffer solution, preferably at a temperature between 4 and 6 °C, followed by the separation and purification of the desired product using a suitable technique based on its physicochemical properties, including size exclusion chromatography (SEC), ion exchange chromatography (IEX), hydrophobic interaction chromatography (HIC) and membranes or aqueous two-phase systems (ATPS).

The choice of the suitable functional group for the PEG derivative is based on the type of available reactive group on the molecule that will be coupled to the PEG. For proteins, typical reactive amino acids include lysine, cysteine, histidine, arginine, aspartic acid, glutamic acid, serine, threonine and tyrosine. The N-terminal amino group and the C-terminal carboxylic acid can also be used as a site specific site by conjugation with aldehyde functional polymers.

The techniques used to form first generation PEG derivatives are generally reacting the PEG polymer with a group that is reactive with hydroxyl groups, typically anhydrides, acid chlorides, chloroformates and carbonates. In the second generation PEGylation chemistry more efficient functional groups such as aldehyde, esters, amides etc. are made available for conjugation.

As applications of PEGylation have become more and more advanced and sophisticated, there has been an increase in need for heterobifunctional PEGs for conjugation. These heterobifunctional PEGs are very useful in linking two entities, where a hydrophilic, flexible and biocompatible spacer is needed. Preferred end groups for heterobifunctional PEGs are maleimide, vinyl sulfones, pyridyl disulfide, amine, carboxylic acids and NHS esters.

Third-generation pegylation agents, where the polymer has been branched, Y-shaped or comb-shaped are available and show reduced viscosity and lack of organ accumulation. Recently also enzymatic approaches of PEGylation have been developed, thus further expanding the conjugation tools. PEG-protein conjugates obtained by enzymatic methods are already in clinical use, for example: Lipegfilgrastim, Rebinyn, Esperoct.

== Limitations ==
Unpredictability in clearance times for PEGylated compounds may lead to the accumulation of large-molecular-weight compounds in the liver leading to inclusion bodies with no known toxicologic consequences. Furthermore, alteration in the chain length may lead to unexpected clearance times in vivo. Moreover, the experimental conditions of PEGylation reaction (i.e. pH, temperature, reaction time, overall cost of the process and molar ratio between PEG derivative and peptide) also have an impact on the stability of the final PEGylated products. To overcome the above-mentioned limitations different strategies such as changing the size (Mw), the number, the location and the type of linkage of PEG molecule were offered by several researchers. Conjugation to biodegradable polysaccharides, which is a promising alternative to PEGylation, is another way to solve the biodegradability issue of PEG.

== See also ==
- Cytochrome c
- Interferon
- Matrix-assisted laser desorption/ionization
- Proteomics
- Solid lipid nanoparticles
- Polyoxazolines
