= Roland Mertelsmann =

German medical expert

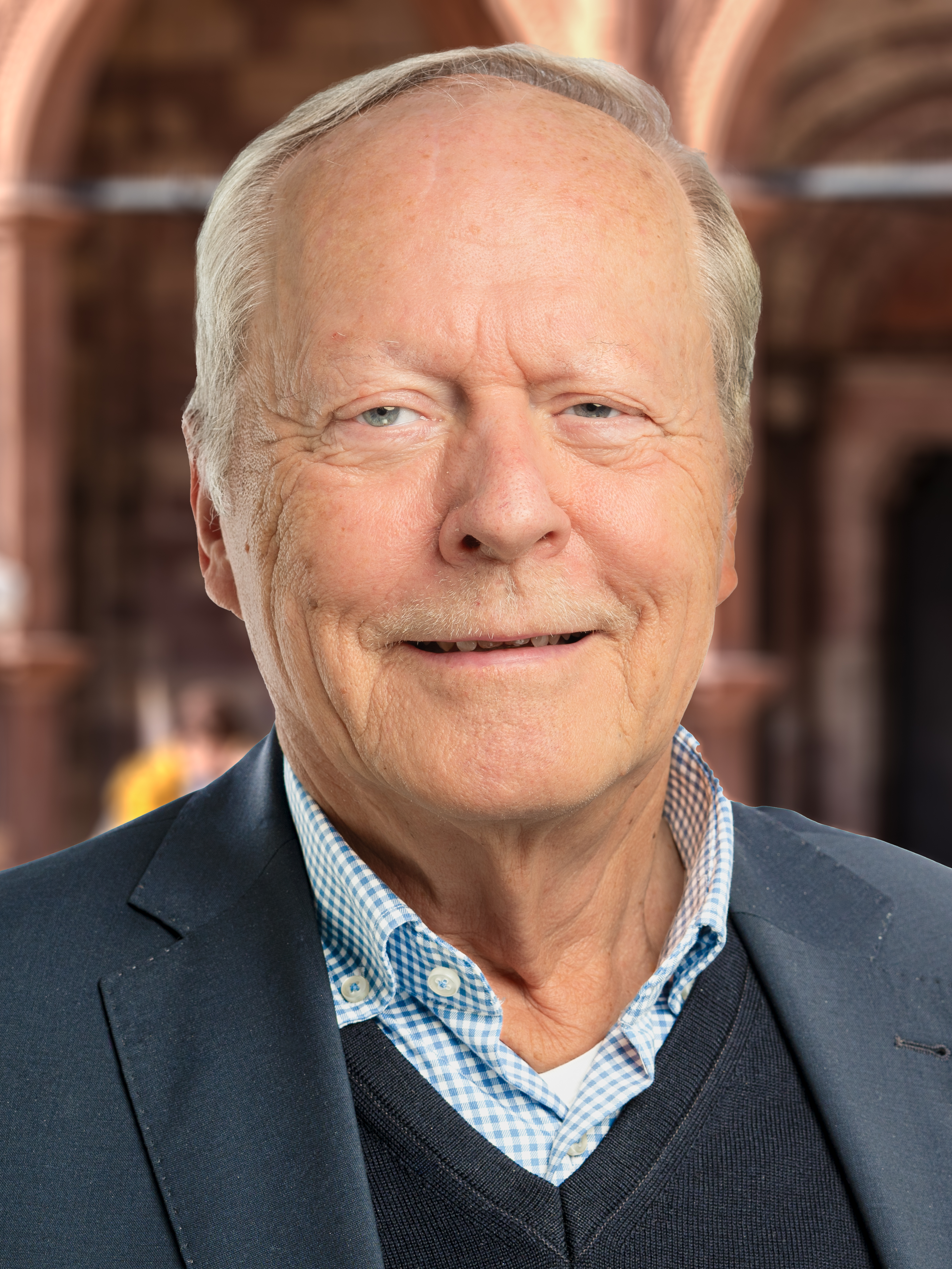
- Prof. Roland Mertelsmann (2024)
- Born: 5 October 1944 (age 81); Hameln, Germany
- Known for: Hematology, oncology, gene therapy, stem cell transplantation
- Scientific career
- Fields: Oncology, hematology
- Workplaces: University of Freiburg

Roland Mertelsmann is a hematologist, oncologist and professor emeritus at the University Medical Center Freiburg, Department of Oncology, Hematology and Stem Cell Transplantation in Freiburg im Breisgau, Germany. Mertelsmann is known for his scientific works in the fields of hematology, oncology, gene therapy and stem cell transplantation.

== Biography ==
Mertelsmann studied medicine at the University of Göttingen 1966–68. He was a doctoral candidate at the Max Planck Institute for Experimental Medicine at Heinrich Matthaei in Göttingen 1966–68.

He continued his medical education at the School of Medicine King's College London and at the Columbia-Presbyterian Medical Center, New York 1968–78.

After graduating from Hamburg University Medical School and receiving his MD degree, he became Research Fellow at the Department of Developmental Hematopoiesis and received a special fellowship in Hematology and Clinical Oncology at Memorial Sloan-Kettering Cancer Center (MSKCC) from 1976 to 78. From 1978 to 86 he was clinical assistant physician at MSKCC, then assistant attending physician and associate attending physician at the Memorial Hospital of Sloan-Kettering Cancer Center.

He was promoted from assistant professor of medicine to associate professor of medicine at Cornell University, New York. In 1985, he returned to Germany and was appointed professor and head of the 3rd Medical Clinic Hematology and Oncology at the University of Mainz, Germany, University Medical Center. 1989 he accepted a professorship at the University of Freiburg. At Freiburg University Medical Center he became the director of the Department for Medicine I, Oncology, Hematology and Stem Cell Transplantation.

Mertelsmann was involved in a scientific misconduct affair in 1997. The complaint focussed on the falsification of laboratory data. An investigation commission did not prove the active participation of Mertelsmann.

In 2008 he founded the International Master/PhD Program in Biomedical Sciences (IMBS), a postgraduate initiative jointly run by the University of Buenos Aires in Argentina and the University of Freiburg in Germany.

Mertelsmann retired in 2012.

In 2014 he initiated the foundation of the Journal of Science, Humanities and Arts (JOSHA), a diamond open access interdisciplinary journal. Mertelsmann published more than 400 articles in medical journals.

== Scientific contributions ==
=== Molecular and cellular mechanisms of malignancy- First description of a human RNA polymerase ===
After discovery of the genetic code by Heinrich Matthaei and Marshall Nirenberg (1962), Mertelsmann began his research for his medical doctorate as a medical student in Heinrich Matthaei's Laboratory at the Max-Planck-Institute for experimental Medicine in Göttingen, Germany, demonstrating and characterizing for the first time a human RNA-Polymerase.

=== Studies of the Pathophysiology and Molecular Biology of Cancer Cells ===
The "Plasticity" of hematopoietic stem cells (HSC) was studied with Alexandros Spyridonidis in patients after allogeneic bone marrow transplantation. Molecular mechanisms of B-cell neoplasias were investigated together with Binder, Trepel and Dierks, the pathogenic significance of granulocytes in Graft-versus-host disease with Zeiser and his colleagues.

=== Clinical Significance of the Leukemia Phenotype ===
Mertelsmann carried out an analysis of all patients with acute myeloid leukemia (AML) treated at MSKCC, defining the prognostic and predictive parameters of cell cytology, cell growth in vitro and enzymatic markers. By using all techniques available at the time for phenotypic characterization of leukemia cells, he was successful in discovering subentities of acute leukemias.

=== New therapeutic Modalities ===
In Cooperation with Karl Welte and his colleagues at MSKCC, the purification and molecular and biological characterization of cytokines were the focus of his work in the following years at MSKCC. Interleukin-2 as well as G-CSF were purified to homogeneity, First translational and clinical studies of cytokines followed. Since experiments in murine models demonstrated that local production by gene transduced cells produced a stronger and more specific immune response than a systemic application, e.g. of Interleukin-2, this strategy was also pursued by his group in Phase I clinical trials.

=== Clinical Studies ===
In clinical trials for patients with leukemias and lymphomas at the MSKCC and in German and European clinical trial groups, new therapeutic concepts were studied including chemotherapies alongside new strategies. For some rare cancers, the use of rapidly recycling classic chemotherapy combinations followed by immediate High Dose Chemotherapy with HSC transplantation led to long term remission which had not been seen with other therapies.

== Academic memberships ==
Mertelsmann is or was member of many international scientific organizations or journals, among them many years at the journals European Journal of Cancer and Annals of Hematology. He is a foundation member of the Comprehensive Cancer Center Freiburg (CCCF), Initiator and director of the International Biomedical Exchange Program (IMEP), and founder of the ARGER-Foundation.

Other select memberships:

- 1979 American Society for Clinical Oncology
- 1979 American Society for Hematology
- 1979 American Association for Cancer Research
- 1979 New York Academy of Sciences
- 1990 European Society of Medical Oncology
- 1993 Royal Society of Medicine
- 1997 International Society for Hematotherapy and Graft Engineering
- 1998 American Society for Gene Therapy

== Awards ==
- 1976 Konjetzny Prize for Cancer Research
- 1980 Vincenz Czerny Award for Cancer Research (DGHO)
- 1982 Boyer Award for Clinical Investigation (MSKCC)
- 1985 Warner Award for Cancer Research (Warner Foundation)
- 1990 Hamilton-Farley Award (ESMO)
- 2000 Excellency Award, 13th International Symposium, Molecular Biology of Hematopoiesis, New York City
- 2005 Professor honoris causa, Universidad del Salvador, Buenos Aires, Argentinien
- 2007 Doctor honoris causa, university "Gr. T. Popa", Iasi, Rumänien
- 2008 Professor honoris causa, Universidad de Buenos Aires (UBA), Buenos Aires, Argentinien
- 2011 Doctor honoris causa, Universidad de Buenos Aires (UBA), Buenos Aires, Argentina

== Publications ==
Articles in journals

- Publication list ResearchGate
- PubMed Publication list

Books (selection)

- Das Blaue Buch: Chemotherapie-Manual Hämatologie und Internistische Onkologie. 5. Auflage. Springer Medizin, Berlin 2014, ISBN 978-3-642-41740-5.
- Das Rote Buch: Hämatologie und Internistische Onkologie. 5., überarb. und erw. Auflage. ecomed Medizin, Heidelberg 2014, ISBN 978-3-609-51217-4.
- mit Monika Engelhardt: Perspektiven einer zukünftigen Medizin und eines sich wandelnden Arztbildes. Rombach 2008, ISBN 978-3-7930-5038-4.
- Leukämien und maligne Lymphome. Thieme, Stuttgart 1981.
- mit Monika Engelhardt, Dietmar P. Berger und Philippe Moreau (eds.): Précis d'hématologie et d'oncologie. Springer, Paris 2011, ISBN 978-2-287-99341-1.

== See also ==
Roland Mertelsmann in:

- Interleukin 2
- Rituximab
- Granulocyte colony-stimulating factor
- Chang Yi Wang
