= Linomide =

Chemical compound

Clinical data
- ATC code: L03AX02 (WHO)

Pharmacokinetic data
- Elimination half-life: 26-42 hours

Identifiers
- IUPAC name: 4-hydroxy-N,1-dimethyl-2-oxo-N- phenyl-1,2-dihydroquinoline-3-carboxamide
- CAS Number: 84088-42-6
- PubChem CID: 54676478
- DrugBank: DB11366
- ChemSpider: 10619239
- UNII: 372T2944C0
- KEGG: D05756
- ChEBI: CHEBI:92056
- ChEMBL: ChEMBL11672
- CompTox Dashboard (EPA): DTXSID4045680
- ECHA InfoCard: 100.163.758

Chemical and physical data
- Formula: C_{18}H_{16}N_{2}O_{3}
- Molar mass: 308.337 g·mol^{−1}
- 3D model (JSmol): Interactive image
- SMILES: CN1C2=CC=CC=C2C(=C(C1=O)C(=O)N(C)C3=CC=CC=C3)O
- InChI: InChI=1S/C18H16N2O3/c1-19(12-8-4-3-5-9-12)17(22)15-16(21)13-10-6-7-11-14(13)20(2)18(15)23/h3-11,21H,1-2H3; Key:SGOOQMRIPALTEL-UHFFFAOYSA-N

Linomide (Roquinimex) is a quinoline derivative immunostimulant which increases NK cell activity and macrophage cytotoxicity. It also inhibits angiogenesis and reduces the secretion of TNF alpha.

Linomide has been investigated as a treatment for some cancers (including as adjuvant therapy after bone marrow transplantation in acute leukemia) and autoimmune diseases, such as multiple sclerosis and recent-onset type I diabetes. Several trials have been terminated due to serious cardiovascular toxicity.

== Synthesis ==
Linomide synthesis:

Ethyl 2-(methylamino)benzoate is condensed with ethyl malonate. Amine-ester interchange of that compound with N-methylaniline results in formation of the amide linomide.
