= Ancestim =

Clinical data
- AHFS/Drugs.com: International Drug Names
- Routes of administration: s.c. injection only, premedication with H1 and H2 antihistamines and beta-receptor agonists for bronchodilation
- ATC code: L03AA12 (WHO)

Pharmacokinetic data
- Elimination half-life: 2.5 h
- Excretion: renal: 90%

Identifiers
- CAS Number: 163545-26-4
- ChemSpider: none
- UNII: PYB4Q6JG41
- KEGG: D02937

Ancestim is a recombinant methionyl human stem cell factor, branded by Amgen as StemGen. It was developed by Amgen and sold to Biovitrium, now Swedish Orphan Biovitrum, in December, 2008.

It is a 166 amino acid protein produced by E. coli bacteria into which a gene has been inserted for soluble human stem cell factor. It has a monomeric molecular weight of approximately 18,500 daltons and normally exists as a noncovalently associated dimer. The protein has an amino acid sequence that is identical to the natural sequence predicted from human DNA sequence analysis, except for the addition of an N-terminal methionine retained after expression in E. coli. Because Ancestim is produced in E. coli, it is nonglycosylated. Ancestim is supplied as a sterile, white, preservative-free, lyophilised powder for reconstitution and administration as a subcutaneous (SC) injection and is indicated for use in combination with filgrastim for mobilizing peripheral hematopoietic stem cells for later transplantation in certain cancer patients.
