= Mutein =

Protein with an altered amino acid sequence

A mutein is a mutant protein, with an altered amino acid sequence that differs from that of the original wild-type protein. The word is a portmanteau of mutate + protein. A mutein can also be imagined as a protein that results from the translation of a mutated nucleic acid sequence.
