= Interferon alfacon-1 =

Pharmaceutical drug

Clinical data
- Routes of administration: Parenteral
- ATC code: L03AB09 (WHO)

Legal status
- Legal status: US: ℞-only

Identifiers
- CAS Number: 118390-30-0
- DrugBank: DB00069
- ChemSpider: none
- UNII: 56588OP40D
- CompTox Dashboard (EPA): DTXSID4040507

Chemical and physical data
- Formula: C_{860}H_{1353}N_{227}O_{255}S_{9}
- Molar mass: 19241.16 g·mol^{−1}

Interferon alfacon-1 is a interferon drug that is used to treat hepatitis C infections.

== Medical uses ==
In chronic hepatitis C, multiple phase II and III trials showed that subcutaneous interferon alfacon-1 produces dose-dependent reductions in serum HCV RNA, improves liver enzyme levels and histology, and yields sustained virologic responses broadly comparable to, and in some settings greater than those achieved with standard interferon-α. In Japanese patients, Advaferon (interferon alfacon-1) demonstrated predictable pharmacokinetics, acceptable tolerability, and clinically meaningful antiviral efficacy, supporting its use as an alternative to conventional interferon-α preparations.

Interferon alfacon-1 has also been evaluated for the treatment hairy cell leukemia, melanoma, and AIDS-related Kaposi's sarcoma, but has not been approved for these indications.

== Side effects ==
As a rationally designed interferon with higher specific antiviral activity, alfacon-1 has a safety profile consistent with expected interferon-related adverse effects (flu-like symptoms, cytopenias, neuropsychiatric effects and autoimmune phenomena), but lacks unique dose-limiting toxicities. It was a useful, though now largely superseded by direct‑acting antivirals that target HCV proteins NS3, NS4A, NS5A and NS5B.

== Mechanism of action ==
Interferon alfacon-1 is a synthetic “consensus” type I interferon engineered by aligning multiple human interferon-α subtypes and selecting the most common amino acids at each position. The resulting 166-amino-acid protein exhibits enhanced in vitro antiviral activity compared with several native interferon-α molecules. It binds the type I interferon receptor and activates JAK-STAT signaling, inducing numerous interferon-stimulated genes that mediate antiviral, antiproliferative and immunomodulatory effects. These actions translate clinically into inhibition of hepatitis C virus replication and modulation of hepatic immune responses.
