= G-CSF factor stem-loop destabilising element =

RNA element

G-CSF factor stem-loop destabilising element (SLDE)
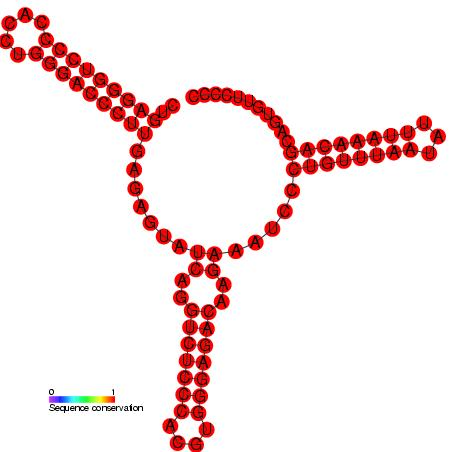
- Predicted secondary structure and sequence conservation of G-CSF_SLDE

Identifiers
- Symbol: G-CSF_SLDE
- Rfam: RF00183

Other data
- RNA type: Cis-reg
- Domain(s): Eukaryota
- SO: SO:0000233
- PDB structures: PDBe

The G-CSF factor stem-loop destabilising element (SLDE) is an RNA element secreted by fibroblasts and endothelial cells in response to the inflammatory mediators interleukin-1 (IL-1) and tumour necrosis factor-alpha and by activated macrophages. The synthesis of G-CSF is regulated both transcriptionally and through control of mRNA stability. In unstimulated cells G-CSF mRNA is unstable but becomes stabilised in response to IL-1 or tumour necrosis factor alpha, and also in the case of monocytes and macrophages, in response to lipopolysaccharide. It is likely that the presence of the SLDE in the G-CSF mRNA contributes to the specificity of regulation of G-CSF mRNA and enhances the rate of shortening of the poly(A) tail.

Adenylate uridylate-rich elements (AUREs) are present in other cytokine mRNAs, but the SLDE is the most important element that stabilizes G-CSF mRNA in response to IL-1 or tumor necrosis factor- alpha. Additionally, there are destabilizing elements similar to SLDE found in IL-2 and IL-6. The 3'-UTR of G-CSF mRNA contains a destabilizing element that is insensitive to calcium ionophore, hence SLDE regulates G-CSF mRNA. AUDEs do not function in 5637 Bladder carcinoma cells, but the SLDE does. The two destablizing elements, SLDE and AURE, provide multiple mechanisms to regulate cytokine expression.

Neutrophils, are the most abundant type of granulocytes and are responsible for leading the first response of the immune system response against invaders. Granulocyte-colony stimulating factor (G-CSF) is a glycoprotein that stimulates proliferation of neutrophil progenitor cells and leads to the maturation of neutrophils. monocytes and macrophages are the cells that secrete G-CSF, but it is found that endothelial cells, fibroblasts, and bone marrow stromal cells also secrete the glycoprotein. Expression of G-CSF glycoprotein is complex and has both transcription and post transcription regulation. Two specific types of regulatory elements are present in the 3' untranslated region (3'UTR) of G-CSF mRNA. These elements are referred to as adenylate uridylate-rich elements (AUREs) and stem-loop destabilizing element (SLDE). They have been shown to be destabilizing elements of the G-CSF mRNA. On the other hand, the stability of the mRNA is regulated by p38 mitogen-activated protein kinase (MAPK) and this phosphorylating enzyme has been shown to be linked to the AUREs in the 3'UTR.

SB203580 specifically inhibits the catalytic activity of p38 MAPK by competitively binding to the active site where ATP is supposed to bind and is used to probe the role of p38 MAPK in cells. SB203580 amplified the lipopolysaccharide-induced increase in the G-CSF mRNA levels in mouse bone marrow-derived macrophages and in THP-1 human macrophages. By displaying that the decay of G-CSF mRNA, in the presence of actinomycin D, was slower in SB203580-treated cells. SB203580 increased the stability of G-CSF mRNA. SLDE is essential for the SB203580-induced increase in the stability of mRNA.
