= Polymer-protein hybrid =

Nanostructures of protein-polymer conjugates

Polymer-protein hybrids are a class of nanostructure composed of protein-polymer conjugates (i.e. complexes composed of one protein attached to one or more polymer chains). The protein component generally gives the advantages of biocompatibility and biodegradability, as many proteins are produced naturally by the body and are therefore well tolerated and metabolized. Although proteins are used as targeted therapy drugs, the main limitations—the lack of stability and insufficient circulation times still remain. Therefore, protein-polymer conjugates have been investigated to further enhance pharmacologic behavior and stability. By adjusting the chemical structure of the protein-polymer conjugates, polymer-protein particles with unique structures and functions, such as stimulus responsiveness, enrichment in specific tissue types, and enzyme activity, can be synthesized. Polymer-protein particles have been the focus of much research recently because they possess potential uses including bioseparations, imaging, biosensing, gene and drug delivery.

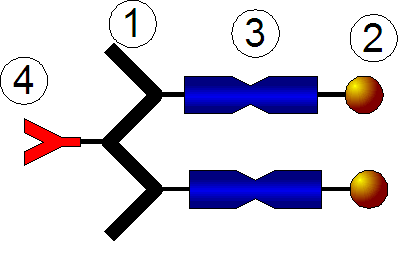
Structure of a polymer conjugate

== Types ==
=== Single chain protein-polymer hybrids ===
Attaching a single polymer chain to a specific site away from the active center of the protein has less impact on protein activity compared with random attachments. In practice, attaching a single polymer chain can be used to adjust chemical properties of the therapeutic protein. For example, conjugation of a single chain of the hydrophilic polyethylene glycol (PEG) can increase the hydrodynamic radius of the protein conjugate by 5-10 fold. Attachment to PEG was mainly achieved by covalent conjugation via the grafting to strategy, targeting chemo-selective anchor groups. Other polymers, such as oligosaccharides and polypeptides, offer different properties to the enzymes attached to them.

=== Stimuli responsive hybrids ===
==== Heat ====
Researchers conjugated the thermo-responsive polymer poly(N-isopropylacrylamide) (pNIPAm) with the biotin-recognizing protein streptavidin close to its recognition site. At temperatures above the lower critical solution temperature (LCST), the polymer collapses and blocks the binding site, thus reversibly preventing biotin from binding to streptavidin. By copolymerization with two different thermosensitive polymers poly(sulfobetaine methacrylamide) (pSBAm) and pNIPAm together, researchers can control enzyme activity in a small temperature window.

==== Light ====
((N,N'-dimethylacrylamide)-co-4-phenylazophenyl acrylate) at the active site of endoglycanase creates a photoswitchable protein hybrid. The resulting hybrid catalyzes the hydrolysis of glycoside when irradiated by 350 nm UV light, but turns inactive under 420 nm visible light depending on the conformation of the conjugated polymer.

=== Polymer shell protein core ===
A polymer shell is formed by conjugation of multiple molecules of polymers onto the protein core. The polymer shell can either protect the protein core from unwanted degradation or create desired interactive sites for guest molecules. The first generation of polymer shell protein core structures mainly used of Polyethylene glycol (PEG) chains to increase the hydrodynamic radius and reduce immune response to proteins. However, the PEG shell can reduce protein activity in the inner core. More advanced designs use biodegradable linkers to achieve programmed release of the protein core in specific tissues. Several therapeutic designs with biodegradable PEG shells are already being developed in vivo.

Direct conjugation of polymers ("grafting to" strategy) can efficiently construct a polymer shell with diverse polymer types, however, it has low polymer density, especially with large polymers. In contrast, "grafting from" strategy allows the formation of a dense and uniform polymer shell. The protein core can also function as a carrier for other therapeutic molecules, such as plasmid DNA.

Dendrite polymer shells have a high volume to molecular weight ratio compared with traditional polymer shells. Using branched carbohydrates can give unique biological properties while maintaining molecular definition.

=== Non-covalent conjugation ===
Although covalent conjugation has been the dominant strategy for constructing polymer-protein hybrids, noncovalent chemistry can add another level of complexity and provides the opportunity to create higher-ordered structures. Specifically, self-assembly by non-covalent interactions is progressing rapidly. Supramolecular self-assembly can create nanoparticles, vesicles/micelles, protein cages, etc. Metal-binding interactions, host-guest, and boronic acid-based chemistries are widely studied as non-covalent conjugation methods to create polymer-protein hybrids.

=== Polymer-Streptavidin system ===
Streptavidin is a protein purified from the bacterium Streptomyces avidinii, which has a high affinity for biotin. By covalently linking streptavidin and polymers, well defined supramolecular constructs can be created due to the high specificity of

Streptavidin for both biotin and its analogues.

Building upon the covalent core shell strategy, several polymer–streptavidin systems have been developed for affinity separation, bio-sensors and diagnostic applications due to the robust binding conditions and stability of the protein.

Streptavidin can be used as a macro-initiator for in situ ATRP, through grafting from strategy, a stoichiometrically well defined polymer-protein conjugate can be synthesized. Polymer streptavidin systems can also be empowered to cross the cellular membrane by conjugating with cell penetrating molecules such as peptides and membrane disturbing polymers.

Polymer streptavidin systems can also be modulated to respond to certain environmental changes such as pH. By incorporating pH responsive poly(propylacrylic acid) (PPAAc) into the system, tumor cell suppressor p53 and cytochrome C can be delivered into cancer cells efficiently.

For biomolecules that are not hampered by the biotin-streptavidin interaction, iminobiotin, an analogue of biotin, has been applied as a pH-sensitive linker that allows the controlled and reversible assembly and intracellular release of cargo molecules in acidic intracellular compartments.

=== Protein-polymer hybrid supramolecular structures ===
Polymer-protein conjugates can also form a higher ordered supramolecular structure via self-assembly of amphiphilic polymers into micelles and microcapsules, which is a potential strategy to generate drug delivery systems. Such systems have the innate advantage of rapid preparation, a high drug loading capacity, ease of surface decoration, and the potential to be stimuli responsive.

==== Micelles ====
Micelles refers to a type of supramolecular structure consisting of amphiphilic molecules self-assemblies, usually hollow centered. Researchers successfully conjugated a diblock copolymer site specifically onto GFP, the resulting amphiphilic polymer-protein conjugate is capable of reversible self-assembly into micelles.

In addition to retaining the native globular shape of proteins, the polypeptide backbone of denatured proteins can also be utilized to be conjugated with hydrophilic polymer chains to generate higher ordered structure through hydrophobic interactions. For example, nanoconjugates of poly-ethylene glycol(PEG) and denatured bovine serum albumin(BSA) will spontaneously self-assemble into a micellar structure, whose protein core can adsorb high numbers of hydrophobic drugs.

==== Nanoparticles ====
An efficient way to synthesize protein-polymer hybrid nanoparticles is to take advantage of photoinitiated reversible addition−fragmentation chain transfer (RAFT) polymerization-induced self-assembly(PISA) by using multi-RAFT modified bovine serum albumin (BSA) as a macromolecular chain transfer agent. RAFT mediated growth of the PHPMA chains will graft from the BSA-RAFT, and increase the hydrophobicity of the star BSA−PHPMA conjugates. At the critical aggregation concentration, they form nanoparticles due to the hydrophobic interactions. The resulting nanoparticles show excellent encapsulation capability for both hydrophobic and hydrophilic molecules, such as cancer drugs and DNA.

A rather easy method to prepare protein-polymer hybrid nanoparticles is nanoprecipitation. Spherical nanoparticles composed of BSA-PMMA with diameters of around 100 nm were obtained and the water insoluble chemotherapeutic drug camptothecin was encapsulated within the hydrophobic core consisting of PMMA. Such protein-polymer hybrid nanoparticles possess tunable sizes and surface charges, have attractive bio-compatibilities and allow efficient cell uptake. Camptothecin-encapsulated BSA-PMMA nanoparticles revealed enhanced anti-tumor activity both in vitro and in animals.

Beyond the nanoscale, protein-polymer conjugate could also be used as building blocks for constructing more complicated structures such as microcapsules through hydrophobic interactions. By performing pickering emulsion technique to process BSA–pNIPAm nanoconjugates into hollowed microcapsules consisting of a closely packed monolayer of conjugated protein–polymer building blocks (named proteinosomes). These proteinosomes exhibit protocellular properties such as guest molecule encapsulation, selective permeability, controllable mobilization, gene-directed protein synthesis and membrane-gated internalized enzyme catalysis.

Based on the above-mentioned method, a multi responsive microcapsule has been synthesized by incorporating photoswitchable spiropyran units and the thermoresponsive monomer N-isopropylacrylamide into the membrane. Stimuli responsive membrane exhibited advantages in the capture and release of different-molecular-weight products by opening and closing the photoresponsive spiropyran ligands, under body temperature, room temperature, UV, redox.

Another effective way to modulate the permeability of microcapsules was based on a self-sacrificing strategy. By selectively using lysozyme and BSA as building blocks as well as self-sacrificing components, the corresponding pores could be generated in the membrane, and then the permeability of the generated microcapsules could be increased from10 kDa to 22 kDa and then to 71 kDa. By loading FITC-Lys (14 kDa), RBITCdextran (70 kDa) and DNA (90 kDa) into the microcapsules, a programmed release of the encapsulants from low molecular weight to high molecular weight was realized.

Using similar strategy, pH-sensitive protein-polymer microcapsules were developed. Both doxycycline (DOX) and folic acid were incorporated onto the surface of protein covalently. The very low toxicity of polymer-protein nanoconjugates effectively avoided the high toxicity of DOX, which is expected to not only reduce toxic side effects, but also improve anticancer efficiency in vitro examinations.

=== Protein Nanocages ===
Protein nanocages are natural nanocarriers composed of protein subunits with a porous structure. They benefit from monodispersity, intrinsic high stability for protection of internalized drugs from enzymatic degradation and controllable assembly for cargo loading and release.

However, their application might be blocked by immunogenicity, broad biodistribution and significant function and property variations. The incorporation of polymer chains by performing in situ ATRP on the outer surface of or inside the protein nanocages can be an effective way to mitigate those drawbacks. For example, increased loading density of cargo molecules and enhanced stability of the cage assembly can be obtained via internal ATRP inside the cavity of the virus capsid.

Beyond virus type particles, large multimeric proteins such as the iron storage protein ferritin have emerged as attractive tools to be used as well-defined nano-containers. Using a grafting from strategy, polymers can be introduced to ferritin in a highly regular fashion for precise spatial control. These polymer–ferritin constructs exhibited protease resistance, enabling longer retention time within the bloodstream while reducing possible antibody interactions.

== Properties ==
Polymer-Protein nanoparticles not only contain the traditional properties of nanoparticles, but also have their own unique properties based on the properties of specific proteins. Because they are proteinaceous, they have high biocompatibility, biodegradability and biofunctionality. Protein-polymer bioconjugates which is the building block of Polymer-Protein hybrids exhibit a unique array of properties such as: light-switching effects, acoustic signal capture, thermal energy transfer, and magnetic signal response.

== Synthesis ==
=== Synthesis of Polymer-Protein hybrids ===
Generally, Polymer-Protein hybrids can be synthesized by interfacial self-assembly of protein–polymer conjugates in emulsions.

==== Grafting to ====
Grafting to approach which is the most common and straightforward methodology refers to directly attaching the synthetic polymers to the target protein. This technique can be engineered for site-specific or random conjugation and, when compared to other conjugation methods, provides simple and thorough characterization of polymer before conjugation. And when using this method, the protein remains unaffected by polymerization methods.

==== Grafting from ====
As shown in the figure, a protein is firstly conjugated with the initiator and the polymer chain then grows from the protein core in a controlled manner via living polymerization. Likewise, to the earlier discussed methods, grafting from approach can be designed for site-specific or random attachment.

==== Grafting through ====
Not like the grafting from and grafting to approach which can conjugate several polymers onto one protein core, the grafting through approach enables several proteins to connect to one polymer chain due to the multivalent nature of protein.

== Application ==
=== Thermoresponsive protein–polymer particles ===
Thermoresponsive conjugates have been exploited for the subsequent separation of proteins from a complex mixture. This method has been utilized to purify polyclonal antibodies in serum samples. This method of purification is rapid, sensitive, inexpensive and could be used to purify various types of antibodies.

Thermoresponsive conjugates can also be exploited to mediate bioactivity. One of the utilities of the method is demonstrated temperature control of biotin binding and release. Biotin binding was observed below the LCST, while above the LCST the conjugates aggregated, and the biotin binding affinity was reduced by ~20%. By changing the temperature, the recovery of the biotinylated molecules can be achieved.

=== Protein–polymer particles designed for drug delivery ===
The absorption of proteins for particles in physiological fluids can greatly affect the subsequent medical performance of particles in vivo. Nonspecific protein adsorption can be controlled in vivo by modifying the nanoparticle surface with a non-toxic, biocompatible protein possessing tolerable antigenic properties such as albumin.

The high recognition ability of proteins can enable high delivery efficiency. Protein-polymer particles have potential to deliver drugs to specific regions of the body using the inherent biorecognition property at the protein interface. Additionally, in some cases the presentation of specific proteins on nanoparticle surfaces can be useful for aiding passage through impermeable biological barriers.

=== Particles designed for other biomedical and biotechnology applications ===
==== Nanoreactors ====
Enzyme-catalyzed reactions can be performed at higher temperatures using enzyme-immobilized nanoparticles, in which the presence of multiple proteins at the nanoparticle surface facilitates the retention of water molecules limiting the denaturation of the attached proteins. After modification with poly(amide), protein activity could remain unchanged over 500 min at 50 °C, while the half-life time of the native lipase at 50 °C is only 30 min in aqueous solution. Immobilized enzymes on nanoparticles can significantly improve the efficiency of enzyme reactions by increasing tolerance to a wider range of experimental conditions without significantly reducing biological activity. Besides, polymer-protein particles are reported to control the activity of proteins and compartmentalize different enzymes to perform multi-step reactions.

==== Protein purification and separation ====
By immobilizing proteins to polymer nanoparticles or polymer/inorganic hybrid nanoparticles (such as polymer-stabilized iron oxide nanoparticles), proteins or their affinity ligands can be separated from complex solutions by applying magnetic fields or centrifugation. Lipase attached to iron oxide nanoparticles maintained 85% biological activity after 30 reaction and separation cycles.

As the appropriate target is combined with magnetic nanoparticles, the selected target can be magnetically separated directly from natural biological fluids, which offers a fast, gentle, extensible, and easy to automate separation technique. The simplicity of magnetic separation has been applied in a number of disciplines, including mineral processing wastewater treatment, molecular biology, cell sorting, and clinical diagnostics.

==== Protocells ====
Microcapsules termed protocells prepared by polymer-protein hybrids are the hotspot of the research area recently, enabling various functions such as bioreactors, cascade system and multiresponsive membranes, etc.
