= Furegrelate =

Chemical compound

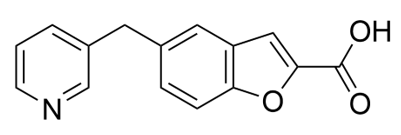

Clinical data
- Routes of administration: Oral

Pharmacokinetic data
- Bioavailability: 80-90 %
- Metabolism: 22-38 %
- Elimination half-life: 0.12 – 0.17 h-1
- Excretion: Renal

Identifiers
- IUPAC name: 5-(3-Pyridinylmethyl)benzofurancarboxylic acid
- CAS Number: 85666-24-6
- PubChem CID: 3437
- ChemSpider: 3319
- UNII: KX4D9BZA6X
- ChEBI: CHEBI:103833
- ChEMBL: ChEMBL1204948
- CompTox Dashboard (EPA): DTXSID7046960

Chemical and physical data
- Formula: C_{15}H_{11}NO_{3}
- Molar mass: 253.257 g·mol^{−1}
- Melting point: 229–230 °C (444–446 °F)
- Solubility in water: <15 in H2O mg/mL (20 °C)

Furegrelate, also known as 5-(3-pyridinylmethyl)benzofurancarboxylic acid, is a chemical compound with thromboxane enzyme inhibiting properties that was originally developed by Pharmacia Corporation as a drug to treat arrhythmias, ischaemic heart disorders, and thrombosis but was discontinued. It is commercially available in the form furegrelate sodium salt.

Furegrelate is able to bind to the enzyme thromboxane A2 synthase. By binding to thromboxane A2 synthase it negates the effects and prevents it from acting like a vasoconstrictor. Because of this Furegrelate is capable of preventing several diseases involving thrombosis, the occurrence of blood clots that block veins or arteries. Furegrelate is orally administrable and rapidly absorbed in the blood. Currently no adverse effects of furegrelate are known due to a lack of research, although thromboxane A2 synthase devisentie could be a potential risk.

== Structure activity relationships ==
5-(3-Pyridinylmethyl)benzofurancarboxylic acid, is an achiral, organic molecule containing a pyridine ring and a carboxylic acid group. The compound is a member of the benzofurans and can be found in a variety of forms (free-base, sodium salt and hydrochloric acid salt) all of them variations of the carboxylic acid functionality. Furegrelate in its free-base form is not well-soluble in pH-neutral aqueous environments and can therefore pass the lipophilic cell membranes.

The pyridine functionality of Furegrelate has biologically the most interesting properties. Pyridines are known to have an inhibiting effect on the synthesis of TxA2 Thromboxane - known for platelet aggregation and vasoconstricting properties. Research also showed that pyridines substituted at the -3’ position with aryl or alkyl carboxylic acid groups, undergo a major enhancement of specifically TxA2 synthase inhibition, probably due to a more favourable molecular orientation during the reaction.

== Synthesis ==
Furegrelate is a synthetic compound that cannot be synthesised by the human body. Several pathways were proposed for the synthesis of Furegrelate sodium salt and related compounds by Johnson et al. and is presented in Figure 1. The nitro group of the starting material, 3-(4-nitrobenzyl)pyridine (1), is reduced using hydrogen over palladium on activated carbon to form 3-(4-aminobenzyl)pyridine (2). In the following step, nitric acid was created in situ by mixing sodium nitrite with sulphuric acid in ice-cold water. The nitric acid attaches to the amino group, forming a diazo group. The hydroxyl group is obtained by stirring the diazo intermediate in a hot aqueous sulphuric acid solution, giving product 3. Product 3 was formylated on the ortho-position relative to the hydroxyl group, using an adjusted Duff reaction using hexamine and trifluoroacetic acid (TFA). In the Duff reaction, the formyl carbon is created from hexamine, leading to product 3-(3-hydroxy-4-formylbenzyl)pyridine, 4. Benzofuran-2-carboxylic acid ethyl ester (5), was obtained using a base-promoted reaction with diethyl bromomalonate and sodium hydride on product 4. To increase NaH solubility, a crown ether was used. Ester product 5 was then transformed to Furegrelate sodium salt 6 using methanol and sodium hydroxide in water. Johnson and co-workers synthesised also two other Furegrelate chemical forms: the free-base 7 and hydrochloric acid salt 8 forms.

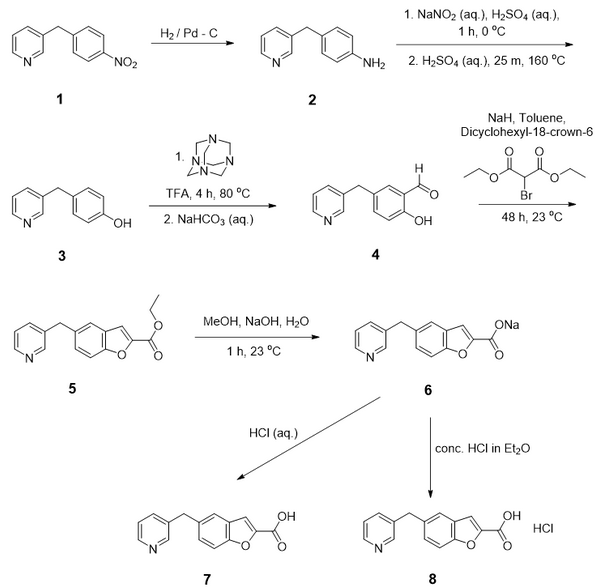
Figure 1 Schematic overview of a possible synthetic route towards Furegrelate.

The starting material, 3-(4-nitrobenzyl)pyridine (1), is commercially available but can also be synthesised from the pyridine-derivative nicotinic acid, as shown in Figure 2. In the first step, nicotinic acid is chlorinated with SOCl_{3} after which a Friedel-Crafts acylation is performed to form 3-benzoyl pyridine. This compound is reduced using hydrogen gas in combination with a palladium catalyst, creating 3-benzylpyridine. 3-Benzylpyridine can be converted to 3-(4-nitrobenzyl)pyridine using ammonium nitrate and trifluoroacetic anhydride (TFAA) in chloroform. Various intermediate compounds are commercially available, or can be synthesised in multiple ways, but a complete synthetic proposal was made to indicate the synthetic options.

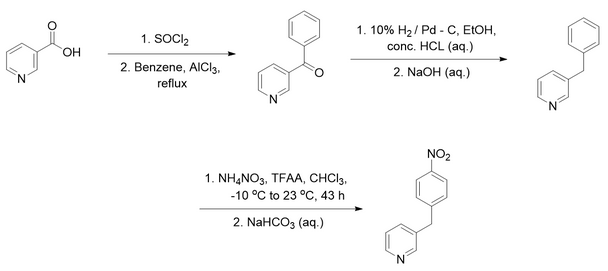
Figure 2 Schematic overview of a synthetic pathway from nicotinic acid to 3-(4-nitrobenzyl)pyridine.

== Available forms ==
Only one form of furegrelate is commercially available (see 2 structure and reactivity). Its physical form is a crystalline solid. It is sold as a sodium salt.

== Pharmacology ==
=== Mechanisms of action ===
Furegrelate is an enzyme inhibitor. It combines with the enzyme thromboxane A2 synthase to prevent the normal substrate-enzyme combination and the catalytic reaction. Thromboxane A2, the compound synthesized by this enzyme, promotes the aggregation of platelets and is a vasoconstrictor. The compound plays a role in several diseases involving thrombosis, the occurrence of blood clots that block veins or arteries. Thromboxane is synthesized from a fatty acid called arachidonic acid. In platelets this fatty acid is metabolized to an endoperoxide called prostaglandin H2 by the enzyme cyclooxygenase 1. This endoperoxide is in turn metabolized to thromboxane A2 by thromboxane A2 synthase, a cytochrome P450 enzyme that occurs in the endoplasmic reticulum membrane. Multiple cyclooxygenase inhibitors are already used as drugs against thrombotic diseases. These drugs inhibit both the production of thromboxane and prostacyclin. Furegrelate however, specifically inhibits thromboxane A2 synthase.

=== Metabolism ===
The route of administration of furegrelate is oral. The absorption and disposition of the parent drug in male volunteers have been studied after single- and multiple-dose oral administration. The results from the single-dose study indicate that furegrelate is rapidly absorbed in the blood, within maximally 1.0 to 1.7 hr. Distribution, metabolism and elimination happened with a rate constant of 0.12 to 0.17 hr-1. Furegrelate is primarily eliminated by the kidney, with 62 to 78% of the dose excreted as parent drug. Dog experiments indicated that furegrelate is rapidly distributed. The half‐life of the compound was 132 min after an intravenous dose. Oral exposure to the drug had similar absorption and elimination kinetics as the intravenous results. The bioavailability of furegrelate dosed orally was either around 80% based on measurements of the blood concentration or more than 90% based on urinary excretion of the parent compound. Oral absorption of the drug in dogs occurred rapidly. The plasma levels reached a peak in one to two hours after ingestion. The drug was measurable in blood within 30 minutes. Thromboxane A2 is hydrated within about 30 seconds to the biologically inactive thromboxane B2. For this reason thromboxane B2 can be used as an indicator for the inhibition of thromboxane A2 synthase, and thus the presence of furegrelate.

== Adverse effects ==
Current studies show no negative side effects of furegrelate due to off target effects in either humans or dogs. Furegrelate does not appear to show any inhibitory effect on thrombin-stimulated PGI2 biosynthesis in human endothelial cells, the 5-lipoxygenase in human neutrophils, or the cyclo-oxygenase in a variety of test systems.

“Studies failed to detect major off-target effects in preclinical testing in dogs or in Phase 1 clinical trials using healthy adult human subjects.”

A possible adverse effect of furegrelate would be thromboxane synthase deficiency due to either too high of a dosage or due to too long administration. Thromboxane synthase deficiency is characterized by mucocutaneous, gastrointestinal, or surgical bleeding. However, this effect has not been studied yet, due to a lack of research in high dosage or long term administration of furegrelate.

== Toxicity ==
The toxicological properties have not been thoroughly investigated.

== Animal studies ==
The effects of furegrelate sodium have been tested using piglets. Three groups of piglets were compared. The first group of piglets were exposed to 21 days of normoxia (N; oxygen tension of 21% FIO2), the second group was exposed to chronic hypoxia (CH; low oxygen tension, 10% FIO2), the third group was exposed to the same chronic hypoxia as group 2, with the addition of 3mg/kg furegrelate 3 times a day. The second group showed a 2.55-fold increase of the pulmonary vascular resistance index (PVRI) compared to the first group. The third group showed a reduction of 34% of the PVRI compared to the second group, and showed an improvement of the right ventricular hypertrophy. When looking at arterial distensibility the second group showed a 33% reduction compared to the first group, the third group showed a reduction of only 20%. Furthermore, the muscularization of small pulmonary arteries was less prominent when comparing group 3 to group 2. Lastly, group 3 showed lower basal and vasodilator-induced transpulmonary pressures compared to group 2. In conclusion the inhibition of the enzyme thromboxane A2 synthase by furegrelate reduces hypoxia induced pulmonary arterial hypertension by preserving the pulmonary vasculature.

Furegrelate reduces renal vasoconstriction of angiotensin II, a blood pressure increasing hormone, in rats. It does this presumably by enhancing the formation of vasodilator prostaglandins. Inhibition of furegrelate induced a proapoptotic disposition of glioma cells in mice. In addition it increased the sensitivity to the chemotherapeutic agent 1,3-bis(2-chloroethyl)-1-nitrosourea. This significantly increased the survival time of intracerebral glioma-bearing mice.
