= Histamine dihydrochloride =

Chemical compound

Clinical data
- Trade names: Ceplene
- License data: EU EMA: by INN
- Routes of administration: Subcutaneous injection, topical
- ATC code: L03AX14 (WHO)

Legal status
- Legal status: Approved for use in the EU (2008) and Israel (2011)

Identifiers
- IUPAC name: 2-(1H-imidazol-5-yl)ethanamine dihydrochloride
- CAS Number: 56-92-8
- PubChem CID: 11309913
- ChemSpider: 5613
- UNII: 3POA0Q644U
- CompTox Dashboard (EPA): DTXSID1058767
- ECHA InfoCard: 100.000.272

Chemical and physical data
- Formula: C_{5}H_{11}Cl_{2}N_{3}
- Molar mass: 184.06 g·mol^{−1}
- 3D model (JSmol): Interactive image
- SMILES: C1=C(NC=N1)CCN.Cl.Cl
- InChI: InChI=1S/C5H9N3.2ClH/c6-2-1-5-3-7-4-8-5;;/h3-4H,1-2,6H2,(H,7,8);2*1H; Key:PPZMYIBUHIPZOS-UHFFFAOYSA-N

Histamine dihydrochloride (trade name Ceplene) is a salt of histamine that is used as a drug for the prevention of relapse in patients diagnosed with acute myeloid leukemia (AML).

It is also an FDA-approved active ingredient for topical analgesic use for the temporary relief of minor aches and pains of muscles and joints associated with arthritis, simple backache, bruises, sprains, and strains and is available in over-the-counter (OTC) products.

== Use in leukemia ==
Histamine dihydrochloride is administered in conjunction with low doses of the immune-activating cytokine interleukin-2 (IL-2) in the post-remission phase of acute myeloid leukemia (AML), i.e. when patients have completed the initial chemotherapy. This combination has been reported to significantly reduce the risk of relapse in AML. The effect is particularly pronounced in patients in their first remission who are below the age of 60.

The combination of histamine dihydrochloride and interleukin-2 was approved for use in AML patients within the European Union in October 2008 and is marketed in the EU by the Swedish pharmaceutical company Meda. The drug is also available through a named patient program in several other countries (excluding the US).

== Proposed mechanism of action ==
Histamine dihydrochloride acts by improving the immune-enhancing properties of IL-2, and laboratory studies have shown that this combination can induce immune-mediated killing of leukemic cells. The treatment (in the form of subcutaneous injections) is given in 3-week cycles by the patients at home for 18 months, thus coinciding with the period of highest relapse risk. The side-effects include transient flush and headache, whereas IL-2 may induce low-grade fever and inflammation at the site of injection. Histamine dihydrochloride has been developed by researchers at the University of Gothenburg, Sweden.
