= Cridanimod =

Cridanimod INN: Cridanimod

Identifiers
- IUPAC name: 2-(9-Oxoacridin-10-yl)acetic acid
- CAS Number: 38609-97-1
- PubChem CID: 38072
- DrugBank: DB13674
- ChemSpider: 34903
- UNII: X91E9EME19
- KEGG: D10507
- ChEBI: CHEBI:136036
- ChEMBL: ChEMBL1569545
- CompTox Dashboard (EPA): DTXSID6046557
- ECHA InfoCard: 100.162.778

Chemical and physical data
- Formula: C_{15}H_{11}NO_{3}
- Molar mass: 253.257 g·mol^{−1}
- 3D model (JSmol): Interactive image
- SMILES: C1=CC=C2C(=C1)C(=O)C3=CC=CC=C3N2CC(=O)O
- InChI: InChI=1S/C15H11NO3/c17-14(18)9-16-12-7-3-1-5-10(12)15(19)11-6-2-4-8-13(11)16/h1-8H,9H2,(H,17,18); Key:UOMKBIIXHQIERR-UHFFFAOYSA-N

Cridanimod, also known as cycloferon or meglumine acridone acetate, is a low molecular weight immunomodulatory drug known to trigger the production of interferons, which are proteins that play a crucial role in the immune response against viral infections. It is primarily used in the treatment and prevention of various viral infections, including influenza and acute respiratory viral infections (ARVI), as well as in managing conditions such as HIV and herpes infections.

== Mechanism of action ==
Cridanimod functions as an inducer of endogenous interferons, particularly types 1 and 2, which are essential in the body's defense against viral pathogens. By stimulating the production of these interferons, cridanimod enhances the immune system's ability to combat viral infections and reduce the severity and duration of symptoms.

== Clinical efficacy ==
Several studies have demonstrated the clinical efficacy of cridanimod in treating viral infections. In the context of respiratory infections, cridanimod has been shown to significantly reduce the duration and intensity of symptoms such as fever and to decrease the incidence of complications like pneumonia. In a systematic review and meta-analysis, cridanimod was found to increase the chances of recovery and reduce the frequency of recurrent exacerbations in otorhinolaryngologic diseases by 25%. Additionally, its use in children and adults with viral respiratory diseases has been associated with a more than five-fold increase in the probability of avoiding severe disease outcomes.

== Applications in other infections ==
Beyond respiratory infections, cridanimod has been used effectively in the treatment of HIV and herpes infections. Studies indicate that cycloferon can provide more than a three-fold increase in achieving stable remission and reducing exacerbation frequency compared to basic therapies. It has also been utilized in managing virus-associated inflammatory gynecologic diseases, with a reported clinical efficacy of 79%.
