= Granulocyte colony-stimulating factor =

Mammalian protein found in humans

CSF3
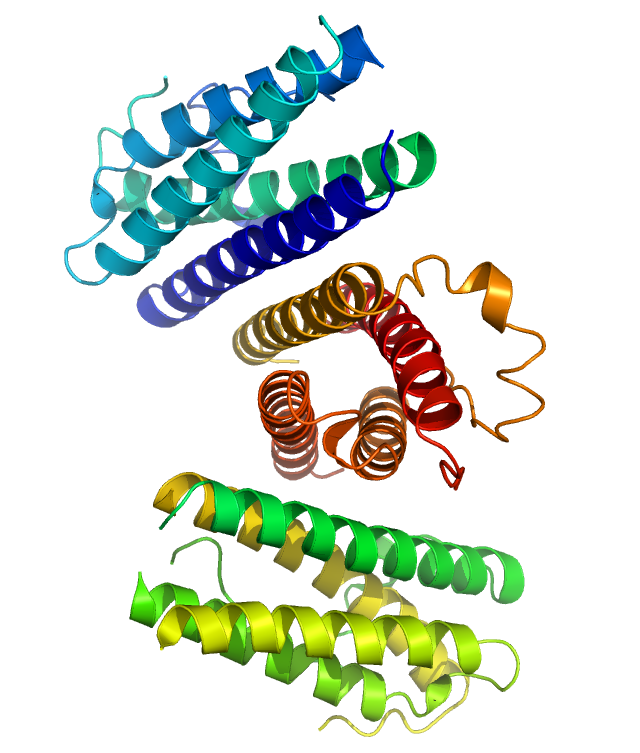

Identifiers
- Aliases: CSF3, C17orf33, CSF3OS, GCSF, colony stimulating factor 3
- External IDs: OMIM: 138970; MGI: 1339751; GeneCards: CSF3
Available structures
PDB	Ortholog search: PDBe RCSB
PDB	List of PDB id codes 2D9Q, 1CD9, 1GNC, 1PGR, 1RHG

Gene location (Human)
Chr.	Chromosome 17 (human)
Band	17q21.1	Start	40,015,361 bp
Band	17q21.1	End	40,017,813 bp

Gene location (Mouse)
Chr.	Chromosome 11 (mouse)
Band	11 D|11 62.45 cM	Start	98,592,089 bp
Band	11 D|11 62.45 cM	End	98,594,455 bp
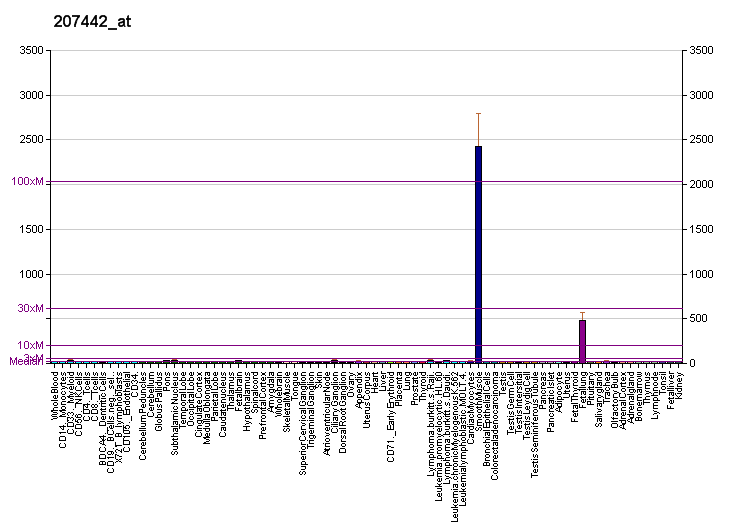
RNA expression pattern
Bgee	Human / Mouse (ortholog); Top expressed in: testicle; olfactory zone of nasal mucosa; vena cava; muscle of thigh; gastrocnemius muscle; left uterine tube; cartilage tissue; upper lobe of left lung; mucosa of paranasal sinus; gonad / Top expressed in: entorhinal cortex; embryo; CA3 field; lactiferous gland; cervix; endothelial cell of lymphatic vessel; medulla oblongata; primary motor cortex; blastocyst; integument; More reference expression data
BioGPS	More reference expression data
Gene ontology
Molecular function	cytokine activity; enzyme binding; growth factor activity; granulocyte colony-stimulating factor receptor binding
Cellular component	extracellular region; extracellular space
Biological process	positive regulation of protein kinase B signaling; positive regulation of actin filament polymerization; cellular response to cytokine stimulus; positive regulation of peptidyl-serine phosphorylation; multicellular organism development; granulocyte differentiation; immune response; positive regulation of peptidyl-tyrosine phosphorylation; positive regulation of phosphatidylinositol 3-kinase signaling; positive regulation of protein binding; cellular response to lipopolysaccharide; positive regulation of actin cytoskeleton reorganization; positive regulation of transcription by RNA polymerase II; negative regulation of neuron death; positive regulation of myeloid cell differentiation; response to ethanol; positive regulation of cell population proliferation; neutrophil differentiation; macrophage differentiation; myeloid cell development; regulation of signaling receptor activity; cytokine-mediated signaling pathway; positive regulation of DNA-binding transcription factor activity
Sources:Amigo / QuickGO
Orthologs
Databases	NCBI: entry; OMA: entry
Species	Human	Mouse
Entrez	1440	12985
Ensembl	ENSG00000108342	ENSMUSG00000038067
UniProt	P09919	P09920
RefSeq (mRNA)	NM_000759; NM_001178147; NM_172219; NM_172220	NM_009971
RefSeq (protein)	NP_000750; NP_001171618; NP_757373; NP_757374	NP_034101
Location (UCSC)	Chr 17: 40.02 – 40.02 Mb	Chr 11: 98.59 – 98.59 Mb
PubMed search
- Wikidata
View/Edit Human	View/Edit Mouse

Granulocyte colony-stimulating factor (G-CSF or GCSF), also known as colony-stimulating factor 3 (CSF 3), is a glycoprotein that stimulates the bone marrow to produce granulocytes and stem cells and release them into the bloodstream.

Functionally, it is a cytokine and hormone, a type of colony-stimulating factor, and is produced by a number of different tissues. The pharmaceutical analogs of naturally occurring G-CSF are called filgrastim and lenograstim.

G-CSF also stimulates the survival, proliferation, differentiation, and function of neutrophil precursors and mature neutrophils.

== Gene ==
The gene for G-CSF is located on chromosome 17, locus q11.2-q12. Nagata et al. found that the GCSF gene has four introns, and that two different polypeptides are synthesized from the same gene by differential splicing of mRNA.

The two polypeptides differ by the presence or absence of three amino acids. Expression studies indicate that both have authentic GCSF activity.

It is thought that stability of the G-CSF mRNA is regulated by an RNA element called the G-CSF factor stem-loop destabilising element.

== Function ==
G-CSF is produced by endothelium, macrophages, and a number of other immune cells. The natural human glycoprotein exists in two forms, a 174- and 177-amino-acid-long protein of molecular weight 19,600 grams per mole. The more-abundant and more-active 174-amino acid form has been used in the development of pharmaceutical products by recombinant DNA (rDNA) technology.

White blood cells
The G-CSF-receptor is present on precursor cells in the bone marrow, and, in response to stimulation by G-CSF, initiates proliferation and differentiation into mature granulocytes. G-CSF stimulates the survival, proliferation, differentiation, and function of neutrophil precursors and mature neutrophils. G-CSF regulates them using Janus kinase (JAK)/signal transducer and activator of transcription (STAT) and Ras/mitogen-activated protein kinase (MAPK) and phosphatidylinositol 3-kinase (PI3K)/protein kinase B (Akt) signal transduction pathway.

Hematopoietic System
G-CSF is also a potent inducer of hematopoietic stem cell (HSC) mobilization from the bone marrow into the bloodstream, although it has been shown that it does not directly affect the hematopoietic progenitors that are mobilized.

Neurons
G-CSF can also act on neuronal cells as a neurotrophic factor. Indeed, its receptor is expressed by neurons in the brain and spinal cord. The action of G-CSF in the central nervous system is to induce neurogenesis, to increase the neuroplasticity and to counteract apoptosis. These properties are currently under investigations for the development of treatments of neurological diseases such as cerebral ischemia.

== Medical use ==
=== Chemotherapy-induced neutropenia ===
Chemotherapy can cause myelosuppression and unacceptably low levels of white blood cells (leukopenia), making patients susceptible to infections and sepsis. G-CSF stimulates the production of granulocytes, a type of white blood cell. In oncology and hematology, a recombinant form of G-CSF is used with certain cancer patients to accelerate recovery and reduce mortality from neutropenia after chemotherapy, allowing higher-intensity treatment regimens. It is administered to oncology patients via subcutaneous or intravenous routes. A QSP model of neutrophil production and a PK/PD model of a cytotoxic chemotherapeutic drug (Zalypsis) have been developed to optimize the use of G-CSF in chemotherapy regimens with the aim to prevent mild-neutropenia.

G-CSF was first trialled as a therapy for neutropenia induced by chemotherapy in 1988. The treatment was well tolerated and a dose-dependent rise in circulating neutrophils was noted.

A study in mice has shown that G-CSF may decrease bone mineral density.

G-CSF administration has been shown to attenuate the telomere loss associated with chemotherapy.

=== Use in drug-induced neutropenia ===
Neutropenia can be a severe side effect of clozapine, an antipsychotic medication in the treatment of schizophrenia. G-CSF can restore neutrophil count. Following a return to baseline after stopping the drug, it may sometimes be safely rechallenged with the added use of G-CSF.

=== Before blood donation ===
G-CSF is also used to increase the number of hematopoietic stem cells in the blood of the donor before collection by leukapheresis for use in hematopoietic stem cell transplantation. For this purpose, G-CSF appears to be safe in pregnancy during implantation as well as during the second and third trimesters. Breastfeeding should be withheld for three days after CSF administration to allow for clearance of it from the milk. People who have been administered colony-stimulating factors do not have a higher risk of leukemia than people who have not.

=== Stem cell transplants ===
G-CSF may also be given to the receiver in hematopoietic stem cell transplantation, to compensate for conditioning regimens.

== Side effects ==
The skin disease Sweet's syndrome is a known side effect of using this drug.

Bone and musculoskeletal pain is also a known side effect and seemingly common side effect.

== Pharmaceutical variants ==
The recombinant human G-CSF (rhG-CSF) synthesised in an E. coli expression system is called filgrastim. The structure of filgrastim differs slightly from the structure of the natural glycoprotein. Most published studies have used filgrastim.

The Food and Drugs Administration (FDA) first approved filgrastim on February 20, 1991, marketed by Amgen with the brand name Neupogen. It was initially approved to reduce the risk of infection in patients with non-myeloid malignancies who are taking myelosuppressive anti-cancer drugs associated with febrile neutropenia with fever.

Several bio-generic versions are now also available in markets such as Europe and Australia. Filgrastim (Neupogen) and PEG-filgrastim (Neulasta), or pegylated form of filgratim, are two commercially available forms of rhG-CSF. The pegylated form of filgratim form has a much longer half-life, reducing the necessity of daily injections.

The FDA approved the first biosimilar of Neulasta in June 2018. It is made by Mylan and sold as Fulphila.

Another form of rhG-CSF called lenograstim is synthesised in Chinese hamster ovary cells (CHO cells). As this is a mammalian cell expression system, lenograstim is indistinguishable from the 174-amino acid natural human G-CSF. No clinical or therapeutic consequences of the differences between filgrastim and lenograstim have yet been identified, but there are no formal comparative studies.

In 2015, filgrastim was included on the WHO Model List of Essential Medicines, a list containing the medications considered to be most effective and safe to meet the most important needs in a health system.

=== Research ===
G-CSF when given early after exposure to radiation may improve white blood cell counts, and is stockpiled for use in radiation incidents.

Mesoblast planned in 2004 to use G-CSF to treat heart degeneration by injecting it into the blood-stream, plus SDF (stromal cell-derived factor) directly to the heart.

G-CSF has been shown to reduce inflammation, reduce amyloid beta burden, and reverse cognitive impairment in a mouse model of Alzheimer's disease.

Due to its neuroprotective properties, G-CSF is currently under investigation for cerebral ischemia in a clinical phase IIb and several clinical pilot studies are published for other neurological disease such as amyotrophic lateral sclerosis A combination of human G-CSF and cord blood cells has been shown to reduce impairment from chronic traumatic brain injury in rats.

== History ==
Two research teams independently identified mouse colony stimulating factors in the 1960s: Ray Bradley at University of Melbourne and Donald Metcalf at Walter and Eliza Hall Institute, from Australia, and Yasuo Ichikawa, Dov Pluznik and Leo Sachs at the Weizmann Institute of Science, Israel. In 1980 Antony Burgess and Donald Metcalf discovered that mouse lung conditioned medium contained at least two different CSFs - GM-CSF, which they had purified in 1977 and a G-CSF which stimulated the production of colonies of neutrophils.

In 1983, Donald Metcalf's research team, led by Nicos Nicola, isolated the murine cytokine from medium conditioned with lung tissue obtained from endotoxin-treated mice.

In 1985, Karl Welte, Erich Platzer, Janice Gabrilove, Roland Mertelsmann and Malcolm Moore at the Memorial Sloan Kettering Cancer Center (MSK) purified human G-CSF produced by bladder cancer cell line 5637 from conditioned medium.

In 1986, Karl Welte's team at MSK patented the method of producing and using human G-CSF under the name "human hematopoietic pluripotent colony stimulating factor" or "human pluripotent colony stimulating factor" (P-CSF). Also in 1986, two independent research groups working with pharmaceutical companies cloned the G-CSF gene that made possible large-scale production and its clinical use: Shigekazu Nagata's team in collaboration with Chugai Pharmaceutical Co. from Japan, and Lawrence Souza's team at Amgen in collaboration with Karl Welte's research team members from Germany and the USA.

== See also ==
- PEGylation
