= Peginterferon alfa-2a =

Pharmaceutical drug

Clinical data
- Trade names: Pegasys, others
- AHFS/Drugs.com: Professional Drug Facts
- MedlinePlus: a605029
- License data: US DailyMed: Peginterferon_alfa-2a
- Pregnancy category: AU: B3
- Routes of administration: Subcutaneous injection
- ATC code: L03AB11 (WHO) L03AB61 (WHO) (in combinations)

Legal status
- Legal status: AU: S4 (Prescription only); UK: POM (Prescription only); US: ℞-only; EU: Rx-only; In general: ℞ (Prescription only)

Identifiers
- CAS Number: 198153-51-4; alfa-2b: 215647-85-1
- DrugBank: DB00008
- ChemSpider: none
- UNII: Q46947FE7K; alfa-2b: G8RGG88B68
- KEGG: D02748
- ChEMBL: ChEMBL1201560

Chemical and physical data
- Formula: C_{860}H_{1353}N_{227}O_{255}S_{9}
- Molar mass: 19241.16 g·mol^{−1}

Pegylated interferon alfa-2a, sold under the brand name Pegasys among others, is medication used to treat hepatitis C and hepatitis B. For hepatitis C it is typically used together with ribavirin and cure rates are between 24 and 92%. For hepatitis B it may be used alone. It is given by injection under the skin.

Side effects are common. They may include headache, feeling tired, depression, trouble sleeping, hair loss, nausea, pain at the site of injection, and fever. Severe side effects may include psychosis, autoimmune disorders, blood clots, or infections. Use with ribavirin is not recommended during pregnancy. Pegylated interferon alfa-2a is in the alpha interferon family of medications. It is pegylated to protect the molecule from breakdown.

Pegylated interferon alfa-2a was approved for medical use in the United States in 2002. It is on the World Health Organization's List of Essential Medicines.

== Medical uses ==
This drug is approved around the world for the treatment of chronic hepatitis C (including people with HIV co-infection, cirrhosis, 'normal' levels of ALT) and has recently been approved (in the EU, U.S., China and many other countries) for the treatment of chronic hepatitis B. It is also used in the treatment of certain T-cell lymphomas, particularly mycosis fungoides. Additionally, NCCN guidelines recommend peginterferon alfa-2a as a potential option for treatment of several myeloproliferative neoplasms, including essential thrombocythemia, primary myelofibrosis, and polycythemia vera, particularly in young patients or instances where hydroxyurea is contraindicated, such as pregnancy.

Peginterferon alfa-2a is a long acting interferon. Interferons are proteins released in the body in response to viral infections. Interferons are important for fighting viruses in the body, for regulating reproduction of cells, and for regulating the immune system.

=== Host genetic factors ===
For genotype 1 hepatitis C treated with pegylated interferon alfa-2a or pegylated interferon alfa-2b combined with ribavirin, it has been shown that genetic polymorphisms near the human IL28B gene, encoding interferon lambda 3, are associated with significant differences in response to the treatment. This finding, originally reported in Nature, showed genotype 1 hepatitis C patients carrying certain genetic variant alleles near the IL28B gene are more likely to achieve sustained virological response after the treatment than others. Another report in Nature demonstrated the same genetic variants are also associated with the natural clearance of the genotype 1 hepatitis C virus.

== Manufacturing ==
It is pegylated with a branched 40 kg/mol PEG chain.

== Availability ==
Peginterferon alfa-2a is manufactured under the brand name Pegasys. In 2021, Roche Pharmaceuticals sold the worldwide rights of Pegasys (excluding China and Japan) to zr pharma& GmbH (pharma&). In May 2022, Roche Australia transferred the sales and marketing of Pegasys to Echo Therapeutics Pty Ltd.

== Research ==
A Cochrane Review sought to determine whether interferon alfa-2a could be used as a treatment for individuals with neovascular age-related macular degeneration. They found no evidence of improved visual acuity with potential harm.
