= Immunostimulant =

Substance that stimulates the immune system

Immunostimulants, also known as immunostimulators, are substances (drugs and nutrients) that stimulate the immune system usually in a non-specific manner by inducing activation or increasing activity of any of its components. One notable example is the granulocyte macrophage colony-stimulating factor. The goal of this stimulated immune response is usually to help the body have a stronger immune system response in order to improve outcomes in the case of an infection or cancer malignancy. There is also some evidence that immunostimulants may be useful to help decrease severe acute illness related to chronic obstructive pulmonary disease or acute infections in the lungs.

== Classification ==
There are two main categories of immunostimulants:

1. Specific immunostimulants provide antigenic specificity in immune response, such as vaccines or any antigen.
2. Non-specific immunostimulants act irrespective of antigenic specificity to augment immune response of other antigen or stimulate components of the immune system without antigenic specificity, such as adjuvants and non-specific immunostimulators.

=== Non-specific ===
Many endogenous substances are non-specific immunostimulators. For example, female sex hormones are known to stimulate both adaptive and innate immune responses. Some autoimmune diseases such as lupus erythematosus strike women preferentially, and their onset often coincides with puberty. Other hormones appear to regulate the immune system as well, most notably prolactin, growth hormone and vitamin D.

Some publications point towards the effect of deoxycholic acid (DCA) as an immunostimulant of the non-specific immune system, activating its main actors, the macrophages. According to these publications, a sufficient amount of DCA in the human body corresponds to a good immune reaction of the non-specific immune system.

Claims made by marketers of various products and alternative health providers, such as chiropractors, homeopaths, and acupuncturists to be able to stimulate or "boost" the immune system generally lack meaningful explanation and evidence of effectiveness.

== Uses ==
Immunostimulants have been recommended to help prevent acute illness related to chronic obstructive pulmonary disease and they are sometimes used to treat chronic bronchitis. The evidence in the form of high quality clinical trials to support their use is weak, however, there is some evidence of benefit and they appear to be safe. The most commonly used immunostimulant type for this purpose are bacterial-derived immunostimulants. The goal is to stimulate the person's immune system in order to prevent future infections that may result in an acute episode or exacerbation of COPD.

== See also ==
=== General ===
- Antigen
- Co-stimulation
- Immunogenicity
- Immunologic adjuvant
- Immunomodulator
- Immunotherapy

=== Endogenous immunostimulants ===
- Deoxycholic acid, a stimulator of macrophages

=== Synthetic immunostimulants ===
- Imiquimod and resiquimod, activate immune cells through the toll-like receptor 7
