= Interferon tau =

Identifiers
- Organism: Bos taurus
- Symbol: IFNT2
- Alt. symbols: IFNT; IFNT1; TP-1
- Entrez: 317698
- RefSeq (mRNA): NM_001015511.4
- RefSeq (Prot): NP_001015511.3
- UniProt: P15696

Other data
- Chromosome: 8: 22.61 - 22.61 Mb
Search for
- Structures: Swiss-model
- Domains: InterPro

Interferon tau (IFNτ, IFNT) is a Type I interferon made of a single chain of amino acids. IFN-τ was first discovered in ruminants as the signal for the maternal recognition of pregnancy and originally named ovine trophoblast protein-1 (oTP-1). It has many physiological functions in the mammalian uterus, and also has anti-inflammatory effect that aids in the protection of the semi-allogeneic conceptus trophectoderm from the maternal immune system.

IFN-τ genes have only been found in ruminants that belong to the Artidactyla order, and multiple polymorphisms and several variants of IFN-τ have been identified. Although IFN-τ has been shown not to be produced in humans, both human and mouse cells respond to its effects. IFN-τ binds to the same IFN receptors as IFN-α and induces intracellular signalling through STAT1, STAT2, and Tyk2. This leads to the production of antiviral and immunomodulatory cytokines, including IL-4, IL-6, and IL-10.

== Structure ==
IFN-τ consists of 172 amino acids with two disulfide bridges (1–99, 29–139) and amino terminal proline. Similar to other Type I interferons, IFN-τ binds to the Interferon-alpha/beta receptor (IFNAR).

Its molecular weight is between 19 and 24 kDa, depending on glycosylation state. Not all variants of IFN-τ are glycosylated. Bovine IFN-τ is N-glycosylated at ASN78, caprine IFN-τ is a combination between nonglycosylated and glycosylated forms and ovine IFN-τ is not glycosylated. Receptor binding site can be found at the C-terminus, biologically active site is located at the N-terminus.

Compared to other interferons, IFN-τ shares about 75% of its identity to IFN-ω, which can be found quite commonly in mammals. However, Southern blot analysis and genome sequencing data proved that genes encoding IFN-τ can be found only in ruminant species. Studies also show 85% sequence identity between human trophoblast IFN in placental trophoblast cells and IFN-τ.

== Function and biological activity ==
IFN-τ is constitutively secreted by trophoblast and endometrial cells during ovine pregnancy. Its secretion begins around tenth day and increases between days 13 and 16, when it reaches its peak, and then stopping after day 24 of pregnancy. IFN-τ is essential to maintain the levels of progesterone production by the corpus luteum for the maternal recognition of pregnancy, and together with progesterone increases expression of genes for transport of nutrients into the uterine lumen, growth factors for hematopoiesis and angiogenesis and other molecules that are crucial for implantation and placentation. It has both endocrine and paracrine effects, immunomodulatory influence on several types of cells including neutrophils, and antiproliferative, antiluteolytic and immunosuppressive effects on the endometrium.

IFN-τ binds to IFNAR cell membrane receptor and induces dimerization of its subunits, IFNAR1 and IFNAR2, which leads to activation of canonical and noncanonical signaling pathways. The canonical pathway involves Janus kinase-signal transducer and activator of transcription-interferon regulatory factor (JAK-STAT-IRF) signaling. This leads to induction of classical interferon stimulated genes (ISGs). The noncanonical signaling pathway includes mitogen-activated protein kinase (MAPK) and phosphatidylinositol 3-kinase thymoma viral proto-onco- gene 1 (PI3K-AKT1) cascades.

IFN-τ can also stimulate expression of interleukins IL-6 and IL-8. However, the mechanism is not STAT1, but STAT3 dependent.

Synthetic gene for ovine IFN-τ was produced using Pichia pastoris yeast system. The recombinant IFN-τ had the same antiviral, antiluteolytic and immunosuppressive properties as native IFN-τ.

== Clinical use ==
Understanding the role of IFN-τ in pregnancy recognition in ruminants and its mechanism of action led to its use in pregnancy diagnosis, as it can be measured directly from blood, and knowledge of its actions can be used to improve the reproductive efficiency in ruminants.

Since the effects of IFN-τ are not limited to ruminants and pregnancy, it has been studied for its anti-inflammatory properties as a treatment for diabetes. NOD mice that were treated with IFN-τ, which was administered either orally, intraperitoneally, or subcutaneously, have shown delayed or even inhibited development of diabetes.

IFN-τ is able to inhibit human immunodeficiency virus replication in vitro more effectively than human IFN-α. It was observed that IFN-τ decreased intracellular HIV RNA in human macrophages and inhibited reverse transcription of viral RNA into proviral DNA. Because of difference in both selectivity of individual N-termini towards receptors and different degree of receptor avidity, IFN-τ displays much less cytotoxicity than IFNT-α. This can be useful in treatment of viral diseases. IFN-τ has also demonstrated biological effects against influenza virus. However, IFN-τ has high species specificity which can cause a significant decrease in biological activity when administered to another species.
