= Wolf Prize in Agriculture =

One of six awards by the Wolf Foundation

The Wolf Prize in Agriculture has been awarded by the Wolf Foundation in Israel since 1978. It is one of the six Wolf Prizes, alongside those for chemistry, mathematics, medicine, physics and arts. It is sometimes unofficially called a Nobel Prize in Agriculture.

== Laureates ==
Year	Name	Nationality	Citation
1978	George F. Sprague	United States	for his outstanding research on the genetic amelioration of maize for human welfare.
1978	John Charles Walker	United States	for his research in plant pathology, developing of disease-resistant varieties of major food plants.
1979	Jay L. Lush	United States	for his outstanding and pioneering contributions to the application of genetics to livestock improvement.
1979	Kenneth Blaxter	United Kingdom	for his fundamental contributions to the science and practice of ruminant nutrition and livestock production.
1980	Karl Maramorosch	United States	for his pioneering and wide-ranging studies on interactions between insects and disease agents in plants.
1981	John O. Almquist	United States	for his significant contributions to the application of artificial insemination to livestock improvement.
1981	Henry A. Lardy	United States	for his pioneering research on storage and preservation of spermatozoa thus enabling artificial insemination to become a universal practice.
1981	Glenn W. Salisbury	United States	for his outstanding achievements in basic and applied research on artificial insemination.
1982	Wendell L. Roelofs	United States	for his fundamental chemical and biological research on pheromones and their practical use in insect control.
1983/4	Don Kirkham; Cornelis T. de Wit	United States; Netherlands	for their innovative contributions to the quantitative understanding of soil-water and other environmental interactions influencing crop growth and yield.
1984/5	Robert H. Burris	United States	for his pioneering fundamental research on the mechanisms of biological nitrogen fixation and its application in crop production.
1986	Ralph Riley; Ernest R. Sears	United Kingdom; United States	for their fundamental research in cytogenetics of wheat, providing the basis for genetic improvement of cereal grains.
1987	Theodor O. Diener	United States	for his discovery and pioneering fundamental research on viroids and his applied work on viroid detection in crops.
1988	Charles Thibault; Ernest John Christopher Polge	France; United Kingdom	for pioneering work in reproductive physiology including cell preservation, fertilization processes, egg biology and embryo manipulations for domestic animal improvement.
1989	Peter M. Biggs; Michael Elliott	United Kingdom; United Kingdom	for distinguished contributions to basic science and its successful translation into practice in the fields of animal health and crop protection.
1990	Jozef Stefaan Schell	Belgium	for his pioneering work in genetic transformation of plants, thereby opening up new horizons in basic plant science and breeding.
1991	Shang Fa Yang	Taiwan / United States	for his remarkable contributions to the understanding of the mechanism of biosynthesis, mode of action and applications of the plant hormone ethylene.
1992	No award	—	—
1993	John E. Casida	United States	for his pioneering studies on the mode of action of insecticides, design of safer pesticides and contributions to the understanding of nerve and muscle function in insects.
1994/5	Carl B. Huffaker; Perry Adkisson	United States; United States	for their contributions to the development and implementation of environmentally beneficial integrated pest management systems for the protection of agricultural crops.
1995/6	Morris Schnitzer; Frank J. Stevenson	Canada; United States	for their pioneering contributions to our understanding of the chemistry of soil organic matter and its application to agriculture.
1996/7	Neal L. First	United States	for his pioneering research in the reproductive biology of livestock.
1998	Ilan Chet; Baldur R. Stefansson	Israel; Canada	for their contributions to the environmentally safe development of world agriculture through innovative approaches in breeding and bio-control.
1999	No award	—	—
2000	Gurdev Khush	India	for his extraordinary contribution to theoretical research in plant genetics, evolution and breeding especially of rice, with regard to food production and alleviation of hunger.
2001	Roger N. Beachy; James E. Womack	United States; United States	for the use of recombinant DNA technology to revolutionize plant and animal sciences, paving the way for applications to neighboring fields.
2002/3	R. Michael Roberts; Fuller W. Bazer	United Kingdom / United States; United States	for discoveries of Interferon tau and other pregnancy-associated proteins, which clarified the biological mystery of signaling between embryo and mother to maintain pregnancy, with profound effects on the efficiency of animal production systems, as well as human health and well-being.
2004	Yuan Longping; Steven D. Tanksley	China; United States	for innovative development of hybrid rice and discovery of the genetic basis of heterosis in this important food staple.
2005	No award	—	—
2006/7	Ronald L. Phillips; Michel A. J. Georges	United States; Belgium	for groundbreaking discoveries in genetics and genomics, laying the foundations for improvements in crop and livestock breeding, and sparking important advances in plant and animal sciences.
2008	John A. Pickett; James H. Tumlinson; W. Joe Lewis	United Kingdom; United States; United States	for their remarkable discoveries of mechanisms governing plant-insect and plant-plant interactions. Their scientific contributions on chemical ecology have fostered the development of integrated pest management and significantly advanced agricultural sustainability.
2009	No award	—	—
2010	David Baulcombe	United Kingdom	for his pioneering discovery of gene regulation by small inhibitory RNA molecules in plants, which is of profound importance not only for agriculture, but also for biology as a whole, including the field of medicine.
2011	Harris A. Lewin	United States	for highly significant discoveries that contribute to both fundamental and practical aspects of animal agriculture.
2011	R. James Cook	United States	for seminal discoveries in plant pathology and soil microbiology that impact crop productivity and disease management.
2012	No award	—	—
2013	Joachim Messing	Germany / United States	for innovations in recombinant DNA cloning, which revolutionized agriculture, and for deciphering the genetic codes of crop plants.
2013	Jared Diamond	United States	for pioneering theories of crop domestication, the rise of agriculture and its influences on the development and demise of human societies, and its impact on the ecology of the environment.
2014	Jorge Dubcovsky; Leif Andersson	Argentina / United States; Sweden	for their breakthrough contribution to the study of plants and animals through the use of cutting-edge genomic technologies.
2015	Linda J. Saif	United States	for her discoveries of novel enteric and respiratory viruses of food animals and humans which have led to her extensive contributions of fundamental knowledge of the gut-mammary immunologic axis and have provided new ways to design vaccines and vaccination strategies.
2016	Trudy Mackay	United States	for her work in quantitative genetics, which studies the interaction between genes, traits and environmental effects.
2017	No award	—	—
2018	Gene E. Robinson	United States	for leading the genomics revolution in the organismal and population biology of the honeybee.
2019	David Zilberman	United States	for incorporating biophysical features of agroeconomic systems to develop economic models and econometric decision-making frameworks to answer fundamental agricultural economic and policy questions.
2020	Caroline Dean	United Kingdom	for pioneering discoveries in flowering time control and epigenetic basis of vernalization.
2021	No award	—	—
2022	Pamela C. Ronald	United States	for pioneering work on disease resistance and environmental stress tolerance in rice.
2023	Martinus Theodorus van Genuchten	Brazil / Netherlands	for his groundbreaking work in understanding water flow and predicting contaminant transport in soils.
2024	Joanne Chory; Elliot M. Meyerowitz; Venkatesan Sundaresan	United States; United States; India / United States	for key discoveries on plant developmental biology of relevance to crop improvement.
2025	Jeffery L. Dangl; Jonathan D. G. Jones; Brian J. Staskawicz	United States; United Kingdom; United States	for groundbreaking discoveries of the immune system and disease resistance in plants.
2026	No award	—	—

=== By country ===
Below is a chart of all laureates by country (updated to 2025). Some with several countries are counted several times.

Country	Number of laureates
United States	41
United Kingdom	10
Canada	2
Belgium	2
India	2
Netherlands	2
Brazil	1
Argentina	1
Israel	1
China	1
Germany	1
France	1
Taiwan	1
Sweden	1

== See also ==
- List of agriculture awards
