= R. Michael Roberts =

American biologist

- Born: 23 October 1940; Menston
- Education: University of Oxford, Lincoln College
- Works: Interferon tau
- Awards: Wolf Prize in Agriculture (United Kingdom, for discoveries of Interferon tau and other pregnancy-associated proteins, which clarified the biological mystery of signaling between embryo and mother to maintain pregnancy, with profound effects on the efficiency of animal production systems, as well as human health and well-being., 2002); Fellow of the American Association for the Advancement of Science (2015)
- Website: robertslab.missouri.edu
- Academic career
- Fields: Embryology, developmental biology
- Institutions: University of Missouri; University of Florida
- Thesis: The utilisation of ¹⁴C labelled substrates by growing plant organs
- Doctoral advisor: Vernon S. Butt
- Doctoral students: James C. Cross

R. Michael Roberts (born October 23, 1940, in Menston, United Kingdom) is an American biologist who is the Chancellor's Professor Emeritus of Animal sciences and Biochemistry at the University of Missouri. He is a founding co-editor of the Annual Review of Animal Biosciences, first published in 2013.

== Birth and education ==
R. Michael Roberts was born on October 23, 1940, in Menston, in the United Kingdom. He graduated with a BA in Botany and PhD in Plant Physiology/Biochemistry from the University of Oxford. His DPhil thesis was entitled The utilisation of ¹⁴C labelled substrates by growing plant organs (1965) and was supervised by Vernon S. Butt.

== Academic career ==
In September 1965 Roberts went to the United States to do post-doctoral work with Frank Loewus at State University of New York-Buffalo (SUNY). Roberts was a faculty member in the Department of Biochemistry, University of Florida from 1970-1985.

In 1985, Roberts joined the University of Missouri. He served as Chair of the Veterinary Pathobiology Department the University of Missouri from 1995 to 1998. He was named the Curators’ Distinguished Professor of Animal Sciences, Biochemistry, and Veterinary Pathobiology as of 1996 and was the Chancellor's Professor as of 2019. He is currently Chancellor's Professor Emeritus of Animal Sciences and Biochemistry. Roberts served as the founding director of the MU Life Sciences Center from January 2004-September 2005.

Roberts served as Chief Scientist for the USDA’s National Research Initiative Competitive Grants Program (NRI) from 1998-2000. He also served on the National Research Council (NRC) Committee on Defining Science-Based Concerns Associated with Products of Animal Biotechnology, addressing concerns about the use of genetically modified animals for food, which published the report Animal Biotechnology: Science-Based Concerns (2002). and chaired the NRC committee that investigated Animal Care & Management at the National Zoo.

In 2006-2007 R. Michael Roberts was investigated by The University of Missouri for research misconduct based on images that had been altered in a 2006 Science paper where he was the principal investigator. In brief, a postdoctoral fellow Dr. Kaushik Deb fabricated and falsified digital images that supported a paper published in Science. That paper was subsequently withdrawn, and the prescribed university procedures for a research misconduct investigation were followed. The Standing Committee on Research Responsibility concluded that Dr. Deb had committed the misconduct alone, and that the co-authors on the paper (Drs. R. M. Roberts, M. Sivaguru and H.Y. Yong) were in no way culpable. The Office of Research Integrity at the National Institutes of Health now formally agrees with that conclusion (ORI2006-09). The paper was officially retracted by Roberts and an apology to the scientific community was issued in the form of a published letter.

== Research ==
R. Michael Roberts is known for his contributions to identification of the biological mechanism of embryo-maternal signaling in ruminants, in which signals indicating the existence of the embryo lead to the maintenance of an optimal uterine environment for pregnancy and the embryo's survival. In mammals, chemical signalling between the embryo and the mother was known to be essential in sustaining a successful pregnancy. However, details of the process were not understood until R. Michael Roberts and Fuller W. Bazer began a 16-year collaboration to study such relationships. In addition to their joint efforts, each has made independent contributions, at their respective universities.

Among his key discoveries, R. Michael Roberts determined the equivalence of uteroferrin and a class of lysosomal enzymes, known as tartrate-resistant acid phosphatases (TRAPs). Subsequently, Roberts was the first to successfully purify, sequence and clone TRAPs in humans. As a result of this research, postmenopausal women are being screened for TRAP, which can be associated with osteoporosis.

Roberts' group was the first to clone, identify, and characterize the temporal expression of trophoblast interferon-t in the ruminants sheep and cattle. He studied differential transcriptional regulation of interferon-t by the transcription factors ETS-2 and Oct-4. He proposed a developmental switch to explain the formation of trophectoderm during early embryo development. He has identified more than 100 expressed genes for proteins in the aspartyl proteinase gene family, associated with pregnancy. This work has formed the basis for developing a pregnancy test for dairy cattle. His research on sexual dimorphism in embryos suggests that maternal diet around conception may influence an offspring’s sex.

Roberts changed research direction in 2003. He began to focus on the use of pluripotent stem cells and the development of models to study the emergence and differentiation of animal and human trophoblast. Among his group's contributions is a study on the importance of low oxygen atmospheres to control human stem cell differentiation. His laboratory was one of the first to describe the generation of induced pluripotent stem cells from an ungulate species, the pig. As of 2018, he was studying preeclampsia by generating iPS cell lines using human umbilical cords. Roberts' work is supported through Federal Agencies such as the National Institutes of Health (NIH) and the United States Department of Agriculture (USDA), and through Missouri's state funding for agriculture.

== Awards and honors ==
- 2021, Distinguished Fellow, Society for the Study of Reproduction (SSR).
- 2021, Marshall Medal, Society for Reproduction and Fertility (SRF)
- 2021, Gold Medal and Honorable Membership of the Animal Reproduction Branch of the Chinese Association of Animal Science and Veterinary Medicine (CAAV).
- 2015, Fellow, American Association for the Advancement of Science (AAAS)
- 2006, Carl G. Hartman Award, Society for the Study of Reproduction.
- 2003, Wolf Prize in Agriculture with Fuller W. Bazer "for discoveries of Interferon-t and other pregnancy-associated proteins, which clarified the biological mystery of signaling between embryo and mother to maintain pregnancy, with profound effects on the efficiency of animal production systems, as well as human health and well-being".
- 1996, Fellow, National Academy of Sciences
- 1995, Milstein Award, International Society for Interferon and Cytokine Research, for research on Interferons
- 1990, SSR Research Award, with Fuller W. Bazer, Society for the Study of Reproduction
