= Maternal recognition of pregnancy =

Crucial aspect of carrying a pregnancy to full term

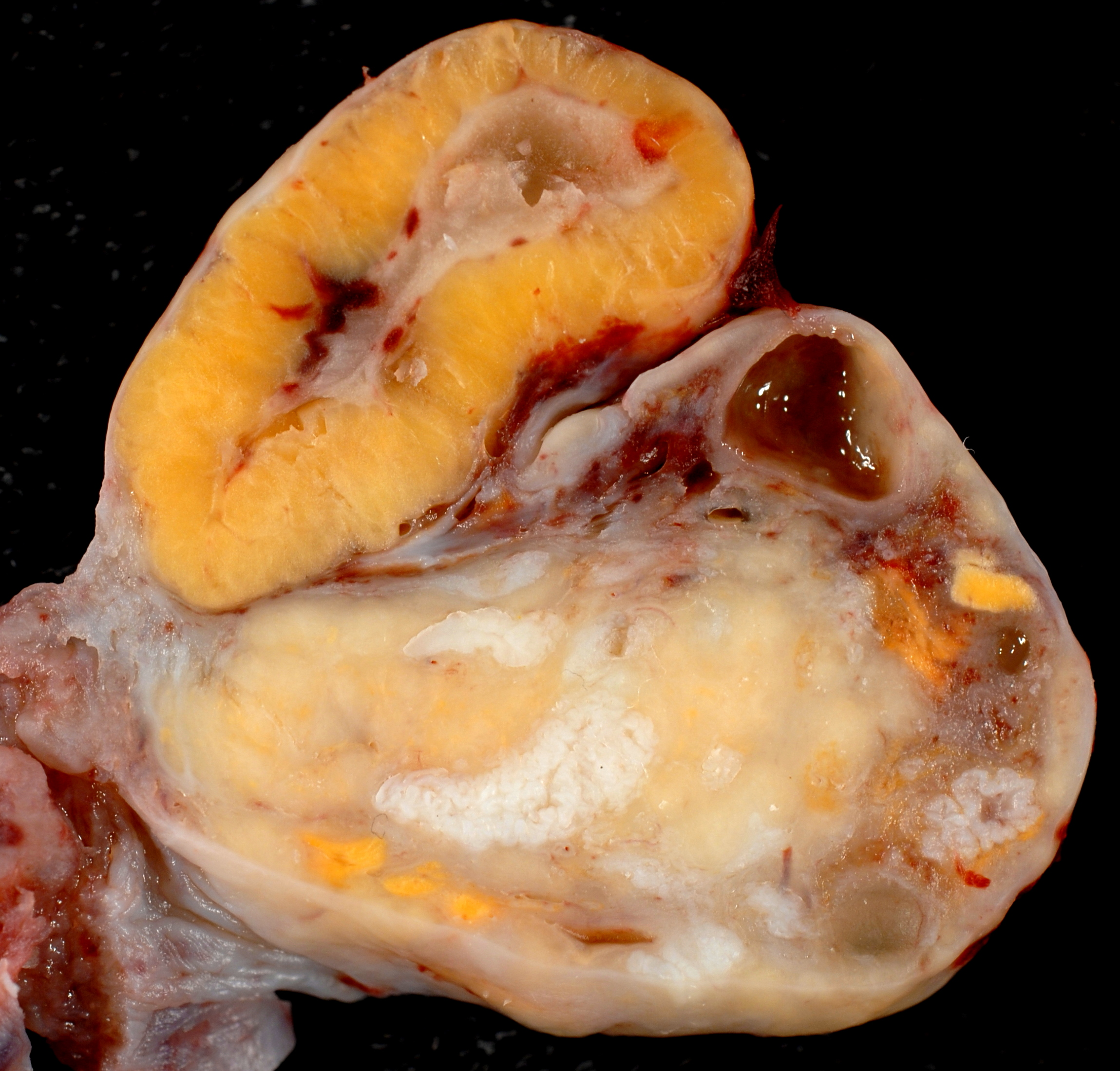
Human ovary with developed corpus luteum

Maternal recognition of pregnancy is a crucial aspect of carrying a pregnancy to full term. Without maternal recognition to maintain pregnancy, the initial messengers which stop luteolysis and promote foetal implantation, growth and uterine development finish with nothing to replace them and the pregnancy is lost.

Pregnancy maintenance relies on the continued production of progesterone which is initially produced by the corpus luteum (CL). A hormone secreting structure that develops on the ovary after ovulation. Maternal recognition of pregnancy differs between species, however they all include a signal to prevent luteolysis, which then prevents the resumption of menstrual or oestrous cycles.

Luteolysis is the regression of the corpus luteum. The process is identified by the decline of progesterone and it signifies the absence of pregnancy following ovulation. In the non pregnant uterus, the decline of progesterone allows the return of oestrogen, resulting in the upregulation of oxytocin receptors and consequently pulsatile release of PGF2α. In turn, luteolysis is induced. This regression allows the continuation of the menstrual cycle.

However, if pregnancy is established, luteolysis is evaded via maternal recognition of pregnancy because high levels of progesterone are maintained by the CL and the placental hormone hCG further maintains the CL.

== Mechanisms of recognition ==
=== Human ===
Progesterone released from the corpus luteum is promoted by human chorionic gonadotrophin (hCG) produced by the cells of the trophoblast, the outer layer of cells of the early embryo.

=== Sheep and cow ===
In most ruminant species, interferon tau has been identified as the signal for maternal recognition of pregnancy. Interferon tau is therefore also referred to as an anti luteolytic factor, essential for the maintenance of the corpus luteum.

Interferon tau is secreted by the trophectoderm of the blastocyst from around day 10 in ovine species and from day 15 in bovine species. Interferon tau acts on the endometrial cells of the maternal uterus to prevent the production of the luteolytic factor, PGF2ɑ. The inhibition of PGF2ɑ production is the result of a change in gene expression. Interferon tau inhibits the transcription of the oxytocin receptor gene in both sheep and cows, and also the oestrogen receptor ɑ gene in sheep. The absence of these receptors in the cells of the endometrium prevents the pulsatile release of PGF2ɑ.
