= Fuller W. Bazer =

American animal scientist

Fuller Bazer
- Education: North Carolina State University
- Awards: Wolf Prize in Agriculture
- Scientific career
- Fields: Animal Science
- Workplaces: Texas A&M University (current), University of Florida (former)

Fuller W. Bazer (born 1938) is an American animal scientist and a Regents Fellow, Distinguished Professor, and O.D. Butler Chair in Animal Science at Texas A&M University.

== Birth and education ==
Fuller W. Bazer was born in 1938 in Shreveport, Louisiana. He graduated from C.E. Byrd High School in Shreveport, LA, in 1956 and was inducted into the Byrd Alumni Hall of Fame in 2002. He received his BS in biology from Centenary College in Shreveport, LA; and his Masters at Louisiana State University. He completed his Ph.D. in animal science from North Carolina State University. He was a graduate research professor in animal science and pediatrics at the University of Florida before moving to Texas A&M University in 1992.

== Research ==
Bazer is known for his contributions in the biological mystery of embryo-maternal signaling, which maintain pregnancy and survival of the embryo in livestock species.

It was known that chemical communication between embryo and mother was essential for successful pregnancy in mammals. However, little was known about the details before R. Michael Roberts and Fuller W. Bazer collaborated. Among his key discoveries, Fuller isolated the uterine protein uteroferrin, a hematopoietic growth factor that influences the survival of the neonate and may be useful in treating diseases, such as leukemia and osteoporosis. He determined that estrogen in pigs and interferon-t in ruminant species are the signals for pregnancy maintenance. The ability of interferon-t to suppress transcription of the estrogen receptor gene, provides a model for the potential treatment of estrogen-dependent tumors.

== Awards and honors ==
- 1980: American Society of Animal Science Award in Physiology and Endocrinology
- 2003: Wolf Prize in Agriculture along with R. Michael Roberts "for discoveries of Interferon-t and other pregnancy-associated proteins, which clarified the biological mystery of signaling between embryo and mother to maintain pregnancy, with profound effects on the efficiency of animal production systems, as well as human health and well-being".
- 1996: Gamma Sigma Delta International Distinguished Achievement Award in Agriculture
- 2004: Carl Hartman award from the Society for the Study of Reproduction
