= R. James Cook =

American phytopathologist (born 1937)

- Born: 1937 (age 88–89); Moorhead, Minnesota, U.S.
- Education: University of North Dakota; University of California, Berkeley
- Partner: Beverly Ann Miller
- Children: 4
- Scientific career
- Institutions: Washington State University

Robert James Cook (born 1937) is an American phytopathologist (plant disease researcher). He is best known for his work on soil-borne pathogens affecting wheat. He is the recipient of a Guggenheim Fellowship and the Wolf Prize in Agriculture and is a member of the National Academy of Sciences.

== Early life and education ==
Robert James Cook was born in 1937 in northwestern Minnesota. He was the eldest of eight children born to his parents, Irene née Klug and Robert Donald Cook. He and his family lived on a 400 acres (160 ha) farm near the North Dakota border where they grew grain. Initially, Cook intended on becoming a farmer, and attended North Dakota State University for a degree in animal science and agronomy. During his undergraduate degree, he worked for a plant virologist, which inspired him to rethink his plans for the future. He stayed at North Dakota State for a master's degree in plant pathology in 1960. For his PhD, he attended the University of California, Berkeley to research soil-borne pathogens; he graduated with his doctorate in 1964. His dissertation was about the interactions and life cycle of Fusarium, a genus of fungi that live in the soil and sometimes cause root disease.

== Career ==
Cook joined the faculty at Washington State University in 1965 as part of the USDA Agricultural Research Service. He was hired to research diseases that affect the roots of wheat plants and appropriate control strategies. One of his early findings was that the disease take-all could be controlled by continuously planting wheat, which eventually caused the soil to suppress the causative fungus. He was the editor of the Annual Review of Phytopathology from 1985–1994. Cook retired from Washington State University in 2005, at which time he became a professor emeritus.

== Personal life ==
Cook married Beverly Ann Miller; the couple had four children together.

== Awards and honors ==
Cook was awarded a Guggenheim Fellowship in 1973. In 1993 he was inducted as a member of the National Academy of Sciences. In 1998, the R. James Cook Endowed Chair in Wheat Research was established by wheat farmers in Washington with a $1.5 million endowment. In 2011 he received the Wolf Prize in Agriculture along with Harris Lewin. He is the namesake of the R.J. Cook Agronomy Farm, just east of the WSU campus in Pullman. He is also part of the Agricultural Research Service Hall of Fame.
