= Frank Stephenson (disambiguation) =

Frank Stephenson is an American automobile designer.

Frank or Francis Stephenson may also refer to:

- Frank Stephenson (saloon keeper) (fl.1860–1885), American saloon keeper
- Frank Stephenson (footballer) (born 1934), Australian rules footballer
- Frank Stephenson (ice hockey), American ice hockey goaltender
- Francis Stephenson (born 1976), English rugby league player

== See also ==
- Frank Stevenson (disambiguation)
- Francis Seymour Stevenson (1862–1938), British Liberal Party politician, author and scholar
