= Corpus hemorrhagicum =

Details

Identifiers
- Latin: corpus haemorrhagicum

The corpus hemorrhagicum ("bleeding corpus luteum") is a temporary structure formed immediately after ovulation from the ovarian follicle as it collapses and is filled with blood that quickly clots. After the trauma heals, the subsequent structure is called the corpus luteum (which in turn becomes the corpus albicans before degenerating). Sometimes during ovulation, small blood vessels rupture, and the cavity of the ruptured follicle fills with a blood clot, a corpus hemorrhagicum.
