= Frank Stevenson =

Frank Stevenson may refer to:

- Frank A. Stevenson, software developer
- Frank Stevenson, character in The Ambassador (1984 American film)
- Frank J. Stevenson, agriculture Scientist.

== See also ==
- Francis Seymour Stevenson (1862–1938), British Liberal Party politician, author and scholar
- Frank Stephenson (disambiguation)
