= Michel A. J. Georges =

Belgian biologist

Michel A. J. Georges (1959) is a Belgian biologist and a professor at the University of Liège.

== Birth and education ==
Michel A. J. Georges was born in 1959 in Schoten, Belgium. He received his Doctor in Veterinary Medicine from the University of Liège in 1983, and his M.Sc. in Molecular Biology from the Université libre de Bruxelles in 1985.

== Research ==
Michel A. J. Georges is known for his research in the field of animal genetics and genomics, and in the development of tools and strategies for increasing the efficiency of genome analysis for livestock improvement. He has applied his methods to the identification and mapping of genes affecting economically important single-gene (e.g. polled, double-muscling, callipyge, weaver, congenital muscular distonia), as well as complex multi-gene traits (e.g. milk and fattening yield and quality, fertility, disease resistance). He has also established working relationships with the major breeding organizations in many countries, helping them to apply the results of his discoveries on a large scale, using so-called marker assisted selection to accelerate the otherwise slow process of farm animal improvement. He is also a pioneer in opening up the field of epigenetics for animals, a hereditary form that does not conform to simple Mendelian rules. He is considered a giant within the animal genetics and genomics community, both for his genius and for generously sharing his ideas.

== Awards and honors ==
Michel A. J. Georges was awarded the Wolf Prize in Agriculture in 2007 along with Ronald L. Phillips of the University of Liège "for groundbreaking discoveries in genetics and genomics, laying the foundations for improvements in crop and livestock breeding, and sparking important advances in plant and animal sciences". In 2008 he was awarded the Francqui Prize.

He is also a member of the Belgian Royal Academy of Medicine.
