= Ronald L. Phillips =

American biologist (1940–2023)

- Born: United States
- Education: Purdue University
- Awards: Wolf Prize in Agriculture, AAAS Fellow
- Scientific career
- Fields: Cytogenetics, plant biology
- Workplaces: University of Minnesota
- Thesis: "Cytogenetic studies of recombination in reciprocal crosses and the location of genes in Zea mays L." (1966)
- Doctoral advisor: Charles Burnham

Ronald Lewis Phillips (1940 – 25 August 2023) was an American biologist and a regents professor at the University of Minnesota. In 1985 he was elected a fellow and the American Association for the Advancement of Science and in 1991 he was elected to the National Academy of Sciences.

== Education and career ==
Phillips completed his B.S. and M.S. degrees from Purdue University. After completing his master's degree, moved to the University of Minnesota where he studied maize cytogenetics advised by Charles Burnham, graduating in 1966. After completing his PhD, he spent a short time as a postdoc at Cornell University. Since 1967, he has been a professor at the University of Minnesota. Officially retiring in 2010, he is now Regents Professor Emeritus at the University of Minnesota.

== Research ==
Ronald L. Phillips was the first to generate whole corn plants from cells grown in culture, which laid the foundation for, and sparked, a new industry, using cell-culture methods to genetically modify corn plants and other cereals. The corn cell line which is most widely used for genetic modification of corn has greatly accelerated the improvement of corn, as food, feed and fuel.

His research program at the University of Minnesota was one of the early programs in modern plant biotechnology related to agriculture. Research in the Phillips laboratory have further led to the identification of cells and plants with increased levels of essential amino acids and the development of an efficient DNA sequence mapping system used by plant scientists in genomics research.

He found was possible to introgress individual maize chromosomes into oat, where they were stably inherited. His lab generated a set nine oat lines each carrying the complete oat genome plus one maize chromosome

== Recognition ==
In 2006/7, he was awarded the Wolf Prize in Agriculture along with Michel A. J. Georges of the University of Liège "for groundbreaking discoveries in genetics and genomics, laying the foundations for improvements in crop and livestock breeding, and sparking important advances in plant and animal sciences".

In 2010 Phillips received the ISA Medal for Science from the University of Bologna and the Siehl Prize from the University of Minnesota.

== See also ==
- Selcuk Adabag
