= Jorge Dubcovsky =

American agricultural researcher

- Awards: Wolf Prize in Agriculture

Academic background
- Education: University of Buenos Aires
- Influences: Jan Dvorak

Academic work
- Institutions: University of California, Davis
- Main interests: biologist
- Notable ideas: plant genetics, wheat genetics

Jorge Dubcovsky is a plant geneticist and biologist at the University of California, Davis. He is an investigator with the Howard Hughes Medical Institute. Dubcovsky's research focuses on wheat genomics. In 2013, he was elected to the National Academy of Sciences. In 2014, Dubcovsky won the Wolf Prize in Agriculture alongside Leif Andersson.

== Early life ==
Dubcovsky graduated from the University of Buenos Aires in 1984 with a degree in biological sciences. He completed his Ph.D. at the University of Buenos Aires and began studying wheat genetics at the University of California, Davis in 1992. In 2004, research led by Dubcovsky culminated in the identification and cloning of the VRN2 gene in winter wheat.
