= Annual Review of Animal Biosciences =

- Discipline: Veterinary medicine Biotechnology; Zoology
- Language: English
- Edited by: Harris A. Lewin; R. Michael Roberts

Publication details
- History: 2013–present, 13 years old
- Publisher: Annual Reviews (US)
- Frequency: Annually
- Open access: Subscribe to Open
- Impact factor: 12.3 (2025)

Standard abbreviations
- ISO 4: Annu. Rev. Anim. Biosci.

Indexing
- ISSN: 2165-8102 (print); 2165-8110 (web)

Links
- Journal homepage

The Annual Review of Animal Biosciences is a peer-reviewed scientific journal published by Annual Reviews (AR). It releases an annual volume of review articles relevant to the fields of zoology, veterinary medicine, animal husbandry, and conservation biology. It has been in publication since 2013. The co-editors are Harris A. Lewin and R. Michael Roberts. As of 2023, Annual Review of Animal Biosciences is being published as open access, under the Subscribe to Open model. As of 2026, Journal Citation Reports lists the journal's impact factor for 2025 as 12.3. It was rated number one of 181 titles in Zoology, number one of 86 in "Agriculture, Dairy, and Animal Sciences", number one of 170 in "Veterinary Science" and number eight of 177 titles in "Biotechnology and Applied Microbiology".

== History ==
The Annual Review of Animal Biosciences was first published in 2013 by Annual Reviews (AR), a nonprofit organization whose stated mission is to synthesize knowledge "for the progress of science and the benefit of society". Harris A. Lewin and R. Michael Roberts were the founding co-editors. Though it was initially published in print, as of 2021 it is only published electronically.

== Scope and indexing ==
The Annual Review of Animal Biosciences defines its scope as covering significant developments relevant to biotechnology, genomics, genetics, veterinary medicine, animal breeding, and conservation biology. The intended audience for the journal is scientists and veterinarians involved with wild and domestic animals. It is abstracted and indexed in Scopus, Science Citation Index Expanded, MEDLINE, and Embase, among others.
