= Neal L. First =

American biologist

- Born: October 8, 1930
- Died: November 20, 2014 (aged 84)
- Education: Michigan State University
- Known for: Animal genetics
- Awards: Wolf Prize in Agriculture
- Scientific career
- Fields: Animal genetics

Neal Lloyd First (October 8, 1930 – November 20, 2014) was an American biologist.

== Birth and education ==
Neal L. First was born in 1930.

== Awards and honors ==
Neal L. First received several awards. He received the Animal Science Morrison Award, the Upjohn Research Award, the Society for the Study of Reproduction Research Award, the National Association of Animal Breeders Research Award and the Von Humboldt Award. In 1996/7, he received the Wolf Prize in Agriculture "for his pioneering research in the reproductive biology of livestock". He was at the faculty of the University of Wisconsin–Madison when he received the prize.

He was also a member of the National Academy of Sciences.

== Personal life ==
First died on November 20, 2014, from cancer, but surrounded by loving family.
