= Ernest Robert Sears =

American geneticist

- Born: October 15, 1910; Bethel, Polk County, Oregon
- Died: February 15, 1991 (aged 80); Missouri
- Occupations: Geneticist, botanist

Academic background
- Education: Oregon State University; Harvard University

Academic work
- Discipline: Plant genetics, wheat cytogenetics
- Institutions: USDA, University of Missouri

Ernest Robert Sears (October 15, 1910, Bethel, Polk County, Oregon – February 15, 1991) was an American geneticist, botanist, pioneer of plant genetics, and leading expert on wheat cytogenetics. Sears and Sir Ralph Riley (1924–1999) are perhaps the two most important founders of chromosome engineering in plant breeding.

== Biography ==
After graduating from high school in 1928, Sears graduated in 1932 with a B.S. in agriculture from Oregon State University. At Harvard University he graduated in genetics with an M.A. in 1932 and a Ph.D. in 1936. Upon graduation he became a geneticist with the United States Department of Agriculture (USDA) at the University of Missouri, where he worked on wheat cytogenics (as well as wheat evolution, phylogeny, and systematics) for the next 55 years until his death.

Sears was a pioneer of methods of transferring agriculturally desirable genes into cultivated wheat from its wild relatives. Notably, he did important work on wheat genes for resistance to powdery mildew, common bunt, wheat leaf rust, and stem rust. The methods pioneered by Sears are also important for introducing genes for plant resistance against insects.

Sears recognized the importance of nullisomics in wheat. He was the author or coauthor of more than 100 articles in refereed journals, as well as 6 book chapters.

Sears retired from the USDA in 1980 but continued to work in the University of Missouri's greenhouses and in his campus office until his death in 1991. He credited part of his success to working with Lewis Stadler and Barbara McClintock. For 40 years Sears collaborated in research with his second wife.

In 1981, Sears became a founding member of the World Cultural Council.

He married in 1936 Caroline Fredericka Eichorn (1912–2001). His first marriage produced one son. After divorcing his first wife, he married in 1950 Liese Maria ("Lotti" or "Lottie") Steinitz (1916–1995). His second marriage produced one son and two daughters. In May 2001 the University of Missouri opened the Ernest R. and Lotti M. S. Sears Plant Growth Facility.

== Awards and honors ==
- 1951 — Stevenson Award of the American Society of Agronomy
- 1953 — Fellow of the American Association for the Advancement of Science
- 1958 — Hoblitzelle Award for Research in Agricultural Sciences
- 1964 — Member of the National Academy of Sciences
- 1970 — Honorary D.Sc. from the University of Göttingen
- 1978–1979 — President of the Genetics Society of America
- 1986 — Wolf Prize in Agriculture (shared with Ralph Riley for research done independently)
- 1991 — Carl Sprengel Agronomic Research Award of the American Society of Agronomy

== Selected publications ==
- —— (1937). "Cytological phenomena connected with self-sterility in flowering plants". Genetics. 22 (1): 130–181. doi:10.1093/genetics/22.1.130. PMC 1208741. PMID 17246827.
- —— (1939). "Cytogenetic studies with polyploid species of wheat. I. Chromosomal aberrations in the progeny of a haploid of Triticum vulgare". Genetics. 24 (4): 509–523. doi:10.1093/genetics/24.4.509. PMC 1209050. PMID 17246935.
- —— (1944). "Cytogenetic studies with polyploid species of wheat. II. Additional chromosomal aberrations in Triticum vulgare". Genetics. 29 (3): 232–246. doi:10.1093/genetics/29.3.232. PMC 1209244. PMID 17247118.
- McFadden, E. S.; —— (1946). "The Origin of Triticum spelta and Its Free-Threshing Hexaploid Relatives". Journal of Heredity. 37 (3): 81–89, 107–116. doi:10.1093/oxfordjournals.jhered.a105590. PMID 20985728.
- ——; Rodenhiser, H. A. (1948). "Nullisomic analysis of stem-rust resistance in Triticum vulgare var. Timstein". Genetics. 33 (1): 123–124. PMID 18933701.
- —— (1953). "Addition of the genome of Haynaldia villosa to Triticum aestivum". American Journal of Botany. 40 (3): 168–174. doi:10.2307/2438774. JSTOR 2438774.
- —— (1953). "Nullisomic analysis in common wheat". American Naturalist. 87 (835): 245–252. Bibcode:1953ANat...87..245S. doi:10.1086/281780. S2CID 84944293.
- Sears, E. R. (1954). "The aneuploids of common wheat". Mo. Agric. Exp. STN. Res. Bull. 572.
- Sears, E. R. (1956). "The transfer of leaf-rust resistance from Aegilops umbellulata to wheat". Brookhaven Symp. Biol. 9: 1–22.
- ——; Loegering, W. Q.; Rodenhiser, H. A. (1957). "Identification of chromosomes carrying genes for stem rust resistance in four varieties of wheat". Agronomy Journal. 49 (4): 208–212. Bibcode:1957AgrJ...49..208S. doi:10.2134/agronj1957.00021962004900040012x.
- ——; Okato, M. (1958). "Intergenomic chromosome relationships in hexaploid wheat". Proceedings of the Tenth International Congress on Genetics. Vol. 2. pp. 258–259.
- —— (1962). "The use of telocentric chromosomes in linkage mapping". Genetics. 47: 983.
- Shama Rao, H. K.; —— (1964). "Chemical mutagenesis in Triticum aestivum". Mutation Research/Fundamental and Molecular Mechanisms of Mutagenesis. 1 (4): 387–399. Bibcode:1964MRFMM...1..387S. doi:10.1016/0027-5107(64)90032-6.
- Feldman, M.; Mello-Sampayo, T.; —— (1966). "Somatic association in Triticum aestivum". Proceedings of the National Academy of Sciences. 56 (4): 1192–1199. Bibcode:1966PNAS...56.1192F. doi:10.1073/pnas.56.4.1192. PMC 220038. PMID 5230145.
- —— (1966). "Chromosome mapping with the aid of telocentrics". Proceedings of the 2nd International Wheat Genetics Symposium. Hereditas Supplement. Vol. 2. pp. 370–381.
- —— (1966). "Nullisomic-Tetrasomic Combinations in Hexaploid Wheat". In R. Riley; K. R. Lewis (eds.). Chromosome Manipulations and Plant Genetics. London: Oliver and Boyd. pp. 29–45. doi:10.1007/978-1-4899-6561-5_4. ISBN 978-1-4899-6259-1.
- Rosalind, Morris; —— (1967). "The cytogenetics of wheat and its relatives". In K. S. Quisenberry; L. P. Reitz (eds.). Wheat and Wheat Improvement. Madison, Wisconsin: American Society of Agronomy. pp. 19–87.
- ——; Loegering, W. Q. (1968). "Mapping of stem-rust genes Sr9 and Sr16 of wheat". Crop Science. 8 (3): 371–373. doi:10.2135/cropsci1968.0011183X000800030032x.
- —— (1973). "Agropyron—wheat transfers induced by homologous pairing". Proceedings of the Fourth International Wheat Genetics Symposium. pp. 191–99. (See Agropyron.)
- —— (1975). "An induced homoeologous—pairing mutant in Triticum aestivum". Genetics. 80: 74.
- —— (1976). "Genetic control of chromosome pairing in wheat". Annual Review of Genetics. 10: 31–51. doi:10.1146/annurev.ge.10.120176.000335. PMID 797311.
- —— (1977). "Genetics Society of Canada Award of Excellence Lecture: An Induced Mutant with Homoeologous Pairing in Common Wheat". Canadian Journal of Genetics and Cytology. 19 (4): 585–593. doi:10.1139/g77-063.
- ——; Sears, L. M. S. (1978). "The telocentric chromosomes of common wheat". Proceedings of the Fifth International Wheat Genetics Symposium. Vol. 1. pp. 389–407.
- ——; Sears, L. M. S. (1978). "The telocentric chromosomes of common wheat". In S. Ramanujams (ed.). Proceedings of the 5th International Wheat Genetics Symposium. New Delhi: Indian Agricultural Research Institute. pp. 389–407.
- Loegering, W. Q.; —— (1981). "Genetic control of disease expression in stem rust of wheat". Phytopathology. 71 (4): 425–428. doi:10.1094/Phyto-71-425.
- —— (1982). "A Wheat Mutation Conditioning an Intermediate Level of Homoeologous Chromosome Pairing". Canadian Journal of Genetics and Cytology. 24 (6): 715–719. doi:10.1139/g82-076.
- —— (1985). "The transfer of short segments of alien chromosome to wheat". In R. B. Singh; R. M. Singh; B. D. Singh (eds.). Advances in Cytogenetics and Crop Improvement. Ludhiana: Kalyani Publishers. pp. 75–79.
- ——; Miller, T. E. (1985). "The history of Chinese spring wheat". Cereal Research Communications. 13 (2/3): 261–263. JSTOR 23783009.
- ——; Gustafson, J. P. (1993). "Use of radiation to transfer alien chromosome segments to wheat". Crop Science. 33 (5): 897–901. doi:10.2135/cropsci1993.0011183X003300050004x.
