= Linda Saif =

American microbial scientist

- Spouse: Mo Saif
- Awards: Wolf Prize in Agriculture

Academic background
- Education: College of Wooster (B.A. 1969); Ohio State University (M.S. 1971, Ph.D. 1976)
- Influences: Dr. Edward Bohl

Academic work
- Institutions: Ohio State University
- Main interests: biologist
- Notable ideas: virology, immunology

Linda J. Saif is an American microbial scientist who works at Ohio State University. In 2015, she became the first female recipient of the Wolf Prize in Agriculture for her research in virology and immunology.

Saif is a Fulbright scholar and a member of the National Academy of Sciences. In 2017 Saif was inducted into the National Academy of Inventors (NAI). In 2003, she studied the SARS coronavirus outbreak with the World Health Organization.

Saif is married to immunologist Dr. Mo Saif, Professor Emeritus, Department of Veterinary Preventive Medicine and Emeritus Program Head of the Food Animal Health Research Program, Ohio Agricultural Research and Development Center, The Ohio State University.

== Early life and education ==
Saif grew up in Ohio and was exposed to agriculture from an early age from time spent at her grandparents' farm. Saif attended private liberal arts college the College of Wooster in 1965 and graduated with a Honors in Biology in 1969. She briefly attended Case Western Reserve University, before attending Ohio State University in 1970 to complete a Master of Science in Microbiology and Immunology. She then undertook a PhD at Ohio State University and completed in 1976.
