= Shang Fa Yang =

Taiwanese-American plant scientist (1932–2007)

- 楊祥發
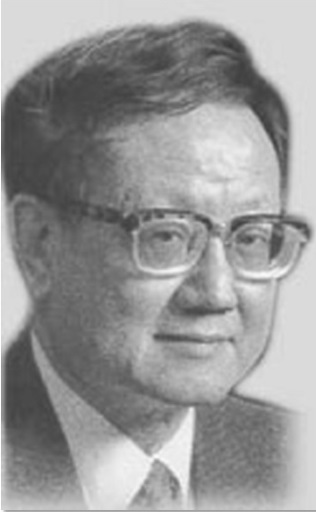
- Born: November 10, 1932; Tainan Prefecture, Taiwan
- Died: February 12, 2007 (aged 74); Davis, California, U.S.
- Education: National Taiwan University (BS, MS); Utah State University (PhD)
- Awards: Wolf Prize in Agriculture (1991)
- Scientific career
- Fields: Agricultural chemistry
- Institutions: University of California, Davis
- Thesis: Biochemical studies on the effect of fluoride on higher plants (1962)
- Doctoral advisor: Gene Walker Miller

Shang Fa Yang (Chinese: 楊祥發; pinyin: Yáng Xiángfā; November 10, 1932 – February 12, 2007) was a Taiwanese-American biochemist and botanist specializing in agricultural chemistry. He was a professor at the University of California, Davis. He was awarded the 1991 Wolf Prize in Agriculture and was elected a member of the US National Academy of Sciences the year before.

== Early life and education ==
Yang was born in 1932 in Taiwan, the youngest of twelve children of Chian-Zuai Yang, a sugarcane producer turned miller. Shang Fa Yang never learned his exact date of birth, but surmised it fell between late October and early November, and chose to celebrate his birthday on November 10. He earned his bachelor's and master's degrees in agricultural chemistry from National Taiwan University in 1956 and 1958, respectively. He subsequently moved to the United States and completed his doctoral degree in plant biochemistry from Utah State University in 1962.

== Career ==
After completing his PhD, he conducted postdoctoral research at the University of California, Davis, New York Medical School, and University of California, San Diego. He joined the University of California, Davis faculty in 1966.

The Yang cycle

Yang was known for his research that unlocked the key to prolonging freshness in fruits and flowers. His research focused on how plants produce ethylene, which is important in regulating a host of plant functions, ranging from seed germination to fruit ripening. He studied the pathway of ethylene biosynthesis and proved unequivocally the central role of methionine as a precursor of ethylene. He discovers that this process is cyclic and therefore receives the name "Yang Cycle". Ethylene represents one of the five major hormones affecting plant development and maturation.

He was the first scientist to report S-adenosylmethionine as an intermediate in methionine conversion to ethylene. Then, in 1979, he discovered aminocyclopropane-1-carboxylic acid (ACC) as an intermediate. His discovery of ACC-synthase opened the way to the understanding of the regulating process of ethylene biosynthesis.

Yang retired from University of California, Davis in 1994, and conducted research with Academia Sinica until 1999. He was vice president of Academia Sinica from 1996 to 1999.

Yang died on February 12, 2007, in a Davis hospital from complications of pneumonia. After his death, Academia Sinica began hosting the Shang-Fa Yang Memorial Lecture.

== Awards and honours ==
Yang received several awards and honours for his research. In 1990, he was inducted into the U.S. National Academy of Sciences. In 1991, he was awarded the Wolf Prize in Agriculture "for his remarkable contributions to the understanding of the mechanism of biosynthesis, mode of action and applications of the plant hormone, Ethylene." Yang was the first Taiwanese researcher to win a Wolf Prize. In 1992, he was awarded the American Society of Horticultural Science Outstanding Research Award, and elected a member of Taiwan's Academia Sinica. Yang has been recognized as a Pioneer Member of the American Society of Plant Biologists.
