= Leif Andersson (animal geneticist) =

Swedish geneticist

- Born: 17 September 1954 (age 72); Stockholm, Sweden
- Awards: Wolf Prize in Agriculture (2014); Björkénska priset (2017)

Academic background
- Education: University of Stockholm, Uppsala University

Academic work
- Institutions: Department of Medical Biochemistry and Microbiology, Uppsala University
- Main interests: Biologist
- Notable ideas: Animal Genetics

Leif Andersson (born 1954) is a Swedish animal geneticist and professor of functional genomics at Uppsala University. In 2014, he won the Wolf Prize in Agriculture alongside Jorge Dubcovsky. He was inducted into the Royal Swedish Academy of Sciences in 2002 and is a foreign member of the National Academy of Sciences. He was elected to the American Philosophical Society in 2017.

== Career ==
Andersson grew up in Stockholm. After completing his undergraduate degree, he worked at the Swedish University of Agricultural Sciences. He completed his Ph.D. at Uppsala University. In 2012, Andersson and a team of researchers mapped the pig genome. Andersson has also researched animal domestication, the domestic chicken genome, and the genetics of the white horse.
