= Bethel, Polk County, Oregon =

Unincorporated community in the state of Oregon, United States

Coordinates: 45°02′25″N 123°11′05″W

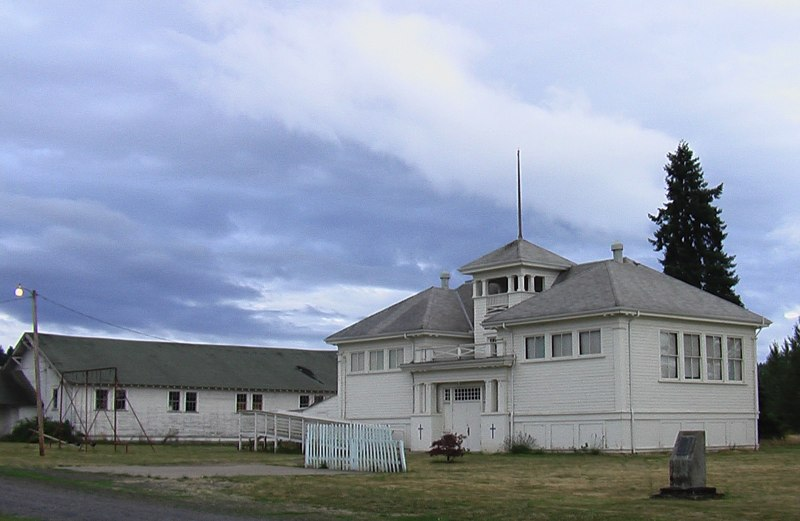
Bethel Church, formerly Bethel School, with auditorium in background

Bethel is an unincorporated community in Polk County, Oregon, United States. It sits at the base of the Eola Hills in Plum Valley. Bethel is considered a ghost town as the only remaining structure is a school, now serving as a church. The locale was named by the Rev. Glen O. Burnett for a Church of Christ in Missouri where he had served as pastor. Bethel is a common name for churches as it is a Hebrew word that means "house of god". After traveling with his family on the Oregon Trail, Burnett settled on a Donation Land Claim in 1846. Burnett later rode circuit to the surrounding area, preaching in nearby communities, including Rickreall.

== History ==
Another settler, Dr. Nathaniel Hudson, came to the area in 1851 and founded a school, Bethel Academy, in 1852. Dr. Hudson moved to a new land claim in the Dallas area in 1854 and the academy closed. In 1855 a new school named Bethel Institute was organized, and in 1856, the Oregon Territorial Legislature officially chartered the institute as one of the earliest colleges in the state, which was later renamed Bethel College. Pioneer Jesse Applegate, who was a friend of Burnett's from Missouri and who traveled in the same wagon train, was on the college's board of trustees. Bethel College had financial problems and in 1861 it merged with another Disciples of Christ institution: Monmouth College. Following a series of further mergers and name changes, Monmouth College became known as Western Oregon University. The college building in Bethel was eventually dismantled.

The first store in Bethel was built in 1855, and the post office followed in 1865. At one time the town had a blacksmith shop, carpentry shop, and a wagon shop. Bethel post office ran from 1865 to 1880. The town was located on the wagon road that went between Amity and Monmouth, but when a new narrow-gauge railway line was built in the area, through Amity, Dallas and Independence, it bypassed Bethel and instead was routed through McCoy, a decision which contributed to Bethel's decline.

In October 2013, the school's former auditorium, renovated two months earlier to become the Eola Hills Charter School within the Amity School District, burned down. The church building was not damaged.

== Agriculture and viticulture ==
Today, the area is part of the Eola-Amity Hills AVA with many wineries and vineyards, including Bethel Heights Vineyard which was named after the area.

== Notable people ==
- Ernest Robert Sears (1910–1991), American plant geneticist, was born in Bethel

== Gallery ==
The Plum Valley area around Bethel.

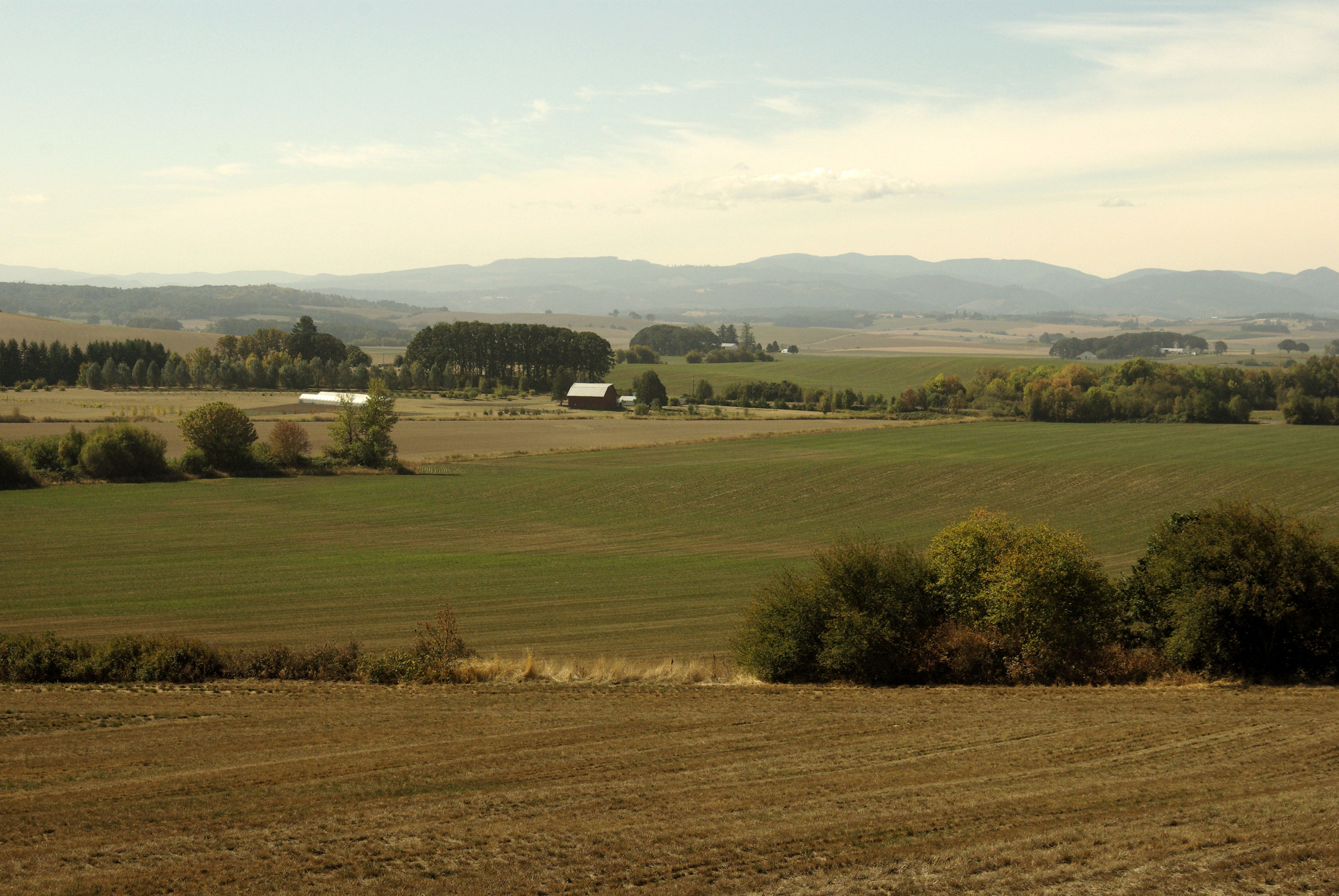

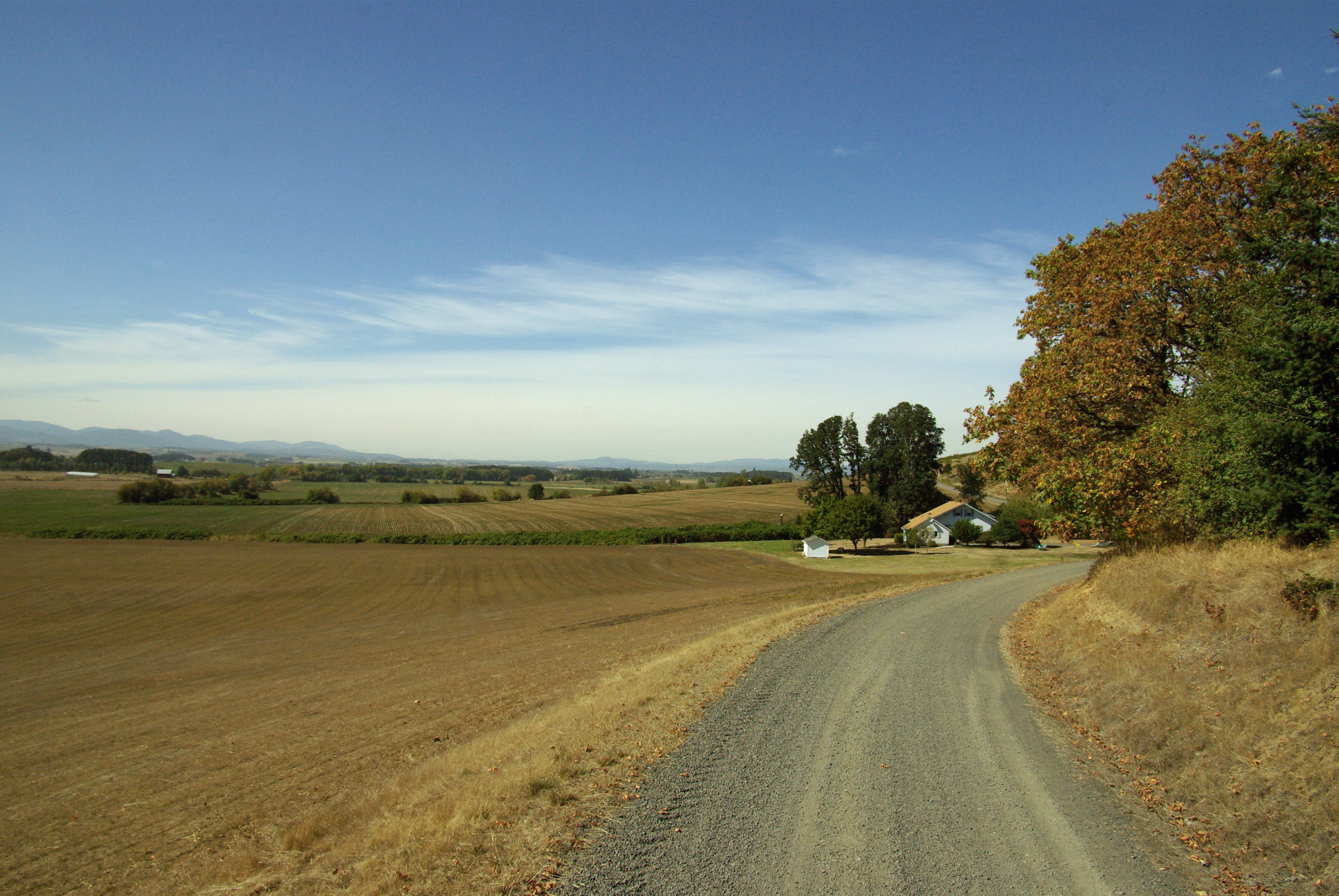
