= John E. Casida =

American entomologist (1929–2018)

Here John E. Casida performs in Sonya Rapoport’s interactive installation "Biorhythm: How Do You Feel?" at WORKS gallery in San Jose, California (1983).

John Edward Casida (December 22, 1929 – June 30, 2018) was an American entomologist, toxicologist and professor at the University of California, Berkeley.

== Birth and education ==
Casida was born in 1929 in the United States. He completed his BS from the University of Wisconsin–Madison in 1951. He completed his MS in 1951 and PhD in 1954 from the same university.

== Research ==
Casida is known for his research on the toxicology and mode of action of most major insecticides, herbicides and fungicides, and their synergists. This research included the discovery that ryanoid and cyclodiene insecticides disrupt the calcium and GABA channels, which has opened up research directed towards identifying new compounds that interact with GABA receptors. Additional areas of study include research on the synthesis, metabolism, toxicokinetics and mechanisms of toxicity of the organophosphates, pyrethroids and neonicotinoids. In addition, he is described as being a "Highly Cited" researcher by ISI Web of Knowledge, and currently has in excess of 850 scientific publications.

He synthesized compounds more active and less persistent than insecticides then used in agricultural practice and his contributions have provided a rational basis for the evaluation of the risks and benefits of pesticides and toxicants.

He was elected to the United States National Academy of Sciences in 1991 and to the Royal Society (UK) in 1998. In 1993, he was awarded the Wolf Prize in Agriculture "for his pioneering studies on the mode of action of insecticides, design of safer pesticides and contributions to the understanding of nerve and muscle function in insects". Additional honors include receiving the Founders Award from the Society of Environmental Toxicology and Chemistry (1994) and the Koro-Sho Prize from the Pesticide Science Society of Japan (1995). He was the William Muriece Hoskins Chair in Chemical and Molecular Entomology at the University of California, Berkeley.
