= Selcuk Adabag =

American academic

Ahmet Selcuk Adabag is a Professor of Medicine at the University of Minnesota.

== Education ==
Adabag obtained his M.D. degree following the completion of medical school and a residency in cardiology and internal medicine at Hacettepe University Medical School in Ankara, Turkey. He then immigrated to New York, United States, where he continued his residency in internal medicine at University at Buffalo and following it moved to Minnesota where he completed fellowships in cardiovascular disease and cardiac electrophysiology at the University of Minnesota.

== Career ==
After completing his fellowships, Adabag became an assistant professor of medicine at the University of Minnesota and research investigator with the Hypertrophic Cardiomyopathy Center at the Minneapolis Heart Institute. He was later promoted to the associate investigator and was transferred to the Center for Chronic Disease Outcomes Research and following it became staff cardiologist and the co-director of the Medical Intensive Care and Cardiac Step-down Units at the Veterans Affairs Medical Center in Minneapolis.

== Fellowships ==
- Fellow of the American Heart Association's Council on Cardiopulmonary, Critical Care, Perioperative and Resuscitation (2018)

== See also ==
- Robert Vince (scientist)
- Ronald L. Phillips
