= IRF9 =

Protein-coding gene in the species Homo sapiens

Identifiers
- Aliases: IRF9, IRF-9, ISGF3, ISGF3G, p48, interferon regulatory factor 9
- External IDs: OMIM: 147574; MGI: 107587; GeneCards: IRF9

Gene location (Human)
Chr.	Chromosome 14 (human)
Band	14q12	Start	24,161,265 bp
Band	14q12	End	24,166,565 bp

Gene location (Mouse)
Chr.	Chromosome 14 (mouse)
Band	14 C3|14 28.19 cM	Start	55,841,028 bp
Band	14 C3|14 28.19 cM	End	55,847,487 bp
RNA expression pattern
Bgee	Human / Mouse (ortholog); Top expressed in: spleen; granulocyte; appendix; lymph node; blood; gallbladder; right uterine tube; anterior pituitary; bone marrow; bone marrow cell / Top expressed in: granulocyte; Ileal epithelium; spleen; lymph node; seminal vesicula; mesenteric lymph nodes; thymus; blood; left lung lobe; parotid gland; More reference expression data
BioGPS	n/a
Gene ontology
Molecular function	DNA-binding transcription factor activity; DNA binding; protein binding; DNA-binding transcription factor activity, RNA polymerase II-specific; RNA polymerase II cis-regulatory region sequence-specific DNA binding
Cellular component	nucleus; nucleoplasm; cytoplasm; cytosol
Biological process	cell surface receptor signaling pathway; regulation of transcription, DNA-templated; transcription by RNA polymerase II; defense response to virus; type I interferon signaling pathway; transcription, DNA-templated; interferon-gamma-mediated signaling pathway; regulation of transcription by RNA polymerase II; immune system process
Sources:Amigo / QuickGO
Orthologs
Databases	NCBI: entry; OMA: entry
Species	Human	Mouse
Entrez	10379	16391
Ensembl	ENSG00000213928; ENSG00000285048	ENSMUSG00000002325
UniProt	Q00978	Q61179
RefSeq (mRNA)	NM_006084; NM_001385400; NM_001385401; NM_001385402	NM_001159417; NM_001159418; NM_008394
RefSeq (protein)	NP_006075	NP_001152889; NP_001152890; NP_032420
Location (UCSC)	Chr 14: 24.16 – 24.17 Mb	Chr 14: 55.84 – 55.85 Mb
PubMed search
- Wikidata
View/Edit Human	View/Edit Mouse

Interferon regulatory factor 9 is a protein that in humans is encoded by the IRF9 gene, previously known as ISGF3G.

== Interactions ==
IRF9 has been shown to interact with STAT2 and STAT1.
