= Glenn W. Salisbury =

American reproductive biologist

Glenn Wade Salisbury
- Born: June 2, 1910; Ashtabula County, Ohio, U.S.
- Died: February 3, 1994
- Education: Cornell University
- Spouse: Dorothy Cross Salisbury
- Scientific career
- Fields: reproductive biology

Glenn Wade Salisbury (1910–1994) was an American agriculture reproductive biologist who was a leading figure in promoting the use of artificial insemination in dairy cows to maximize the use of superior paternal genes.

== Honor ==
- National Academy of Sciences member (1974)
- Wolf Prize in Agriculture (1981)
