= IFNAR2 =

Protein-coding gene in the species Homo sapiens

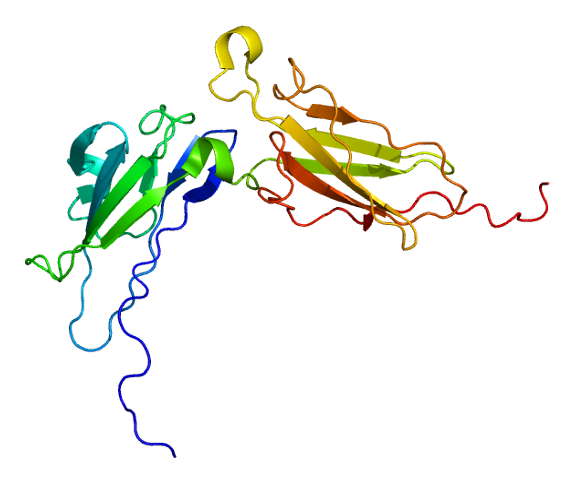

Identifiers
- Aliases: IFNAR2, IFN-R, IFN-alpha-REC, IFNABR, IFNARB, IMD45, interferon alpha and beta receptor subunit 2
- External IDs: OMIM: 602376; MGI: 1098243; GeneCards: IFNAR2
Available structures
PDB	Ortholog search: PDBe RCSB
PDB	List of PDB id codes 1N6U, 1N6V, 2HYM, 2KZ1, 2LAG, 3S8W, 3S9D, 3SE3, 3SE4

Gene location (Human)
Chr.	Chromosome 21 (human)
Band	21q22.11	Start	33,205,282 bp
Band	21q22.11	End	33,265,675 bp

Gene location (Mouse)
Chr.	Chromosome 16 (mouse)
Band	16 C3.3|16 52.82 cM	Start	91,169,671 bp
Band	16 C3.3|16 52.82 cM	End	91,202,477 bp
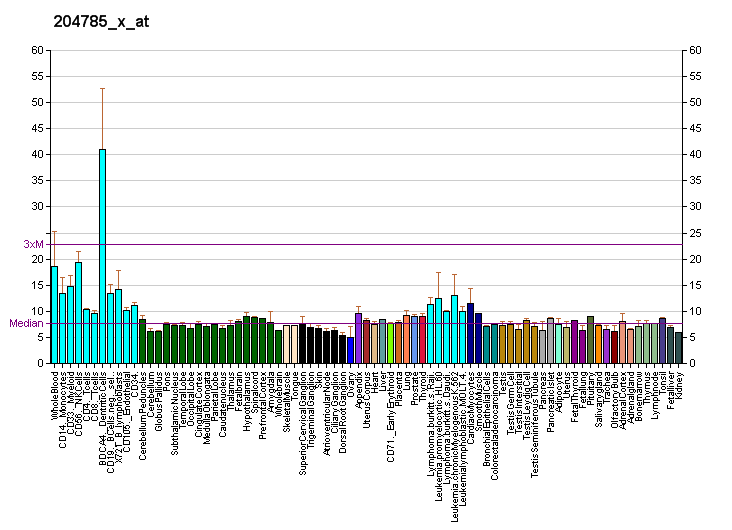

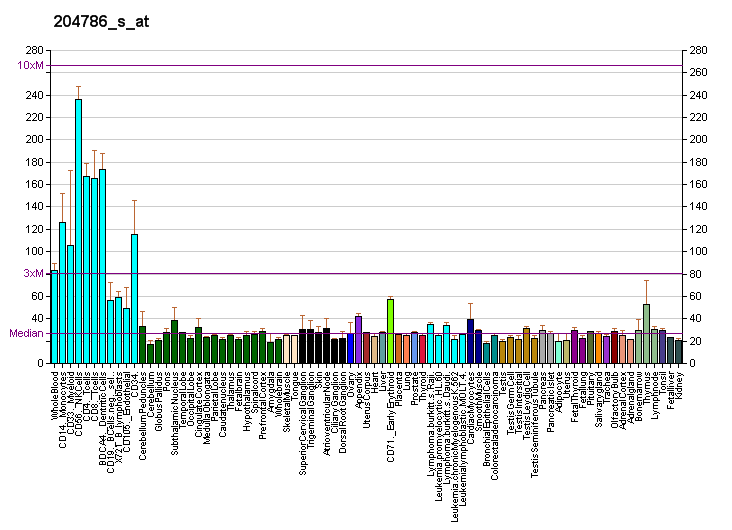
RNA expression pattern
Bgee	Human / Mouse (ortholog); Top expressed in: blood; monocyte; oocyte; granulocyte; trabecular bone; pylorus; cartilage tissue; lymph node; islet of Langerhans; spleen / Top expressed in: granulocyte; right lobe of liver; right kidney; tail of embryo; genital tubercle; spleen; thymus; mesenteric lymph nodes; internal carotid artery; bone marrow; More reference expression data
BioGPS	More reference expression data
Gene ontology
Molecular function	protein binding; type I interferon binding; protein kinase binding; type I interferon receptor activity; cytokine receptor activity
Cellular component	integral component of membrane; extracellular region; plasma membrane; integral component of plasma membrane; membrane; intracellular anatomical structure; extracellular space
Biological process	cell surface receptor signaling pathway; response to virus; receptor signaling pathway via JAK-STAT; regulation of type I interferon-mediated signaling pathway; type I interferon signaling pathway; response to interferon-alpha; response to interferon-beta; defense response to virus; cytokine-mediated signaling pathway
Sources:Amigo / QuickGO
Orthologs
Databases	NCBI: entry; OMA: entry
Species	Human	Mouse
Entrez	3455	15976
Ensembl	ENSG00000159110	ENSMUSG00000022971
UniProt	P48551	O35664
RefSeq (mRNA)	NM_207585; NM_000874; NM_001289125; NM_001289126; NM_001289128 NM_207584; NM_001385054; NM_001385055	NM_001110498; NM_010509; NM_001347258
RefSeq (protein)	NP_000865; NP_001276054; NP_001276055; NP_001276057; NP_997467 NP_997468	NP_001103968; NP_001334187; NP_034639
Location (UCSC)	Chr 21: 33.21 – 33.27 Mb	Chr 16: 91.17 – 91.2 Mb
PubMed search
- Wikidata
View/Edit Human	View/Edit Mouse

Interferon-alpha/beta receptor beta chain is a protein that in humans is encoded by the IFNAR2 gene.

== Function ==
The protein encoded by this gene is a type I membrane protein that forms one of the two chains of a receptor for interferons alpha and beta. Binding and activation of the receptor stimulates Janus protein kinases, which in turn phosphorylate several proteins, including STAT1 and STAT2. Multiple transcript variants encoding at least two different isoforms have been found for this gene.

== Interactions ==
IFNAR2 has been shown to interact with:

- GNB2L1,
- IFNA2,
- STAT1, and
- STAT2.
