= Harris Lewin =

American biologist (born 1957)

- Born: 1957; Brooklyn, N.Y.
- Awards: Wolf Prize in Agriculture

Academic background
- Education: Cornell University; University of California, Davis
- Thesis: (1984)

Academic work
- Institutions: University of Illinois; University of California, Davis
- Main interests: biologist
- Notable ideas: genomics and immunogenetics

Harris A. Lewin, an American biologist, is a professor of evolution and ecology and Robert and Rosabel Osborne Endowed Chair at the University of California, Davis. He is a member of the National Academy of Sciences. In 2011, Lewin won the Wolf Prize in Agriculture for his research into cattle genomics. Lewin chairs the working group for the Earth BioGenome Project, a moonshot for biology that aims to sequence, catalog, and characterize the genomes of all of Earth’s eukaryotic biodiversity over a period of 10 years. Lewin is a founding co-editor of the Annual Review of Animal Biosciences, first published in 2013.

== Career ==
Lewin studied at Cornell University and earned his B.S. in Animal Science in 1979 and M.S. in Animal Breeding and Genetics in 1981. He was awarded his Ph.D. in Immunology from the University of California, Davis in 1984. He then worked at the University of Illinois. In 2003, he served as the founding director of the Carl R. Woese Institute for Genomic Biology. In 2009, he and a team of researchers fully sequenced the cow genome.

Lewin served as vice chancellor for research at University of California, Davis from 2011 until 2016. In 2016 he returned to the faculty in the University of California, Davis Department of Evolution and Ecology and the Genome Center. Lewin is a member of a group biologists that propose to sequence the DNA of all life on Earth.

Lewin was senior author of a study that revealed one of the most prolific bulls in the history of Holstein cattle breeding, Pawnee Farm Arlinda Chief, had a lethal gene mutation estimated to have caused half million spontaneous cow abortions worldwide. Lewin collaborated with researchers from the Institut National de la Recherche Agronomique in France for a study that used RNA-sequencing to highlight problems with gene expression in cloned cattle. In a study published in the Proceedings of the National Academy of Sciences, Lewin and his colleagues used an algorithm to computationally recreate the chromosomes of the first eutherian mammal, the long-extinct, shrewlike ancestor of all placental mammals.

At the 48th World Economic Forum Annual Meeting in Davos-Klosters, Switzerland, Lewin announced a landmark partnership between the Earth BioGenome Project and the Earth Bank of Codes to map the DNA of all the planet’s eukaryotes, some 1.5 million known species. Lewin was the lead author for a perspective paper published April 23, 2018 in the Proceedings of the National Academy of Sciences, "Earth BioGenome Project: Sequencing life for the future of life." In the paper, the 24 interdisciplinary experts who comprise the Earth BioGenome Project Working Group, outline a roadmap and rational for the project, which is estimated to cost $4.7 billion and take ten years.
