= IFNAR1 =

Protein-coding gene in the species Homo sapiens

Identifiers
- Aliases: IFNAR1, AVP, IFN-alpha-REC, IFNAR, IFNBR, IFRC, interferon alpha and beta receptor subunit 1
- External IDs: OMIM: 107450; MGI: 107658; GeneCards: IFNAR1
Available structures
PDB	Ortholog search: PDBe RCSB
PDB	List of PDB id codes 3S98, 3SE3, 3SE4, 4PO6

Gene location (Human)
Chr.	Chromosome 21 (human)
Band	21q22.11	Start	33,324,429 bp
Band	21q22.11	End	33,359,864 bp

Gene location (Mouse)
Chr.	Chromosome 16 (mouse)
Band	16 C3.3|16 52.98 cM	Start	91,282,126 bp
Band	16 C3.3|16 52.98 cM	End	91,304,329 bp
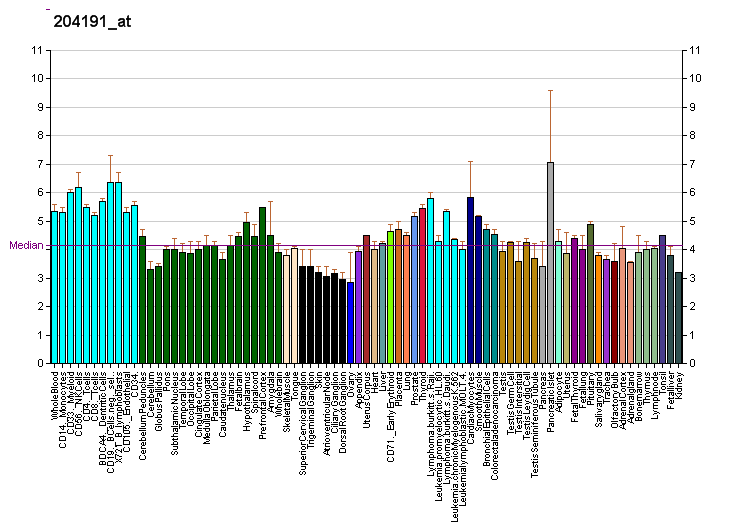
RNA expression pattern
Bgee	Human / Mouse (ortholog); Top expressed in: monocyte; rectum; gallbladder; ventricular zone; islet of Langerhans; endothelial cell; Achilles tendon; blood; epithelium of colon; stromal cell of endometrium / Top expressed in: genital tubercle; tail of embryo; granulocyte; Rostral migratory stream; vas deferens; aortic valve; stroma of bone marrow; cumulus cell; thymus; ventricular zone; More reference expression data
BioGPS	More reference expression data
Gene ontology
Molecular function	interferon receptor activity; protein binding; interleukin-10 receptor activity; type I interferon receptor activity; type I interferon binding; cytokine receptor activity
Cellular component	integral component of membrane; endosome; late endosome; membrane; plasma membrane; lysosome; integral component of plasma membrane
Biological process	receptor signaling pathway via JAK-STAT; response to virus; cytokine-mediated signaling pathway; response to lipopolysaccharide; cellular response to interferon-alpha; type I interferon signaling pathway
Sources:Amigo / QuickGO
Orthologs
Databases	NCBI: entry; OMA: entry
Species	Human	Mouse
Entrez	3454	15975
Ensembl	ENSG00000142166	ENSMUSG00000022967
UniProt	P17181	P33896
RefSeq (mRNA)	NM_000629	NM_010508
RefSeq (protein)	NP_000620	NP_034638
Location (UCSC)	Chr 21: 33.32 – 33.36 Mb	Chr 16: 91.28 – 91.3 Mb
PubMed search
- Wikidata
View/Edit Human	View/Edit Mouse

Interferon-alpha/beta receptor alpha chain is a protein that in humans is encoded by the IFNAR1 gene.

== Function ==
The protein encoded by this gene is a type I membrane protein that forms one of the two chains of a receptor for type I interferons, including interferon-alpha, -beta, and -lambda. Binding and activation of the receptor stimulates Janus protein kinases, which in turn phosphorylate several proteins, including STAT1 and STAT2. The encoded protein also functions as an antiviral factor.

== Interactions ==
IFNAR1 has been shown to interact with:

- PRMT1,
- STAT2, and
- Tyrosine kinase 2.
