= National Research Initiative Competitive Grants Program =

Inactive competitive grant program

The National Research Initiative Competitive Grants Program, often referred to as the National Research Initiative (NRI) was a United States Department of Agriculture (USDA) competitive grant program.

Grants were made to scientists at both public and private laboratories for basic and applied agricultural research in priority areas as designated in the research title of the 1990 farm bill (P.L. 101-624, Title XVI), as amended. Grants were awarded competitively through a peer review process.

The NRI was not reauthorized in the 2008 farm bill.
