= Corpus albicans =

Structure derived from the corpus luteum

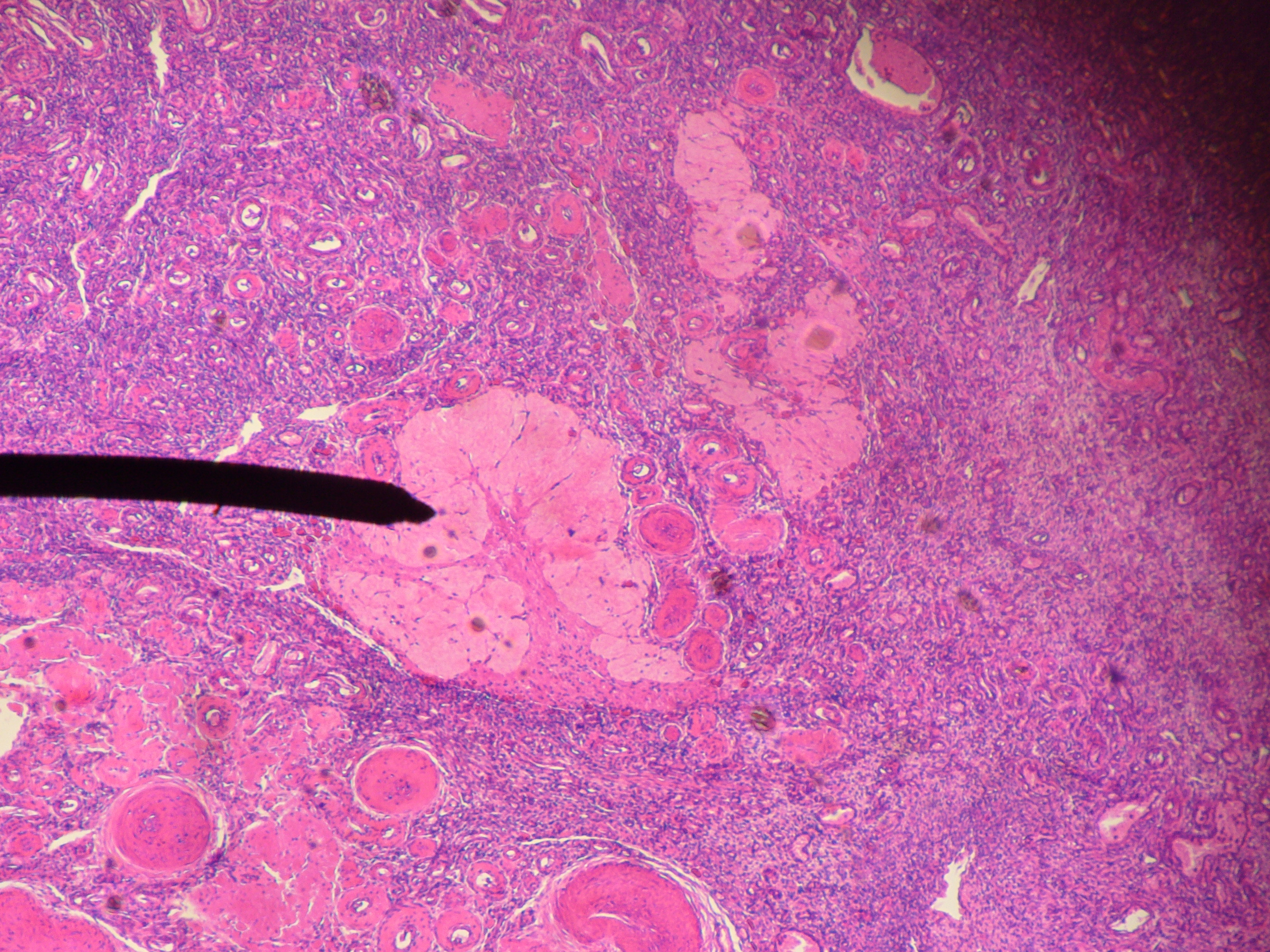
- Human corpus albicans

Details

Identifiers
- Latin: corpus albicans
- TA98: A09.1.01.016
- TA2: 3485
- FMA: 18620

The corpus albicans (Latin for "whitening body"; also known as atretic corpus luteum, corpus candicans, or simply as albicans) is the regressed form of the corpus luteum. As the corpus luteum is being broken down by macrophages, fibroblasts lay down type I collagen, forming the corpus albicans. This process is called "luteolysis". The remains of the corpus albicans may persist as a scar on the surface of the ovary.

== Background ==
During the first few hours after expulsion of the ovum from the follicle, the remaining granulosa and theca interna cells change rapidly into lutein cells. They enlarge in diameter two or more times and become filled with lipid inclusions that give them a yellowish appearance.

This process is called luteinization, and the total mass of cells together is called the corpus luteum. A well-developed vascular supply also grows into the corpus luteum.

The granulosa cells in the corpus luteum develop extensive intracellular smooth endoplasmic reticula that form large amounts of the female sex hormones progesterone and estrogen (more progesterone than estrogen during the luteal phase). The theca cells form mainly the androgens androstenedione and testosterone. These hormones may then be converted by aromatase in the granulosa cells into estrogens, including estradiol.

The corpus luteum normally grows to about 1.5 centimeters in diameter, reaching this stage of development 7 to 8 days after ovulation. Then it begins to involute and eventually loses its secretory function and its yellowish, lipid characteristic about 12 days after ovulation, becoming the corpus albicans. In the ensuing weeks, this is replaced by connective tissue and over months is reabsorbed.
