= Luteolysis =

Luteolysis (also known as luteal regression) is the structural and functional degradation of the corpus luteum, which occurs at the end of the luteal phase of both the estrous and menstrual cycles in the absence of pregnancy.

== Prostaglandin F2 alpha (PGF2α) ==
Prostaglandin F2 alpha (PGF2α) has been identified as the key luteolytic hormone in many species. PGF2α is released from uterine endometrial cells in a pulsatile pattern when stimulated by oxytocin to stimulate both luteolytic activity and further release of oxytocin from the corpus luteum.

== Domestic animals ==
In domestic animals, luteolysis is initiated by the hormones prostaglandin F2alpha and oxytocin and is dependent on the presence of the uterus. In sheep, communication between the pars nervosa (posterior lobe of the pituitary gland), corpus luteum, and the uterus endometrium via the circulatory system is required for luteolysis. Studies with sheep have found that, if the uterine horn is ipsilateral to the ovary possessing the CL is surgically removed, the lifespan of the corpus luteum will increase drastically.

== Humans/Primates ==
Removal of the uterus in primates (including humans) does not prolong the life of the corpus luteum, indicating that a different stimulatory mechanism and source of PGF2α is responsible for luteolysis in these species. It has been proposed that PGF2α is made locally within the ovary and the corpus luteum may be the source of luteolytic PGF2α. Asthmatics should take great care when handling this hormone as PGF2α is bronchoconstrictor.

During a pregnancy, the corpus luteum remains on the ovary releasing progesterone which will maintain a state of uterine quiescence and close the cervix until the delivery of the fetus. Alternatively if no implantation of a blastocyst occurs, the corpus luteum is degraded to a corpus albicans (scar tissue) by PGF2α released by uterine endometrial cells.

Degradation of the corpus luteum will result in reduced levels of progesterone, promoting an increase in follicle-stimulating hormone (FSH) secretion by the adenohypophysis, which will trigger the development of a new follicle on the ovary.

In humans, the placental hormone human chorionic gonadotropin continues to maintain the corpus luteum. This is the hormone tested for by the pregnancy test.

== Equine ==
If pregnancy occurs in equine, the placental hormone equine chorionic gonadotropin released by endometrial cup acts like LH and FSH and stimulates additional ovulations, although the oocytes released during these ovulations are not fertilized. The resulting accessory corpora lutea produce progesterone and keep levels of progesterone high during pregnancy.

== Luteolytic agents ==
- Danazol was described as a luteolytic agent.
- Cloprostenol is another example of such an agent.
