= Frank Stephenson (footballer) =

Australian rules footballer

Personal information
- Full name: Frank Stephenson
- Born: 19 April 1934 (age 92)
- Original team: East Ballarat / Perth
- Height: 188 cm (6 ft 2 in)
- Weight: 86 kg (190 lb)

Playing career^{1}
Years	Club	Games (Goals)
1958–60	North Melbourne	30 (6)
- ^{1} Playing statistics correct to the end of 1960.

Frank Stephenson (born 19 April 1934) is a former Australian rules footballer who played with North Melbourne in the Victorian Football League (VFL).
