= Frank J. Stevenson =

Frank J. Stevenson (August 2, 1922 – May 29, 2015) was an American agricultural scientist who made large contributions to the scientific agricultural community breakthroughs regarding soil and its relationship with organic matter and humic substances (HS).

== Early life and career ==
Stevenson was born in Logan, Utah and received his primary education in Salt Lake City. He started his post secondary education at the University of Utah but joined the U.S World War II efforts, initially as a machinist and then as a Navy airman. before seeing live action in the Iowa Jima campaign he received his training at Pensacola, Florida. His plane was shot down during the Iowa Jima campaign. After the war he continued his education at Brigham Young University where he obtained his bachelor of science degree. He received his PhD in 1952 and accepted a position at the University of Illinois, initially as an instructor and then as a professor. He retired in 1990.

== Scientific work ==
Stevenson was involved with research using humic chemistry and concepts regarding how humic chemistry interacts with earth metals found within our soil. it is because of this work that he was recognized as one of the first scientists to discover and further map out organic materials within our soil which has been implemented and substantially benefited agricultural settings. It is with his work along with fellow scientist Morris Schnitzer that aided in the understanding of the impacts of chemicals and nutrients within the earth soil. With their work being fundamentally important with regards to understanding soil and environmental functions, Schnitzer and Stevenson were both awarded the Wolf Prize in Agriculture in 1995. He was also made an honorary member of the International Humic Substances Society (IHSS) along with Schnitzer as their work was seen to be groundbreaking to the research community.
