= STAT2 =

Protein-coding gene in Homo sapiens

Identifiers
- Aliases: STAT2, ISGF-3, P113, STAT113, IMD44, signal transducer and activator of transcription 2, PTORCH3
- External IDs: OMIM: 600556; MGI: 103039; GeneCards: STAT2
Available structures
PDB	Ortholog search: PDBe RCSB
PDB	List of PDB id codes 2KA4

Gene location (Human)
Chr.	Chromosome 12 (human)
Band	12q13.3	Start	56,341,597 bp
Band	12q13.3	End	56,360,167 bp

Gene location (Mouse)
Chr.	Chromosome 10 (mouse)
Band	10 D3|10 76.5 cM	Start	128,106,428 bp
Band	10 D3|10 76.5 cM	End	128,128,718 bp
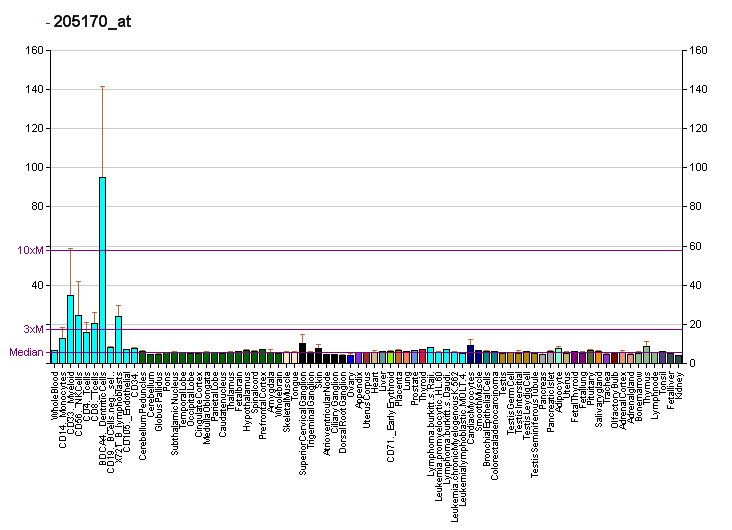

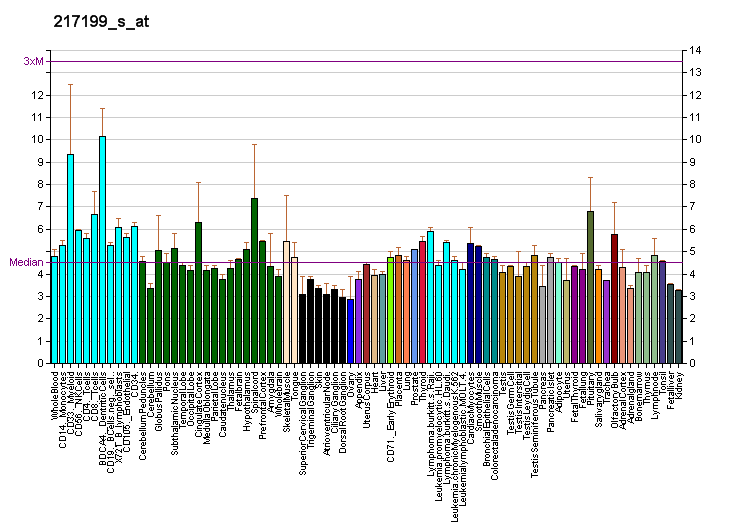
RNA expression pattern
Bgee	Human / Mouse (ortholog); Top expressed in: granulocyte; stromal cell of endometrium; monocyte; sural nerve; pituitary gland; anterior pituitary; right ovary; right lobe of liver; tendon of biceps brachii; canal of the cervix / Top expressed in: lumbar spinal ganglion; granulocyte; neural layer of retina; epithelium of small intestine; cerebellar cortex; thymus; zygote; genital tubercle; mucous cell of stomach; superior frontal gyrus; More reference expression data
BioGPS	More reference expression data
Gene ontology
Molecular function	DNA binding; DNA-binding transcription factor activity; protein binding; identical protein binding; ubiquitin-like protein ligase binding; DNA-binding transcription factor activity, RNA polymerase II-specific; signal transducer activity; RNA polymerase II cis-regulatory region sequence-specific DNA binding; DNA-binding transcription activator activity, RNA polymerase II-specific
Cellular component	plasma membrane; nucleoplasm; nucleus; cytoplasm; cytosol
Biological process	receptor signaling pathway via JAK-STAT; regulation of transcription, DNA-templated; regulation of transcription by RNA polymerase II; transcription, DNA-templated; viral process; signal transduction; regulation of protein phosphorylation; defense response to virus; regulation of mitochondrial fission; type I interferon signaling pathway; cytokine-mediated signaling pathway; defense response; regulation of cell population proliferation; response to peptide hormone; positive regulation of transcription by RNA polymerase II
Sources:Amigo / QuickGO
Orthologs
Databases	NCBI: entry; OMA: entry
Species	Human	Mouse
Entrez	6773	20847
Ensembl	ENSG00000170581	ENSMUSG00000040033
UniProt	P52630	Q9WVL2
RefSeq (mRNA)	NM_005419; NM_198332; NM_001385110; NM_001385111; NM_001385113 NM_001385114; NM_001385115	NM_019963
RefSeq (protein)	NP_005410; NP_938146	n/a
Location (UCSC)	Chr 12: 56.34 – 56.36 Mb	Chr 10: 128.11 – 128.13 Mb
PubMed search
- Wikidata
View/Edit Human	View/Edit Mouse

Signal transducer and activator of transcription 2 is a protein that in humans is encoded by the STAT2 gene. It is a member of the STAT protein family. This protein is critical to the biological response of type I interferons (IFNs). It functions as a transcription factor downstream of type I interferons. STAT2 sequence identity between mouse and human is only 68%.

== Function ==
The protein encoded by this gene is a member of the STAT protein family. In response to cytokines and growth factors, STAT family members are phosphorylated by the receptor associated kinases, and then form homo- or heterodimers that translocate to the cell nucleus where they act as transcription activators. In response to IFN, this protein forms a complex with STAT1 and IFN regulatory factor family protein p48 (IRF9) and form ISGF-3 (IFN-stimulated gene factor-3), in which this protein acts as a transactivator, but lacks the ability to bind DNA directly. The protein mediates innate antiviral activity. Mutations in this gene result in Immunodeficiency 44. ISGF-3 proceeds the activation of genes via the IFN-stimulated response element (ISRE). ISRE-driven genes include Ly-6C, the double-stranded RNA kinase (PKR), 2´ to 5´ oligoadenylate synthase (OAS), MX and potentially MHC class I. Transcription adaptor P300/CBP (EP300/CREBBP) has been shown to interact specifically with this protein, which is thought to be involved in the process of blocking IFN-alpha response by adenovirus.

STAT2 knockout mice are unresponsive to type I IFN and extremely vulnerable to viral infection. They indicate the loss of the type I IFN autocrine loop and several defects in macrophages and T cell responses. Stat2-/- cells show differences in the biological response to IFN-α.

== Interactions ==
STAT2 has been shown to interact with:

- CREB-binding protein,
- IFNAR1
- IFNAR2,
- IRF9,
- MED14,
- SMARCA4, and
- STAT1.

== STAT2 deficiency ==
=== Knockout mice ===
In double knockout STAT2 mice, an increased proliferation of M1, M2, and M1/M2 coexpressing macrophages during influenza-bacterial super-infection is observed. The bacterial clearance was also impaired by neutralization of IFN-γ (M1) and Arginase-1 (M2) what suggests that pulmonary macrophages expressing a mixed M1/M2 phenotype promote bacterial control during influenza-bacterial super-infection. Therefore the STAT2 signaling is associated with suppressing macrophage activation and bacterial control during influenza-bacterial super-infection. These mice demonstrate no developmental defects. The knockout STAT2 and double knockout STAT mice in Vesicular stromatitis Indiana virus (VSV) model produce at least 10 times more virus plaque-forming units than the wild type (WT). IFN-α pretreatment supplied protection in WT and STAT2^{±} cells but not in double knockout STAT2 cells. IFN-γ pretreatment did not provide any antiviral response during infection of VSV. This finding could be explained by the reduced level of STAT1 in cells of STAT2 knockout mice. Additionally, the double knockout STAT2 mice are more sensitive to mouse cytomegalovirus (MCMV), severe fever thrombocytopenia syndrome virus, influenza virus, dengue virus (DNV) and Zika virus than control mice, which suggests that STAT2 plays a critical role in the suppression of virus replication in mice.

==== Human autosomal recessive (AR) STAT2 deficiency ====
AR STAT2 deficiency was first time observed in 2 siblings. After routine immunization with measles-mump-rubella, one sibling developed disseminated vaccine-strain measles (MMR) but recovered and second sibling died in infancy from a viral infection due to primary immunodeficiency disorder. Later, the results showed that siblings were homozygous for absent expression of gene for STAT2. Patients with AR STAT2 deficiency have mutations which bring substitutions at important splice sites what leads to defected splicing and premature stop codons leading to a loss of expression of an interferon-stimulated gene. The typical clinical phenotype is disseminated infection after immunization with the live attenuated MMR vaccine. Some patients had also an onset of severe disease in infancy like infection with RSV, norovirus, coxsackievirus, adenovirus or enterovirus. One of the patients had CNS disease after the primary infection with EBV. EBV suppression was delayed in peripheral blood and cerebrospinal fluid as type I interferon signalling plays important role in the initial immune response against EBV. During next 3 years, PCR test showed persistent EBV presence in blood as well as in cerebrospinal fluid despite anti-EBV IgG. CMV and VZV infections were severe as well in few patients. The virus infection was treated by high-dose of intravenous immunoglobulin (IVIG) after which patients recovered and became afebrile within 24 hours. IVIG has anti-inflammatory effect and suggests that the passive immunization could help to control the ongoing viral infections. Therefore, the monthly IgG therapy could be beneficial for patients with STAT2 deficiency during childhood, until their adaptive immune system has sufficiently developed. From the age 5 years, the frequency and severity of viral infections decreased and the age of 10 years the patients were mostly off all medication. In general, the patients with STAT2 deficiency are relatively healthy with no specific defects in their adaptive immunity or developmental abnormalities. These findings show that type I IFN signaling through ISGF3 is not essential for host defense against the majority of common childhood viral pathogens. Despite a profoundly defective innate IFN response and evident susceptibility to some viral infections, STAT2-deficient individuals can live a relatively healthy life.

It was also reported a homozygous STAT2 missense mutation (R148W/Q) which results to a STAT2 gain of function underlying fatal early-onset autoinflammation in three patients. This mutation leads to a persistent type I IFN response due to defective binding of the mutated STAT2 to ubiquitin specific peptidase 1 (USP18) which is an essential in the negative autofeedback loop where USP18 sterically hinders the binding of JAK1 to IFNAR1. Therefore complete AR STAT2 deficiency usually causes disseminated LAV infection and recurrent natural viral infections. Penetrance is not complete for several viral infections and for complicated live measles vaccine disease. These observation suggest that the phenotype of AR STAT2 deficiency could range from asymptomatic (the healthy adult) to fatal (childhood death from a crushing viral disease). The phenotype is less severe than human complete AR STAT1 deficiency but more severe than IFNAR1 or IFNAR2 deficiency. The human phenotype is less severe than in mice.
