= STAT1 =

Transcription factor and coding gene in humans

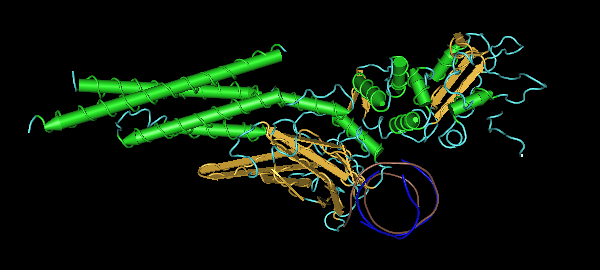

Identifiers
- Aliases: STAT1, CANDF7, IMD31A, IMD31B, IMD31C, ISGF-3, STAT91, signal transducer and activator of transcription 1
- External IDs: OMIM: 600555; MGI: 103063; GeneCards: STAT1
Available structures
PDB	Ortholog search: PDBe RCSB
PDB	List of PDB id codes 3WWT, 1BF5, 1YVL, 2KA6

Gene location (Human)
Chr.	Chromosome 2 (human)
Band	2q32.2	Start	190,908,460 bp
Band	2q32.2	End	191,020,960 bp

Gene location (Mouse)
Chr.	Chromosome 1 (mouse)
Band	1 C1.1|1 26.81 cM	Start	52,158,599 bp
Band	1 C1.1|1 26.81 cM	End	52,201,024 bp
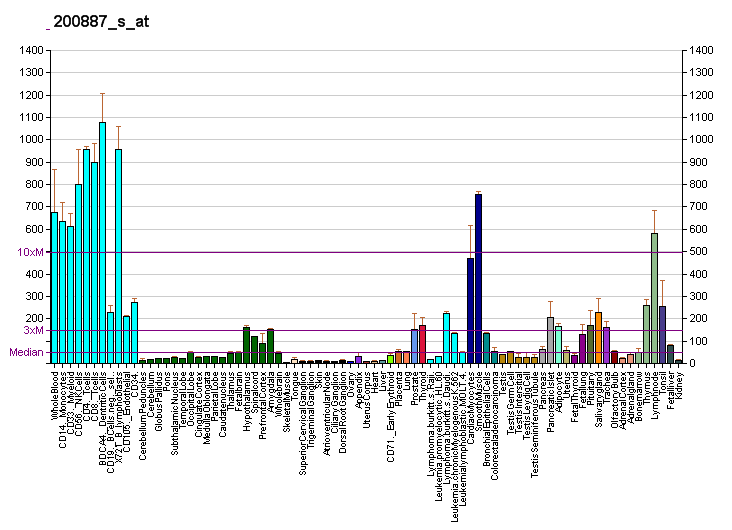
RNA expression pattern
Bgee	Human / Mouse (ortholog); Top expressed in: epithelium of nasopharynx; appendix; mononuclear cell; monocyte; decidua; endothelial cell; lymph node; glomerulus; granulocyte; metanephric glomerulus / Top expressed in: granulocyte; thymus; spleen; mesenteric lymph nodes; gastrula; submandibular gland; blood; epithelium of lens; subcutaneous adipose tissue; mucous cell of stomach; More reference expression data
BioGPS	More reference expression data
Gene ontology
Molecular function	DNA binding; protein homodimerization activity; DNA-binding transcription factor activity; RNA polymerase II general transcription initiation factor activity; signal transducer activity; RNA polymerase II cis-regulatory region sequence-specific DNA binding; protein binding; identical protein binding; enzyme binding; tumor necrosis factor receptor binding; double-stranded DNA binding; RNA polymerase II core promoter sequence-specific DNA binding; cadherin binding; histone acetyltransferase binding; histone binding; ubiquitin-like protein ligase binding; promoter-specific chromatin binding; sequence-specific DNA binding; DNA-binding transcription factor activity, RNA polymerase II-specific; transcription factor activity, RNA polymerase II core promoter proximal region sequence-specific binding; CCR5 chemokine receptor binding; protein phosphatase 2A binding; DNA-binding transcription activator activity, RNA polymerase II-specific
Cellular component	cytoplasm; nucleoplasm; nucleolus; perinuclear region of cytoplasm; nucleus; cytosol; axon; dendrite; protein-containing complex
Biological process	regulation of apoptotic process; metanephric mesenchymal cell proliferation involved in metanephros development; regulation of transcription, DNA-templated; cellular response to interferon-beta; regulation of transcription by RNA polymerase II; negative regulation of mesenchymal to epithelial transition involved in metanephros morphogenesis; metanephric mesenchymal cell differentiation; tumor necrosis factor-mediated signaling pathway; negative regulation of transcription by RNA polymerase II; renal tubule development; response to interferon-beta; negative regulation of I-kappaB kinase/NF-kappaB signaling; transcription, DNA-templated; negative regulation of endothelial cell proliferation; regulation of type I interferon-mediated signaling pathway; regulation of interferon-gamma-mediated signaling pathway; positive regulation of mesenchymal cell proliferation; negative regulation of metanephric nephron tubule epithelial cell differentiation; negative regulation of angiogenesis; negative regulation by virus of viral protein levels in host cell; viral process; endothelial cell migration; positive regulation of transcription by RNA polymerase II; signal transduction; macrophage derived foam cell differentiation; positive regulation of erythrocyte differentiation; type I interferon signaling pathway; cellular response to interferon-gamma; positive regulation of defense response to virus by host; positive regulation of interferon-alpha production; positive regulation of transcription, DNA-templated; defense response to virus; interferon-gamma-mediated signaling pathway; receptor signaling pathway via JAK-STAT; response to nutrient; blood circulation; positive regulation of cell population proliferation; response to mechanical stimulus; response to organic cyclic compound; cellular response to insulin stimulus; response to cytokine; response to hydrogen peroxide; response to peptide hormone; positive regulation of smooth muscle cell proliferation; response to cAMP; positive regulation of nitric-oxide synthase biosynthetic process; cellular response to cytokine stimulus; cellular response to organic cyclic compound; positive regulation of transcription of Notch receptor target; cytokine-mediated signaling pathway; interleukin-21-mediated signaling pathway; interleukin-6-mediated signaling pathway; interleukin-27-mediated signaling pathway; interleukin-35-mediated signaling pathway; interleukin-9-mediated signaling pathway; defense response; regulation of cell population proliferation
Sources:Amigo / QuickGO
Orthologs
Databases	NCBI: entry; OMA: entry
Species	Human	Mouse
Entrez	6772	20846
Ensembl	ENSG00000115415	ENSMUSG00000026104
UniProt	P42224	P42225
RefSeq (mRNA)	NM_007315; NM_139266	NM_001205313; NM_001205314; NM_009283; NM_001357627
RefSeq (protein)	NP_009330; NP_644671	n/a
Location (UCSC)	Chr 2: 190.91 – 191.02 Mb	Chr 1: 52.16 – 52.2 Mb
PubMed search
- Wikidata
View/Edit Human	View/Edit Mouse

Signal transducer and activator of transcription 1 (STAT1) is a transcription factor which in humans is encoded by the STAT1 gene. It is a member of the STAT protein family.

== Function ==
All STAT molecules are phosphorylated by receptor associated kinases, that causes activation, dimerization by forming homo- or heterodimers and finally translocate to nucleus to work as transcription factors. Specifically STAT1 can be activated by several ligands such as Interferon alpha (IFNα), Interferon gamma (IFNγ), Epidermal Growth Factor (EGF), Platelet Derived Growth Factor (PDGF), Interleukin 6 (IL-6), or IL-27.

Type I interferons (IFN-α, IFN-ß) bind to receptors, cause signaling via kinases, phosphorylate and activate the Jak kinases TYK2 and JAK1 and also STAT1 and STAT2. STAT molecules form dimers and bind to ISGF3G/IRF-9, which is Interferon stimulated gene factor 3 complex with Interferon regulatory Factor 9. This allows STAT1 to enter the nucleus. STAT1 has a key role in many gene expressions that cause survival of the cell, viability or pathogen response. There are two possible transcripts (due to alternative splicing) that encode 2 isoforms of STAT1. STAT1α, the full-length version of the protein, is the main active isoform, responsible for most of the known functions of STAT1. STAT1ß, which lacks a portion of the C-terminus of the protein, is less-studied, but has variously been reported to negatively regulate activation of STAT1 or to mediate IFN-γ-dependent anti-tumor and anti-infection activities.

STAT1 is involved in upregulating genes due to a signal by either type I, type II, or type III interferons. In response to IFN-γ stimulation, STAT1 forms homodimers or heterodimers with STAT3 that bind to the GAS (Interferon-Gamma-Activated Sequence) promoter element; in response to either IFN-α or IFN-β stimulation, STAT1 forms a heterodimer with STAT2 that can bind the ISRE (Interferon-Stimulated Response Element) promoter element. In either case, binding of the promoter element leads to an increased expression of ISG (Interferon-Stimulated Genes).

Expression of STAT1 can be induced with diallyl disulfide, a compound in garlic.

=== Mutations of STAT1 ===
Mutations in the STAT1 molecule can be gain of function (GOF) or loss of function (LOF). Both of them can cause different phenotypes and symptoms. Recurring common infections are frequent in both GOF and LOF mutations. In humans STAT1 has been particularly under strong purifying selection when populations shifted from hunting and gathering to farming, because this went along with a change in the pathogen spectrum.

==== Loss of function ====
STAT1 loss of function, therefore STAT1 deficiency can have many variants. There are two main genetic impairments that can cause response to interferons type I and III. First there can be autosomal recessive partial or even complete deficiency of STAT1. That causes intracellular bacterial diseases or viral infections and impaired IFN a, b, g and IL27 responses are diagnosed. In partial form there can also be found high levels of IFNg in blood serum. When tested from whole blood, monocytes do not respond to BCG and IFNg doses with IL-12 production. In complete recessive form there is a very low response to anti-viral and antimycotical medication. Second, partial STAT1 deficiency can also be an autosomal dominant mutation; phenotypically causing impaired IFNg responses and causing patients to suffer with selective intracellular bacterial diseases (MSMD).

In knock-out mice prepared in the 90s, a low amount of CD4^{+} and CD25^{+} regulatory T-cells and almost no IFNa, b and g response was discovered, which lead to parasital, viral and bacterial infections. The very first reported case of STAT1 deficiency in human was an autosomal dominant mutation and patients were showing propensity to mycobacterial infections. Another case reported was about an autosomal recessive form. 2 related patients had a homozygous missense STAT1 mutation which caused impaired splicing, therefore a defect in mature protein. Patients had partially damaged response to both IFNa and IFNg. Scientists now claim that recessive STAT1 deficiency is a new form of primary immunodeficiency and whenever a patient suffers sudden, severe and unexpected bacterial and viral infections, should be considered as potentially STAT1 deficient.

Interferons induce the formation of two transcriptional activators: gamma-activating factor (GAF) and interferon-stimulated gamma factor 3 (ISGF3). A natural heterozygous germline STAT1 mutation associated with susceptibility to mycobacterial but not viral disease was found in two unrelated patients with unexplained mycobacterial disease. This mutation caused a loss of GAF and ISGF3 activation but was dominant for one cellular phenotype and recessive for the other. It impaired the nuclear accumulation of GAF but not of ISGF3 in cells stimulated by interferons, implying that the antimycobacterial but not the antiviral effects of human interferons are mediated by GAF. More recently, two patients have been identified with homozygous STAT-1 mutations who developed both post–BCG vaccination disseminated disease and lethal viral infections. The mutations in these patients caused a complete lack of STAT-1 and resulted in a lack of formation of both GAF and ISGF3.

==== Gain of function ====
Gain of function mutation was first discovered in patients with chronic mucocutaneous candidiasis (CMC). This disease is characteristic with its symptoms as persistent infections of the skin, mucosae - oral or genital and nails infections caused by Candida, mostly Candida albicans. CMC may very often result from primary immunodeficiency. Patients with CMC often suffer also with bacterial infections (mostly Staphylococcus aureus), also with infections of the respiratory system and skin. In these patients we can also find viral infections caused mostly by Herpesviridae, that also affect the skin. The mycobacterial infections are often caused by Mycobacterium tuberculosis or environmental bacteria. Very common are also autoimmune symptoms like type 1 diabetes, cytopenia, regression of the thymus or systemic lupus erythematosus. When T-cell deficient, these autoimmune díseases are very common. CMC was also reported as a common symptom in patients with hyper immunoglobulin E syndrome (hyper-IgE) and with autoimmune polyendocrine syndrome type I. There was reported an interleukin 17A role, because of low levels of IL-17A producing T-cells in CMC patients.

With various genomic and genetic methods was discovered, that a heterozygous gain of function mutation of STAT1 is a cause of more than a half CMC cases. This mutation is caused by defect in the coiled-coil domain, domain that binds DNA, N-terminal domain or SH2 domain. Because of this there is increased phosphorylation because of impossible dephosphorylation in nucleus. These processes are dependent on cytokines like interferon alpha or beta, interferon gamma or interleukin 27. As mentioned above, low levels of interleukin 17A were observed, therefore impaired the Th17 polarization of the immune response.

Patients with STAT1 gain of function mutation and CMC poorly or not at all respond to treatment with azole drugs such as Fluconazole, Itraconazole or Posaconazole. Besides common viral and bacterial infections, these patients develop autoimmunities or even carcinomas. It is very complicated to find a treatment because of various symptoms and resistances, inhibitors of JAK/STAT pathway such as Ruxolitinib are being tested and are a possible choice of treatment for these patients.

== Interactions ==
STAT1 has been shown to interact with:

- BRCA1,
- C-jun,
- CD117,
- CREB-binding protein,
- Calcitriol receptor,
- Epidermal growth factor receptor,
- Fanconi anemia, complementation group C,
- GNB2L1,
- IFNAR2,
- IRF1,
- ISGF3G
- Interleukin 27 receptor, alpha subunit,
- MCM5,
- Mammalian target of rapamycin,
- PIAS1,
- PRKCD,
- PTK2,
- Protein kinase R,
- STAT2,
- STAT3,
- Src, and
- TRADD.
