= Interferon =

Signaling proteins released by cells in response to the presence of viruses

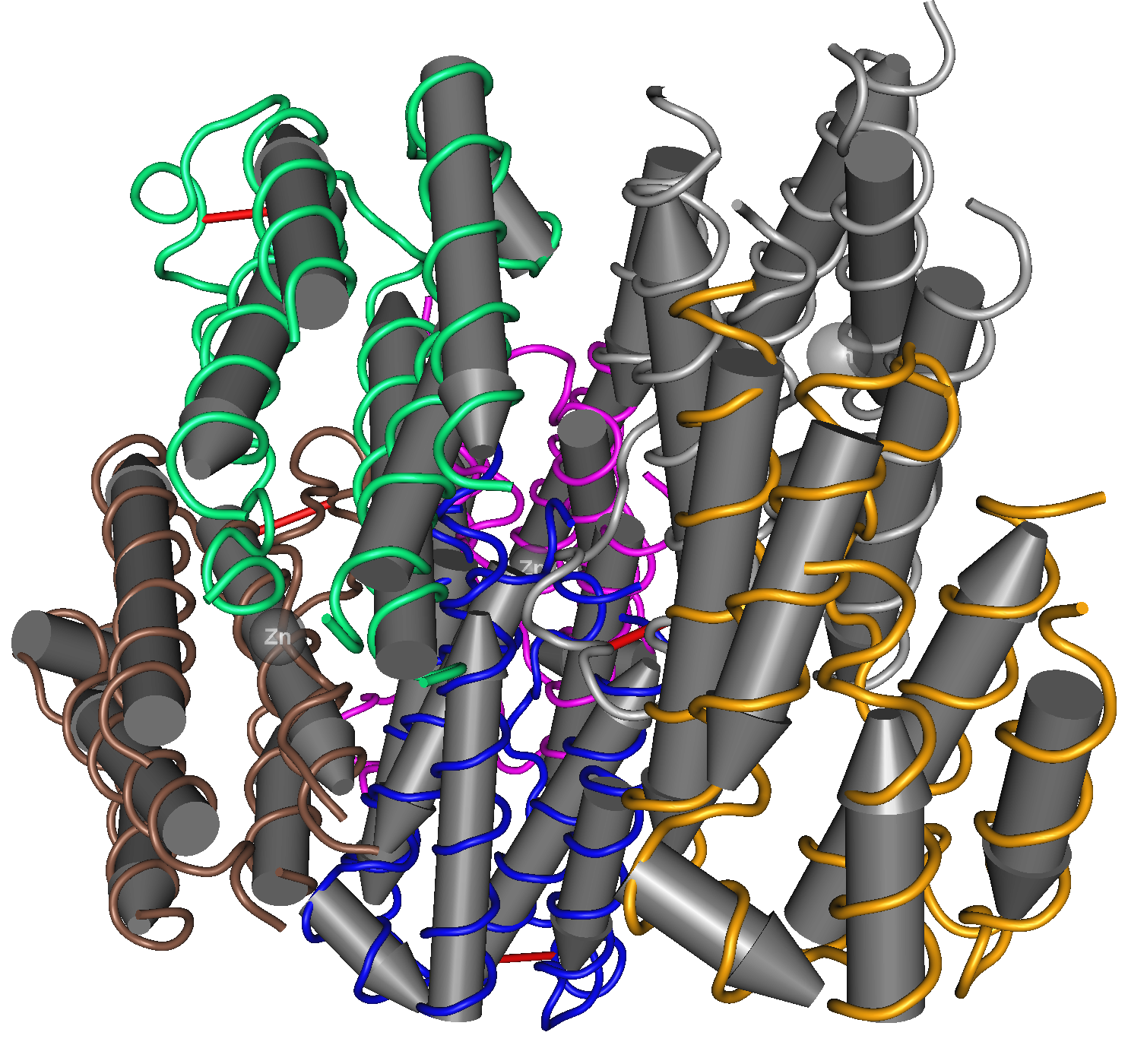
- The molecular structure of human interferon-alpha (PDB: 1RH2)

Identifiers
- Symbol: Interferons
- Pfam: PF00143
- InterPro: IPR000471
- SMART: SM00076
- PROSITE: PDOC00225
- CATH: 1au0
- SCOP2: 1au1 / SCOPe / SUPFAM
- CDD: cd00095
Available protein structures:
- PDB: IPR000471 PF00143 (ECOD; PDBsum)
- AlphaFold: IPR000471; PF00143

Interferon type II (γ)
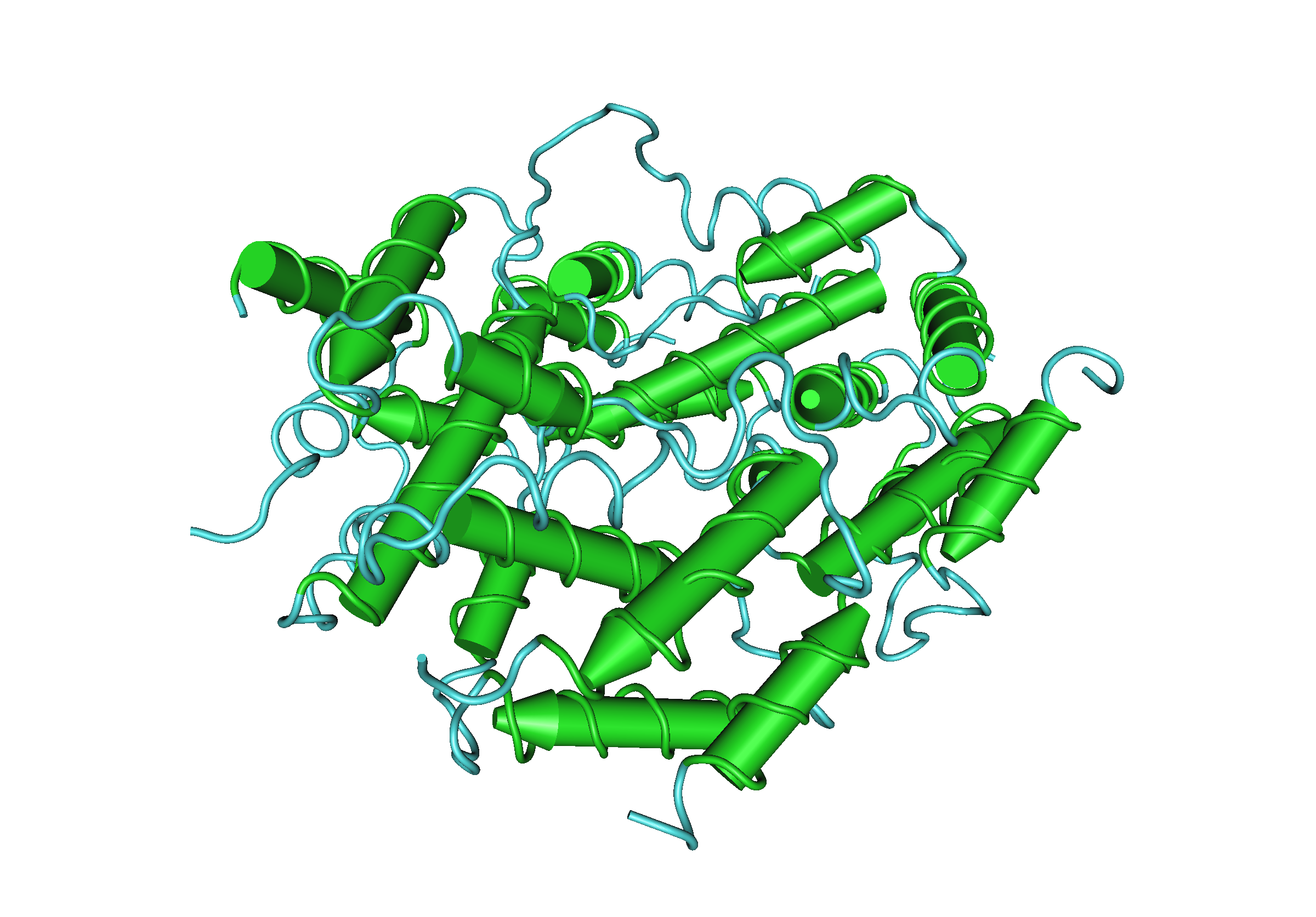
- The three-dimensional structure of human interferon gamma (PDB: 1HIG)

Identifiers
- Symbol: IFN-gamma
- Pfam: PF00714
- InterPro: IPR002069
- CATH: 1d9cA00
- SCOP2: d1d9ca_ / SCOPe / SUPFAM
Available protein structures:
- PDB: IPR002069 PF00714 (ECOD; PDBsum)
- AlphaFold: IPR002069; PF00714

Interferon type III (λ)

Identifiers
- Symbol: IL28A
- Pfam: PF15177
- InterPro: IPR029177
- CATH: 3og6A00
Available protein structures:
- PDB: IPR029177 PF15177 (ECOD; PDBsum)
- AlphaFold: IPR029177; PF15177

Interferons (IFNs, /ˌɪntərˈfɪərɒn/ IN-tər-FEER-on) are a group of signaling proteins made and released by host cells in response to the presence of several viruses. In a typical scenario, a virus-infected cell will release interferons causing nearby cells to heighten their anti-viral defenses.

IFNs belong to the large class of proteins known as cytokines, molecules used for communication between cells to trigger the protective defenses of the immune system that help eradicate pathogens. Interferons are named for their ability to "interfere" with viral replication by protecting cells from virus infections. However, virus-encoded genetic elements have the ability to antagonize the IFN response, contributing to viral pathogenesis and viral diseases. IFNs also have various other functions: they activate immune cells, such as natural killer cells and macrophages, and they increase host defenses by up-regulating antigen presentation by virtue of increasing the expression of major histocompatibility complex (MHC) antigens. Certain symptoms of infections, such as fever, muscle pain and "flu-like symptoms", are also caused by the production of IFNs and other cytokines.

More than twenty distinct IFN genes and proteins have been identified in animals, including humans. They are typically divided among three classes: Type I IFN, Type II IFN, and Type III IFN. IFNs belonging to all three classes are important for fighting viral infections and for the regulation of the immune system.

== Types of interferon ==
Based on the type of receptor through which they signal, human interferons have been classified into three major types.

Interferon type I
All type I IFNs bind to a specific cell surface receptor complex known as the IFN-α/β receptor (IFNAR) that consists of IFNAR1 and IFNAR2 chains. The type I interferons present in humans are IFN-α, IFN-β, IFN-ε, IFN-κ and IFN-ω. Interferon beta (IFN-β) can be produced by all nucleated cells when they recognize that a virus has invaded them. The most prolific producers of IFN-α and IFN-β are plasmacytoid dendritic cells circulating in the blood. Monocytes and macrophages can also produce large amounts of type I interferons when stimulated by viral molecular patterns. The production of type I IFN-α is inhibited by another cytokine known as Interleukin-10. Once released, type I interferons bind to the IFN-α/β receptor on target cells, which leads to expression of proteins that will prevent the virus from producing and replicating its RNA and DNA. Overall, IFN-α can be used to treat hepatitis B and C infections, while IFN-β can be used to treat multiple sclerosis.
Interferon type II
IFN type II binds to the interferon-gamma receptor (IFNGR), which consists of IFNGR1 and IFNGR2 chains. This group is also known as immune interferon and is activated by Interleukin-12. In most tetrapods (including humans), the only group is IFN-γ. Type II interferons are also released by cytotoxic T cells and T_{h}1 cells. However, they block the proliferation of T_{h}2 cells. The previous results in an inhibition of T_{h}2 cells immune response and a further induction of T_{h}1 immune response.
Interferon type III
IFN type III signals through the interferon-lambda receptor (IFNLR) consisting of IL10R2 (also called CRF2-4) and IFNLR1 (also called CRF2-12). In most tetrapods (including humans), the only group is IFN-λ. Although discovered more recently than type I and type II IFNs, recent information demonstrates the importance of Type III IFNs in some types of virus or fungal infections.

In general, type I and II interferons are responsible for regulating and activating the immune response. Expression of type I and III IFNs can be induced in virtually all cell types upon recognition of viral components, especially nucleic acids, by cytoplasmic and endosomal receptors, whereas type II interferon is induced by cytokines such as IL-12, and its expression is restricted to immune cells such as T cells and NK cells.

== Function ==
All interferons share several common effects: they are antiviral agents and they modulate functions of the immune system. Administration of Type I IFN has been shown experimentally to inhibit tumor growth in animals, but the beneficial action in human tumors has not been widely documented. A virus-infected cell releases viral particles that can infect nearby cells. However, the infected cell can protect neighboring cells against a potential infection of the virus by releasing interferons. In response to interferon, cells produce large amounts of an enzyme known as protein kinase R (PKR). This enzyme phosphorylates a protein known as eIF-2 in response to new viral infections; the phosphorylated eIF-2 forms an inactive complex with another protein, called eIF2B, to reduce protein synthesis within the cell. Another cellular enzyme, RNAse L—also induced by interferon action—destroys RNA within the cells to further reduce protein synthesis from both viral and host genes. Inhibited protein synthesis impairs both virus replication and infected host cells. In addition, interferons induce production of hundreds of other proteins—known collectively as interferon-stimulated genes (ISGs)—that have roles in combating viruses and other actions produced by interferon. They also limit viral spread by increasing p53 activity, which kills virus-infected cells by promoting apoptosis. The effect of IFN on p53 is also linked to its protective role against certain cancers.

Another function of interferons is to up-regulate major histocompatibility complex molecules, MHC I and MHC II, and increase immunoproteasome activity. All interferons significantly enhance the presentation of MHC I dependent antigens. Interferon gamma (IFN-gamma) also significantly stimulates the MHC II-dependent presentation of antigens. Higher MHC I expression increases presentation of viral and abnormal peptides from cancer cells to cytotoxic T cells, while the immunoproteasome processes these peptides for loading onto the MHC I molecule, thereby increasing the recognition and killing of infected or malignant cells. Higher MHC II expression increases presentation of these peptides to helper T cells; these cells release cytokines (such as more interferons and interleukins, among others) that signal to and co-ordinate the activity of other immune cells.

Interferons can also suppress angiogenesis by down regulation of angiogenic stimuli deriving from tumor cells. They also suppress the proliferation of endothelial cells. Such suppression causes a decrease in tumor angiogenesis, a decrease in its vascularization and subsequent growth inhibition. Interferons, such as interferon gamma, directly activate other immune cells, such as macrophages and natural killer cells.

== Induction of interferons ==
Production of interferons occurs mainly in response to microbes, such as viruses and bacteria, and their products. Binding of molecules uniquely found in microbes—viral glycoproteins, viral RNA, bacterial endotoxin (lipopolysaccharide), bacterial flagella, CpG motifs—by pattern recognition receptors, such as membrane bound toll like receptors or the cytoplasmic receptors RIG-I or MDA5, can trigger release of IFNs. Toll Like Receptor 3 (TLR3) is important for inducing interferons in response to the presence of double-stranded RNA viruses; the ligand for this receptor is double-stranded RNA (dsRNA). After binding dsRNA, this receptor activates the transcription factors IRF3 and NF-κB, which are important for initiating synthesis of many inflammatory proteins. RNA interference technology tools such as siRNA or vector-based reagents can either silence or stimulate interferon pathways. Release of IFN from cells (specifically IFN-γ in lymphoid cells) is also induced by mitogens. Other cytokines, such as interleukin 1, interleukin 2, interleukin-12, tumor necrosis factor and colony-stimulating factor, can also enhance interferon production.

== Downstream signaling ==
By interacting with their specific receptors, IFNs activate signal transducer and activator of transcription (STAT) complexes; STATs are a family of transcription factors that regulate the expression of certain immune system genes. Some STATs are activated by both type I and type II IFNs. However each IFN type can also activate unique STATs.

STAT activation initiates the most well-defined cell signaling pathway for all IFNs, the classical Janus kinase-STAT (JAK-STAT) signaling pathway. In this pathway, JAKs associate with IFN receptors and, following receptor engagement with IFN, phosphorylate both STAT1 and STAT2. As a result, an IFN-stimulated gene factor 3 (ISGF3) complex forms—this contains STAT1, STAT2 and a third transcription factor called IRF9—and moves into the cell nucleus. Inside the nucleus, the ISGF3 complex binds to specific nucleotide sequences called IFN-stimulated response elements (ISREs) in the promoters of certain genes, known as IFN stimulated genes ISGs. Binding of ISGF3 and other transcriptional complexes activated by IFN signaling to these specific regulatory elements induces transcription of those genes. A collection of known ISGs is available on Interferome, a curated online database of ISGs (www.interferome.org); Additionally, STAT homodimers or heterodimers form from different combinations of STAT-1, -3, -4, -5, or -6 during IFN signaling; these dimers initiate gene transcription by binding to IFN-activated site (GAS) elements in gene promoters. Type I IFNs can induce expression of genes with either ISRE or GAS elements, but gene induction by type II IFN can occur only in the presence of a GAS element.

In addition to the JAK-STAT pathway, IFNs can activate several other signaling cascades. For instance, both type I and type II IFNs activate a member of the CRK family of adaptor proteins called CRKL, a nuclear adaptor for STAT5 that also regulates signaling through the C3G/Rap1 pathway. Type I IFNs further activate p38 mitogen-activated protein kinase (MAP kinase) to induce gene transcription. Antiviral and antiproliferative effects specific to type I IFNs result from p38 MAP kinase signaling. The phosphatidylinositol 3-kinase (PI3K) signaling pathway is also regulated by both type I and type II IFNs. PI3K activates P70-S6 Kinase 1, an enzyme that increases protein synthesis and cell proliferation; phosphorylates ribosomal protein s6, which is involved in protein synthesis; and phosphorylates a translational repressor protein called eukaryotic translation-initiation factor 4E-binding protein 1 (EIF4EBP1) in order to deactivate it.

Interferons can disrupt signaling by other stimuli. For example, interferon alpha induces RIG-G, which disrupts the CSN5-containing COP9 signalosome (CSN), a highly conserved multiprotein complex implicated in protein deneddylation, deubiquitination, and phosphorylation. RIG-G has shown the capacity to inhibit NF-κB and STAT3 signaling in lung cancer cells, which demonstrates the potential of type I IFNs.

== Viral resistance to interferons ==
Many viruses have evolved mechanisms to resist interferon activity. They circumvent the IFN response by blocking downstream signaling events that occur after the cytokine binds to its receptor, by preventing further IFN production, and by inhibiting the functions of proteins that are induced by IFN. Viruses that inhibit IFN signaling include Japanese Encephalitis Virus (JEV), dengue type 2 virus (DEN-2), and viruses of the herpesvirus family, such as human cytomegalovirus (HCMV) and Kaposi's sarcoma-associated herpesvirus (KSHV or HHV8). Viral proteins proven to affect IFN signaling include EBV nuclear antigen 1 (EBNA1) and EBV nuclear antigen 2 (EBNA-2) from Epstein-Barr virus, the large T antigen of Polyomavirus, the E7 protein of Human papillomavirus (HPV), and the B18R protein of vaccinia virus. Reducing IFN-α activity may prevent signaling via STAT1, STAT2, or IRF9 (as with JEV infection) or through the JAK-STAT pathway (as with DEN-2 infection). Several poxviruses encode soluble IFN receptor homologs—like the B18R protein of the vaccinia virus—that bind to and prevent IFN interacting with its cellular receptor, impeding communication between this cytokine and its target cells. Some viruses can encode proteins that bind to double-stranded RNA (dsRNA) to prevent the activity of RNA-dependent protein kinases; this is the mechanism reovirus adopts using its sigma 3 (σ3) protein, and vaccinia virus employs using the gene product of its E3L gene, p25. The ability of interferon to induce protein production from interferon stimulated genes (ISGs) can also be affected. Production of protein kinase R, for example, can be disrupted in cells infected with JEV. Some viruses escape the anti-viral activities of interferons by gene (and thus protein) mutation. The H5N1 influenza virus, also known as bird flu, has resistance to interferon and other anti-viral cytokines that is attributed to a single amino acid change in its Non-Structural Protein 1 (NS1), although the precise mechanism of how this confers immunity is unclear. The relative resistance of hepatitis C virus genotype I to interferon-based therapy has been attributed in part to homology between viral envelope protein E2 and host protein kinase R, a mediator of interferon-induced suppression of viral protein translation, although mechanisms of acquired and intrinsic resistance to interferon therapy in HCV are polyfactorial.

== Coronavirus response ==
Coronaviruses evade innate immunity during the first ten days of viral infection. In the early stages of infection, SARS-CoV-2 induces an even lower interferon type I (IFN-I) response than SARS-CoV, which itself is a weak IFN-I inducer in human cells. SARS-CoV-2 limits the IFN-III response as well. Reduced numbers of plasmacytoid dendritic cells with age is associated with increased COVID-19 severity, possibly because these cells are substantial interferon producers.

Ten percent of patients with life-threatening COVID-19 have autoantibodies against type I interferon.

Delayed IFN-I response contributes to the pathogenic inflammation (cytokine storm) seen in later stages of COVID-19 disease. Application of IFN-I prior to (or in the very early stages of) viral infection can be protective, which should be validated in randomized clinical trials.

With pegylated IFN lambda, the relative risk for hospitalization with the Omicron strains is reduced by about 80 %.

== Interferon therapy ==
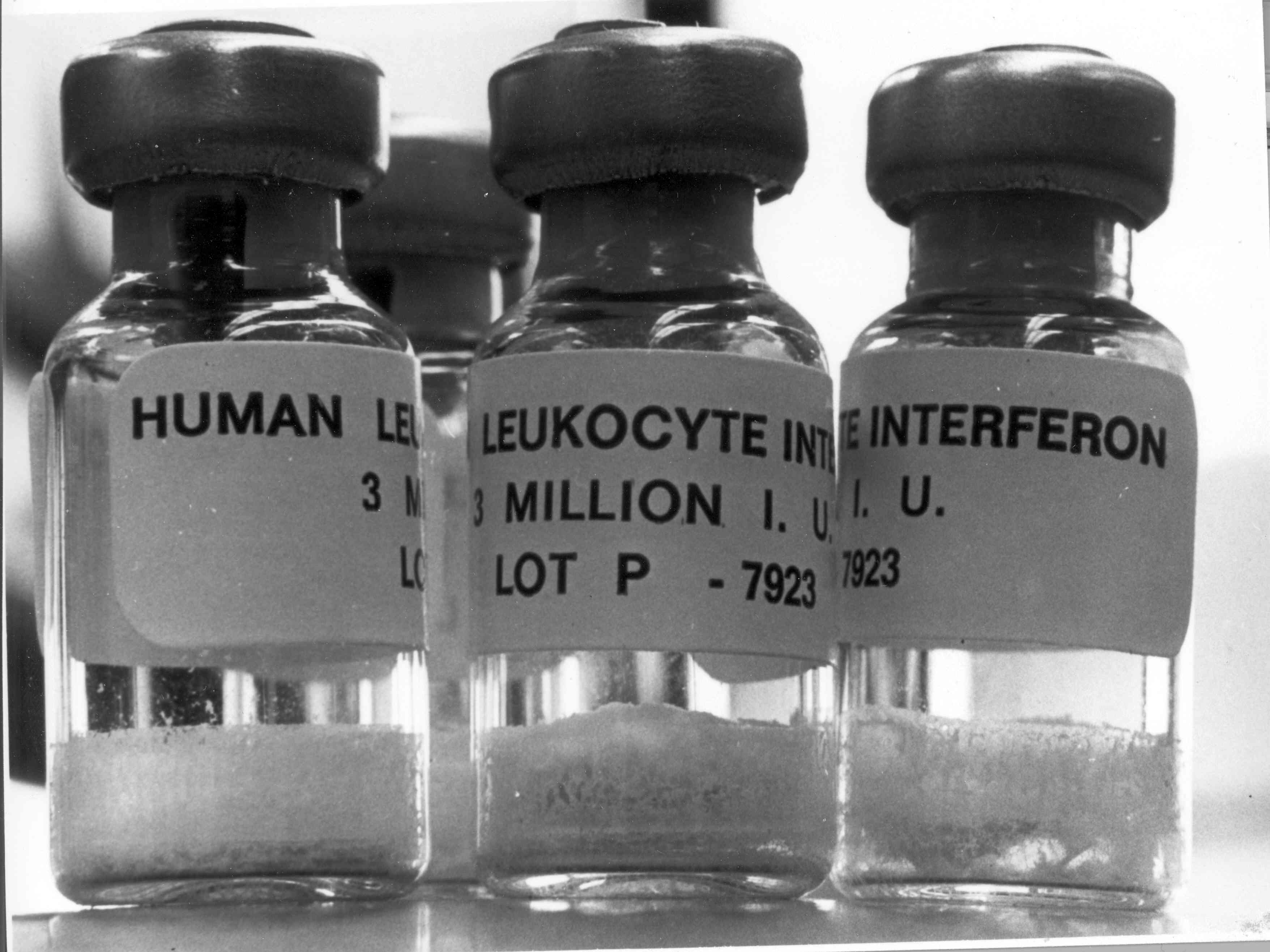
Three vials filled with human leukocyte interferon

=== Diseases ===
Interferon beta-1a and interferon beta-1b are used to treat and control multiple sclerosis, an autoimmune disorder. This treatment may help in reducing attacks in relapsing-remitting multiple sclerosis and slowing disease progression and activity in secondary progressive multiple sclerosis.

Interferon therapy is used (in combination with chemotherapy and radiation) as a treatment for some cancers. This treatment can be used in hematological malignancy, such as in leukemia and lymphomas including hairy cell leukemia, chronic myeloid leukemia, nodular lymphoma, and cutaneous T-cell lymphoma. Patients with recurrent melanomas receive recombinant IFN-α2b.

Both hepatitis B and hepatitis C can be treated with IFN-α, often in combination with other antiviral drugs. Some of those treated with interferon have a sustained virological response and can eliminate hepatitis virus in the case of hepatitis C. The most common strain of hepatitis C virus (HCV) worldwide—genotype I— can be treated with interferon-α, ribavirin and protease inhibitors such as telaprevir, boceprevir or the nucleotide analog polymerase inhibitor sofosbuvir. Biopsies of patients given the treatment show reductions in liver damage and cirrhosis. Control of chronic hepatitis C by IFN is associated with reduced hepatocellular carcinoma. A single nucleotide polymorphism (SNP) in the gene encoding the type III interferon IFN-λ3 was found to be protective against chronic infection following proven HCV infection and predicted treatment response to interferon-based regimens. The frequency of the SNP differed significantly by race, partly explaining observed differences in response to interferon therapy between European-Americans and African-Americans.

Unconfirmed results suggested that interferon eye drops may be an effective treatment for people who have herpes simplex virus epithelial keratitis, a type of eye infection. There is no clear evidence to suggest that removing the infected tissue (debridement) followed by interferon drops is an effective treatment approach for these types of eye infections. Unconfirmed results suggested that the combination of interferon and an antiviral agent may speed the healing process compared to antiviral therapy alone.

When used in systemic therapy, IFNs are mostly administered by an intramuscular injection. The injection of IFNs in the muscle or under the skin is generally well tolerated. The most frequent adverse effects are flu-like symptoms: increased body temperature, feeling ill, fatigue, headache, muscle pain, convulsion, dizziness, and hair thinning. IFN treatment has been associated with neuropsychiatric adverse effects such as depression, anxiety, irritability, and sleep disturbance. Local injection site reactions, particularly erythema, pain, and induration, are also frequently observed. IFN therapy causes immunosuppression, in particular through neutropenia, and can result in some infections manifesting in unusual ways.

=== Drug formulations ===
Pharmaceutical forms of interferons
Generic name	Brand name
Interferon alfa (human leukocyte)	Multiferon
Interferon alpha 2a	Roferon A
Interferon alpha 2b	Intron A/Reliferon/Uniferon
Interferon beta 1a, liquid form	Rebif
Interferon beta 1a, lyophilized	Avonex
Interferon beta 1a, biogeneric (Iran)	Cinnovex
Interferon beta 1b	Betaseron / Betaferon
Interferon gamma 1b	Actimmune
PEGylated interferon alpha 2a	Pegasys
PEGylated interferon alpha 2a (Egypt)	Reiferon Retard
PEGylated interferon alpha 2b	PegIntron
Ropeginterferon alfa-2b	Besremi
PEGylated interferon alpha 2b plus ribavirin (Canada)	Pegetron

Several different types of interferons are approved for use in humans. One was first approved for medical use in 1986. For example, in January 2001, the Food and Drug Administration (FDA) approved the use of PEGylated interferon-alpha in the USA; in this formulation, PEGylated interferon-alpha-2b (Pegintron), polyethylene glycol is linked to the interferon molecule to make the interferon last longer in the body. Approval for PEGylated interferon-alpha-2a (Pegasys) followed in October 2002. These PEGylated drugs are injected once weekly, rather than administering two or three times per week, as is necessary for conventional interferon-alpha. When used with the antiviral drug ribavirin, PEGylated interferon is effective in treatment of hepatitis C; at least 75% of people with hepatitis C genotypes 2 or 3 benefit from interferon treatment, although this is effective in less than 50% of people infected with genotype 1 (the more common form of hepatitis C virus in both the U.S. and Western Europe). Interferon-containing regimens may also include protease inhibitors such as boceprevir and telaprevir.

There are also interferon-inducing drugs, notably tilorone that is shown to be effective against Ebola virus.

=== Veterinary medicine ===
Pharmaceutical forms of non-human interferons
UniProt	Generic name	Brand name
Q867A7	Interferon alfa-4, canine (1AK1, alpha-3, alpha-5)	(Not marketed)
Q9N2J0	Interferon beta, feline	(Not marketed)
P42161	Interferon gamma, canine	(Not marketed)
P35849	Interferon omega, feline (1AK3; actually alpha-7)	Virbagen Omega, Intercat

Human interferon drugs (mainly versions of IFNα) are also used to treat other mammals because they can activate the interferon receptors of these other animals. There are also recombinant versions of animal interferons that have been used clinically.

Interferon also appears to work across species among some birds. Chicken IFNα is recognized by chicken, duck, and turkey cells. Chicken cells recognize pigeon and turkey IFNγ.

== History ==
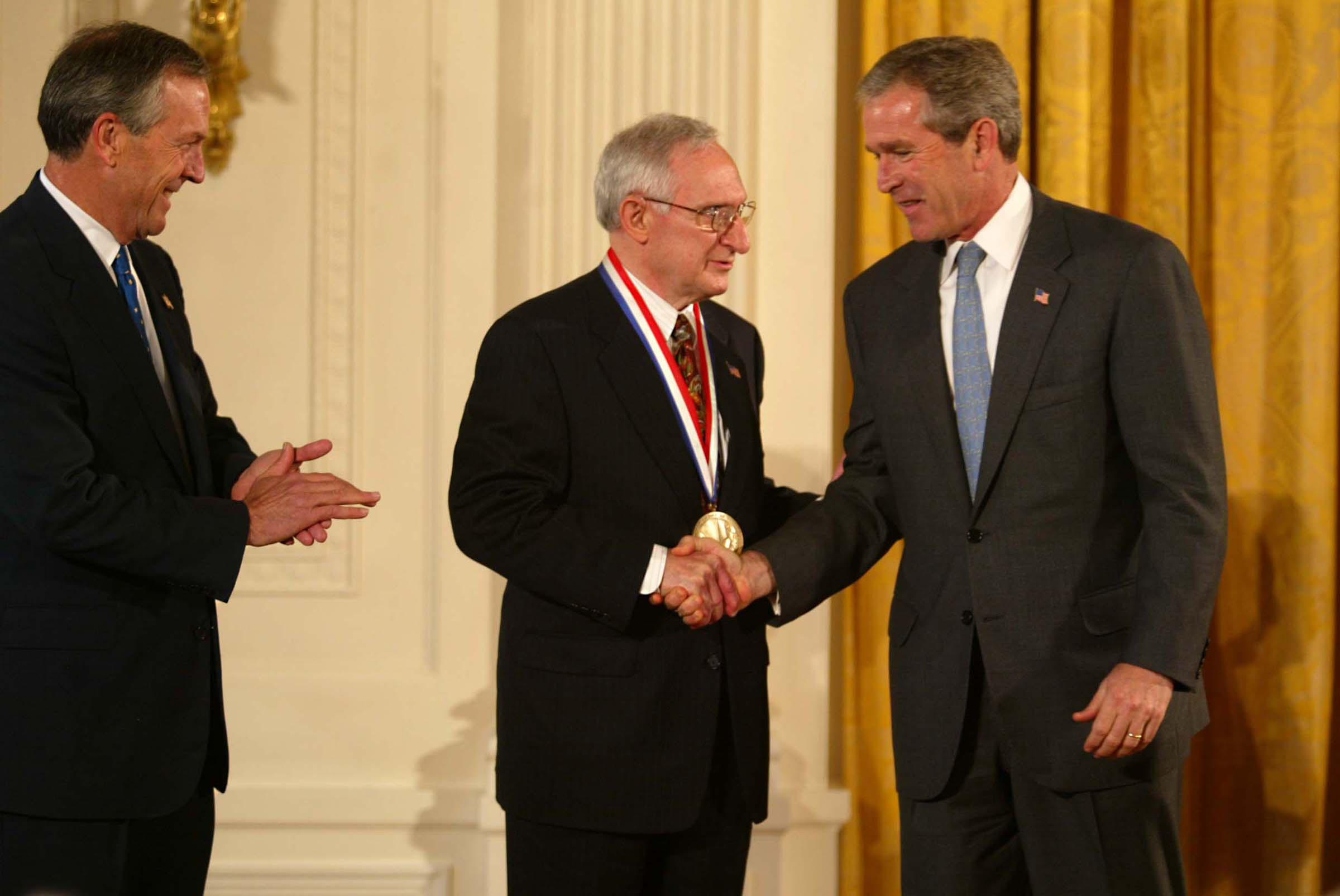
Sidney Pestka of Rutgers University, seen here receiving the National Medal of Technology

Interferons were first described in 1957 by Alick Isaacs and Jean Lindenmann at the National Institute for Medical Research in London; the discovery was a result of their studies of viral interference. Viral interference refers to the inhibition of virus growth caused by previous exposure of cells to an active or a heat-inactivated virus. Isaacs and Lindenmann were working with a system that involved the inhibition of the growth of live influenza virus in chicken embryo chorioallantoic membranes by heat-inactivated influenza virus. Their experiments revealed that this interference was mediated by a protein released by cells in the heat-inactivated influenza virus-treated membranes. They published their results in 1957 naming the antiviral factor they had discovered interferon. The findings of Isaacs and Lindenmann have been widely confirmed and corroborated in the literature.

Furthermore, others may have made observations on interferons before the 1957 publication of Isaacs and Lindenmann. For example, during research to produce a more efficient vaccine for smallpox, Yasu-ichi Nagano and Yasuhiko Kojima—two Japanese virologists working at the Institute for Infectious Diseases at the University of Tokyo—noticed inhibition of viral growth in an area of rabbit-skin or testis previously inoculated with UV-inactivated virus. They hypothesised that some "viral inhibitory factor" was present in the tissues infected with virus and attempted to isolate and characterize this factor from tissue homogenates. Independently, Monto Ho, in John Enders's lab, observed in 1957 that attenuated poliovirus conferred a species specific anti-viral effect in human amniotic cell cultures. They described these observations in a 1959 publication, naming the responsible factor viral inhibitory factor (VIF). It took another fifteen to twenty years, using somatic cell genetics, to show that the interferon action gene and interferon gene reside in different human chromosomes. The purification of human beta interferon did not occur until 1977. Y.H. Tan and his co-workers purified and produced biologically active, radio-labeled human beta interferon by superinducing the interferon gene in fibroblast cells, and they showed its active site contains tyrosine residues. Tan's laboratory isolated sufficient amounts of human beta interferon to perform the first amino acid, sugar composition and N-terminal analyses. They showed that human beta interferon was an unusually hydrophobic glycoprotein. This explained the large loss of interferon activity when preparations were transferred from test tube to test tube or from vessel to vessel during purification. The analyses showed the reality of interferon activity by chemical verification. The purification of human alpha interferon was not reported until 1978. A series of publications from the laboratories of Sidney Pestka and Alan Waldman between 1978 and 1981, describe the purification of the type I interferons IFN-α and IFN-β. By the early 1980s, genes for these interferons had been cloned, adding further definitive proof that interferons were responsible for interfering with viral replication. Gene cloning also confirmed that IFN-α was encoded by a family of many related genes. The type II IFN (IFN-γ) gene was also isolated around this time.

Interferon was first synthesized manually at Rockefeller University in the lab of Dr. Bruce Merrifield, using solid phase peptide synthesis, one amino acid at a time. He later won the Nobel Prize in chemistry. Interferon was scarce and expensive until 1980, when the interferon gene was inserted into bacteria using recombinant DNA technology, allowing mass cultivation and purification from bacterial cultures or derived from yeasts. Interferon can also be produced by recombinant mammalian cells. Before the early 1970s, large scale production of human interferon had been pioneered by Kari Cantell. He produced large amounts of human alpha interferon from large quantities of human white blood cells collected by the Finnish Blood Bank. Large amounts of human beta interferon were made by superinducing the beta interferon gene in human fibroblast cells.

Cantell's and Tan's methods of making large amounts of natural interferon were critical for chemical characterisation, clinical trials and the preparation of small amounts of interferon messenger RNA to clone the human alpha and beta interferon genes. The superinduced human beta interferon messenger RNA was prepared by Tan's lab for Cetus. to clone the human beta interferon gene in bacteria and the recombinant interferon was developed as 'betaseron' and approved for the treatment of MS. Superinduction of the human beta interferon gene was also used by Israeli scientists to manufacture human beta interferon.

== Evolution ==
- - IL
    - IL-22
    - - - - IL-20
          - IL-19
        - IL-24
      - - IL-26
        - IL-10
  - IFN
    - - - - Type I
          - Type IV
        - Type III
      - Jawless
    - - Type II
      - Lancelet

Wang et al. (2026), using IL-10 and relatives as the outgroup

Both lancelets and lampreys have a primitive but functional interferon system that responds to their versions of interferons by upregulating gene similar to the well-known interferon-stimulated genes (LSGs) of land animals. The lamprey interferon receptor has also been identified as a heterodimer of the cytokine receptor family B (CRFB) family, much like in jawed vertebrates. By comparing the genome organizations of jawed fish, jawless fish, and lancelet, it was found that interferons arose by a duplication of interleukin 10 in a chordate ancestor to the vertebrates and the lancelets.

By the time the bony fish (e.g. teleosts, tetrapods including humans) diverged from the cartilaginous fish (e.g. sharks), the duplication and specialization of interferon into types I, II (gamma), III (lambda), and IV had been complete. (This is known because types I, II, IV have been found in tetrapods, teleosts, and sharks, and that type III has been found in tetrapods and sharks.)

Mammals, actually amniotes in general, are unlike the rest of the animal kingdom in that most of their type I IFNs are intronless, and are placed in a position not colinear with the other vertebrates. This is because the original type I IFN gene was copied in an intronless form (possibly by a retrotransposon acting on mRNA) to a new location between HACD4 and MTAP in a common ancestor of the amniotes, followed by a loss of the ancestral version. This single-exon gene was then duplicated in the stem amniote into the three subclasses of interferons, Ia (alpha, beta, delta, epsilon, sigma, nu, omega) Ib (kappa), and Ic (subsequently lost in mammals). The evolution of the Type I IFNs was characterized by extensive gene duplication and non-allelic homologous recombination (NAHR) between the many copies. The NAHR causes further duplication and also homogenizes the blocks by gene conversion. In catarrhine primates (including humans), the region between IFNA14 and IFNA21 remains a recombination hotspot.

The evolution of types II and III in amniotes had been a lot less eventful as they generally stayed in the same location from shark to amniotes (between DYRK2 and IL22 for type II, near SYCN, SUPT5H, or TIMM50 for type III), with the exception of the birds and reptiles having duplicated their type II to the so-called IFNLB loci. The loss of introns in type III IFNs happened independently in a few tetrapod groups. Type IV (upsilon) stayed in the same location between the zebrafish and the chicken (between ADARB2 and PFKP) but was lost in humans.

The nomenclature of interferons is inconsistent between species, growing in chaoticness as the distance from humans increase. For example, among reptiles, "IFN I" refers to interferon Type Ic and "IFN III" and "IFN IV" are sibling branches of type Ia. Due to the many gene conversion events, using the sequence alone does not always show the correct gene-to-gene correspondence (orthology) and colinearity is needed.

=== Human interferons ===
Full list:

- IFNA1
- IFNA2
- IFNA4
- IFNA5
- IFNA6
- IFNA7
- IFNA8
- IFNA10
- IFNA13
- IFNA14
- IFNA16
- IFNA17
- IFNA21
- IFNB1
- IFNG
- IFNW1
- IFNE1
- IFNK
- IFNL1
- IFNL2
- IFNL3
- IFNL4

Humans and also carry many interferon pseudogenes, including the entire nu family (IFNNΨ), an ortholog of IFNW1 (IFNWXΨ), a singular delta pseudogene (IFNDΨ), and a few members of the alpha and omega families. Many of these loci are also pseudogenes in other mammals. Consult the HGNC website for a full list of officially named genes and pseudogenes.

=== Teleost fish interferons ===
Like tetrapods, teleost (ray-finned) fish, including the zebrafish and salmons, belong to the group of bony fish. However, the teleosts have experienced their own whole genome duplication which produced many more genes. Unlike the amniotes which lost the original copy of their type I IFN, the teleost fish generally have two possible locations for their type I IFN, both corresponding to the ancestral location between SCN4A and ARHGAP27. The teleost interferons are:

- Type I
  - Group I (2 cysteines): IFNa, IFNd, IFNe
  - Group II (4 cysteines): IFNb, IFNc, IFNf
- Type II: IFNg (gamma), IFNgrel/IGNgl (gamma-related, gamma-like)
- Type III is not known to exist in teleosts as of 2011.
- Type IV: IFNu (upsilon)

Their receptors are (parenthesized are human ortholog-based nomenclature; there tends to be two because of the whole genome duplication, hence -1 and -2):

- CRFB1 (IFNAR2-1) + CRFB5 (IFNAR1) binds group I
- CRFB2 (IFNAR2-2) + CRFB5 (IFNAR1) binds group II
- CRFB6 (IFNGR2) + 2× CRFB13 (IFNGR1-2) binds IFNg
- CRFB6 (IFNGR2) + 2× CRFB17 (IFNGR1-1) binds IFNgrel
- CRFB6 (IFNGR2) + CRFB13 (IFNGR1-2) + CRFB17 (IFNGR1-1) binds IFNg and possibly IFNgrel
- CRFB12 (IFNUR1) + CRFB4 (IL-10R2) binds type IV

The split of type I into fish groups I, II and the many amniote Greek-letter groups happened independently, after the two groups of animals had diverged from each other. As a result, the only level of orthology between these grouping is that fish type I is as a whole orthologous to amniote type I. Much like in amniotes, the new copies of interferon have subfunctionalized in teleost fish.
