= Interferon type I =

Cytokine

Interferon Type I (α/β/δ...)
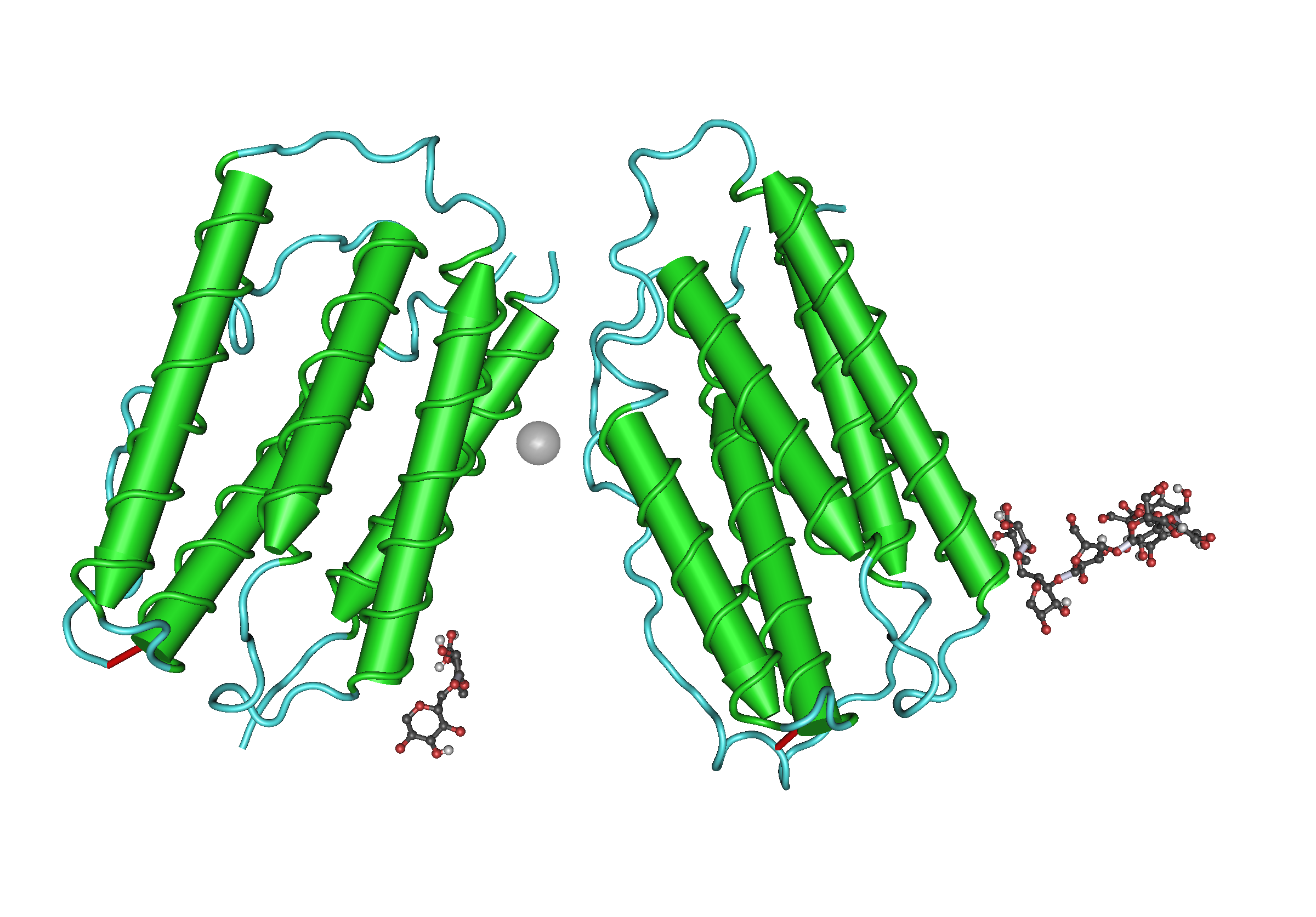
- The molecular structure of human interferon-beta (PDB: 1AU1).

Identifiers
- Symbol: Interferons
- Pfam: PF00143
- InterPro: IPR000471
- SMART: SM00076
- PROSITE: PDOC00225
- CATH: 1au1
- SCOP2: 1au1 / SCOPe / SUPFAM
- CDD: cd00095
Available protein structures:
- PDB: 1b5l :24-187 1ovi :24-185 2hie :24-186 1itf :24-186 1au1B:22-187 2hif :24-182 1wu3I:22-182 IPR000471 PF00143 (ECOD; PDBsum)
- AlphaFold: IPR000471; PF00143

The type-I interferons (IFN) are cytokines which play essential roles in inflammation, immunoregulation, tumor cells recognition, and T-cell responses. In the human genome, a cluster of thirteen functional IFN genes is located at the 9p21.3 cytoband over approximately 400 kb including coding genes for IFNα (IFNA1, IFNA2, IFNA4, IFNA5, IFNA6, IFNA7, IFNA8, IFNA10, IFNA13, IFNA14, IFNA16, IFNA17 and IFNA21), IFNω (IFNW1), IFNɛ (IFNE), IFNк (IFNK) and IFNβ (IFNB1), plus 11 IFN pseudogenes.

Interferons bind to interferon receptors. All type I IFNs bind to a specific cell surface receptor complex known as the IFN-α receptor (IFNAR) that consists of IFNAR1 and IFNAR2 chains.

Type I IFNs are found in all mammals, and homologous (similar) molecules have been found in birds, reptiles, amphibians and fish species.

== Sources and functions ==
IFN-α and IFN-β are secreted by many cell types including lymphocytes (NK cells, B-cells and T-cells), macrophages, fibroblasts, endothelial cells, osteoblasts and others. They stimulate both macrophages and NK cells to elicit an anti-viral response, involving IRF3/IRF7 antiviral pathways, and are also active against tumors. Plasmacytoid dendritic cells have been identified as being the most potent producers of type I IFNs in response to antigen, and have thus been coined natural IFN producing cells.

IFN-ω is released by leukocytes at the site of viral infection or tumors.

IFN-α acts as a pyrogenic factor by altering the activity of thermosensitive neurons in the hypothalamus thus causing fever. It does this by binding to opioid receptors and eliciting the release of prostaglandin-E_{2} (PGE_{2}).

A similar mechanism is used by IFN-α to reduce pain; IFN-α interacts with the μ-opioid receptor to act as an analgesic.

In mice, IFN-β inhibits immune cell production of growth factors, thereby slowing tumor growth, and inhibits other cells from producing vessel-producing growth factors, thereby blocking tumor angiogenesis and hindering the tumour from connecting into the blood vessel system.

In both mice and human, negative regulation of type I interferon signaling is known to be important. Few endogenous regulators have been found to elicit this important regulatory function, such as SOCS1 and aryl hydrocarbon receptor interacting protein (AIP).

== Mammalian types ==
The mammalian types are designated IFN-α (alpha), IFN-β (beta), IFN-κ (kappa), IFN-δ (delta), IFN-ε (epsilon), IFN-τ (tau), IFN-ω (omega), and IFN-ζ (zeta, also known as limitin). Of these types, IFN-α, IFN -ω, and IFN-τ can work across species.

=== IFN-α ===
The IFN-α proteins are produced mainly by plasmacytoid dendritic cells (pDCs). They are mainly involved in innate immunity against viral infection. The genes responsible for their synthesis come in 13 subtypes that are called IFNA1, IFNA2, IFNA4, IFNA5, IFNA6, IFNA7, IFNA8, IFNA10, IFNA13, IFNA14, IFNA16, IFNA17, IFNA21. These genes are found together in a cluster on chromosome 9. By comparison, in other species such as mice, mouse IFN-α genes were first isolated and characterized in 1982 by Shaw in the Weissmann lab at the University of Zurich. There are 14 mouse IFN-α genes and they are found in a cluster on chromosome 4.

IFN-α is also made synthetically as medication in hairy cell leukemia. The International Nonproprietary Name (INN) for the product is interferon alfa. The recombinant type is interferon alfacon-1. The pegylated types are pegylated interferon alfa-2a and pegylated interferon alfa-2b.

Recombinant feline interferon omega is a form of cat IFN-α (not ω) for veterinary use.

=== IFN-β ===
The IFN-β proteins are produced in large quantities by fibroblasts and play a key role in the innate immune response through their antiviral activity. Only one type of IFN-β, IFN-β1 (IFNB1), has been confirmed. A second gene, IFNB3, was reported, but this symbol was never adopted by the HUGO Gene Nomenclature Committee. A third gene once designated IFN-β2 was later identified as IL-6.

=== IFN-ε, -κ, -τ, -δ and -ζ ===
IFN-ε, -κ, -τ, and -ζ appear, at this time, to come in a single isoform in humans, IFNK. Only ruminants encode IFN-τ, a variant of IFN-ω. So far, IFN-ζ is only found in mice, while a structural homolog, IFN-δ is found in a diverse array of non-primate and non-rodent placental mammals. Most but not all placental mammals encode functional IFN-ε and IFN-κ genes..

=== IFN-ω ===
IFN-ω, although having only one functional form described to date (IFNW1), has several pseudogenes: IFNWP2, IFNWP4, IFNWP5, IFNWP9, IFNWP15, IFNWP18, and IFNWP19 in humans. Many non-primate placental mammals express multiple IFN-ω subtypes.

=== IFN-ν ===
This subtype of type I IFN was recently described as a pseudogene in human, but potentially functional in the domestic cat genome. In all other genomes of non-feline placental mammals, IFN-ν is a pseudogene; in some species, the pseudogene is well preserved, while in others, it is badly mutilated or is undetectable. Moreover, in the cat genome, the IFN-ν promoter is deleteriously mutated. It is likely that the IFN-ν gene family was rendered useless prior to mammalian diversification. Its presence on the edge of the type I IFN locus in mammals may have shielded it from obliteration, allowing its detection.

== In cancer ==
=== Therapeutics ===
From the 1980s onward, members of type-I IFN family have been the standard care as immunotherapeutic agents in cancer therapy. In particular, IFNα has been approved by the US Food and Drug Administration (FDA) for cancer. To date, pharmaceutical companies produce several types of recombinant and pegylated IFNα for clinical use; e.g., IFNα2a (Roferon-A, Roche), IFNα2b (Intron-A, Schering-Plough) and pegylated IFNα2b (Sylatron, Schering Corporation) for treatment of hairy cell leukemia, melanoma, renal cell carcinoma, Kaposi's sarcoma, multiple myeloma, follicular and non-Hodgkin lymphoma, and chronic myelogenous leukemia. Human IFNβ (Feron, Toray ltd.) has also been approved in Japan to treat glioblastoma, medulloblastoma, astrocytoma, and melanoma.

=== Copy number alteration of the interferon gene cluster in cancer ===
A large individual patient data meta-analysis using 9937 patients obtained from cBioportal indicates that copy number alteration of the IFN gene cluster is prevalent among 24 cancer types. Notably deletion of this cluster is significantly associated with increased mortality in many cancer types particularly uterus, kidney, and brain cancers. The Cancer Genome Atlas PanCancer analysis also showed that copy number alteration of the IFN gene cluster is significantly associated with decreased overall survival. For instance, the overall survival of patients with brain glioma reduced from 93 months (diploidy) to 24 months. In conclusion, the copy number alteration of the IFN gene cluster is associated with increased mortality and decreased overall survival in cancer.

== Use in therapeutics ==
=== In cancer ===
From the 1980s onward, members of type-I IFN family have been the standard care as immunotherapeutic agents in cancer therapy. In particular, IFNα has been approved by the US Food and Drug Administration (FDA) for cancer. To date, pharmaceutical companies produce several types of recombinant and Roferon-A, Roche), IFNα2b (Intron-A, Schering-Plough) and pegylated IFNα2b (Sylatron, Schering Corporation) for treatment of hairy cell leukemia, melanoma, renal cell carcinoma, Kaposi's sarcoma, multiple myeloma, follicular and non-Hodgkin lymphoma, and chronic myelogenous leukemia. Human IFNβ (Feron, Toray ltd.) has also been approved in Japan to treat glioblastoma, medulloblastoma, astrocytoma, and melanoma.

==== Combinational therapy with PD-1/PD-L1 inhibitors ====
By combining PD-1/PD-L1 inhibitors with type I interferons, researchers aim to tackle multiple resistance mechanisms and enhance the overall anti-tumor immune response. The approach is supported by preclinical and clinical studies that show promising synergistic effects, particularly in renal carcinoma. These studies reveal increased infiltration and activation of T cells within the tumor microenvironment, the development of memory T cells, and prolonged patient survival.

=== In viral infection ===
Due to their strong antiviral properties, recombinant type 1 IFNs can be used for the treatment for persistent viral infection. Pegylated IFN-α is the current standard of care when it comes to chronic Hepatitis B and C infection.

=== In multiple sclerosis ===
Currently, there are four FDA approved variants of IFN-β1 used as a treatment for relapsing multiple sclerosis. IFN-β1 is not an appropriate treatment for patients with progressive, non-relapsing forms of multiple sclerosis. Whilst the mechanism of action is not completely understood, the use of IFN-β1 has been found to reduce brain lesions, increase the expression of anti-inflammatory cytokines and reduce T cell infiltration into the brain.

=== Side effects ===
One of the major limiting factors in the efficacy of type I interferon therapy are the high rates of side effects. Between 15–40% of people undergoing type 1 IFN treatment develop major depressive disorders. Less commonly, interferon treatment has also been associated with anxiety, lethargy, psychosis and parkinsonism. Mood disorders associated with IFN therapy can be reversed by discontinuation of treatment, and IFN therapy-related depression is effectively treated with the selective serotonin reuptake inhibitor class of antidepressants.

== Interferonopathies ==
Interferonopathies are a class of hereditary auto-inflammatory and autoimmune diseases characterised by upregulated type 1 interferon and downstream interferon-stimulated genes. The symptoms of these diseases fall in a wide clinical spectrum, and often resemble those of viral infections acquired while the child is in utero, although lacking any infectious origin. The aetiology is largely still unknown, but the most common genetic mutations are associated with nucleic acid regulation, leading most researchers to suggest these arise from the failure of antiviral systems to differentiate between host and viral DNA and RNA.

== Non-mammalian types ==
Avian type I IFNs have been characterised and preliminarily assigned to subtypes (IFN I, IFN II, and IFN III), but their classification into subtypes should await a more extensive characterization of avian genomes.

Functional lizard type I IFNs can be found in lizard genome databases.

Turtle type I IFNs have been purified (references from 1970s needed). They resemble mammalian homologs.

The existence of amphibian type I IFNs have been inferred by the discovery of the genes encoding their receptor chains. They have not yet been purified, or their genes cloned.

Piscine (bony fish) type I IFN has been cloned first in zebrafish. and then in many other teleost species including salmon and mandarin fish. With few exceptions, and in stark contrast to avian and especially mammalian IFNs, they are present as single genes (multiple genes are however seen in polyploid fish genomes, possibly arising from whole-genome duplication). Unlike amniote IFN genes, piscine type I IFN genes contain introns, in similar positions as do their orthologs, certain interleukins. Despite this important difference, based on their 3-D structure these piscine IFNs have been assigned as type I IFNs. While in mammalian species all type I IFNs bind to a single receptor complex, the different groups of piscine type I IFNs bind to different receptor complexes. Several type I IFNs (IFNa, b, c, d, e, f and h) have been identified in teleost fish, with as low as only one subtype in green pufferfish and as many as six subtypes in salmon with an addition of recently identified novel subtype, IFNh, in mandarin fish.
