= Recombinant feline interferon omega =

Veterinary medication

Clinical data
- Trade names: Virbagen Omega, Intercat, Virbac
- ATCvet code: QL03AB90 (WHO)

Legal status
- Legal status: Approved in JP, AU/NZ, MX, CN

Identifiers
- CAS Number: 1253735-49-7

Interferon alpha "omega-like"

Identifiers
- Organism: Felis catus
- Symbol: IFNA7
- UniProt: P35849
Search for
- Structures: Swiss-model
- Domains: InterPro

Recombinant feline interferon omega (RFeIFN-ω), sold under the brand name Virbagen Omega among others, is a recombinant version of a cat interferon alpha. It is used to treat a range of viral diseases in cats and dogs, including canine parvovirus, feline leukemia virus (FeLV), and feline immunodeficiency virus (FIV) in many countries. It is approved to be used by injection under the skin. RFeIFN-ω is produced in silkworm larvae using a baculovirus vector.

Side effects include hyperthermia and decrease in white blood cell count. These effects tend to be mild and transient. It is a immunostimulant in the interferon family.

The feline interferon "omega" gene was first cloned in 1992. It was first produced in silkworms by Ueda and coworkers in 1993. The protein is around 60% identical to human alpha interferons, but the Ueda team deemed it an "omega-type" interferon due to some motifs. Phylogenic analysis in 2007 puts it as an alpha-type interferon. The correct name according to RefSeq is interferon, alpha 7 (IFNA7).

== Veterinary uses ==
RFeIFN-ω has been licensed in several countries to treat canine parvovirus, feline leukemia virus, and feline immunodeficiency virus infections. However, due to the expense and a time-consuming protocol of 15 total rounds of subcutaneous administration, its use remains limited. A limiting factor in its therapeutic use is the recombinant protein's short half-life, which can potentially be worked around with techniques such as PEGylation in future formulations.

== Research ==
RFeIFN-ω has also been used off-label to treat other viral infections. Studies have used IFN-ω to treat numerous diseases in felines and canines, however, further studies are needed with larger sample sizes and controlled groups to ensure the accuracy of results. In guinea pigs, it has been found to significantly reduce viral loads of the Influenza A virus subtype H1N1 upon daily treatment. In preclinical research, RFeIFN-ω has been found to decrease the viral load of Enterovirus E, infectious bovine rhinotracheitis virus, Bovine viral diarrhea, Indiana vesiculovirus, pseudorabies virus, European bat lyssavirus, influenza virus, feline calicivirus, and feline herpesvirus-1 (FHV-1). However, further studies are needed to reinforce these claims.

As the approved injection regimen is complicated and risky (feline injection site sarcoma), RFeIFN-ω has been experimentally used via other routes, including topical and oral protocols. RFeIFN-ω, delivered topically, is ineffective against feline upper respiratory tract disease caused by feline calicivirus.

Like other type I interferons, RFeIFN-ω has an effect against cancer cell cultures. There is also evidence of antitumor effects on human tumor xenografts in nude mice.

== Evolution ==
The smallest EggNOG orthogroup shared between FeIFN-ω (P35849) and human interferon omega (IFNW1) is H63FN, the common grouping of all type I interferons. This suggests that it is not a true interferon omega. Cats do have an interferon that is more closely related to IFNW' than FeIFN-ω according to EggNOG, ENSFCAP00000032900 ("32900"). This one would have diverged from IFNW1 some time between the divergence of Sarcopterygii (last common ancestor of 5QEEQ, the smallest orthogroup that includes both human IFNW1 and 32900) and the divergence of Euarchontoglires (last common ancestor of 4RYNE, the largest group that excludes 32900 and includes human IFNW1). Ensembl has since deleted this gene prediction, but BLASTP could be used to find that 32900 is near-identical to two proteins labelled IFNA5 (98.97%) and IFNA7 (99.48%, only one difference). However, IFNA7 (GenBank E02521, UniProt P35849) is the very protein that had been used in pharmacological products, suggesting that EggNOG analysis is simply incorrect.

IFNA7 and IFNA5 differ from typical IFNα by a common 5-residue insertion "IHPED". (Note: The insertion site is LTNED-----SIL → LTNEDIHPEDSIL. Alternative gap placement may yield "EDIHP", "DIHPE".) NCBI gene prediction indicates that a nearby LOC101081371 also translates to a protein with a similar sequence. Using IFNA7 as a BLASTP query against NCBI's nonredundant set of Carnivoran proteins reveals that analogous "VHPED" insertions exist in Prionailurus bengalensis at a predicted locus (LOC122474324) aligned to cat IFNA5 by the Comparative Genome viewer, and in Prionailurus viverrinus at a predicted locus (LOC125150421) aligned to cat IFNA8 by the CGV.

Yang et al. (2007) shows that cats have a group of 13 real interferon omegas with approximately 50% identity to the cat interferon alphas (including IFNA7).
