= IFNW1 =

Protein-coding gene in the species Homo sapiens

Identifiers
- Aliases: IFNW1, interferon omega 1
- External IDs: OMIM: 147553; GeneCards: IFNW1
Available structures
PDB	Human UniProt search: PDBe RCSB
PDB	List of PDB id codes 3SE4

Gene location (Human)
Chr.	Chromosome 9 (human)
Band	9p21.3	Start	21,140,632 bp
Band	9p21.3	End	21,141,832 bp
RNA expression pattern
Bgee	Human / Mouse (ortholog); Top expressed in: testicle; developmental structure; ganglionic eminence / n/a; More reference expression data
BioGPS	n/a
Gene ontology
Molecular function	cytokine activity; type I interferon receptor binding; cytokine receptor binding
Cellular component	extracellular region; extracellular space
Biological process	natural killer cell activation involved in immune response; B cell differentiation; defense response; B cell proliferation; response to virus; positive regulation of peptidyl-serine phosphorylation of STAT protein; humoral immune response; adaptive immune response; defense response to virus; response to exogenous dsRNA; cytokine-mediated signaling pathway; T cell activation involved in immune response; innate immune response; regulation of signaling receptor activity
Sources:Amigo / QuickGO
Orthologs
Databases	NCBI: entry; OMA: entry
Species	Human	Mouse
Entrez	3467	n/a
Ensembl	ENSG00000177047	n/a
UniProt	P05000	n/a
RefSeq (mRNA)	NM_002177	n/a
RefSeq (protein)	NP_002168	n/a
Location (UCSC)	Chr 9: 21.14 – 21.14 Mb	n/a
PubMed search		n/a
- Wikidata
View/Edit Human

Interferon omega-1 is a protein that is encoded by the IFNW1 gene.

Interferon omega-1 (IFN-ω) is a subtype of the Interferon type I family. The Interferon Type 1 family is made up of cytokines (proteins used in cell signaling) which bind to the cell surface receptor IFNAR. They are found in mammals and play roles in immunoregulation, inflammation, T-cell response, and tumor cell identification. Type 1 interferons have also been found in birds, lizards, and turtles. Multiple subvariants of IFN-ω have been observed in non-primate mammals with placentas. IFN-ω has been linked to antitumor activity and protection against bacterial and parasitic pathogens.

== Function ==
Through genome sequence analysis, it is thought that the IFN-ω gene diverged from the IFN-α gene roughly 130 million years ago. Interferon omega-1 serves as a cytokine that promotes innate immunity against viruses and cancers. It is involved with almost every nucleated cell.

There are sixteen subtypes of interferon type I. Despite having roughly 20%-60% sequence identity, the subtypes each act on IFNAR1 or IFNAR2 subunits of the class two helical cytokine receptor family. Specifically, IFN-ω shares 33% sequence similarity with IFN-β and 62% sequence similarity with IFN-α. The IFNAR1 subunit contains an intracellular domain that is linked to tyrosine kinase 2 and the IFNAR2 subunit contains an intracellular domain that is linked to Janus kinase 1. Once bound to these tyrosine kinases, a [phosphorylation] cascade will progress and is regulated by the STAT protein. Different responses result from the binding of each type I Interferon, and evidence points to the cause being conformational differences in ligand-receptor binding. The receptor can bind each type I Interferon in unique ways, creating respective downstream effects for each variant.

== Structure ==
Structure of the human IFNw-IFNAR ternary complex, PDB: 3SE4. IFNw is colored red and IFNAR is colored blue.

Limited IFN-ω structures are publicly available. There has been a structure of the IFNω-IFNAR ternary complex which has been solved to a resolution of 3.5 angstroms via X-ray crystallography. From this structure, the protein consists of four long and aligned alpha helices and one short alpha-helix connection. It is bound to both subunits simultaneously and with each active site being at opposite ends of the protein. In this structure, there is a small molecule of NAG bound to IFNAR1 on the opposite side of IFN-ω binding.

The Arg35 residue in IFN-ω binds to the IFNAR2 subunit and is conserved across most IFN type I subvariants. Leu32 of IFN-ω is another conserved residue in the hydrophobic cluster involved in IFNAR2 binding. The Val80 residue of IFNAR2 is key in discriminating between Type 1 Interferon subtypes and has a large effect on IFN-ω binding.

For binding with the IFNAR1 subunit, the residue Phe67 of IFN-ω has key hydrophobic and aromatic interactions with the Leu134 residue of IFNAR1. Additional hotspot residues include Arg123 of IFN-ω and Tyr70 or the IFNAR1 subunit. A salt bridge is formed between Lys152 and Glu149 of IFN-ω and in a small distance from Glu77 of IFNAR1. When bound to IFN-ω, the SD1 of IFNAR1 undergoes a major conformational change that is not seen when unbound or bound to IFN-α2.

== Clinical significance ==
A study reported a correlation between a decreased level of interferon type I proteins and more severe COVID-19 cases that are not associated with detectable autoantibodies against IFN-ω or IFN-α.

In combination with ribavirin, IFN-α has been used to treat chronic hepatitis C virus infections, however, this treatment option can carry extreme side effects. Evidence has emerged that IFN-ω could also serve as a potential treatment for HCV as it is more potent than IFN-α in repressing HCV RNA replicons.

Although limitations include time-consumption, necessary facilities, lack of specificity, and use of radioisotopes, RFeIFN-ω can be used in the detection of APS-1. Anti-IFN-ω antibodies are shown to develop before APS-1 symptoms show which allows for early detection of the virus. Methods of antibody detection include immunoassay, radioligand binding assay, and antiviral neutralization assays.

== Evolution ==
There is no single mouse or rat gene that is confidently known to correspond to (ortholog) IFNW1.

EggNOG indicates that the lineage of orthogroups leading up to IFNW1 is:

- 5IH8G, 71YJR, 7IZH3, HUF14, H63FN: orthogroups containing all type I interferons for all life, Eukaryota, Opisthokonta, Metazoa, Bilateria respectively.
- 93W7H (Gnathostomata): 9GBX1, sister of 9GBX1 that contains a family of genes greatly expanded in dogs (S1), sister of 9GBX1+S1 only retained in the Caninae (S2), sister of 9GBX1+S1+S2 found in Metatheria (S3), sister of 9GBX1+S1+S2+S3 found in the Sauropsida (S4), finally sister of 9GBX1+S1+S2+S3+S4 found in jawed fishes but not in any tetrapod.
- 9GBX1 (Eutheria): 8Z995 and a branch of interferons lost after the split of humans from the rest of the great apes (e.g. ENSPPAP00000005073).
- 8Z995 (Mammalia), 5QEEQ (Sarcopterygii): 4RYNE and the ruminant-specific interferon tau.
- 4RYNE (Euarchontoglires): 4ZKFY and orthologs in two rodents, the beavers (Castor) and guinea pigs (Cavia).
- 4ZKFY (Primata): From this point on there are no more gene duplications leading up to human IFNW1.

The parenthesized taxon indicates the last common ancestor of organisms that have a gene of this class. From 93W7H onwards, the only human gene that belongs to the lineage is IFNW1, so any of these nodes can be picked as the grouping of all "interferon omegas" as far as the human nomenclature is concerned. If excluding other named groups is a goal, then 4RYNE and 4ZKFY are both good choices.
