= Interferon alpha-1 =

Protein-coding gene in the species Homo sapiens

IFNA1

Identifiers
- Aliases: IFNA1, IFL, IFN, IFN-ALPHA, IFN-alphaD, IFNA13, IFNA@, Interferon, alpha 1, interferon alpha 1, leIF D
- External IDs: OMIM: 147660; GeneCards: IFNA1
Available structures
PDB	Human UniProt search: PDBe RCSB
PDB	List of PDB id codes 3UX9

Gene location (Human)
Chr.	Chromosome 9 (human)
Band	9p21.3	Start	21,440,439 bp
Band	9p21.3	End	21,441,316 bp
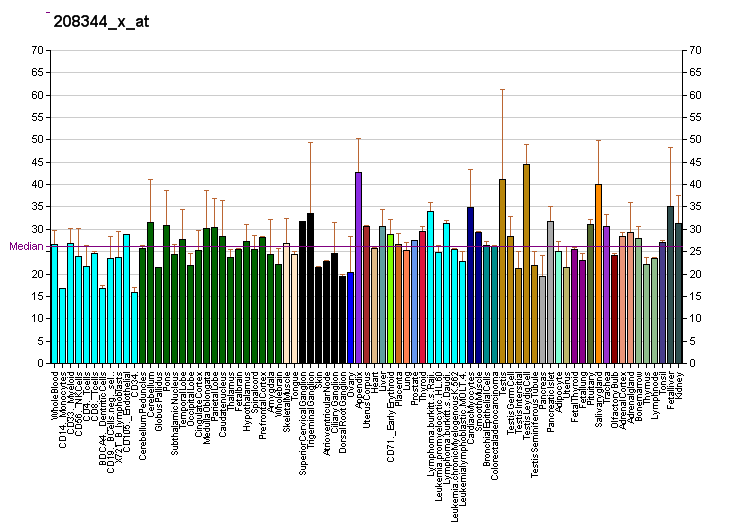

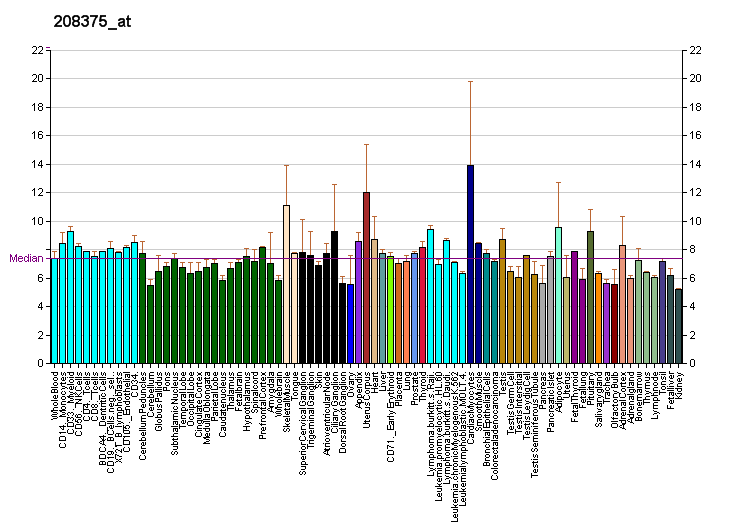
RNA expression pattern
Bgee	Human / Mouse (ortholog); Top expressed in: testicle; cerebellum; primary visual cortex; cerebellar hemisphere; right hemisphere of cerebellum; hippocampal formation; prefrontal cortex; hippocampus proper; Brodmann area 9; urinary bladder / n/a; More reference expression data
BioGPS	More reference expression data
Gene ontology
Molecular function	cytokine activity; type I interferon receptor binding; cytokine receptor binding
Cellular component	extracellular region; extracellular space
Biological process	natural killer cell activation involved in immune response; B cell differentiation; defense response; B cell proliferation; blood coagulation; positive regulation of peptidyl-serine phosphorylation of STAT protein; humoral immune response; adaptive immune response; defense response to virus; type I interferon signaling pathway; response to exogenous dsRNA; T cell activation involved in immune response; cytokine-mediated signaling pathway; innate immune response; regulation of signaling receptor activity
Sources:Amigo / QuickGO
Orthologs
Databases	NCBI: entry; OMA: entry
Species	Human	Mouse
Entrez	3439	n/a
Ensembl	ENSG00000197919	n/a
UniProt	P01562	n/a
RefSeq (mRNA)	NM_024013	n/a
RefSeq (protein)	NP_076918	n/a
Location (UCSC)	Chr 9: 21.44 – 21.44 Mb	n/a
PubMed search		n/a
- Wikidata
View/Edit Human

Interferon alpha-1 is a protein that in humans is encoded by the IFNA1 gene.

Leukocyte interferon is produced predominantly by B lymphocytes. Immune interferon (IFN-gamma; MIM 147570) is produced by mitogen- or antigen-stimulated T lymphocytes.[supplied by OMIM]

== The type I interferon gene family ==
The interferons (IFN)s are a family of cytokines with potent antiviral, antiproliferative and immunomodulatory properties. IFNs were originally discovered as molecules that could reduce the ability of a normal virus to infect cells, a process called viral 'interference'. IFNs have been classified into two major types of IFNs, type I and type II, based on their interactions to a specific cell surface receptor. In recent years, a novel class of cytokines with IFN-like activities has been described and designated as type III IFNs (IFN-λ1-3). In humans, there are 13 different IFN-alpha genes, designated as IFN-α1, -α2, - α4, - α5, - α6, - α7, - α8, - α10, - α13, - α14, - α16, - α17 and - α21, and one each of the IFN beta (IFNB), IFN-Epsilon, IFN-Kappa and IFN-Omega genes. The human IFNA gene family shares 70-80% amino acid sequence homology, and about 35% identity with IFNB. The high degree of amino-acid sequence similarity within the IFNA genes suggests a common ancestor gene. It seems likely that the IFNA gene cluster has been generated by gene conversion or recent duplication events. There are 12 functional human IFNA gene products. All of these IFN-α proteins exhibit high homology in their primary, secondary, and tertiary structures. IFNA and IFNB are produced by a wide range of cells such as macrophages, fibroblasts and endothelial cells, but plasmacytoid dendritic cells (pDCs) are considered the main producers of IFNA in response to RNA or DNA viruses or nucleic acid-containing immune complexes.

== Type I IFN Signaling ==
The type I IFNs bind to the interferon alpha receptor (IFNAR), which consists of two subunits, IFNAR1 (α-subunit) and IFNAR2 (β-subunit). Two cytoplasmic tyrosine kinases provide downstream signaling after type I IFN binds to the IFNAR receptor, Janus kinase 1 (JAK1) and tyrosine kinase 2 (TYK2). The biological effects of IFNs are mediated through the Janus kinase/signal transducer and activator of transcription (JAK/STAT) pathway. STAT1 and STAT2 are activated by these tyrosine kinases, and STAT1 and STAT2 mediate the antiviral and inflammatory effects of IFN-α/IFN-β. STAT1 and STAT2 form a complex with IFN-regulatory factor 9 (IRF) forming the transcription factor complex ISGF3, which then translocates to the nucleus and binds to IFN-stimulated response elements (ISREs) in the promoters of IFN-regulated genes (IRGs). In addition, canonical type I IFN signalling may activate STAT1 homodimers that bind to interferon-gamma-activating factor (GAF), which also translocates to the nucleus and activates transcription of IFN-stimulated genes.

== Inducers of type I IFN ==
The virus-induced expression of IFNA/IFNB genes is primarily controlled at the gene transcription level, by the interferon regulatory factors (IRFs) and IFN-stimulated genes. Viruses and immune complexes (ICs) containing nucleic acids can access intracellular TLRs (TLR3, TLR7/8 and TLR9) after binding to Fc receptors and induce IFN-α production by activation of the IRFs. Signaling through TLRs can broadly be categorized into two pathways the MyD88 and the Trip-dependent pathway. All TLRs except TLR3 signal through the MyD88-dependent pathway. Only TLR3 and TLR4 signal through the TRIF-dependent pathway. The MyD88-dependent pathway recruits several effector molecules such as IRAK1/4 and tumor necrosis factor receptor-associated factor 6 (TRAF6). These molecules are linked to at least three major downstream pathways: the NF-κB pathway, the pathway involving mitogen-activated protein kinases (MAPKs) and IRF pathways, depending on the stimulus and the responding cell types activation of these pathways results in transcription of various cytokines including IFN-α/β. Signaling via cytosolic viral sensors can also activate similar pathways and result in transcription of IFN-α/β.

== Disease relevance ==
Emerging evidence suggests that abnormal IFN production contributes to immune dysfunction and mediates tissue inflammation and organ damage in a number of autoimmune diseases such as systemic lupus erythematosus (SLE), rheumatoid arthritis (RA), idiopathic inflammatory myopathies (IIM), Sjogren's syndrome (SS) and multiple sclerosis (MS). Increased serum IFN-α and IFN-α-induced gene expression are frequently observed in patients with SLE, and many of SLE clinical manifestations such as fever, fatigue and leukopenia are similar to those observed in patients with influenza or as a side effect of IFN-therapy, suggesting that type I IFNs are important in the molecular pathogenesis of SLE. A heritable pattern of high circulating type I IFN has been observed in SLE families, suggesting that high IFN is a heritable risk factor for SLE. Furthermore, patients with non-autoimmune diseases treated with IFN-α can develop a “lupus-like” syndrome, including antinuclear antibodies (ANA) and anti-double stranded DNA (ds-DNA) which usually resolve after IFN-α therapy discontinuation. As noted above, IRFs are proteins which regulate transcription of IFNs. Genetic variations in the IRF genes have been associated with risk of developing SLE, and these genetic variations have also been linked to increased IFN-α production and with SLE-associated autoantibody formation. Several observations suggest that type I IFN is involved in the pathogenesis of inflammatory myopathies. Patients with dermatomyositis and polymyositis have increased IFN serum levels which in some studies correlate with disease activity or myositis-specific autoantibodies. Also, studies have suggested a genetic or heritable component to the high type I IFN observed in myositis patients, similar to SLE. Multiple sclerosis (MS) is a disorder of the central nervous system characterized by inflammation, demyelination and neurodegeneration with presumed autoimmune origin. Whereas type I IFNs are thought to induce some autoimmune conditions such as SLE as noted above, MS is effectively treated by administering recombinant human IFN-β. MS patients have lower levels of circulating type I interferon compared to patients with other autoimmune diseases. However, a number of patients with relapsing-remitting MS have a high IFN signature as well as more clinical and MRI attacks before therapy and these patients often do not response to IFN-β therapy. Neuromyelitis optica, another autoimmune disorder similar to MS which does not respond to IFN therapy, is associated with higher baseline circulating IFN levels.

== Current and future therapeutic options ==
Several IFN-blocking strategies are currently being evaluated in clinical trials. For instance, a phase I clinical trial of the anti-IFN-α monoclonal antibody MEDI-545 in SLE patients suggested possible disease activity improvement in SLE patients. Another phase I clinical trial has reported a dose-dependent inhibition of IFN-α/β-inducible genes in both peripheral blood and skin biopsies in SLE patients treated with anti-IFN monoclonal antibody therapy. Also, some studies suggest that type I IFN in circulation may be useful to predict response to immunotherapy in RA.
