= Interferon alfa =

Pharmaceutical drug

Clinical data
- AHFS/Drugs.com: International Drug Names
- Routes of administration: Subcutaneous, intramuscular
- ATC code: L03AB01 (WHO)

Identifiers
- DrugBank: DB05258
- ChemSpider: none

Interferon alfa (INN) or HuIFN-alpha-Le, trade name Multiferon, is a pharmaceutical drug composed of natural interferon alpha (IFN-α), obtained from the leukocyte fraction of human blood following induction with Sendai virus. Interferon alfa contains several naturally occurring IFN-α subtypes and is purified by affinity chromatography. Although the pharmaceutical product is often simply called "interferon alpha" or "IFN-α" like its endogenous counterpart, the product's International nonproprietary name (INN) is interferon alfa (the spelling of 'alfa' with 'f' reflects INN naming conventions).

Interferon alfa is used in a variety of treatments, including certain forms of leukemia, melanoma, non-Hodgkin's lymphoma, hepatitis B, and hepatitis C. It is typically administered as an injection under the skin.

== Adverse Effects ==
Common side effects (≥10% of people) include: increased risk of infection due to drop in white blood cells; difficulty sleeping; mood changes including irritability, excitement, restlessness, or depression; headaches and dizziness; dry mouth; blurred vision; feeling or being sick; abdominal pain; diarrhoea; sore mouth; taste changes; hair loss; sweating; joint and/or muscle pain; injection site reactions, fatigue, flu-like symptoms; loss of appetite and weight loss.

The US FDA has issued a black box warning regarding the potential for "caus[ing] or aggravat[ing] fatal or life-threatening neuropsychiatric, autoimmune, ischemic, and infectious disorders."

== Composition ==
Interferon alfa contains a mixture of several proteins, all with structural, serological, and functional properties typical for natural interferon alpha (IFN-α). The major subtypes identified are IFN-α1, IFN-α2, IFN-α8, IFN-α10, IFN-α14 and IFN-α21. Of these, IFN-α2 and IFN-α14 are glycosylated. The IFN-α content is expressed in International Units per milliliter, and the drug product is formulated in isotonic phosphate buffer solution at pH = 7.2, and supplemented with human albumin at 1.5 mg/mL. The albumin used is a medicinal product approved in several countries, and is indicated for subcutaneous injection therapy.

== Pharmacology ==
IFN-α8 enhances the proliferation of human B cells, as well as being able to activate NK cells. The subtypes α10 and α2, along with α8, are the most efficient and powerful NK cell activators. Subtypes α21 and α2 enhance the expression of IFN-gamma-inducible protein-10 (IP-10) in dendritic cells. Activated dendritic cells initiate immune responses and induce the expression of IP-10, a chemokine which promotes a Th1 inflammatory response.

IFN-α1 causes increased HLA-II expression, and can directly inhibit tumor cell growth in vitro. However, it is a poor activator of NK cells, has relatively little antiviral activity, does not induce B cell proliferation, and does not enhance HLA-I or tumor antigen expression. Despite its apparent inactivity, it is still used clinically in the treatment of metastatic renal cell carcinoma, with a reported lower toxicity than the recombinant IFN-α2. Overall, IFN-α has a general inflammatory action which skews the immune response towards a Th1 profile.

Subtype α2 increases the expression of HLA-I molecules, which correlates with IFN-α-mediated activation of memory CD8 cells and increased cytolytic action against virally infected cells and tumor cells (via cytotoxic CD8 cells).
