= ARHGAP27 =

Protein-coding gene in the species Homo sapiens

Identifiers
- Aliases: ARHGAP27, CAMGAP1, PP905, SH3D20, SH3P20, Rho GTPase activating protein 27
- External IDs: OMIM: 610591; MGI: 1916903; GeneCards: ARHGAP27
Available structures
PDB	Ortholog search: PDBe RCSB
PDB	List of PDB id codes 3PP2

Gene location (Human)
Chr.	Chromosome 17 (human)
Band	17q21.31	Start	45,393,902 bp
Band	17q21.31	End	45,434,421 bp

Gene location (Mouse)
Chr.	Chromosome 11 (mouse)
Band	11|11 E1	Start	103,222,323 bp
Band	11|11 E1	End	103,254,518 bp
RNA expression pattern
Bgee	Human / Mouse (ortholog); Top expressed in: granulocyte; blood; monocyte; mucosa of transverse colon; spleen; duodenum; appendix; minor salivary glands; vagina; upper lobe of left lung / Top expressed in: granulocyte; pyloric antrum; otic vesicle; esophagus; right kidney; gastric mucosa; yolk sac; epithelium of stomach; lip; fibula; More reference expression data
BioGPS	n/a
Gene ontology
Molecular function	SH3 domain binding; GTPase activator activity
Cellular component	intracellular anatomical structure; membrane; nucleus; nucleoplasm; cytoplasm; cytosol
Biological process	endocytosis; signal transduction; positive regulation of GTPase activity; receptor-mediated endocytosis; regulation of GTPase activity
Sources:Amigo / QuickGO
Orthologs
Databases	NCBI: entry; OMA: entry
Species	Human	Mouse
Entrez	201176	544817
Ensembl	ENSG00000159314; ENSG00000276836; ENSG00000276907	ENSMUSG00000034255
UniProt	Q6ZUM4; Q8N2Y9	A2AB59
RefSeq (mRNA)	NM_001159330; NM_001282290; NM_174919; NM_199282	NM_001205236; NM_133715; NM_183288
RefSeq (protein)	NP_001269219; NP_777579; NP_954976; NP_954976.1	NP_001192165; NP_598476; NP_899111
Location (UCSC)	Chr 17: 45.39 – 45.43 Mb	Chr 11: 103.22 – 103.25 Mb
PubMed search
- Wikidata
View/Edit Human	View/Edit Mouse

Rho GTPase activating protein 27 is a protein that in humans is encoded by the ARHGAP27 gene.

== Function ==
This gene encodes a member of a large family of proteins that activate Rho-type guanosine triphosphate (GTP) metabolizing enzymes. The encoded protein may play a role in clathrin-mediated endocytosis. Alternatively spliced transcript variants encoding multiple isoforms have been observed for this gene. [provided by RefSeq, Aug 2013].
