= IFNA5 =

Protein-coding gene in the species Homo sapiens

Identifiers
- Aliases: IFNA5, IFN-alpha-5, IFN-alphaG, INA5, INFA5, leIF G, interferon alpha 5
- External IDs: OMIM: 147565; MGI: 2667155; GeneCards: IFNA5
Available structures
PDB	Ortholog search: PDBe RCSB
PDB	List of PDB id codes 3OQ3

Gene location (Human)
Chr.	Chromosome 9 (human)
Band	9p21.3	Start	21,304,326 bp
Band	9p21.3	End	21,305,313 bp

Gene location (Mouse)
Chr.	Chromosome 4 (mouse)
Band	4 C4|4 42.02 cM	Start	88,561,878 bp
Band	4 C4|4 42.02 cM	End	88,562,696 bp
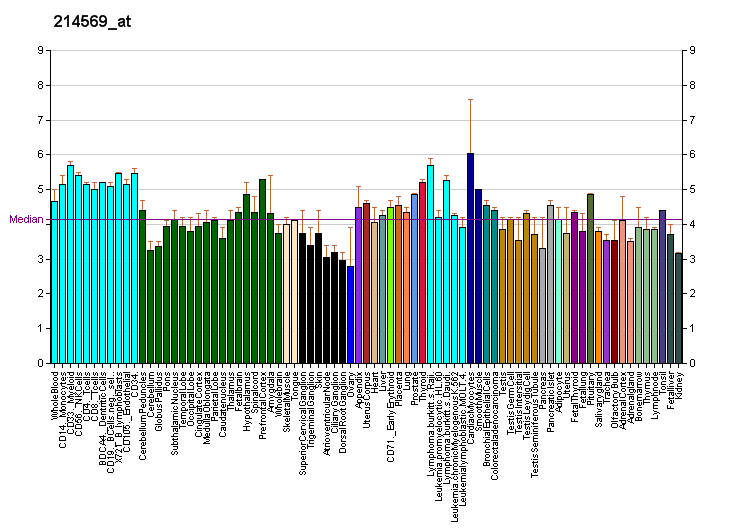
RNA expression pattern
Bgee	Human / Mouse (ortholog); Top expressed in: mucosa of ileum; Achilles tendon; sural nerve; stromal cell of endometrium; right coronary artery; right lung; gastric mucosa; right adrenal cortex; popliteal artery; tibial arteries / Top expressed in: embryo; embryo; More reference expression data
BioGPS	More reference expression data
Gene ontology
Molecular function	cytokine activity; type I interferon receptor binding; cytokine receptor binding
Cellular component	extracellular region; extracellular space
Biological process	natural killer cell activation involved in immune response; B cell differentiation; defense response; B cell proliferation; blood coagulation; positive regulation of peptidyl-serine phosphorylation of STAT protein; humoral immune response; adaptive immune response; defense response to virus; type I interferon signaling pathway; response to exogenous dsRNA; T cell activation involved in immune response; innate immune response; cytokine-mediated signaling pathway; regulation of signaling receptor activity
Sources:Amigo / QuickGO
Orthologs
Databases	NCBI: entry; OMA: entry
Species	Human	Mouse
Entrez	3442	230396
Ensembl	ENSG00000147873	ENSMUSG00000063376
UniProt	P01569	Q80SU4
RefSeq (mRNA)	NM_002169	NM_177347
RefSeq (protein)	NP_002160	NP_796321
Location (UCSC)	Chr 9: 21.3 – 21.31 Mb	Chr 4: 88.56 – 88.56 Mb
PubMed search
- Wikidata
View/Edit Human	View/Edit Mouse

Interferon alpha-5 is a protein that in humans is encoded by the IFNA5 gene.
