= EggNOG (database) =

eggNOG

Content
- Description: Database of orthologous proteins and functional annotations at multiple taxonomical levels.

Contact
- Research center: European Molecular Biology Laboratory
- Authors: Huerta-Cepas et al.
- Primary citation: Huerta-Cepas et al. (2015)
- Release date: 2015

Access
- Website: http://eggnogdb.embl.de

The eggNOG database is a database of biological information hosted by the EMBL. It is based on the original idea of COGs (clusters of orthologous groups) and expands that idea to non-supervised orthologous groups constructed from numerous organisms. The database was created in 2007 and updated to version 4.5 in 2015. eggNOG stands for evolutionary genealogy of genes: Non-supervised Orthologous Groups.
