= IFNK =

Protein-coding gene

Identifiers
- Aliases: IFNK, IFNT1, INFE1, interferon kappa
- External IDs: OMIM: 615326; MGI: 2683287; GeneCards: IFNK

Gene location (Human)
Chr.	Chromosome 9 (human)
Band	9p21.2	Start	27,524,290 bp
Band	9p21.2	End	27,526,498 bp

Gene location (Mouse)
Chr.	Chromosome 4 (mouse)
Band	4|4 A5	Start	35,152,056 bp
Band	4|4 A5	End	35,154,005 bp
RNA expression pattern
Bgee	Human / Mouse (ortholog); Top expressed in: testicle; Achilles tendon; corpus callosum; epithelium of colon; monocyte; skeletal muscle tissue; blood; muscle of thigh; cervix; respiratory system / Top expressed in: blastocyst; embryo; morula; placenta; tail of embryo; yolk sac; uterus; liver; stomach; genital tubercle; More reference expression data
BioGPS	n/a
Gene ontology
Molecular function	cytokine activity; type I interferon receptor binding; cytokine receptor binding
Cellular component	extracellular region; extracellular space
Biological process	natural killer cell activation involved in immune response; B cell differentiation; defense response; response to virus; natural killer cell activation; B cell proliferation; regulation of transcription, DNA-templated; humoral immune response; adaptive immune response; positive regulation of peptidyl-serine phosphorylation of STAT protein; defense response to virus; response to exogenous dsRNA; negative regulation of cell population proliferation; cytokine-mediated signaling pathway; positive regulation of innate immune response; T cell activation involved in immune response; regulation of signaling receptor activity
Sources:Amigo / QuickGO
Orthologs
Databases	NCBI: entry; OMA: entry
Species	Human	Mouse
Entrez	56832	387510
Ensembl	ENSG00000147896	ENSMUSG00000042993
UniProt	Q9P0W0	Q7TSL0
RefSeq (mRNA)	NM_020124	NM_199157
RefSeq (protein)	NP_064509	NP_954608
Location (UCSC)	Chr 9: 27.52 – 27.53 Mb	Chr 4: 35.15 – 35.15 Mb
PubMed search
- Wikidata
View/Edit Human	View/Edit Mouse

Interferon kappa or IFN-kappa is a protein that in humans is encoded by the IFNK gene. Through different clinical studies, Interferon kappa has been assumed to play a role in controlling immune cell activity. It has been determined that this is a cytokine that gives cells species-specific resistance against viral infection. Interferon-stimulated response element signaling has also been hypothesized to be induced. This is because it has the ability to directly regulate the release of cytokines by monocytes and dendritic cells. It has also been discovered to bind heparin.

== Protein family ==
IFN-kappa belongs to the family of type I interferons. IFN-α, IFN-β, IFN-ε, IFN-κ, and IFN-ω are among the many cytokine subtypes that comprise the type I interferon family. A family of homologous glycoproteins known as type I interferons aids in the host's defense against viruses.

IFN-κ and IFN-ε are members of an exclusive subgroup of the type I interferon family, according to phylogenetic analysis. This is predicated on particular functional and genetic traits that distinguish IFN-κ and IFN-ε from the other type I IFNs. Crucially, IFN-κ is highly conserved in a variety of mammalian species, including mice and humans, which attests to its importance in evolution as will be expanded in sections below.

Also, the gene is on chromosome 9, close to the type I interferon cluster.

== Evolution and phylogeny ==
Interferon kappa (IFN-κ), a type I interferon, evolved in vertebrates as a component of the innate immune system's early reaction to viral infections. IFN-κ is a unique sublineage of the type I interferon family that differs from more widely expressed members like IFN-α and IFN-β, according to phylogenetic analyses. The human IFNK gene is found on chromosome 9 in the type I interferon gene cluster. According to comparative genomic studies, IFN-κ is conserved in a variety of placental mammals, such as ungulates, rodents, and primates, indicating that it first appeared early in the evolution of mammals. IFN-κ exhibits a very limited expression pattern in contrast to other type I interferons, especially in epithelial tissues like the skin. Its distinct distribution and evolutionary conservation emphasize its specialized function in epithelial immunity, especially at barrier surfaces such as the epidermis. The ways in which this specialization influences IFN-κ's role in host defense are still being investigated in comparative and functional studies.

== Interactions ==
By attaching itself to the heterodimeric type I interferon receptor (IFNAR), which is made up of the IFNAR1 and IFNAR2 subunits, IFN-κ carries out its biological actions. The Janus kinase-signal transducer and activator of transcription (JAK-STAT) signaling pathway is triggered by this interaction. Key tyrosine residues on the intracellular domains of the receptor are phosphorylated by the associated kinases JAK1 (in combination with IFNAR2) and TYK2 (in combination with IFNAR1) upon receptor engagement. STAT1 and STAT2 dock at these phosphorylation sites, phosphorylate, dimerize, and attach to interferon regulatory factor 9 (IRF9) to form the interferon-stimulated gene factor 3 (ISGF3) complex. After moving into the nucleus, ISGF3 attaches itself to interferon-stimulated response elements (ISREs) and triggers the transcription of interferon-stimulated genes (ISGs).

IFN-κ has been demonstrated to affect secondary signaling cascades like the MAPK and PI3K/AKT pathways in addition to the canonical JAK-STAT pathway. IFN-κ can control a wider range of immune mediators, including pro-inflammatory cytokines like TNF-α and IL-6, thanks to these alternate pathways. This implies that IFN-κ signaling and larger inflammatory networks may interact. Numerous IFN-κ interaction partners, such as members of the STAT family, IRFs, and other intracellular adaptors involved in immune and antiviral responses, have been identified by bioinformatics databases like BioGRID and STRING. Nevertheless, compared to other type I interferons, its interactome is still poorly understood, showing the necessity for additional experimental verification.

== Structure ==
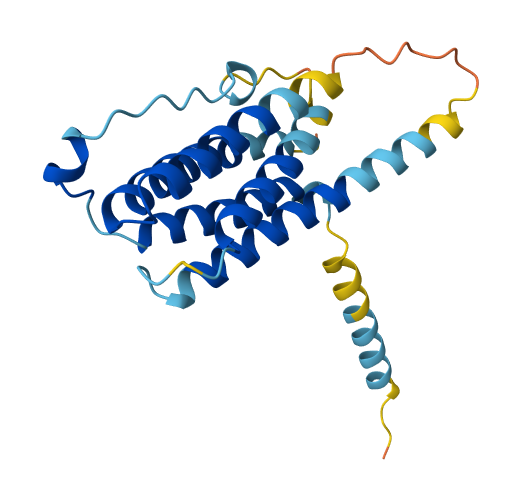
Predicted 3D structure of interferon kappa (IFN-κ), rendered using AlphaFold. Based on UniProt ID: Q9P0W0.

Keratinocytes, the main epidermal cells, are the primary source of interferon kappa (IFN-κ), a type I interferon. IFN-κ can interact with IFNAR and start downstream signaling because it shares the characteristic alpha-helical fold of type I interferons. It is believed to be essential for localized epithelial immunity and is primarily produced by keratinocytes, the predominant cell type in the epidermis. The ability of IFN-κ to bind IFNAR with high specificity is supported by its predicted 3D structure, which was created using AlphaFold and based on UniProt ID Q9P0W0.

After receptor engagement, JAK1 and TYK2 phosphorylate IFNAR subunits, recruit and activate STAT1 and STAT2, and form the ISGF3 complex, which is the next step in IFN-κ signaling. This complex triggers ISGs that control apoptosis, stimulate antiviral responses, and alter immune function after it has been translocated into the nucleus. IFN-κ has a broader effect on cell proliferation, migration, and immune regulation because it can also activate PI3K and MAPK signaling cascades in addition to the JAK-STAT pathway.

Since aberrant regulation of its signaling has been linked to autoimmune diseases, chronic inflammation, and skin disorders, it is imperative to comprehend the structural and functional characteristics of IFN-κ. Modifying epithelial immune responses in disease may be possible through the use of novel therapeutic approaches that target its receptor interactions or downstream pathways.

== Clinical relevance ==
An increasing number of human diseases have been linked to altered IFN-κ expression or function. Systemic lupus erythematosus (SLE), an autoimmune disease marked by dysregulated type I interferon signaling, and has been linked to decreased IFN-κ activity. According to studies, polymorphisms close to the IFNK gene locus may change the balance between interferon production and immune regulation, which therefore influencing susceptibility to SLE.

Furthermore, IFN-κ is increasingly recognized in dermatology as a major contributor to inflammatory skin conditions like psoriasis. The hallmark of psoriasis is persistent, immune-mediated skin inflammation, which is fueled by intricate relationships between immune cells and keratinocytes. Prolonged inflammation and pathological tissue remodeling are caused by immune response dysregulation, specifically the overactivation of type I interferon signaling pathways. Continually expressed in keratinocytes, IFN-κ can be aberrantly upregulated in psoriatic lesions, where it functions as an amplifier and initiator of local immune responses. Pro-inflammatory cytokines and chemokines, like CXCL10 and CCL20, are produced in greater quantities when IFN-κ is over-expressed. These cytokines and chemokines attract and activate Th1 and Th17 immune cells, thereby intensifying inflammation. Furthermore, IFN-κ signaling increases the expression of interferon-stimulated genes (ISGs) involved in cell cycle progression and stress responses, which in turn promotes keratinocyte hyper-proliferation, a characteristic of psoriatic plaques.

Perhaps the most well-established connection between IFN-κ dysregulation and human papillomavirus infections (HPV) is the clinical association. The IFNK gene is epigenetically suppressed in cervical keratinocytes infected with HPV, especially high-risk oncogenic strains like HPV-16 and HPV-18. DNA methylation of CpG islands in the IFNK promoter region is the main mechanism causing this silencing, which results in decreased transcriptional activity. The epithelial antiviral defense system is weakened as a result of the marked decrease in local IFN-κ production. Without IFN-κ signaling, HPV can continue to exist without being recognized by the immune system, which promotes viral replication, immune evasion, and the development of cervical intraepithelial neoplasia and ultimately carcinoma.

Notably, the Rincon-Orozco et al. (2009) study showed that IFN-κ expression could be restored by treating HPV-positive cervical cell lines with demethylating agents like 5-aza-2'-deoxycytidine. IFN-κ reactivation may be a useful therapeutic approach to counteract HPV-driven oncogenesis because it increased the activation of interferon-stimulated genes (ISGs) and improved antiviral responses.B. Rincon-Orozco et al. (2009). Interferon-kappa is epigenetically silenced in cells infected with human papillomavirus type 16.

Additionally, the role of IFN-κ in skin cancers like basal cell carcinoma and cutaneous squamous cell carcinoma is being studied currently. Early tumor formation may be prevented by its capacity to promote local immune surveillance in epithelial tissues. However, in some situations, chronic IFN-κ signaling may also be a factor in autoimmunity or inflammation that promotes tumor growth.

Overall, therapeutically targeting the IFN-κ axis is a promising and increasingly researched approach for the treatment of chronic viral infections, autoimmune diseases, and cancers derived from epithelial cells. IFN-κ provides a distinct therapeutic window that other type I interferons do not take advantage of because of its specialized expression in keratinocytes and its dual functions in immune regulation and antiviral immunity. The use of recombinant IFN-κ proteins to restore protective signaling in IFN-κ-deficient tissues, small molecule mimetics that mimic its immunomodulatory effects, and epigenetic therapies intended to reverse IFN-κ silencing in virally transformed or dysregulated epithelial cells are some of the various methods investigators are currently investigating to modulate IFN-κ activity. These tactics seek to improve antiviral defense, suppress unwarranted inflammation, and rebalance local immune responses without inciting systemic immune activation.
