= IFNA8 =

Protein-coding gene in the species Homo sapiens

Identifiers
- Aliases: IFNA8, IFN-alphaB, interferon alpha 8
- External IDs: OMIM: 147568; MGI: 2667155; GeneCards: IFNA8

Gene location (Human)
Chr.	Chromosome 9 (human)
Band	9p21.3	Start	21,409,117 bp
Band	9p21.3	End	21,410,185 bp

Gene location (Mouse)
Chr.	Chromosome 4 (mouse)
Band	4 C4|4 42.02 cM	Start	88,561,878 bp
Band	4 C4|4 42.02 cM	End	88,562,696 bp
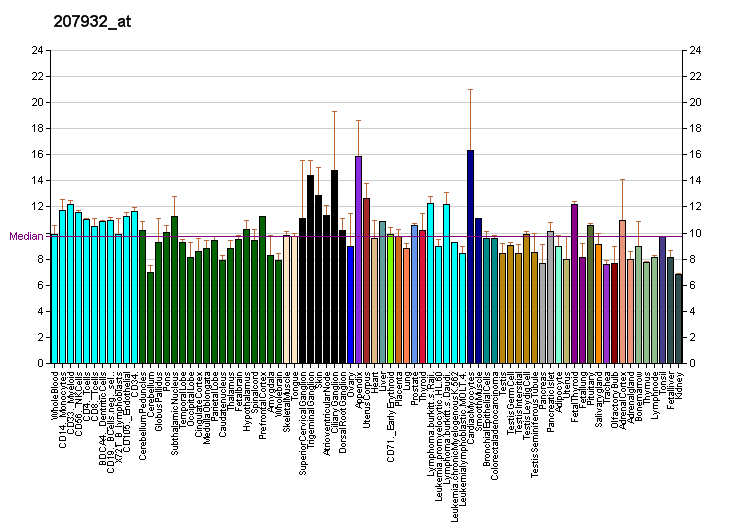
RNA expression pattern
Bgee	Human / Mouse (ortholog); Top expressed in: cerebellar cortex; cerebellar hemisphere; right hemisphere of cerebellum; primary visual cortex; prefrontal cortex / Top expressed in: embryo; embryo; More reference expression data
BioGPS	More reference expression data
Gene ontology
Molecular function	cytokine activity; type I interferon receptor binding; cytokine receptor binding
Cellular component	extracellular region; extracellular space
Biological process	natural killer cell activation involved in immune response; B cell differentiation; defense response; B cell proliferation; blood coagulation; positive regulation of peptidyl-serine phosphorylation of STAT protein; humoral immune response; adaptive immune response; defense response to virus; type I interferon signaling pathway; response to exogenous dsRNA; T cell activation involved in immune response; innate immune response; cytokine-mediated signaling pathway; regulation of signaling receptor activity
Sources:Amigo / QuickGO
Orthologs
Databases	NCBI: entry; OMA: entry
Species	Human	Mouse
Entrez	3445	230396
Ensembl	ENSG00000120242	ENSMUSG00000063376
UniProt	P32881	Q80SU4
RefSeq (mRNA)	NM_002170	NM_177347
RefSeq (protein)	NP_002161	NP_796321
Location (UCSC)	Chr 9: 21.41 – 21.41 Mb	Chr 4: 88.56 – 88.56 Mb
PubMed search
- Wikidata
View/Edit Human	View/Edit Mouse

Interferon alpha-8 is a protein that in humans is encoded by the IFNA8 gene.
