= IFNB1 =

Protein-coding gene in the species Homo sapiens

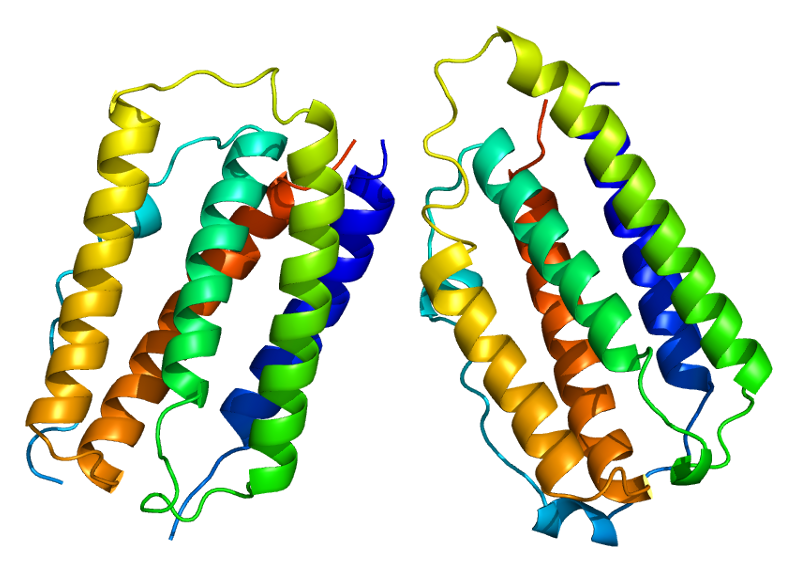

Identifiers
- Aliases: IFNB1, IFB, IFF, IFNB, IFN-beta, interferon beta 1
- External IDs: OMIM: 147640; MGI: 107657; GeneCards: IFNB1
Available structures
PDB	Ortholog search: PDBe RCSB
PDB	List of PDB id codes 1AU1

Gene location (Human)
Chr.	Chromosome 9 (human)
Band	9p21.3	Start	21,077,104 bp
Band	9p21.3	End	21,077,942 bp

Gene location (Mouse)
Chr.	Chromosome 4 (mouse)
Band	4 C4|4 41.91 cM	Start	88,440,262 bp
Band	4 C4|4 41.91 cM	End	88,441,011 bp
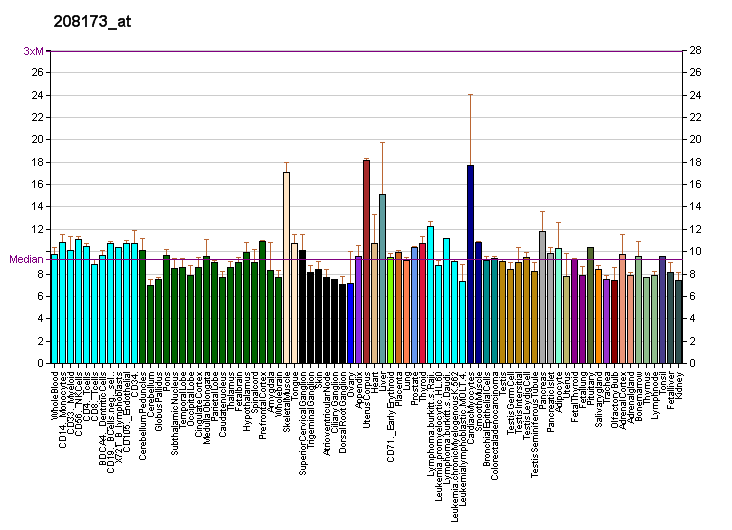
RNA expression pattern
Bgee	Human / Mouse (ortholog); Top expressed in: gonad; bone; granulocyte; epithelium of colon; bone marrow; islet of Langerhans; upper lobe of lung; upper lobe of left lung; left lobe of thyroid gland / Top expressed in: sternocleidomastoid muscle; triceps brachii muscle; temporal muscle; digastric muscle; artery; skin of abdomen; carotid body; More reference expression data
BioGPS	More reference expression data
Gene ontology
Molecular function	cytokine activity; cytokine receptor binding; chloramphenicol O-acetyltransferase activity; type I interferon receptor binding
Cellular component	extracellular space; extracellular region
Biological process	positive regulation of peptidyl-serine phosphorylation of STAT protein; blood coagulation; B cell differentiation; cellular response to interferon-beta; regulation of MHC class I biosynthetic process; negative regulation of viral genome replication; natural killer cell activation; B cell activation involved in immune response; positive regulation of apoptotic signaling pathway; cell surface receptor signaling pathway; natural killer cell activation involved in immune response; response to exogenous dsRNA; response to virus; T cell activation involved in immune response; positive regulation of transcription by RNA polymerase II; defense response; negative regulation of T cell differentiation; positive regulation of innate immune response; cellular response to exogenous dsRNA; negative regulation of T-helper 2 cell cytokine production; defense response to virus; type I interferon signaling pathway; regulation of signaling receptor activity; humoral immune response; B cell proliferation; adaptive immune response; cytokine-mediated signaling pathway
Sources:Amigo / QuickGO
Orthologs
Databases	NCBI: entry; OMA: entry
Species	Human	Mouse
Entrez	3456	15977
Ensembl	ENSG00000171855	ENSMUSG00000048806
UniProt	P01574	P01575
RefSeq (mRNA)	NM_002176	NM_010510
RefSeq (protein)	NP_002167	NP_034640
Location (UCSC)	Chr 9: 21.08 – 21.08 Mb	Chr 4: 88.44 – 88.44 Mb
PubMed search
- Wikidata
View/Edit Human	View/Edit Mouse

Interferon beta is a protein that in humans is encoded by the IFNB1 gene. The natural and recombinant protein forms have antiviral, antibacterial, and anticancer properties.

Interferon beta 1a (tradenames: Avonex and Rebif) and Interferon beta 1b (tradenames: Betaseron/Betaferon) are used as drugs.
