= IFNA6 =

Protein-coding gene in the species Homo sapiens

Identifiers
- Aliases: IFNA6, IFN-alphaK, interferon alpha 6
- External IDs: OMIM: 147566; MGI: 2667155; GeneCards: IFNA6

Gene location (Human)
Chr.	Chromosome 9 (human)
Band	9p21.3	Start	21,349,835 bp
Band	9p21.3	End	21,351,378 bp

Gene location (Mouse)
Chr.	Chromosome 4 (mouse)
Band	4 C4|4 42.02 cM	Start	88,561,878 bp
Band	4 C4|4 42.02 cM	End	88,562,696 bp
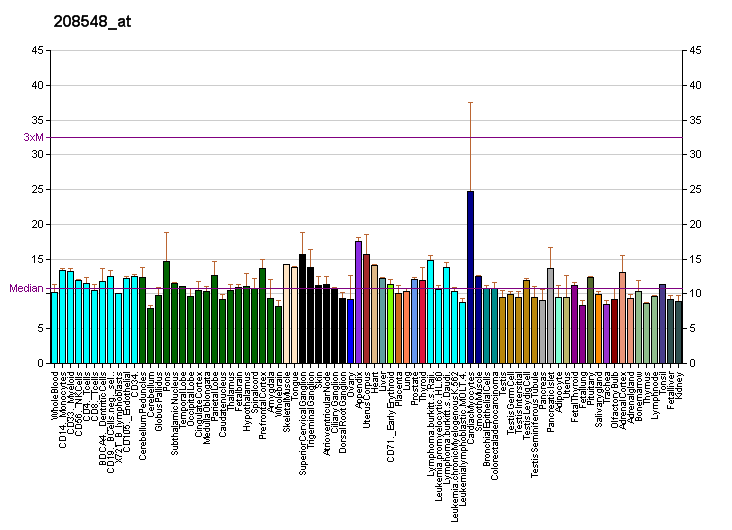
RNA expression pattern
Bgee	Human / Mouse (ortholog); Top expressed in: putamen; caudate nucleus; Brodmann area 9; amygdala; substantia nigra; hippocampus proper; occipital lobe; primary visual cortex; nucleus accumbens; hypothalamus / Top expressed in: embryo; embryo; More reference expression data
BioGPS	More reference expression data
Gene ontology
Molecular function	cytokine activity; type I interferon receptor binding; cytokine receptor binding
Cellular component	extracellular region; extracellular space; cellular component
Biological process	natural killer cell activation involved in immune response; B cell differentiation; defense response; B cell proliferation; blood coagulation; positive regulation of peptidyl-serine phosphorylation of STAT protein; humoral immune response; adaptive immune response; defense response to virus; type I interferon signaling pathway; response to exogenous dsRNA; T cell activation involved in immune response; cytokine-mediated signaling pathway; innate immune response; regulation of signaling receptor activity
Sources:Amigo / QuickGO
Orthologs
Databases	NCBI: entry; OMA: entry
Species	Human	Mouse
Entrez	3443	230396
Ensembl	ENSG00000120235	ENSMUSG00000063376
UniProt	P05013	Q80SU4
RefSeq (mRNA)	NM_021002	NM_177347
RefSeq (protein)	NP_066282	NP_796321
Location (UCSC)	Chr 9: 21.35 – 21.35 Mb	Chr 4: 88.56 – 88.56 Mb
PubMed search
- Wikidata
View/Edit Human	View/Edit Mouse

Interferon alpha-6 is a protein that in humans is encoded by the IFNA6 gene.
