= IFNA10 =

Protein-coding gene in the species Homo sapiens

Identifiers
- Aliases: IFNA10, IFN-alphaC, interferon, alpha 10, interferon alpha 10
- External IDs: OMIM: 147577; MGI: 2667155; GeneCards: IFNA10

Gene location (Human)
Chr.	Chromosome 9 (human)
Band	9p21.3	Start	21,206,181 bp
Band	9p21.3	End	21,207,143 bp

Gene location (Mouse)
Chr.	Chromosome 4 (mouse)
Band	4 C4|4 42.02 cM	Start	88,561,878 bp
Band	4 C4|4 42.02 cM	End	88,562,696 bp
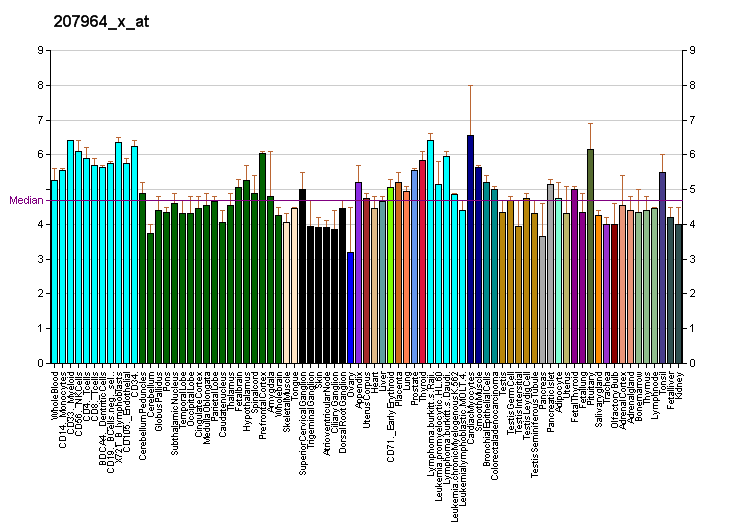
RNA expression pattern
Bgee	Human / Mouse (ortholog); Top expressed in: brain; prefrontal cortex; blood; cerebral cortex; multicellular organism / Top expressed in: embryo; embryo; More reference expression data
BioGPS	More reference expression data
Gene ontology
Molecular function	cytokine activity; type I interferon receptor binding; cytokine receptor binding
Cellular component	extracellular region; extracellular space
Biological process	natural killer cell activation involved in immune response; B cell differentiation; defense response; B cell proliferation; blood coagulation; positive regulation of peptidyl-serine phosphorylation of STAT protein; humoral immune response; adaptive immune response; defense response to virus; type I interferon signaling pathway; response to exogenous dsRNA; T cell activation involved in immune response; innate immune response; cytokine-mediated signaling pathway; regulation of signaling receptor activity
Sources:Amigo / QuickGO
Orthologs
Databases	NCBI: entry; OMA: entry
Species	Human	Mouse
Entrez	3446	230396
Ensembl	ENSG00000186803	ENSMUSG00000063376
UniProt	P01566	Q80SU4
RefSeq (mRNA)	NM_002171	NM_177347
RefSeq (protein)	NP_002162	NP_796321
Location (UCSC)	Chr 9: 21.21 – 21.21 Mb	Chr 4: 88.56 – 88.56 Mb
PubMed search
- Wikidata
View/Edit Human	View/Edit Mouse

Interferon alpha-10 is a protein that in humans is encoded by the IFNA10 gene.
