= IFNA4 =

Protein-coding gene in the species Homo sapiens

Identifiers
- Aliases: IFNA4, IFN-alpha4a, INFA4, interferon, alpha 4, interferon alpha 4
- External IDs: OMIM: 147564; MGI: 3649260; GeneCards: IFNA4

Gene location (Human)
| Chr. | Chromosome 9 (human) |
| Band | 9p21.3 | Start | 21,186,694 bp |
| Band | 9p21.3 | End | 21,187,671 bp |

Gene location (Mouse)
| Chr. | Chromosome 4 (mouse) |
| Band | 4 C4|4 | Start | 88,594,152 bp |
| Band | 4 C4|4 | End | 88,595,161 bp |
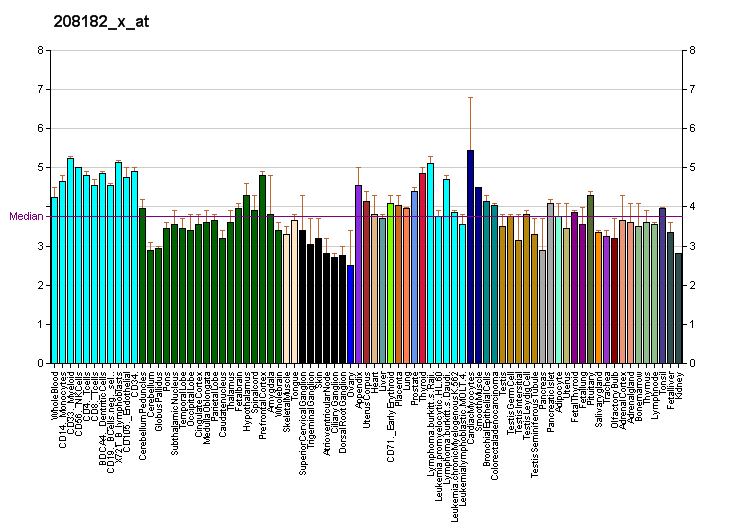
RNA expression pattern
| Bgee | Human / Mouse (ortholog); Top expressed in: aorta; thoracic aorta; ascending aorta / n/a; More reference expression data |
| BioGPS | More reference expression data |
Gene ontology
| Molecular function | cytokine activity; type I interferon receptor binding; protein binding; cytokine receptor binding |
| Cellular component | extracellular region; extracellular space |
| Biological process | defense response; adaptive immune response; response to exogenous dsRNA; response to virus; blood coagulation; positive regulation of peptidyl-serine phosphorylation of STAT protein; natural killer cell activation involved in immune response; B cell proliferation; humoral immune response; defense response to virus; type I interferon signaling pathway; B cell differentiation; T cell activation involved in immune response; cytokine-mediated signaling pathway; innate immune response; regulation of signaling receptor activity |
Sources:Amigo / QuickGO
Orthologs
| Databases | NCBI: entry; OMA: entry |
| Species | Human | Mouse |
| Entrez | 3441 | 230398 |
| Ensembl | ENSG00000236637 | ENSMUSG00000078355 |
| UniProt | P05014 | Q810G1 |
| RefSeq (mRNA) | NM_021068 | NM_206867 |
| RefSeq (protein) | NP_066546 | NP_996750 |
| Location (UCSC) | Chr 9: 21.19 – 21.19 Mb | Chr 4: 88.59 – 88.6 Mb |
| PubMed search |
- Wikidata
| View/Edit Human | View/Edit Mouse |

Interferon alpha-4 is a protein that in humans is encoded by the IFNA4 gene.
