= IFNA13 =

Protein-coding gene in the species Homo sapiens

Identifiers
- Aliases: IFNA13, interferon alpha 13
- External IDs: OMIM: 147578; GeneCards: IFNA13
Available structures
PDB	Human UniProt search: PDBe RCSB
PDB	List of PDB id codes 3UX9

Gene location (Human)
Chr.	Chromosome 9 (human)
Band	9p21.3	Start	21,367,424 bp
Band	9p21.3	End	21,368,962 bp
RNA expression pattern
Bgee	Human / Mouse (ortholog); Top expressed in: corpus callosum; putamen; primary visual cortex; caudate nucleus; Brodmann area 9; amygdala; hippocampus proper; gastric mucosa; stromal cell of endometrium; substantia nigra / n/a; More reference expression data
BioGPS	n/a
Gene ontology
Molecular function	cytokine activity; type I interferon receptor binding; cytokine receptor binding
Cellular component	extracellular region; extracellular space
Biological process	natural killer cell activation involved in immune response; B cell differentiation; defense response; B cell proliferation; blood coagulation; positive regulation of peptidyl-serine phosphorylation of STAT protein; humoral immune response; adaptive immune response; defense response to virus; type I interferon signaling pathway; response to exogenous dsRNA; T cell activation involved in immune response; cytokine-mediated signaling pathway; innate immune response; regulation of signaling receptor activity
Sources:Amigo / QuickGO
Orthologs
Databases	NCBI: entry; OMA: entry
Species	Human	Mouse
Entrez	3447	n/a
Ensembl	ENSG00000233816	n/a
UniProt	P01562	n/a
RefSeq (mRNA)	NM_006900	n/a
RefSeq (protein)	NP_076918	n/a
Location (UCSC)	Chr 9: 21.37 – 21.37 Mb	n/a
PubMed search		n/a
- Wikidata
View/Edit Human

Interferon alpha-1/13, also known as IFN-alpha-1/13, is a protein that in humans is encoded by the IFNA1 and IFNA13 genes.
