= Median price ratio =

Drug price comparison metric

Variability of lowest prices for Metformin 500 mg cap/tab. Median price ratio of the latest lowest generic price over the MSH international reference price for Metformin 500 mg cap/tab, according to WHO/HAI methodology in 2015 or latest data. Prices below 100% are cheaper than the international reference price.

The median price ratio (MPR) is the ratio given by dividing the median local unit price of a medication by the median international reference unit price, usually from the International Medical Products Price Guide. This measure was created in 2003 by the Health Action International (HAI) and World Health Organization (WHO) as a standard measure to facilitate national and international comparisons of drug prices.

Originator brand versus lowest generic prices for Metformin 500 mg cap/tab. Median price ratio of the latest lowest generic price or originator brand price over the MSH international reference price for Metformin 500 mg cap/tab, according to WHO/HAI methodology. Prices below 100% are cheaper than the international reference price.

In the WHO/HAI systematic methodology, the same provider of international reference unit price "must be used for all medicines surveyed – global, regional and supplementary", to ensure a consistent basis for comparison.

Some authors criticized the MPR, as it can be skewed by the international reference price. For example, a 10% MPR for a $10 reference price yields an absolute price variation of $1, whereas for a $200 reference price the variation would be $20. To solve this issue, the WHO/HAI recommend to check the international reference price when very high or low MPR variations are observed.

The MPR has been used in several studies investigating the availability and variation of medication prices, and the effects of various medication pricing policies.

The HAI maintains a regularly updated database of worldwide MPR surveys.
