= ADQ =

ADQ may refer to:

- Abductor digiti quinti (disambiguation), a muscle on the outer border of foot or hand
- Abu Dhabi Developmental Holding Company (branded as ADQ), a sovereign wealth fund in Abu Dhabi
- Action démocratique du Québec, defunct political party in Quebec, Canada
- Agotime language, a Kwa language of Ghana
- American Dairy Queen Corporation, American franchiser of Dairy Queen restaurants
- Average daily quantity, a measure of drug consumption, similar to 'defined daily dose'
- Kodiak Airport in Alaska, US (IATA airport code ADQ)
