= Access to medicines =

Access to medicines refers to the reasonable ability for people to get needed medicines required to achieve health. Such access is deemed to be part of the right to health as supported by international law since 1946.

The World Health Organization states that essential medicines should be available, of good quality, and accessible. Reasonable access to medicines can be in conflict with intellectual property and free markets. In the developing world people may not get treatment for conditions like HIV/AIDS.

== Hindrances to access ==
Most hindrances to access revolve around market competition and lack of it.

=== Patent protection and exclusivity ===
Patents provide an owner exclusive rights to a product or process for 20 years in a particular territory. The owner of the patent has the right to prevent the manufacture, use, sale, import, or distribution of the patented product. It is argued that patent protection allows pharmaceutical companies a monopoly on particular drugs and processes.

=== Data exclusivity ===
Data exclusivity is a regulatory measure limiting the use of clinical trial data and provides conductor of the trial temporary exclusive rights to the data. Many suggest that extending exclusivity periods can have consequences in delivering medication, especially generic brands, to developing countries. However, extending patent terms can be reinvested for research and development and/or a source of funding for drug donations to low-income countries. Others suggest that data exclusivity works to diminish the availability of generic drugs. Many argue that pharmaceutical companies push for data exclusivity—seeking to extend their monopolies by advocating for market exclusivity provided by patents and data exclusivity, or protection for new medicine.

=== Cost ===
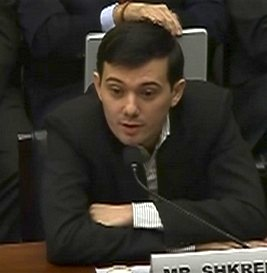
Martin Shkreli testifying before the House Committee on Oversight and Government Reform, 2016

In some countries pharmaceutical company have ultimate control of the pricing of their patented product. Therefore, the owner has control of the pricing of the medication, based on the price level the owner deems best to reflects their ability to manufacture and the level of profit desired. Purchasers have little say over the price set. It is argued that competition is necessary to lower drug prices and improve access to affordable medications.

Price gouging is defined as the excessive increase in prices by sellers of essential goods to a level deemed higher than reasonable or fair. This sharp increase in prices may leave the buyer vulnerable. It also leads to inequitable access to essential goods among different socioeconomic groups. It is argued that pharmaceutical companies have dramatically increased prices for treatments that are essential in treating diseases such as HIV/AIDS, hepatitis C, and cancer.

=== Lack of Generic Brands ===
Many argue that generic brand production in developing countries increases competition and therefore is essential to bridge the global drug gap. As argued by various sources, the push for more measures such as market and data exclusivity, hinders low-income countries' ability to manufacture and produce generic drugs. However, low-income countries often lack the essential infrastructure to allow for generic brand production. In order the use of the medication to be effective, it must be manufactured in optimal laboratory conditions. Developing countries often lack air conditioning, stable electrical power, or refrigerators to store samples and chemicals. Also, quality generic brand production is limited by a government's ability to create effective spaces of market competition and to monitor the quality of generics brands; this ability has been found to be limited in certain developing countries. It also argued that international aid, state investment, and measures for infection prevention are necessary to allow for generic brand production in low-income countries.

=== Language and cultural barriers ===
Among populations that do not speak the main language in an area access to medicine can be hindered by language barriers as well as other cultural barriers. There is evidence that access is improved by having medical workers that speak the language of patients, as patients will be more likely to know about and to take medicines.

== Legislation ==
Logo of the World Trade Organization (WTO)

=== Trips agreement ===
The Agreement on Trade-Related Aspects of Intellectual Property Rights (TRIPS), is a multilateral agreement between all member nations of the World Trade Organization (WTO), effective January 1995. This agreement introduced global standards for enforcing and protecting nearly all forms of intellectual property rights (IPR), including those for patents and data protection. Under the TRIPS Agreement, WTO member nations, with a few exceptions, are required to adjust their laws to the minimum standards of IPR protection. Member nations are also obligated to follow specific enforcement guidelines, remedies, and dispute resolution procedures. Before TRIPS, other international conventions and laws did not specify minimum standards for intellectual property laws in the international trading system. The TRIPS Agreement is argued to have the greatest effect on the pharmaceutical industry and access to medicines. It is argued that the TRIPS agreement negatively impacted generic drug industries in countries such as India. However, others argue that the agreement is open to interpretation. A clause in the TRIPS agreement allows compulsory licensing, which permits the manufacture of generic brands of patented drugs, at prices set in a competitive market in cases of national emergencies. For example, many believe that the HIV/AIDs crisis in Africa and South East Asia and the inadequate access to essential AIDs medications constitute a national emergency. Therefore, the TRIPS Agreement can be interpreted to allow the manufacture of generic brands of patented HIV/AIDs drugs

=== Doha Declaration ===
Further legislation such as Doha Declaration of 2001 worked to rectify the negative impact of the TRIPS Agreement. The Doha Declaration on the TRIPS Agreement and Public Health, effective November 2001, was adopted by WTO Ministerial Conference of 2001. Many argued that the TRIPS Agreement hindered developing countries from implementing measures to improve access to affordable medicines, especially for diseases of public health concern, such as HIV, tuberculosis, and malaria. The Doha Declaration responds to concerns of developing countries that patent protection rules and other IPRs were hindering access to affordable medicines for populations in those countries. The Doha Declaration emphasizes the flexibility of the TRIPS Agreement and highlights the right of respective government to interpret the TRIPS Agreement in terms of public health. It refers to specific parts of TRIPS, such as the use of compulsory licensing for pharmaceutical drugs only in the case of a national emergency and circumstances of extreme urgency and the right to determine what constitutes this—such as to address public health issues.

==== Paragraph 6 System ====
The declaration also allows for countries without manufacturing capabilities to turn to another country for the export of generic brands of patented medicines. This is known as the paragraph 6 system. As of 2010 it had only been called upon once, concerning the export of medicines from Canada to Rwanda, with varying opinions about its results and potential.

==== Voluntary Licensing ====
Another mechanism to enable access to essential medicines in low- and middle-income countries (LMICs) is a voluntary license (VL). A VL is an agreement where an originator manufacturer allows a generic manufacturer to produce and sell a patented drug in specific countries under certain terms. These licences can be established directly between patent holders and generic manufacturers or through patent pooling mechanisms like the Medicines Patent Pool. Such licences, are often non-exclusive and granted to multiple manufacturers. A study in The Lancet suggest that voluntary licensing was an effective tool in advancing access to Hepatitis C antiviral medicines. VL has also been effective in increasing access to HIV medicines in the development world via the Medicines Patent Pool. On the hand there are groups critical of voluntary licensing including Médecins Sans Frontières (MSF).

== Differences by geography ==
HIV/AIDS prevalence world map in 2009 according to UNAIDS data

=== Africa ===
There is estimated to be more than 4 million HIV infected individuals in South Africa. Out of this, only 10,000 individuals are able to afford access to essential AIDS medications at their current prices. In Malawi, out of one million infected individuals, 30 have access to life-sustaining essential AIDS medications. In Uganda, out of the estimated 820,000 infected individuals, only about 1.2% can afford essential AIDS medications.

=== Latin America ===
There is estimated to be 1.8 million individuals HIV infected individuals in the Latin American region. Brazil is argued to be one of the most affected by the AIDS epidemic. There is also a high prevalence of HIV in smaller countries such as Guatemala, Honduras, and Belize. However, Brazil is argued not to have restrictive patent laws. In the mid-1990s, Brazil began manufacturing generic versions of vital AIDS medication. Due to this, Brazil's AIDS mortality rate declined by almost 50%.

=== India ===
Many Indian families live below the poverty line due to healthcare expenses. From 1972 to 2005, due to a lack of patent laws for drugs in India, Indian drug companies were able to use alternative, legal processes to manufacture generic versions of drugs. These generic drug companies were able to produce low-priced drugs that were considered among the lowest in the world. This allowed India to provide free antiretroviral treatment to 340,000 HIV infected individuals in the country. Majority of adult antiretroviral drugs purchased for donor-funded programs in developing countries were supplied by Indian generic drug companies. In compliance to the Agreement on Trade-Related Aspects of Intellectual Property Rights (TRIPS), India reintroduced patent laws for drugs in 2015.

== Differences by sector ==
=== Vaccines ===
The majority of deaths from vaccine-preventable diseases occur in low and middle income countries. In low-income countries, more than 90% of deaths are from pneumococcal disease, 95% from Hib, and 80% from hepatitis B. Although widely used by high-income countries, in 2006, Hib vaccine usage in Africa was about 24% In the Americas, Hepatitis B vaccine usage was at 90%. In Southeast Asia, where there is hepatitis B epidemic, the Hib vaccine coverage was only 28%. The human papillomavirus (HPV) vaccine is considered the most expensive vaccine in history. However, the majority of those that have cervical cancer are in developing countries.

== Epidemics and access ==
=== HIV/AIDS ===
The appearance of generic manufacturers in low-income countries, such as India and Brazil, was key to increasing access to HIV/AIDS treatment in low- and middle- income countries (LMICs). Due to the introduction of generic brand competition, first-line antiretroviral drugs' prices dropped by more than 99%, from $10,000/year per patient in 2000 to less than $70 in 2014.

Civil society organizations in India, led by the Sankalp Rehabilitation Trust, are opposing Gilead Sciences' patent applications for the HIV drug lenacapavir. They argue that allowing generic competition is essential for making the long-acting drug affordable in middle-income countries. Lenacapavir, a twice-yearly injection, has shown strong potential for HIV prevention, offering hope for ending AIDS if widely accessible. The Indian Patent Office will hear the Trust's objections on September 19. The Trust claims that two of Gilead's patent applications, concerning salt forms of the drug, lack true innovation.

Gilead Sciences has agreed to voluntary licensing deals allowing companies to produce generic versions of its HIV drug, lenacapavir, for 120 low- and lower-middle-income countries. This decision follows clinical trials showing the drug's effectiveness in preventing HIV, particularly as a twice-yearly injectable, which could address the challenges of daily pill adherence and stigma.

=== Malaria ===
The chemical structure of pyrimethamine, commonly known as Daraprim

On August 10, 2015, Turing Pharmaceuticals, a pharmaceutical company owned by Martin Shkreli, purchased the rights to a Daraprim. Daraprim, an anti-parasitic and anti-malarial drug, is considered an essential drug for HIV treatments. It is widely used to treat patients with AIDS-related and AIDs-unrelated toxoplasmosis. At the time, no other generic versions of the drug was available. Turing dramatically raised the price of the drug from $13.50 a tablet to $750, a 5000% increase.

=== Tuberculosis (TB) ===
Johnson & Johnson announced 2023 that it did not intend to enforce its patents bedaquiline for the treatment of multidrug-resistant TB in 134 LMIC countries. Johnson & Johnson also granted Stop TB Partnership´s Global Drug Facility`s a license that enabled the tender, procurement and supply of generic versions of bedaquiline.

During the 2024 opening of the World Conference on Lung Health in Bali, Indonesia, numerous tuberculosis activists took to the stage to call on Cepheid and its parent company, Danaher, to lower the price of GeneXpert TB diagnostic tests to $5 in low- and middle-income countries. Although Danaher reduced the cost of its standard TB test from $10 to $8 in September 2023, the price of the test for detecting extensively drug-resistant TB remains $15. A 2019 study commissioned by Doctors Without Borders revealed that GeneXpert cartridges could be manufactured and sold profitably for under $5 each. Lowering the cost of these tests is crucial, as tuberculosis has regained its position as the world's deadliest infectious disease, surpassing COVID-19. In 2023, approximately 8.2 million new TB cases were reported, alongside 1.25 million deaths.

=== Cystic Fibrosis ===
In 2024, South African regulators have concluded that Vertex Pharmaceuticals has adequately addressed access to its cystic fibrosis treatments, closing a contentious investigation that highlighted the high costs of the company's medications. However, this decision has drawn criticism from patient advocacy groups, who argue that the outcome remains unfair and that some individuals with cystic fibrosis. The case gained international attention when a coalition of families and activists petitioned governments in South Africa, India, Brazil, and Ukraine to allow access to lower-cost generic versions of Trikafta, a highly effective triple-combination therapy. This effort was part of a broader, ongoing campaign to increase access to Vertex's treatments. Over the years, similar advocacy efforts have fueled disputes between the company and financially constrained governments, as patients and their families push for more affordable options.

== Campaigns ==
A number of countries and organizations have efforts to improve access to medicines in specific areas of the world.

The Canada's Access to Medicines Regime allows developing countries to bring in medicines at lower cost. It specifically allows companies in Canada who may not own the right to make a medication to do so for export to certain countries in the developing world.

Médecins Sans Frontières has had such a campaign since 1999 known as the Campaign for Access to Essential Medicines. On June 20, 2024, MSF announced closing down its Access-to-medicines campaign focused on enabling access to medicines in resource limited settings. MSF plans to replace the campaign with a new effort that will focus on products, like medicines and vaccines, that MSF needs for its own relief efforts. Several advocates have criticized this move including the Treatment Action Group.

In Tanzania, the Ministry of Health and the Tanzania Food and Drugs Authority and the Strategies for Enhancing Access to Medicines Program introduced accredited drug dispensing outlets, with aid from Bill & Melinda Gates Foundation. It worked to create a nationwide chain of dispensers, which provide quality pharmaceutical drugs and services to its citizens.

The GAVI vaccination alliance is an international public-private partnership, created in 2000, devoted to improving access to vaccines in low-income countries. The organization partners with several developing countries, donor governments, research agencies, and vaccines companies in both in industrialized and developing countries. It also partners with organizations such as the World Health Organization, UNICEF, the World Bank, the Bill & Melinda Gates Foundation and other private philanthropists. GAVI is noted as an important source of external funding for vaccines in low-income countries and played a crucial role in introducing the HPV vaccine and other new vaccines to developing countries.

In Kenya, the Kenya Coalition for Access to Essential Medicines (KCAEM), was formed in response to Kenya's Industrial Property Act 2001. The act outlined the rights of patent holders. Members of this coalition are local community-based and national NGOs, international NGOs, healthcare providers, journalists, lawyers and other individuals. The coalition works primarily with people living with HIV/AIDS and access to essential HIV/AIDS medications and treatments. It urges for flexibility in interpreting the TRIPS Agreement and efforts to implement production of generic antiretroviral drugs by local manufacturers and/or to import inexpensive drugs. It also calls for pharmaceutical companies to reduce the price of their medications. The coalition has garnered support from key government officials and organizations such as Kenyan Property Institute, Kenyan Ministry of Trade, and the Minister of Trade Mr. Nicholas Biwott MP.

== See also ==
- WHO Model List of Essential Medicines
- Access to Medicine Index
- Medication costs
- Cost of drug development
