= WHO/Health Action International Project on Medicine Prices and Availability =

Partnership between the World Health Organization and Health Action International

The WHO/Health Action International Project on Medicine Prices and Availability was a partnership between the World Health Organization and Health Action International. It developed a system and methodology for measuring the price, availability and affordability of medicines. The project surveyed over 50 countries. It also created guidance for low-and-middle-income countries to help their governments and associated health organisations to implement policies on drug prices.

== Survey medicines ==
A price survey may look at up to 50 medicines. There are 14 global core medicines that enable international comparisons, 16 regional core medicines that enable regional comparisons, and 20 supplementary medicines that are locally important. When comparing prices, one dosage form and strength is specified for each medicine. To calculate affordability, a typical treatment schedule is specified.

The 14 global medicines
Drug	Indication	Unit strength/form	Quantity	Treatment Schedule
Amitriptyline	Depression	25 mg tablet	90 tablets	Three times a day for a month
Amoxicillin	Adult respiratory tract infection	500 mg tablet	21 tablets	Three times a day for a week
Atenolol	High blood pressure	50 mg tablet	30 tablets	Once a day for a month
Captopril	High blood pressure	25 mg tablet	60 tablets	Twice a day for a month
Ceftriaxone	Adult respiratory tract infection	1 g/vial for injection	1 injection	Once
Ciprofloxacin	Adult respiratory tract infection	500 mg tablet	14 tablets	Twice a day for one week
Co-trimoxazole	Paediatric respiratory tract infection	8+40 mg/ml suspension	70ml	5ml twice a day for one week
Diazepam	Anxiety	5 mg tablet	7 tablets	Once a day for a week
Diclofenac	Arthritis	50 mg tablet	60 tablets	Twice a day for a month
Glibenclamide	Diabetes	5 mg tablet	60 tablets	Twice a day for a month
Omeprazole	Stomach ulcer	20 mg tablet	30 tablets	Once a day for a month
Paracetamol	Paediatric pain and inflammation	24 mg/ml suspension	45ml	5ml three times a day for three days
Salbutamol	Asthma	0.1 mg/dose inhaler	One inhaler	200 doses
Simvastatin	High cholesterol	20 mg tablet	30 tablets	Once a day for a month

== International reference price ==
For each medicine surveyed, the local price is compared with an international reference price. This is usually drawn from MSH's International Medical Products Price Guide. This guide contains, for each drug, a set of prices from suppliers to developing countries and also a set of prices agreed by buyers such as government departments of health. The median of the supplier prices is preferred and even a single supplier price is superior to multiple buyer prices. The quality of the international reference price depends on the number of suppliers quoting for that product. For example, a single high supplier price may skew the survey results.

== Methodology ==
The purpose of external reference pricing is to allow for a systematic comparison of medicine prices, both nationally and internationally. The World Health Organization and Health Action International (WHO/HAI) made a conjoint effort to systematize the methodology of medicine price surveys and ERP usage, first publishing the WHO/HAI methodology in manual in 2003, which is frequently used in price studies in unregulated prices context often found in low and moderate income countries (LMICs), but it was also used in high-income countries. This methodology was devised to improve price transparency and ultimately medicines availability and affordability, and is the basis of most medicine price studies in the LMICs.

This methodology advises that the same provider of international reference unit price "must be used for all medicines surveyed – global, regional and supplementary", to ensure a consistent basis for comparison, such as the International Medical Products Price Guide. The WHO/HAI mention the possibility of using different reference price providers in the same study, but this is challenging and no methodology is provided. The comparison of the prices of individual medicines, instead of an arbitrary clusters of medicines (eg, using ATC levels), is considered the most robust method, although avoiding clustering then restricts the comparison to a subset of medicines available in all the surveyed countries since imputing may produce more bias. Survey medicines need to be described with a specific strength and dose form.

The reference basket is the set of countries where reference prices are sampled from. It is advised to select countries with similar income status as the target one, as including countries with higher income can lead to higher reference prices. However, it may not always be possible due to lack of data, prices being better documented in high-income countries. Increasing the number of reference countries in the basket has an important effect for decreasing prices when using ERP for drug price regulation.

The final price of medicines is impacted by several price components at various stages of the supply chain, with later stages likely increasing the medicine's price. The WHO/HAI provide the following 5 stages taxonomy of the medicines prices in the supply chain:

1. Manufacturer's selling price plus insurance and freight: the price charged by the pharmaceutical manufacturer, including the cost of insurance and shipping the medicines to the countries of destination.
2. Landed price: medicine cost after importation in a country, after clearing customs and import requirements and then supplied to the main distributor.
3. Wholesale selling price for private providers, or central medical stores price for public providers: medicine price including the landed price plus any wholesale markup and regional or state taxes, and transport costs from the wholesaler to the retailer.
4. Retail price (private sector) or dispensary price (public sector): wholesale price plus the retail markup added by pharmacies and other retailers to cover their costs, including their profit. Local or town taxes may be levied at this stage.
5. Dispensed price: retail price plus sales taxes such as value-added tax (VAT) or a general sales tax (GST) and (dispensing) fees that are collected when the medicine is dispensed.

The WHO later developed another taxonomy in 2018, the MWPP price taxonomy:

1. Ex-factory price (synonym of manufacturer's selling price): the industrial price of the medicine as charged by a pharmaceutical manufacturer.
2. Wholesale price (synonym of pharmacy purchase price): price charged by wholesalers to the retailers, usually community pharmacies. It includes the ex-factory price plus any remuneration for pharmaceutical wholesale (i.e., wholesale markup or wholesale margin).
3. Pharmacy retail price net (synonym of consumer or public price): price charged by community pharmacies to the general public. This includes the wholesale price plus any pharmacy remuneration (i.e., pharmacy markup, pharmacy margin or dispensing fee), but without including taxes such as value-added tax (VAT).
4. Pharmacy retail price gross: same as pharmacy retail price net plus taxes such as VAT.

Although the two taxonomies have strong similarities, the MWPP taxonomy relates to high-income countries with price regulation, whereas the WHO/HAI taxonomy includes more stages for non-price regulated settings, the major difference being the specification of landed price as a separate price component for the different intermediaries.

The ex-factory/manufacturer's price is considered more accurate and thus preferable for international price comparisons. The WHO recommends the use of the median supplier price for the reference countries of the target medication in the International Medical Products Price Guide for all studies. Although the manufacturer's price is advised for prices analyses, it is advisable, or even key, for the design of pharmaceutical pricing policies to calculate ERPs at different stages of the medicine prices according to the WHO/HAI, to examine the contribution of each stage in the supply chain to the final price and isolate them from the manufacturer's selling price. Multi-countries prices comparisons should be done using the same price type. The International Medical Products Price Guide usually does not include insurance or transportation charges.

The choice of the database(s) to use is also crucial and should not be solely made on considerations of availability, although this is an important factor. Adjustments to inflation/deflation are advised when comparing multiple years.

The HAI maintains a regularly updated database of worldwide drug price surveys following the WHO/HAI methodology, which is a method that offers data collection tools to obtain medicine price and availability information in countries or settings where access to price information is not accessible in a centralized manner, such as in low-or-moderate-income countries.

=== Connex measures ===
The external reference prices allow to derive connex measures, such as the median price ratio or the affordability. Affordability is "the number of days’ wages required by the lowest-paid unskilled government worker to purchase 7 days’ supply of a medicine to treat an acute condition, and 30 days for a chronic condition, based on standard treatment regimens". Affordability allows to express medicine costs as the ability of an individual's ability to pay for it, which is more relatable for the general public and "serves as an advocacy tool". Cross-country comparisons of affordability are possible.

The same methodology can be applied to evaluate medicines availability, compared to a basket of reference countries.
