= Jill Sheffield =

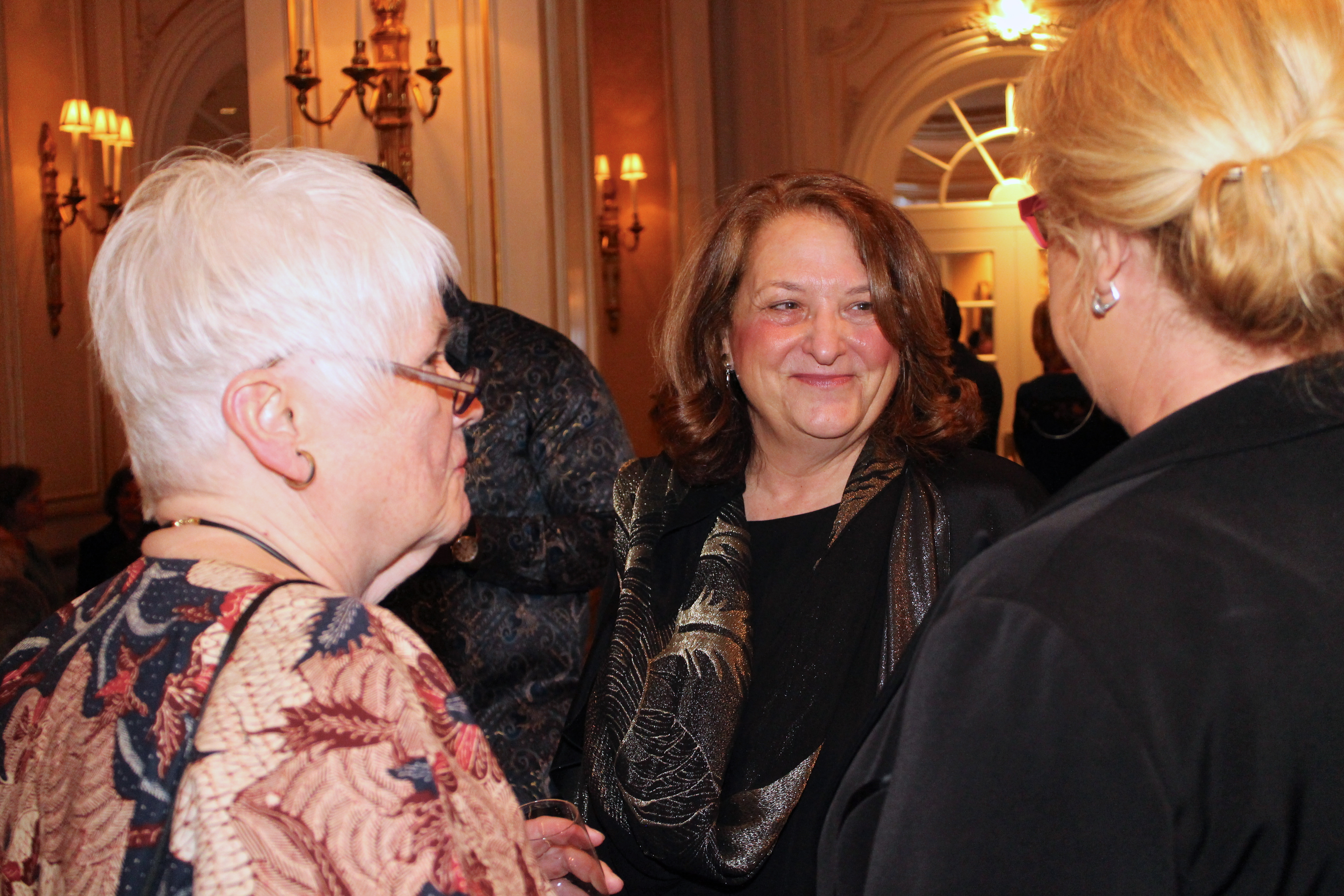
- Jill Sheffield (left) at 21 Leaders Honorees
- Born: Jill Sheffield
- Education: Glassboro State College (BA) Columbia University (MA)
- Notable work: Founder of Women Deliver

Jill Sheffield is a women's sexual and reproductive health and rights advocate, with a focus on reducing global maternal mortality. She is the founder of Women Deliver.

== Life and career ==
Sheffield earned a Bachelor of Arts in education in 1961 from Glassboro State College (now Rowan University) and a Master of Arts in comparative and international education in 1963 from Columbia University.

She volunteered at the Pumwami Maternity Hospital's family planning clinic in Kenya in the 1960s, the first such clinic in East Africa. At the time, Kenyan women were legally required to obtain their husbands’ permission to use contraception. Sheffield decided to shift her career focus towards advocating for women's reproductive freedom, sexual health, and mother's rights. Sheffield served as director of the Carnegie Corporation of New York's international education programs and as director of Africa and Latin America programs and regional representative for World Education.

In 1987, Sheffield co-founded Family Care International (FCI), a non-profit global organization focused on improving the maternal health of women in the world's poorest nations. Sheffield was the president for 20 years. FCI was the first international organization founded specifically to focus on maternal mortality, family planning and reproductive rights. FCI was also integrated into Management Sciences for Health in 2015.

In 2007, Sheffield founded Women Deliver, which began as a conference focused on maternal health that evolved into an advocacy organization. It seeks to generate political commitment and financial investment to reduce maternal mortality and increase access to reproductive health.

In 2011, Sheffield served as one of 30 commissioners on the UN Commission on Information and Accountability for Women's and Children's Health. Sheffield has been involved with the International Planned Parenthood Federation/Western Hemisphere Region, and Population Communications International. Sheffield has been chair of Woman Care Global (now Catalyst Global), chair of the FIGO Committee on Contraception and Family Planning, external advisor to the IPPF Governing Council, and senior adviser to Global Health Strategies. In 2018, Sheffield was named a board member of Catalyst Global (formerly WCG Cares).

== Honors & recognition ==
The American Public Health Association granted Sheffield its Lifetime Achievement Award in 2008, the same year that Family Care International received the United Nations Population Award for outstanding work in sexual and reproductive health and rights. Sheffield has also been recognized as a distinguished alumna by Columbia University's Teachers College.

Along with Melinda Gates, Sheffield was awarded the 2016 Champions for Change Lifetime Achievement Award by the International Center for Research on Women (ICRW).
