= Tanzila Khan =

Pakistani disability rights activist and founder of Girlythings

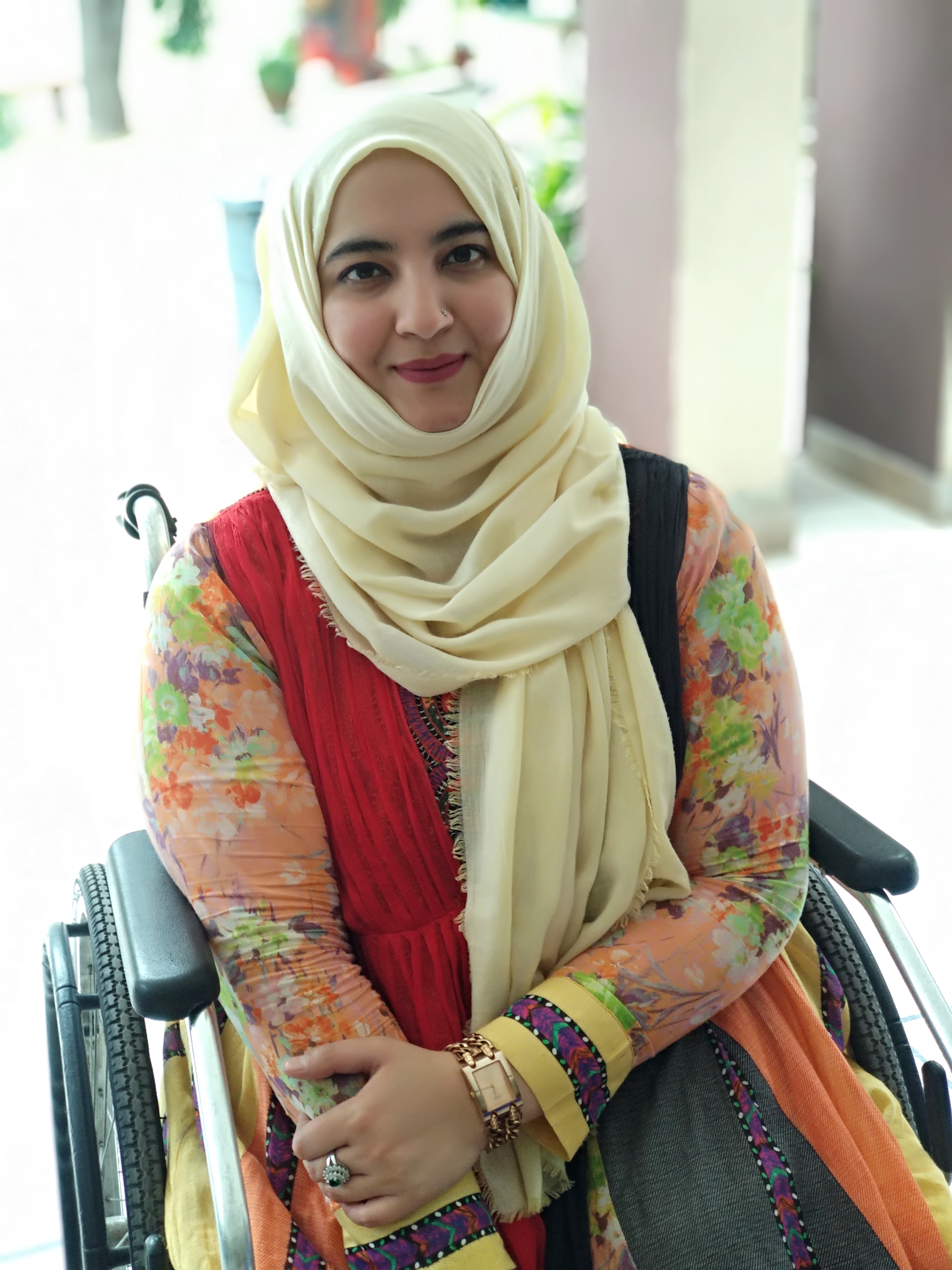
- Born: 1990 (age 35–36); Sialkot, Pakistan
- Citizenship: Pakistan
- Education: BSC International Development from University of London
- Occupations: Public speaker, disability rights activist, entrepreneur, filmmaker and writer.
- Organization(s): Girlythings.pk, iwish, and creative alley.

Tanzila Khan is a Pakistani entrepreneur, disability rights activist, author and founder of Girlythings PK, a platform and website that delivers sanitary napkins to women in Pakistan. Khan focuses on raising awareness of and access to diversity and inclusion in all sectors, reproductive health and education especially for those with disabilities. She has given talks around the world, written two novels, produced a short film, FruitChaat and runs two organizations to de-stigmatize disability.

Disability Tax, is a term coined by Khan that describes the extra expenses borne by people with disabilities when institutions do not provide accessible options or equally priced alternatives, hence making life even more costly and challenging for those with disabilities.

== Early life ==
Khan has been reliant on a wheelchair since birth. In her youth, she was involved with theater, directing a production of The Addams Family Rendezvous. She later worked for global change-makers youth camp and a Youth Activism Summit, designing several workshops for the latter.

Khan would later revisit the medium of theatre in "Theatre of the Taboo", a training module for sexual and reproductive health and rights and related issues. Khan holds a Bachelor of Laws degree in International Development from the University of London and a Masters in Entrepreneurship degree from Uppsala University, Uppsala Sweden.

== Girly Things ==
Due to the endemic menstrual taboo, support for feminine hygiene products is inadequate in Pakistan. In response, Khan founded the startup company Girly Things PK to make them more accessible for women in Pakistan, delivering sanitary napkins to women at home and in emergency situations, in the manner of a food delivery service. The urgent kits include a disposable undergarment, three pads and a blood stain remover, the latter being an original Girly Things product.

Khan recounts a personal experience of her period starting while she was running errands. She found herself in urgent need, but the shops were not accessible to wheelchair users such as herself. The company aims to expand to offering contraceptives. The company also offers products that some women may be uncomfortable purchasing openly in shops, including toilet seat covers and hair removal creams, and is investigating means for sanitary disposal of used pads.

=== Other projects ===
- Khan wrote, produced and performed in a short film called FruitChaat which addressed challenges of a woman with a disability in Pakistan. The film won Zee5 Award and is available on Youtube on the channel, Iwish.
- Khan is a travel blogger and raising awareness on disability traveling through blogging and her social media channels.

== Works ==
Khan published her first book at 16, using the proceeds to fund community projects in her area. She has written the following works:

- A Story of Mexico
- The Perfect Situation: Sweet Sixteen

== Awards ==
Khan has won the following awards for her activism:

- Amal Clooney Award presented by King Charles, by Prince´s Trust International
- Young Connector of the Future (Swedish Institute)
- Young Leader (Women Deliver)
- Khadija tul Kubra Award (national level recognition for advocacy)
- Youth Champion at Rise Up (Packard Foundation)
- Six-two 35 Under 35 Changemaker of 2018
- Invited to speak at TEDxKinnaird in 2012
