= Medication costs =

Common health care cost

Medication costs, also known as drug costs are a common health care cost for many people and health care systems. Prescription costs are the costs to the end consumer. Medication costs are influenced by multiple factors such as patents, stakeholder influence, and marketing expenses. A number of countries including Canada, parts of Europe, and Brazil use external reference pricing as a means to compare drug prices and to determine a base price for a particular medication. Other countries use pharmacoeconomics, which looks at the cost/benefit of a product in terms of quality of life, alternative treatments (drug and non-drug), and cost reduction or avoidance in other parts of the health care system (for example, a drug may reduce the need for a surgical intervention, thereby saving money). Structures like the UK's National Institute for Health and Clinical Excellence and to a lesser extent Canada's Common Drug Review (a division of the Canadian Agency for Drugs and Technologies in Health) evaluate products in this way.

Medication costs can be listed in a number of ways including cost per defined daily dose, cost per specific period of time, cost per prescribed daily dose, and cost proportional to gross national product.

A November 2020 study found that more than 1.1 million senior citizens in the U.S. Medicare program are expected to die prematurely over the next decade because they will be unable to afford their prescription medications, requiring an additional $17.7 billion to be spent annually on avoidable medical costs due to health complications.

== Definition ==
Medication costs can be the selling price from the manufacturer, that price together with shipping, the wholesale price, the retail price, and the dispensed price.

The dispensed price or prescription cost is defined as a cost which the patient has to pay to get medicines or treatments which are written as directions on prescription by a prescribers. The cost is generally influenced by a financial relationship between pharmaceutical manufacturers, wholesale distributors and pharmacies. In addition to the financial relationship, each nation has different systems to control the cost of prescriptions. In the United States, a pharmacy benefit manager, a third-party organization, such as private insurances or government-run health insurances will implement cost containment programs, such as establishing a formulary, to contain the cost. In the United Kingdom, the government negotiates an overall cap on drugs bill growth with the pharmaceutical industry. In addition a government agency, the National Institute of Health and Care Excellence (NICE) assesses cost effectiveness of individual prescription drugs pricing. The National Health Service also may negotiate direct with individual pharmaceutical companies for certain specialised medicines, as well as running competitive procurements for generic drugs and for patented medicines where there is more than one drug available for a condition. Prescription costs are a regular health care cost for the sick and may mean economic hardship for the underprivileged. With healthcare insurance, the patient in the U.S. pays a co-pay (the amount the patient must pay for each drug or medical visit), a deductible (the amount the patient has to pay before the insurance starts sharing the cost) and co-insurance (the amount the patient has to pay after deductible) for prescription costs. After reaching the out of pocket maximum, the insurance company will pay 100% of the prescription cost. The amount the patient has to pay depends on the healthcare insurance plan the patient has.

As of 2017, prescription costs range from just more than 15% in high income countries to 25% in lower-middle income countries and low income countries.

== Factors ==
Drug costs in different countries
Drug	US	Canada	UK	Spain	Netherlands
Etanercept	$2,225	$1,646	$1,117	$1,386	$1,509
Celecoxib	$225	$51	$112	$164	$112
Glatiramer	$3,903	$1,400	$862	$1,191	$1,190
Duloxetine	$194	$110	$46	$71	$52
Adalimumab	$2,246	$1,950	$1,102	$1,498	$1,498
Esomeprazole	$215	$30	$42	$58	$23

Pricing any pharmaceutical drug for sale to the general public is daunting. Per Forbes, setting a high ceiling price for a new drug could be problematic as physicians could shy away from prescribing the drug, because the cost could be too great for the benefit. Setting too low of a price could imply inferiority, that the drug is too "weak" for the market. There are many different pricing strategies and factors that go into the research and evaluation of a future drug's price with whole departments within US pharmaceutical companies like Pfizer devoted to cost analysis.

This chart shows discrepancies in drug pricing in different countries.

=== Marketing expenses ===
A study has placed the amount spent on drug marketing at 2–19 times that on drug research.

=== Research and development ===
Much research, needed to create drugs is done by the public sector. In addition, pharmaceutical companies also do much research prior to producing medications. The table shows research and development statistics for pharmaceutical companies as of 2013 per Astra Zeneca.

Pharmaceutical company	Number of drugs approved	Average R&D spending per drug (in millions USD)	Total R&D spending from 1997 to 2011 (in millions USD)
AstraZeneca	5	11,790.93	58,955
GlaxoSmithKline	10	8,170.81	81,708
Sanofi	8	7,909.26	63,274
Roche Holding	11	7,803.77	85,841
Pfizer	14	7,727.03	108,178
Johnson & Johnson	15	5,885.65	88,285
Eli Lilly & Co.	11	4,577.04	50,347
Abbott Laboratories	8	4,496.21	35,970
Merck & Co Inc.	16	4,209.99	67,360
Bristol-Meyers Squibb Co.	11	4,152.26	45,675
Novartis	21	3,983.13	83,646
Amgen Inc.	9	3,692.14	33,229

Severin Schwan, the CEO of the Swiss company Roche, reported in 2012 that Roche's research and development costs in 2014 amounted to $8.4 billion, a quarter of the entire National Institutes of Health budget. Given the profit-driven nature of pharmaceutical companies and their research and development expenses, companies use their research and development expenses as a starting point to determine appropriate yet profitable prices.

Pharmaceutical companies spend a large amount on research and development before a drug is released to the market and costs can be further divided into three major fields: the discovery into the drug's specific medical field, clinical trials, and failed drugs.

==== Discovery ====
The process of drug discovery can involve scientists determining the antibodies, viruses, or bacteria that cause a specific disease or illness. The time frame can range from 3–20 years and costs can range between several million to tens of millions of dollars. Research teams attempt to break down disease components to find abnormal events/processes taking place in the body. Only then do scientists work on developing chemical compounds to treat these abnormalities with the aid of computer models.

After "discovery" and a creation of a chemical compound, pharmaceutical companies move forward with the Investigational New Drug (IND) Application from the FDA. After the investigation into the drug and given approval, pharmaceutical companies can move into pre-clinical trials and clinical trials.

==== Trials ====
Drug development and pre-clinical trials focus on non-human subjects and work on animals such as rats.

The Food and Drug Administration requires at least 3 phases of clinical trials that assess the side effects and the effectiveness of the drug. An analysis of trial costs of approved drugs by the FDA from 2015 to 2016 found that out of 138 clinical trials, 59 new therapeutic agents were approved by the FDA. These trials have a median estimated cost of $19 million US dollars.

- Phase 1 lasts several months and aims to assess the safety and dosage of the drug. The purpose is to determine how the drug affects the body.
- Phase 2 lasts several months to two years and aims to assess the efficacy and side effect profile of the drug.
- Phase 3 lasts 1 to 4 years and aims to continue assessing and monitoring the efficacy and side effects of the drug. Phase 3 aims to determine the risks and benefits of a drug to its intended patient population.
- Phase 4 trials occur after the drug is approved by the FDA and aims to continue monitoring safety and efficacy of the drug.

Of these phases, the phase 3 is the most costly process of drug development. A single phase 3 trial can cost upwards of $100 million. It accounts for about 90 percent of the cost to pharmaceutical companies to develop a medication.

==== Failed drugs ====
The processes of "discovery" and clinical trials amounts to approximately 12 years from research lab to the patient, in which about 10% of all drugs that start pre-clinical trials ever make it to actual human testing. Each pharmaceutical company (who have hundreds of drugs moving in and out of these phases) will never recuperate the costs of "failed drugs". Thus, profits made from one drug need to cover the costs of previous "failed drugs". The cost of failure in R&D constitutes about 60% of all development costs. It emphasizes the importance of success rates as a key driver of R&D productivity. The average costs for studies are estimated at $30 million, $70 million, and $310 million for Phase I, II, and III, respectively.

==== Relationship ====
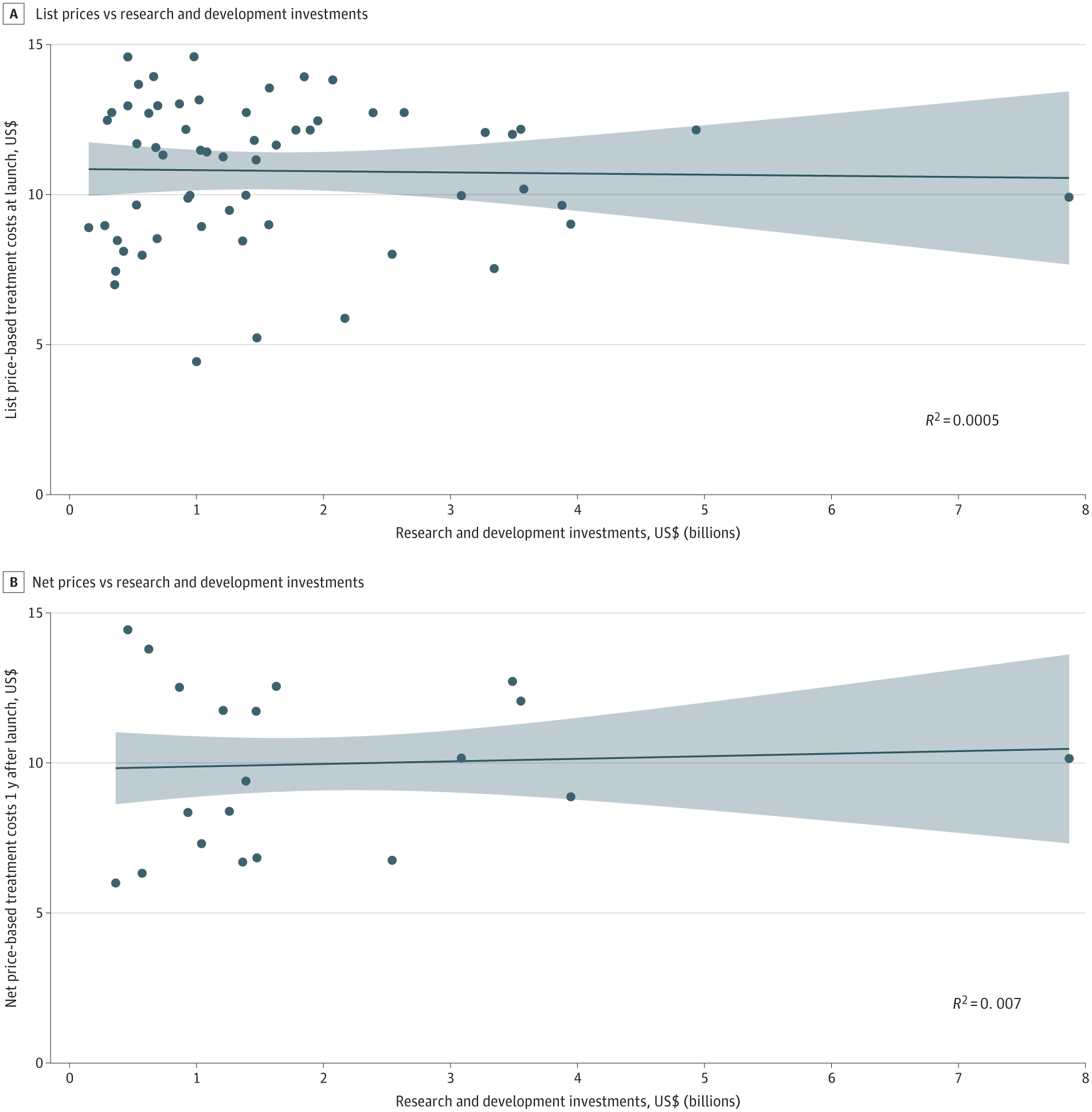
Research and development investments vs log-adjusted treatment costs at launch based on list prices and net prices

Overall, research and development expenses relating to a pharmaceutical drug amount to the billions. For example, it was reported that AstraZeneca spent upwards on average of $11 billion per drug for research and developmental purposes. The average of $11 billion only comprises the "discovery" costs, pre-clinical and clinical trial costs, and other expenses. With the addition of "failed drug" costs, the $11 billion easily amounts to over $20 billion in expenses. Therefore, an appropriate figure like $60 billion would be approximate sales figure that a pharmaceutical company like AstraZeneca would aim to generate to cover these costs and make a profit at the same time.

Total research and development costs provide pharmaceutical companies a ballpark estimation of total expenses. This is important in setting projected profit goals for a particular drug and thus, is one of the most necessary steps pharmaceutical companies take in pricing a particular drug.

A 2022 study invalidated the common argument as is for high medication costs that research and development investments are reflected in and necessitate the treatment costs, finding no correlation for investments in drugs (for cases where transparency was sufficient) and their costs.

=== Stakeholders ===
Patients and doctors can also have some input in pricing, though indirectly. Customers in the United States have been protesting the high prices for recent "miracle" drugs like Daraprim and Harvoni, both of which attempt to cure or treat major diseases (HIV/AIDS and hepatitis C). Public outcry has worked in many cases to control and even decide the pricing for some drugs. For example, there was severe backlash over Daraprim, a drug that treats toxoplasmosis. Turing Pharmaceuticals under the leadership of Martin Shkreli raised the price of the drug 5,500% from $13.50 to $750 per pill. After denouncement from 2016 presidential candidates Hillary Clinton and Bernie Sanders, Martin Shkreli said he would reduce the price but later decided not to.

With the recent trend of price gouging, legislators have introduced reform to curb these hikes, effectively controlling the pricing of drugs in the United States. Hillary Clinton announced a proposal to help patients with chronic and severe health conditions by placing a nationwide monthly cap of $250 on prescription out-of-pocket drugs.

Research for a drug that is curing something no one has ever cured before will cost much more than research for the medicine of a very common disease that has known treatments. Also, there would be more patients for a more common ailment so that prices would be lower. Soliris only treats two extremely rare diseases, so the number of consumers is low, making it an orphan drug. Soliris still makes money because of its high price of over $400,000 per year per patient. The benefit of this drug is immense because it cures very rare diseases that would cost much more money to treat otherwise, which saves insurance companies and health agencies millions of dollars. Hence, insurance companies and health agencies are willing to pay these prices.

=== Public policy ===
Policy makers in some countries have placed controls on the amount pharmaceutical companies can raise the price of drugs. In 2017, Democratic party leaders proposed the creation of a new federal agency to investigate and perhaps fine drug manufacturers who make unjustified price increases. Pharmaceutical companies would be required to submit a justification for a drug with a "significant price increase" within at least 30 days of implementation. Under the terms of the proposal, Mylan's well-publicized price increase for its EpiPen product would fall below the criteria for a significant price increase, while the 5000% overnight increase of Turing Pharmaceuticals Daraprim (pyrimethamine) would be subject to regulatory action.

=== Patents and monopoly rights ===
One of the most important factors that determine the cost of a drug is the availability of competing drugs and treatments. Having two or more manufacturers producing drugs for the same disease tends to reduce costs.

Patent laws give pharmaceutical companies the exclusive right to market a drug for a period of time, allowing them to extract a high monopoly price. For example, U.S. patent law grants a monopoly for 20 years after filing. After that period, the same product from different manufacturers - known as generic drugs - can be sold, usually resulting in a substantial price reduction and possible shift in market share. Two patents that are commonly used are process patents and drug product patents. Process patents only provide developers intellectual claim to the methods in which the product was manufactured, so a competitor can make the same drug by a different method without violating the patent.

In some cases, a new treatment is more effective than an older treatment, or a given drug may work better than competitors for only some patients. The availability of an imperfect substitution erodes prices to a lesser degree than would a perfect substitute.

Some countries grant additional protections from competition for a limited period, such as test data exclusivity or supplementary protection certificates. Additional incentives are available in some jurisdictions for manufacturers of orphan drugs for rare diseases, including extended monopoly protection, tax credits, waived fees, and relaxed approval processes due to the small number of affected patients.

=== Transparency ===
The process of creating drugs to testing them to selling them is a long process. Aside from the costs for research and trials, many consumers are unaware of the process of the drug supply chain. There are many middlemen and companies that buy and sell the drugs. This includes "drug manufacturers, drug wholesalers, pharmacies, and payers." Big Pharma's influence in the policies and regulations regarding drug patents and prescription costs, protects pharmaceutical companies from having to be transparent about where the money goes and who those high prices benefit, including Pharmacy Benefit Managers. Transparency between drug manufacturers and sellers increases accountability between producers and consumers and allows for patients to know more about what they are paying for. Prescription Drug Price Locators allow for patients to learn of more cost-effective sellers and find discounts that will benefit them.

In an effort by the U.S. Department of Health and Human Services (HHS) to regulate drug price transparency in television advertising in 2019, the HHS saw a resistance to change against legislation. Although what the HHS sought to change was a step in the right direction for drug price transparency, Federal Judge Amit P. Mehta ruled in favor of the pharmaceutical industry. The ruling was based on the inability to give the HHS such power to enact such legislations. Policymakers have a lot to take into account when regarding the issue of transparency, as there are many middlemen involved in the selling and buying of prescription drugs.

== Effects on consumers ==
When the price of medicine goes up the quality of life of consumers who need the medicine decreases. Consumers who have increased costs for medicine are more likely to change their lifestyle to spend less money on groceries, entertainment, and routine family needs. They are more likely to go into debt or postpone paying their existing debts. High drug prices can prevent people from saving for retirement. It is not uncommon for typical people to have challenges paying medical bills. Some people fail to get the medical care they need due to lack of money to pay for it. In low and middle income countries up to 90% of people pay for medications out of pocket. A November 2020 study by the West Health Policy Center stated that more than 1.1 million senior citizens in the U.S. Medicare program are expected to die prematurely over the next decade because they will be unable to afford their prescription medications, requiring an additional $17.7 billion to be spent annually on avoidable medical costs due to health complications.

The effects of high prescription costs on consumers also affects their long-term health and overall life expectancy. When properly used, a medication can benefit a patient and cure their disease. When a patient cannot afford to pay for their medication, they lose out on the optimal benefits of proper and adequate dosages. High prescription costs don't just affect patients in the short run, but also deteriorates their overall quality of life, as they are exposed to chronic illnesses that could have been prevented by that first prescription. Evidence from studies indicates that insulin therapy as a treatment for patients with high glucose levels that are not yet diabetic, leads to a decrease in insulin resistance, which benefits patients.

== By region ==
Medication costs per capita by country (2019, OECD)

=== United States ===
Prescription drug prices in the United States have been among the highest in the world. The high cost of prescription drugs became a major topic of discussion in the new millennium, leading up to the U.S. health care reform debate of 2009, and received renewed attention in 2015. High prices have been attributed to monopolies given to manufacturers by the government and a lack of ability for organizations to negotiate prices.

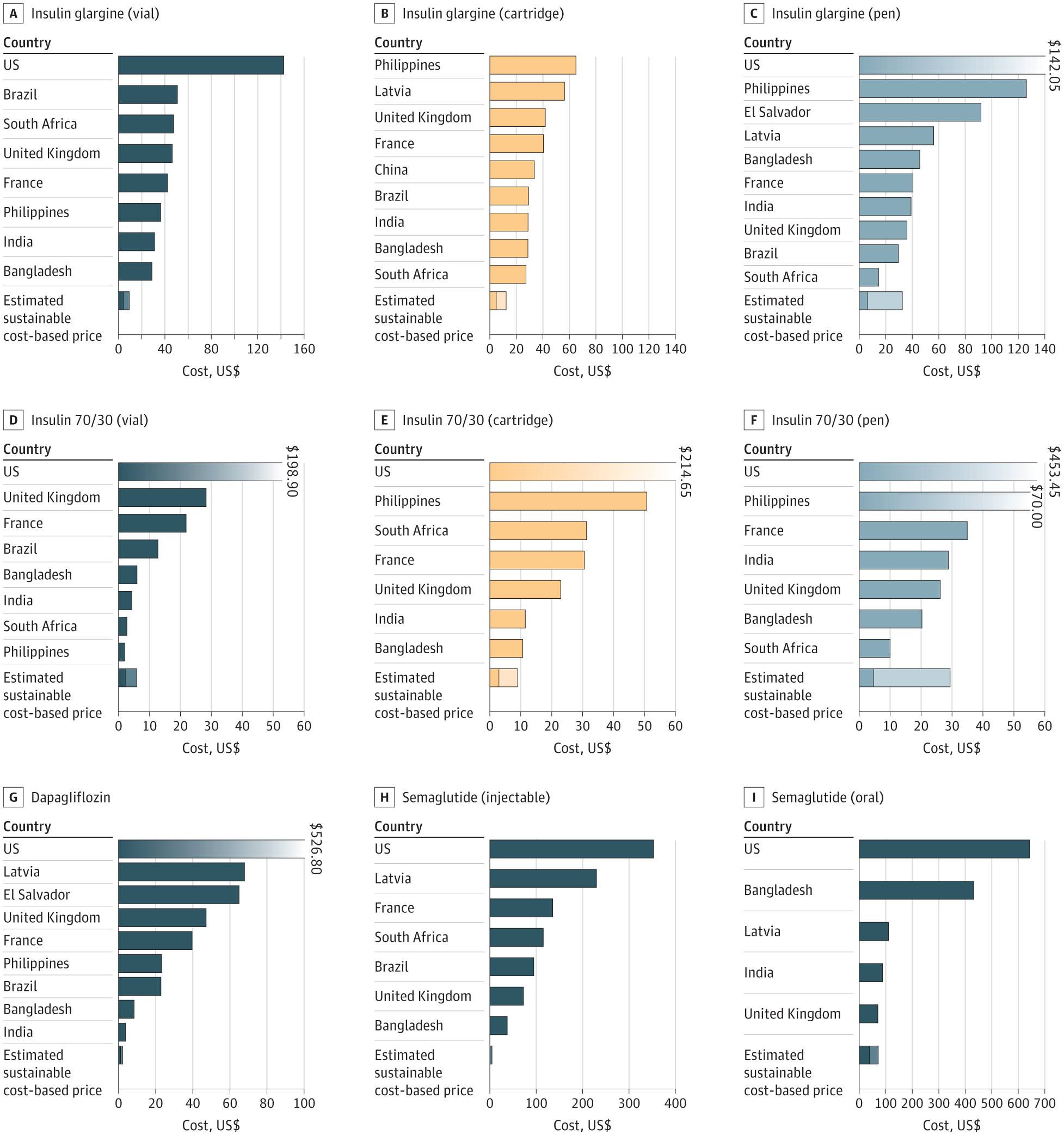
A comparison of lowest prices ($ per month) for diabetes medicines across countries

Individuals are able to enroll in health insurance plans, which often include prescription medication coverage. However, insurance companies decide which drugs they will cover by creating a formulary. If a medication is not on this list, the insurance company may require people to pay more money out-of-pocket compared to other medications that are on the formulary. There are also often tiers within this approved drug list, as the insurance company may be willing to cover a portion of one drug but prefer and completely cover a cheaper alternative.

Medicare Part D is a branch of Medicare that helps to cover costs of prescription medications for patients aged 65 and up. From 2010 to 2018, the Part D plan "nearly quadrupled" its spending on the catastrophic coverage phase. This increase in spending is attributed to the rising pricing of prescription medications.

=== United Kingdom ===
It varies by region in the United Kingdom. In Wales, Scotland and Northern Ireland prescription costs have been completely abolished, however in England the current prescription cost for adults as of 1 April 2024 is £9.90 per item dispensed. There are subsidised costs for those claiming Universal Credit.

=== Canada ===
Canada ranks number three in medication costs in the OECD. The Government of Canada found that during the 2020-2021 year, the country had spent 12.3 billion dollars on medication costs. In Canada, each province and territory publicly funds their own insurance plan rather than a national insurance plan. With differing insurance plans, the medication costs the public varies from area to area.

In Canada, the medication pricing is overseen by the Patented Medicine Prices Review Board (PMPRB), which monitors the prices set for patented drugs. One way the PMPRB evaluates whether drug pricing by patentees is excessive by considering international drug pricing. The PMPRB also compares the price of the drug to a similar market. However, the patentees do not need approval of drug pricing with the PMPRB before listing drugs for sale.

=== Developing world ===
In developing countries medications make up between 25 and 70% of health care costs. Many medications are beyond the reach of the majority of the population. There have been attempts both by international agreements and by pharmaceutical companies to provide drugs at low cost, either supplied by manufacturers who own the drugs, or manufactured locally as generic versions of drugs which are elsewhere protected by patent. Countries without manufacturing capability may import such generics.

The legal framework regarding generic versions of patented drugs is formalised in the Doha Declaration on Trade-Related Aspects of Intellectual Property Rights and later agreements.

== See also ==
- Criticism of patents § Proposed alternatives to the patent system
- Cost of drug development
- Generic drug
- Health policy
- Inverse benefit law
- Pyrimethamine pricing history
- Prescription drug
- Access to medicines
- Access to Medicine Index
- Unitaid
- Examples of drug controversies:
  - Sofosbuvir § Economics
  - Daclatasvir § Economics
  - Epinephrine autoinjector § Price
  - Insulin (medication) § Economics: United States

== Further information ==
- Alexander GC, Casalino LP, Meltzer DO (March 2005). "Physician strategies to reduce patients' out-of-pocket prescription costs". Archives of Internal Medicine. 165 (6): 633–6. doi:10.1001/archinte.165.6.633. PMID 15795338.
- Alexander GC, Tseng CW (May 2004). "Six strategies to identify and assist patients burdened by out-of-pocket prescription costs". Cleveland Clinic Journal of Medicine. 71 (5): 433–7. doi:10.3949/ccjm.71.5.433 (inactive 15 August 2026). PMID 15195778. S2CID 21846191.
- Alexander GC, Casalino LP, Tseng CW, McFadden D, Meltzer DO (August 2004). "Barriers to patient-physician communication about out-of-pocket costs". Journal of General Internal Medicine. 19 (8): 856–60. doi:10.1111/j.1525-1497.2004.30249.x. PMC 1492500. PMID 15242471.
- Pham HH, Alexander GC, O'Malley AS (April 2007). "Physician consideration of patients' out-of-pocket costs in making common clinical decisions". Archives of Internal Medicine. 167 (7): 663–8. doi:10.1001/archinte.167.7.663. PMID 17420424.
- Rabbani A, Alexander GC (May 2008). "Out-of-pocket and total costs of fixed-dose combination antihypertensives and their components". American Journal of Hypertension. 21 (5): 509–13. doi:10.1038/ajh.2008.31. PMID 18437141.
