= Cost of drug development =

Full cost of bringing a new drug to market

The cost of drug development is the full cost of bringing a new drug (i.e., new chemical entity) to market from drug discovery through clinical trials to approval. Typically, companies spend tens to hundreds of millions of U.S. dollars on drug development. One element of the complexity is that the much-publicized final numbers often not only include the out-of-pocket expenses for conducting a series of Phase I-III clinical trials, but also the capital costs of the long period (10 or more years) during which the company must cover out-of-pocket costs for preclinical drug discovery. Additionally, companies often do not report whether a given figure includes the capitalized cost or comprises only out-of-pocket expenses, or both.

One study assessed both capitalized and out-of-pocket costs as about US$1.8 billion and $870 million, respectively.

In an analysis of the drug development costs for 98 companies over a decade, the average cost per drug developed and approved by a single-drug company was $350 million. But for companies that approved between eight and 13 drugs over 10 years, the cost per drug went as high as $5.5 billion.

A new study in 2020 estimated that the median cost of getting a new drug into the market was $985 million, and the average cost was $1.3 billion, which was much lower compared to previous studies, which have placed the average cost of drug development as $2.8 billion.

Alternatives to conventional drug development have the objective for universities, governments and pharmaceutical industry to collaborate and optimize resources.

== Research and development ==
Severin Schwan, the CEO of the Swiss company Roche, reported that Roche's research and development costs amounted to $12.3 billion in 2018, a quarter of the entire National Institutes of Health budget. Given the profit-driven nature of pharmaceutical companies and their research and development expenses, companies use their research and development expenses as a starting point to determine appropriate yet profitable prices.

Pharmaceutical companies spend a large amount on research and development before a drug is released to the market and costs can be further divided into three major fields: the discovery into the drug’s specific medical field, clinical trials, and failed drugs.

=== Discovery ===
Drug discovery is the area of research and development that amounts to the most time and money. The process can involve scientists to determine the germs, viruses, and bacteria that cause a specific disease or illness. The time frame can range from 3–20 years and costs can range between several billion to tens of billions of dollars. Research teams attempt to break down disease components to find abnormal events/processes taking place in the body. Only then do scientists work on developing chemical compounds to treat these abnormalities with the aid of computer models.

After "discovery" and a creation of a chemical compound, pharmaceutical companies move forward with the Investigational New Drug (IND) Application from the FDA. After the investigation into the drug and given approval, pharmaceutical companies can move into pre-clinical trials and clinical trials.

=== Trials ===
Drug development and pre-clinical trials focus on non-human subjects and work on animals such as rats. This is the most inexpensive phase of testing.

The Food and Drug Administration mandates a 3 phase clinical trial testing that tests for side effects and the effectiveness of the drug with a single phase clinical trial costing upwards of $100 million.

After a drug has passed through all three phases, the pharmaceutical company can move forward with a New Drug Application from the FDA. In 2014, the FDA charged between $1 million to $2 million for an NDA.

=== Failed drugs ===
The processes of "discovery" and clinical trials amounts to approximately 12 years from research lab to the patient, in which about 10% of all drugs that start pre-clinical trials ever make it to actual human testing.> Each pharmaceutical company (which have hundreds of drugs moving in and out of these phases) will never recuperate the costs of "failed drugs". Thus, profits made from one drug need to cover the costs of previous "failed drugs".

=== Financial risk ===
Overall, research and development expenses relating to developing drugs amount to billions of dollars. A 2012 study found that research and development of a drug is riskier than product development in other industries because it is lengthy, costly, and highly uncertain, particularly due to unpredictable human physiological responses to drugs. As an example, in 2018, Roche spent $11 billion for research and developmental expenses, and had two failed Phase III trials for an Alzheimer's drug candidate.

== Research on costs ==
Tufts Center for the Study of Drug Development has published numerous studies estimating the cost of developing new pharmaceutical drugs. In 2001, researchers from the Center estimated that the cost of doing so was $802 million, and in 2014, they released a study estimating that this amount had risen to nearly $2.6 billion. The 2014 study was criticized by Medecins Sans Frontieres, which said it was unreliable because the industry's research and development spending is not made public. Aaron Carroll of the New York Times also criticized the study, saying it "contains a lot of assumptions that tend to favor the pharmaceutical industry." The Center's 2016 estimate, published in the Journal of Health Economics, found the cost to have averaged $2.87 billion (in 2013 dollars).

A 2022 study invalidated the common argument as is for high medication costs that research and development investments are reflected in and necessitate the treatment costs, finding no correlation for investments in drugs (for cases where transparency was sufficient) and their costs.
