= Prescribed daily dose =

Usual dose of a medication for a specific condition

Prescribed daily dose (PDD) is the usual dose of medication calculated by looking at a group of prescriptions for the medication in question. At times the PDD needs to be related to the condition being treated.

== See also ==
- Defined daily dose – Statistical measure of drug consumption
