= Bamako Initiative =

1987 African healthcare statement

The Bamako Initiative was a formal statement adopted by African health ministers in 1987 in Bamako, Mali, to implement strategies designed to increase the availability of essential drugs and other healthcare services for Sub-Saharan Africans.

The idea as proposed by UNICEF's executive director, James P. Grant, was for UNICEF and other donors to supply drugs to countries which would be sold a little above cost. The profits from these sales would be used to buy more drugs in a self-sustaining way. By 1988, 20 countries in Sub-Saharan Africa were making plans.

A Health Policy and Planning article by Hardon (1990; 5: 186-189) describes the initiative as follows:

The Bamako Initiative is a joint World Health Organization/ United Nations Children's Fund (WHO/UNICEF) Initiative aimed at solving the problems in the financing of primary health care in sub-Saharan Africa. It was launched in September 1987 at a regional WHO meeting, where Mr Grant, director of UNICEF, dealt with the severe economic crises facing sub-Saharan Africa, the negative effects of adjustment programmes on health, and the reluctance of donors to continue to fund recurrent costs of primary health care programmes. He outlined his vision of how primary health care could be revitalized by generating funds in communities through the sales of drugs at a price considerably higher than cost.

Following this speech, the African ministers of health present at the meeting adopted a resolution in which they called for the acceleration of primary health care by:

- defining and implementing self-financing mechanisms at district level
- equity in providing health services
- encouraging social mobilization and
- ensuring a regular supply of drugs.

Positive experience with revolving drug funds was cited as a reason for the implementation of community financing mechanisms that rely on revenue out of the sales of drugs.

== Measures ==
The Bamako Initiative proposed decentralising health decision making to local levels and establishing realistic national drug policies to enhance the provision of essential drugs for Sub-Saharan Africans.

== Challenges ==
There were several problems with the initiative such as discrimination against the poorest, a national health care dependent on the sale of drugs, and the requirement of foreign currency to import drugs versus an income in local currency. Health Action International an NGO working in health policy started discussion forums around the continent to encourage discussion and address these and other issues with the initiative.
