= International Medical Products Price Guide =

International Medical Products Price Guide, formerly known as International Drug Price Indicator Guide, lists drug price information for WHO Essential Medicines. It is maintained by Management Sciences for Health (MSH) on behalf of the World Health Organization. The guide has been published annually since 1986 with the World Health Organization becoming involved in 2000, though has not been updated since 2015. The prices in the guide are specifically for low and middle income countries (LMIC).

There are two sources of price data in the guide: Buyers and Suppliers. Buyer prices come from a government agency's competitive (domestic or international) bidding or tendering process. The guide includes these for information purpose only and cautions that buyer prices should not be used as an international reference price. Over thirty buyers are included in the guide. Supplier prices come from the procurement agencies of non-governmental organizations, private voluntary organizations, and government health ministries. Some are international while others serve only the domestic market of one country. The prices generally do not include transportation or insurance costs, and an additional handling fees may be charged by some suppliers. The WHO/HAI project recommends an international reference price is taken from the median of supplier prices. The degree to which this price is representative internationally depends on the quantity of suppliers quoting a price for a given product. Over thirty suppliers are included in the guide.

The guide can be used as a source of international reference prices for price surveys. A price survey can compare the local price to this international reference price, and may assess the affordability of treatment in terms of local wages. The WHO/HAI project selects 50 medicines to survey, including 14 global core medicines, 16 regional core medicines and 20 supplementary medicines. When comparing prices, one dosage form and strength is specified for each medicine. To calculate affordability, a typical treatment schedule for a named indication is specified. For example,

- Amitriptyline for depression at 25mg in a tablet/capsule. Treatment costs are for 90 tablets (three times a day for a month).
- Paracetamol for pain/inflammation (paediatric) at 120mg/5ml suspension. Treatment costs are for 45ml (5ml three times a day for three days).

Dividing the median unit local procurement price for each medicine, by the median unit price from international suppliers in the guide, produces the Median Price Ratio (MPR). An MPR of 2 means the local health service is paying twice as much as the international reference price.

The international reference price is not indicative of the price paid by locals for medicine. Generally, in the developing world, the availability of medicines (including essential medicines) through the public health sector is low, requiring individuals to purchase from the private sector. The prices in the private sector are often many times (and can be up to 80 times) the international reference price. This makes treatment unaffordable. The prices in the guide are given in US dollars converted using the exchange rate at the time. Exchange rate fluctuations may cause the wide variations in cost over time.

External reference pricing is the practice of setting drug prices in one country by comparing to a basket of prices from other countries. The basket prices are ideally drawn from countries in the same global region and similar economy. For example, Pakistan uses prices from Bangladesh and India, while Iran uses prices from Greece, Spain, Turkey and the drug country of origin. Drug price data from LMICs can be lacking, and in such situations, international medicine prices can be obtained from the International Medical Products Price Guide. Some countries use ERP for all drug pricing, and some just for new drugs that are on-patent.

In addition to prices, most products in the guide have a defined daily dose (DDD) and ATC code. These are part of a WHO system to help research medicine utilisation. WHO caution that using ATC/DD for purposes other than drug utilisation may be a misuse of that system. The defined daily dose is not a standard therapeutic dose nor necessarily agree with any average prescribed daily dose in practice. While this technical metric could be used, for example, to compare the costs of two formulations of the same drug, WHO state that it should not be used for detailed pricing or therapeutic-class cost comparisons. Both the ACT code and DDD are deliberately stable and if typical therapeutic use of the drug or prescribing practice changes or varies between countries, the codes may not reflect local or current practice.
