= BUKO Pharma-Kampagne =

German pharmaceutical marketing monitor

BUKO Pharma-Kampagne is an independent organization based in Bielefeld, Germany, which watches over the marketing practices of German pharmaceutical companies.

It has gained wider recognition after being described in a bestselling novel, The Constant Gardener by John le Carré. BUKO was mentioned explicitly in the author's afterword as a real counterpart to the novel's fictitious Hippo organisation (also based in Bielefeld, Germany).

BUKO is partially financed by the European Union and mostly by private supporters.

In early 1981 following a conference in Geneva, co-sponsored by the International Organization of Consumers Unions and by BUKO, it set up Health Action International.

== See also ==
- The Constant Gardener – the movie (2005) by Fernando Meirelles
- World Health Organization Research Ethics Review Committee
