= Defined daily dose =

Statistical measure of drug consumption

The defined daily dose (DDD) is a statistical measure of drug consumption, defined by the World Health Organization (WHO) Collaborating Centre for Drug Statistics Methodology. It is defined in combination with the ATC Code drug classification system for grouping related drugs. The DDD enables comparison of drug usage between different drugs in the same group or between different health care environments, or to look at trends in drug utilisation over time. The DDD is not to be confused with the therapeutic dose or prescribed daily dose (PDD), or recorded daily dose (RDD), and will often be different to the dose actually prescribed by a physician for an individual person.

The WHO's definition is: "The DDD is the assumed average maintenance dose per day for a drug used for its main indication in adults." The Defined Daily Dose was first developed in the late 1970s.

== Assignment ==
Before a DDD is assigned by the WHO Collaborating Centre for Drug Statistics Methodology, it must have an ATC Code and be approved for sale in at least one country. The DDD is calculated for a 70kg adult, except if this drug is only ever used in children. The dose is based on recommendations for treatment rather than prevention, except if prevention is the main indication. Generally there is only one DDD for all formulations of a drug, however exceptions are made if some formulations are typically used in significantly different strengths (e.g., antibiotic injection in a hospital vs tablets in the community). The DDD of combination tablets (containing more than one drug) is more complex, most taking into account a "unit dose", though combination tablets used for high blood pressure take the number of doses per day into account.

The formula for determining the dose is:

1. If there is a single recommended maintenance dose in the literature, this is preferred.
2. If there are a range of recommended maintenance doses then
  1. If the literature recommends generally increasing from initial to maximum dose provided it is tolerated, pick the maximum dose.
  2. If the literature recommends only increasing from an initial dose if not sufficiently effective, pick the minimum dose.
  3. If there is no guidance then pick the mid point between the dose range extremes.

The DDD of a drug is reviewed after three years. Ad hoc requests for change may be made but are discouraged and generally not permitted unless the main indication for the drug has changed or the average dose used has changed by more than 50%.

== Limitations ==
The DDD is generally the same for all formulations of a drug, even if some (e.g., flavoured syrup) are designed with children in mind. Some types of drug are not assigned a DDD, for example: medicines applied to the skin, anaesthetics and vaccines. Because the DDD is a calculated value, it is sometimes a "dose" not actually ever prescribed (e.g., a midpoint of two prescribed tablet strengths may not be equal to or be a multiple of any available tablet). Different people may in practice be prescribed higher or lower doses than the DDD, for instance in children, people with liver or kidney impairment, patients with a combination therapy, or due to differences in drug metabolism between individuals or ethnicities (genetic polymorphism).

Although designed primarily for drug utilisation research, data using the DDD can only give a "rough estimate" compared with actually collecting statistics on drug use in practice. The DDD is often use for long term research and analysis of drug utilisation trends over time, so changes to the DDD are avoided if possible, whereas changes in the actual daily dose prescribed for a population may often occur. For example, the Recorded Daily Dose (RDD) of simvastatin in Canada in 1997 was only 8% different to the DDD, but by 2006 it was 67% different. In 2009, the DDD of several statins were updated, with simvastatin changing from 15mg to 30mg.

The DDD is based on the maintenance dose, but in practice patients in a population will be on a mix of initial and maintenance doses.

== Use and misuse ==
The DDD can be used as the basis for calculating various indicators of drug utilisation. The indicator DDD per 1000 inhabitants per day can suggest what portion of a population are regularly using a drug or class of drugs. The indicator DDD per 100 bed days estimates on average how many inpatients are given a drug every day in hospital. The indicator DDDs per inhabitant per year can be used for drugs normally prescribed for short treatment duration (e.g., antibiotics) to indicate the average number of days in a year a person may take that treatment. The extent to which estimates using DDD reflect actual clinical practice depends on how close the DDD is to the typical prescribed dose in that country or setting and at that point in history.

Because the primary purpose of the ATC/DDD system is drug consumption measurement, the WHO recommend caution when considering its use for cost analysis: "DDDs, if used with caution can be used to compare, for example, the costs of two formulations of the same drug." So, the cost per DDD of an extended-release tablet taken once a day compared with a standard tablet taken twice a day, may indicate the extended-release tablet costs much more to treat the same condition.

In contrast, using DDD to compare the cost of different drugs or drug groups is "usually not valid" according to the WHO. They recommend that "DDDs are not suitable for comparing drugs for specific, detailed pricing, reimbursement and cost-containment decisions". The DDD may not necessarily compare well with the actual prescribed daily dose, and two drugs in the same ATC group may not be equally effective at their Daily Defined Dose.

For example, an analysis of statin use in the Ontario Drug Benefit Program, 2006-07. The average cost per DDD of rosuvastatin was 21% more expensive than atorvastatin ($1.14 compared to $0.94), which would suggest the shift at the time from prescribing atorvastatin to prescribing rosuvastatin would result in increased costs to the healthcare budget. Both had a DDD at that time of 10mg, but 10mg was not the only dose prescribed. For example, atorvastatin once daily at 10mg, 20mg, 40mg and 80mg was prescribed 45%, 36%, 16% and 3% of the time respectively. If one compared cost per unit (daily tablet) then rosuvastatin was instead 24% cheaper than atorvastatin ($1.44 vs $1.90), and if one compares cost per RDD (recorded daily dose) then rosuvastatin was 26% cheaper than atorvastatin ($1.43 vs $1.93). An erroneous conclusion of a healthcare budget cost increase arises in this case from using cost per DDD. At the time, the RDD of rosuvastatin was similar to its DDD (12.6 mg vs 10mg), but the RDD of atorvastatin was twice its DDD (20.6 mg vs 10mg). The DDD of atorvastatin was revised in 2009 to 20mg.

The Canadian Patented Medicine Prices Review Board analysed the use of DDD for drug utilisation and cost analysis and offered recommendations. They particularly concentrated on the problems that occur when the Recorded Daily Dose (RDD) observed in the population deviates more than minimally from the Defined Daily Dose. They conclude that the DDD methodology "should generally not be used to interpret Canadian drug utilization; should generally not be applied in cost analyses; and should generally not be applied in policy decisions". The Board recommend that provided the agreement between DDD and RDD is known and minimal, then a cost per DDD "can provide a rough idea of the treatment cost" but "caution should still be used, as misinterpretation of the results based on the DDD methodology may still occur". If the agreement between DDD and RDD is unknown or a significant disagreement is known, then the DDD methodology "should not be used in cost analyses". In all cases, the Board state "The DDD methodology should not be used in guiding policy decisions regarding reimbursement, therapeutic substitution and other pricing decisions".

== Example ==
If the DDD for a certain drug is given, the number of DDDs used by an individual patient or (more commonly) by a collective of patients is as follows.

$Drug\ usage\ (in\ DDDs) = \frac{Items\ issued \times Amount\ of\ drug\ per\ item}{DDD}$

For example, the analgesic (pain reliever) paracetamol has a DDD of 3 g, which means that an average patient who takes paracetamol for its main indication, which is pain relief, uses 3 grams per day. This is equivalent to six standard tablets of 500 mg each. If a patient consumes 24 such tablets (12 g of paracetamol in total) over a certain span of time, this equals a consumption of four DDDs.

$Drug\ usage\ (in\ DDDs) = \frac{24\ (items) \times 500\ (mg/item)}{3000\ mg} = 4$

== See also ==
- Anatomical Therapeutic Chemical Classification System – Drug classification system
- Average daily quantity (ADQ), an alternative in England
- Prescribed daily dose – Usual dose of a medication for a specific condition
