= Women Deliver =

Global advocacy organization

Women Deliver is a global advocacy organization focused on improving maternal health. The organization is based in New York, and its work covers a number of areas including access to a healthy diet, clean water and sanitation, health services, and appropriate education during pregnancy and childbirth. It is targeted towards reducing maternal mortality and increased recognition of reproductive health rights.

== History ==
Women Deliver was founded by Jill Sheffield, and launched at the Women Deliver conference in London in October 2007. Subsequent conferences were hosted by the organization in Washington, D.C. (7-9 June 2010), Kuala Lumpur (28-30 May 2013), Copenhagen (16-19 May 2016), Vancouver (2-6 June 2019), and Kigali (17-20 July 2023).

In 2020 the organization issued a public apology after some staff spoke out about a culture of racism; they also launched an internal investigation into accusations of white savior complex, 'white faux feminism' and toxic cliquish behavior. The investigation was completed four months later, finding that no one single person was responsible for the "challenging" environment. One staff member called this a "slap in the face" to junior and mid-level staff, and Katja Iversen resigned as president of the group. Women Deliver issued a statement committing to changing the working environment.
