= Abductor digiti minimi =

Abductor digiti minimi (or Abductor digiti quinti) may refer to:

- Abductor digiti minimi muscle of the hand
- Abductor digiti minimi muscle of foot
