= Average daily quantity =

Average daily quantity (ADQ) is similar to the World Health Organization's defined daily dose, but is adjusted to reflect how medications are used in England.
