= Access to Medicine Index =

Pharmaceutical company ranking

The Access to Medicine Index is a ranking system published biennially since 2008 by the Access to Medicine Foundation, an international not-for-profit organisation based in Amsterdam, the Netherlands. It ranks 20 of the world's largest pharmaceutical companies according to their ability to make their pharmaceutical drugs more available, affordable and accessible in low- and middle-income countries. The Index aims to stimulate companies to improve access in developing countries, to show the activities of their peers, and allow them, governments, investors, civil society, patient organisations and academia to understand how pharmaceutical companies can make further progress. The 2026 Access to Medicine Index was funded by the Dutch Ministry of Foreign Affairs, the UK Foreign, Commonwealth and Development Office, the Gates Foundation, the Leona M. and Harry B. Helmsley Charitable Trust and the Wellcome Trust.

== Ranking ==
The latest Access to Medicine Index, published in November 2026, ranked the 20 pharmaceutical companies as follows:

Company name (2026 score)	2026 ranking	2024 ranking	2022 ranking	2021 ranking	2018 ranking
Novartis AG (3.86)	1	1	4	2	11
GSK plc (3.73)	2	2	1	1	1
AstraZeneca plc. (3.28)	3	5	3	7	3
Sanofi (3.17)	4	3	8	5	4
Bayer AG (3.15)	5	10	9	13	10
Boehringer Ingelheim (3.11)	6	8	13	12	16
Roche Holding AG (3.11)	6	11	10	9	6
Pfizer Inc (2.96)	8	4	6	4	5
Merck KGaA (2.81)	9	7	5	8	7
Takeda Pharmaceutical Co. Ltd (2.72)	10	9	7	6	9
Novo Nordisk A/S (2.67)	11	12	11	10	8
Bristol Myers Squibb (2.34)	12	13	15	19	13
Johnson & Johnson (2.26)	13	5	2	3	2
Eisai Co. Ltd (2.25)	14	14	12	11	14
Merck & Co. Inc (2.14)	15	16	18	15	17
Gilead Sciences (2.03)	16	16	14	14	19
Astellas Pharma Inc (1.67)	17	15	16	14	12
Eli Lilly & Co (1.66)	18	19	20	18	15
Daiichi Sankyo Co. Ltd (1.65)	19	18	17	16	18
AbbVie Inc (1.29)	20	20	19	17	20

== History ==
The Access to Medicine Index was developed starting in 2004 on the initiative of Dutch entrepreneur Wim Leereveld. After years of working with the pharmaceutical industry, he concluded that simply "naming and shaming" the industry did not do enough to encourage pharmaceutical companies to play their part in improving access to medicine in the developing world. Leereveld noticed that there were many different (and sometimes conflicting) opinions about what the pharmaceutical industry should be doing with regard to access to medicine, but that there was no tool to recognise good practice within the pharmaceutical industry and no framework for collective dialogue surrounding this issue. He set out to develop a ranking system that would show which pharmaceutical companies do the most to improve access to medicine and how, and also help stakeholders to collectively define companies' role in increasing access to medicine.

The first Access to Medicine Index was published in 2008, followed by new Indexes in 2010, 2012, 2014, 2016, 2018, 2021, 2022, 2024 and 2026.

== Methodology ==
The methodology for the Access to Medicine Index is reviewed every two years, ahead of each analysis. The methodology for the 2026 Index was published in October 2025, ahead of the Index's release in November 2026.

The Access to Medicine Index uses a weighted analysis to capture and compare data which the companies provide, as well as publicly available data. The 2026 framework comprise 29 indicators across three areas of focus called "Technical Areas", which cover the range of company business activities considered relevant to access to medicine: Governance of Access (15% of the overall score), Research and Development (30%) and Product Delivery (55%).

The methodology for the 2024 Index introduced a greater focus on 'patient reach'. Jayasree K. Iyer, CEO of the Foundation, said this was settled on "after engaging with various stakeholders, from the World Health Organisation to patient organisations, NGOs, governments, and investors to arrive at a multi-stakeholder consensus."

The 2026 methodology refined the patient reach indicator to assess systematic measurement across companies' full product portfolios and countries of supply, public disclosure of measurements methods, clear measurable and time-bound goals for their portfolios, and public reporting of disaggregated patient reach data at least annually.

== Scope ==
Company scope

The Access to Medicine Index ranks 20 of the world's largest originator (research-based) pharmaceutical companies, based on market capitalisation and the relevance of their product portfolios to diseases in the developing world. One unlisted company, Boehringer Ingelheim, is also included since it meets the size and portfolio relevance criteria.

In 2008 and 2010, the first two editions of the Access to Medicine Index, companies engaged exclusively in the production of generic drugs were also assessed. Based on feedback from the 2011 stakeholder consultations, these companies were excluded from the 2012 Index and subsequent iterations. The Access to Medicine Foundation stated that it recognised that these companies play a significant role in access to medicine, particularly in low- and middle-income countries. In 2023, the Access to Medicine Foundation launched a dedicated Generic & Biosimilar Medicines Programme, with its own analytical framework.

Geographic scope

The Access to Medicine Index focuses on low- and middle-income countries, based on World Bank and United Nations classifications measuring economic advancement, human development, and relative levels of inequality. The 2024 Index measured developments in a total of 113 countries, including countries considered to be low income and lower-middle income countries by the World Bank, and Least Developed Countries as defined by the United Nations Economic and Social Council. In addition, countries classified as low human development countries and medium human development countries by the UN Human Development Index are included. Finally, based on the UN Inequality-Adjusted Human Development Index, the index includes countries which, while they may have higher measures of development, have comparatively high levels of socio-economic inequality.

Disease scope

The Access to Medicine Index covers a range of diseases based on their aggregate global disease burden and their relevance to pharmaceutical interventions, in accordance with non-age-weighted WHO Disability Adjusted Life Years (DALY) data. In the 2024 Index, the disease scope included 81 diseases, conditions and pathogens identified as the most critical priorities regarding access to medicine.

Product type scope

To reflect the range of available product types for prevention, diagnosis and treatment of diseases, the Index maintains a broad product type scope which draws closely from definitions provided by the G-Finder Report.

== Reception ==
The Access to Medicine Index has become a frequently cited benchmark for pharmaceutical companies with regard to their access to medicine initiatives. In addition to global media outlets reporting on the Access to Medicine Index and its findings, significant coverage includes:

- In July 2008, Bill Gates mentioned the Access to Medicine Index in an interview with Time magazine as an example of an incentive that works to give businesses credit for what they are already doing to address the challenges of access to medicine in developing countries.
- In 2010 Paul Hunt, the former UN special rapporteur on the right to health, described the Index as a way to measure the pharmaceutical industry's progress in line with human rights obligations.
- A 2010 UBS report called the Index a tool for investors to assess access to medicine specifically and, where necessary, separately from corporate social responsibility frameworks. The Index has received significant attention from investors globally, including in Japan, the UK, Sweden, and Australia.
- The Access to Medicine Index has been repeatedly cited in scientific journals such as the British Medical Journal, The Lancet, The Pharmaceutical Journal and The New England Journal of Medicine.
- Data from the 2014 Index was used in a study of access to hepatitis C medicines in the Bulletin of the World Health Organization.
- In February 2021, Dag-Inge Ulstein and John-Arne Røttingen, who at the time were Norway's Minister of International Development and Global Health Ambassador respectively, co-wrote an article about urgent actions needed by pharmaceutical companies one year into the coronavirus pandemic, in which they referred to "the new results of the 2021 Access to Medicine Index which point towards best practices and concrete examples of actions that could be applied to help ensure new life-saving vaccines and therapeutics reach low and middle-income countries (LMICs) before it is too late."

== Criticism ==
The results of the Access to Medicine Index are largely based on company data provided by the pharmaceutical companies themselves. Self-reported data does carry with it an inherent risk, but the Access to Medicine Index also uses dependable external sources to verify data provided by the companies wherever possible. Additionally, it is in companies' best interest to be as forthcoming as possible, as they are a) rated by the index on their degree of transparency and b) rated on their performance every two years, so that failures to meet their commitments and/or inconsistencies over time are likely to be uncovered. Besides, as drug access is only one dimension of the Corporate Social Responsibility (CSR) within the pharmaceutical industry, it would not be reasonable to evaluate the CSR practices of pharmaceutical companies only using this index.
