= Sankalp Rehabilitation Trust =

- Founded: 1995
- Founder: Eldred Tellis
- Type: Community Service
- Location: Mumbai, India
- Website: http://www.sankalp.org.in/

Sankalp Rehabilitation Trust is a Mumbai-based NGO that works with the injecting drug using community since 1995, preventing HIV/AIDS through education and needle-exchange programme & disposals. Using a harm reduction approach, they provide services such as abscess management, basic medical care, counseling, and opioid substitution therapy to their clients. In 2008, Sankalp received the Red Ribbon Award from UNAIDS for their efforts.

The majority of clients are street-based, have insufficient social support, and very little education or training for social reintegration. This NGO runs Drop-in Centres in Mumbai Central, Kurla, Kalyan, and Bhiwandi as well as a Community Care Centre at Charni Road for people in critical need and a therapeutic community at Arthur Road Jail.

== Drop-in Centres ==
Some specific activities of the Drop-in Centres include:

- Daily medical clinic, nutrition support, referrals to hospitals
- Opioid substitution therapy programmes with Buprenorphine
- Conduct needle/syringe exchange and condom distribution
- Provide individual and group counseling, ex. confidence, depression, etc.
- Ambulance provides client transportation for needed services
- Participation in community clean ups, neighborhood rallies, and skills training programmes

== Project Hunar ==
In May 2009, Sankalp launched a partnership with Bangalore based NGO AMBA CEEIC geared at providing sustainable livelihood training to a group of recovering clients. "Project Hunar" offer its residential clients introductory computer instruction through a visual recognition approach and help in developing professional skills, participation in educational sessions, and assistance finding group work in the data entry sector.

== History of Financial Support and Partnerships ==
Funders: European Commission, Deutscher Orden International, UNESCO, UNODC, American Jewish World Service, Mumbai District AIDS Control Society, Maharashtra State AIDS Control Society, AVERT Society, Annika Linden Foundation, 1000 Club Members, and the Inner Wheel Club of Bombay North

Partners: Brihanmumbai Municipal Corporation, Lawyers Collective, Narcotics Control Bureau, Sharan, TTK Hospital, & AMBA CEEIC
