= External reference pricing =

Drug pricing method

External reference pricing (ERP), also known as international reference pricing, is the practice of regulating the price of a medication in one country, by comparing with the price in a "basket" of other reference countries. It contrasts with internal reference pricing, where the price of one drug is compared to the domestic price of therapeutically related drugs, and with cost-plus pricing, where the price involves negotiating an acceptable markup to the unit cost to develop and produce.

== Policy-making ==
For using ERP in medicine cost regulation policies, the Euripid collaboration recommends the following 12 key principles:

1. ERP is an important tool but should not be used as the sole criterion, but rather in a mix with other instruments.
2. ERP should compare single specific products rather than based on indices.
3. The reference countries basket should be chosen in accordance with the aim of the national pharmaceutical policy.
4. Evidence has shown that ERP is most effective when applied to pharmaceuticals without generic or therapeutic competition.
5. Price comparison should be done on the first price in the pharmaceutical distribution chain.
6. When pharmaceuticals are considered as comparable, competent authorities should describe clear and transparent procedures.
7. Pricing formula applied for ERP should reflect the national pricing policy objective.
8. ERP procedures should be done with the highest possible accuracy and completeness of data sources.
9. If price information is adjusted to national requirements, it should be done transparently and in a sustainable manner.
10. ERP activities should be carefully planned and be considered as a policy tool for price revisions and monitoring.
11. The procedures and price inputs to ERP should be transparent to ensure predictability and effectiveness.
12. Policy-makers should consider strengthening their cooperation, in particular through the contribution and benefits of existing policies.

== Human rights ==
Access to needed essential medicines is an international human right, also named the "right to health", as stated by the United Nations and the WHO. In 2001, the World Health Assembly passed the resolution No. 54.11 that called for exploring the feasibility and effectiveness of implementing systems to ensure medicines affordability and availability. The WHO/HAI methodology and database is one of the projects that were created in response, along with the WHO recommending the implementation of centralized price sharing systems and the implementation of pharmaceutical price cost-containment policies.

== Medication cost policies ==
Medicines pricing policies are defined as "regulations and processes used by government authorities to set the price of a medicine as part of exercising price control". ERP is a mechanism for price control, or cost-containment policy. A quarter of all health expenditures globally is on medicines. However, authorities may want to control other components than price, such as prescription volumes.

ERP is a widely accepted tool to design cost-containment policies, used in the European Union, Brazil, Jordan, South Africa, Canada, and Australia. This is used as the main drug pricing strategy in 23 of 27 European countries in 2019. In 2010, 20 members out of 27 in the European Union and 24 countries in the OCDE were using it. For this usage, each country usually has a legal framework to define the calculation of ERP and selection of reference products, with variations across high-income countries (e.g., using the median price or instead the lowest price across the reference countries), but the majority use ex-factory prices. A basket prices are ideally drawn from countries in the same global region and similar economy. For example, Pakistan uses prices from Bangladesh and India, while Iran uses prices from Greece, Spain, Turkey and the drug country of origin. However pricing data from LMICs can be lacking, and in such situations, international medicine prices can be obtained from the International Medical Products Price Guide. The United Kingdom has a critical role in the ERP system, as it is often used as a reference country since medication prices are often low, although it is not using ERP itself.

The WHO recommend in the Guideline on Country Pharmaceutical Pricing Policies that countries "use a combination of different pharmaceutical pricing policies that should be selected on the objective, context and health system". As of 2019 ERP superseded or completed older cost-containment strategies such as cost-plus or internal reference pricing.

=== High-income countries ===
Total expenditure on pharmaceuticals in OECD countries in 2018 or latest available, in US dollars per capita. European union is the average over the 28 member countries in 2018. Countries using ERP such as european countries generally have lower pharmaceuticals expenditures, and the United States, where drug prices are not directly regulated, the highest.

European countries saw a 76% rise in pharmaceutical outpatient expenditure between 2000 and 2009. Furthermore, the 2008 financial crisis added to the financial pressure, which prompted most European countries to consider health expenditures as a major target for healthcare cost reduction. European countries that were affected by the 2008 financial crisis reported restricted access to essential medicines.

ERP is one of the major mechanism used by these countries for this purpose, along others such as direct price control (i.e., fixed maximum prices), profit ceiling, internal reference pricing and free pricing. ERP is most commonly used by high-income countries to control the prices of patented medicines, or with other intellectual property rights such as pricing monopolies, for therapeutic agents that are state-reimbursed. European Union countries started building medicine prices databases since the 1990s, which led to the creation of Hungary's Common European Drug Database in 2008 and its successor Euripid since 2009, a database with standardly formatted data on drug prices and pricing regulations, fed with data from participating countries who are the only ones who can access the data in return, and is used as a shared and centralized ERP system. Japan is an exception, using ERP to systematically adjust local prices within a range of the ERP according to a formula.

Drug prices are reevaluated regularly in European countries, ranging from 3 months in Greece, to 5 years in France.

Few studies have investigated the impact of ERP on high-income countries, but two studies conducted in countries both inside and outside of the European Union found no substantial decrease or increase in drug prices. Furthermore, with the widespread adoption of ERP, pharmaceutical manufacturers are developing counter strategies to limit the negative impacts on them, such as reduced drug prices. One strategy is to delay the launch of new drug products into the market, as is the case with Belgium, being usually not among the countries with the highest drug prices in the European Union. This increase in the launch delay of new medicines is however observed to some extent in all European countries implementing ERP. Another observed strategy in Germany and New Zealand is to deliberately keep the prices of some medicines high, knowing these countries would later be used as reference countries to derive higher external reference prices. These counter strategies raise the question of the sustainability of ERP as an objective measure.

In several European countries, implementing ERP led to a decrease of the average drug price, but not the maximum nor minimum drug prices. Since the ERP was the sole criterion for drug pricing in these countries, the observed decrease can only be due to ERP implementation. It was also observed that prices decreases was correlated with the frequency of price revision, with countries infrequently revising prices having flat prices, whereas those with frequent revising saw a regular price decline over time. The median drug price decrease observed at 10 years was approximately 15%.

A report for the European Commission simulated various ERP use strategies for drug price regulation, and found that frequent price revisions, iterative price cuts, having a large number of countries in the basket, price calculation methods, the impact of generics and prices' sources were the most influent parameters on the drug prices evolution over time for countries using ERP as their main criterion for drug price regulation. Although it is conceptually inadequate to use ERP for drug price regulation instead of as a benchmark measure, this report concludes that ERP can be a "very effective tool", especially when several of the aforementioned strategies are combined.

In the United States, medicines prices, which are not directly regulated by any cost-containment policy ("free pricing"), continually rank among the highest in the world. There are political discussions As of 2019 to implement ERP in the United States.

=== Low and moderate-income countries ===
High medicine price and availability are the two crucial obstacles preventing one-third of the global population, or about two billion people, mainly in low and moderate-income countries (LMICs, as defined by the World Bank), from accessing needed medication. There is evidence that medicine prices are not correlated to income differences between countries, with essential medicines being higher priced in low income countries than in high income countries due to retail markups.

Whereas European Union and OCDE countries have put in place shared regulated medication cost-containment systems, low and moderate-income countries did not and lack health-care information systems to help in policy decision making, which worsened their situation as "price acceptors". Indeed, their out-of-pocked expenditure increased, with 61% to 77% (per capita) of total pharmaceutical expenditure being paid by individuals out of their pocket with no state-reimbursement. Pharmaceuticals expenditures also account for an important share of all expenditure on health, particularly in low-income countries with a mean of 30.4% in 2006 compared to 19.7% in high-income countries. Furthermore, medicines prices are usually high, particularly in the private sector and up to 80 times the price in high-income countries; availability can be low, particularly in the public sector; treatments are often unaffordable, requiring 15 days of wage to buy a 30 days treatment; government procurement can be inefficient by buying expensive original medication as well as cheaper generics; and numerous taxes and duties are being applied to medicines, including essential ones. These issues were observed in China, an upper-middle-income economy, with its bribery scandals involving GlaxoSmithKline and Sanofi.

However, inspired by the use of ERP by high-income countries and the lesser technical and analytical requirements to implement ERP compared to other price control mechanisms such as cost-plus or pharmacoeconomic analysis, LMICs are increasingly following suit, by using ERP in combination with other methods of cost control (cost plus, internal reference pricing, profit controls, economic evaluation, direct fixation).

Similarly to high-income countries, there is only limited evidence as to the impact of ERP in LMICs. However, some countries such as Turkey and Indonesia saw a decrease in drug prices following the implementation of ERP, although there is no objectively direct evidence this decrease was caused by the introduction of ERP.

As of 2017, a systematic review found that markup regulation and ERP are the most commonly implemented drug pricing policies in LMICs, followed by cost-plus and the use of generics.

Another review found limited evidence that implementing ERP had the effect of narrowing down the prices, by lowering drug prices in high-price countries and raising them in low-price countries. Hence, it is suggested that optimal ERP implementations are dependent on a clear set of requirements and calculation in full transparency, and that ERP should not be used as the sole pricing mechanism but rather as one benchmark for pricing decisions.

=== Internal reference pricing ===
ERP differs from internal reference pricing, or therapeutic reference pricing, where the price of a medication is compared against other domestic drugs that are its therapeutic equivalents, based on a given ATC level. This sets a reference price for a class of equivalent or similar therapeutic agents, the rest being paid out-of-pocket by the patient. Hence, a prerequisite of internal reference pricing is the availability of comparable medicines, which usually implies this can be implemented only after patents expiry and when generic or biosimilar medicines enter the market.

Internal reference pricing may reduce expenditures in the short term by incentivizing people to use the reference drugs at the reference price, but the effect on drugs with a higher price than reference and on health is uncertain. Some countries, such as Denmark which has a long history of using ERP, switched to internal reference pricing. In 2016, out of 42 surveyed countries including WHO European countries, Canada and South Africa, 30 reported having internal reference pricing between generics, but only 15 also applied this policy to biosimilar medicines.
