= Management Sciences for Health =

Nonprofit

Management Sciences For Health Inc
- Formation: Tax-exempt since January 1973; 53 years ago
- Type: 501(c)(3)
- Tax ID no.: EIN: 42482188
- President and Chief Executive Officer: Marian Wentworth
- Revenue: 168,843,246 USD (2024)
- Expenses: 166,912,191 USD (2024)
- Website: msh.org

Management Sciences for Health (MSH) is a global nonprofit organization based in Arlington, Virginia that provides governments, health organizations, and the private sector with strategies, tools, and management support to deliver high-functioning health systems. According to the organization’s website, since its founding in 1971, MSH has worked in more than 150 countries.

== History ==
MSH was founded in 1971 by Dr. Ronald O’Connor, who was inspired by a trip to visit a mission hospital in Nepal while he was in medical school. O’Connor credits Dr. Noboru Iwamura, a Japanese doctor working at the hospital, with introducing him to the Tao of Leadership and teaching him an approach that emphasized reaching out to communities and showing villagers how they could organize to promote their own health, using the hospital as a last resort. O’Connor wanted to replicate, on an expanded scale, Iwamura’s methods of working with the community. He has said he founded MSH in an effort to embody those values and provide support for community leaders struggling with public health problems in countries around the world.

MSH initially supported family planning management with a first long-term project in South Korea, funded by USAID. In 1973, the organization began work in Afghanistan to strengthen family planning and health services in rural regions. The focus expanded into other areas, based on the interests and requests of local organizations and ministries of health.

== Activities ==
Working with local and country-based partners, MSH's projects address strengthening health system foundations and key global health challenges with a goal of achieving universal and equitable health services for all. Their approach looks at multiple elements including the political economy, the availability of resources, local culture and regulations, and the impact of other sectors such as agriculture and education. Their ‘systems thinking’ analyzes these connections to generate evidence for decisions. They emphasize multisectoral partnerships.

Some of MSH’s priority focus areas include Pharmaceutical System Strengthening; Leadership, Management, and Governance; Health Financing and Health Technology Assessment; Maternal and Child Health; Decentralizing Health Systems; and projects addressing specific health conditions such as HIV/AIDS, malaria, and tuberculosis, as well as noncommunicable diseases.

MSH works in more than 36 countries, largely in Africa. Examples of projects include a 2013 partnership with the Ponseti International Association to increase low-cost, noninvasive treatment of clubfoot for children in Nigeria, Pakistan and Peru.

MSH has published several tools and resources including Managing Drug Supply (MDS), the International Medical Products Price Guide, Managers Who Lead: A Handbook for Improving Health Services, the Primary Health Care Costing, Analysis, and Planning (PHC-CAP) Tool, the Organizational Capacity Assessment Tool (OCAT), QuanTB, and RxSolution.

According to the organization’s website, MSH’s donors include governments and international agencies, such as the United States Agency for International Development (USAID), the US Centers for Disease Control and Prevention (CDC), World Health Organization (WHO), the Global Fund to Fight AIDS, Malaria and Tuberculosis; foundations and corporations, including the Bill & Melinda Gates Foundation, Margaret A. Cargill Philanthropies, John D. and Catherine T. MacArthur Foundation, The James M. & Cathleen D. Stone Foundation, Novartis, Merck, Pfizer, Roche; and individuals.
