= Medication =

Substance used to diagnose, cure, treat, or prevent disease

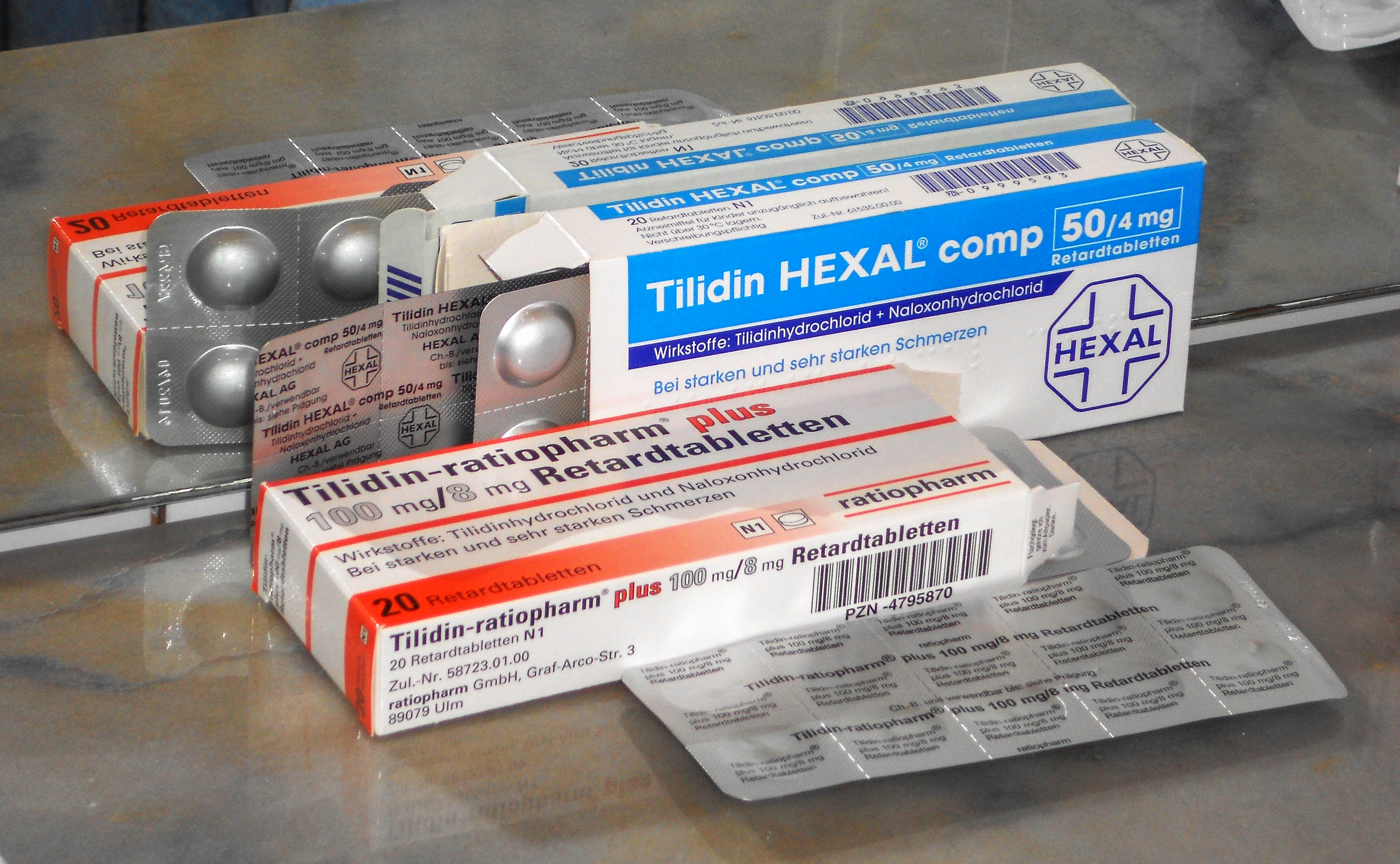
- Packages of medication (tilidin)
- Other names: Medicine, drug, pharmaceutical, pharmaceutical preparation, pharmaceutical product, medicinal product, medicament, remedy, meds

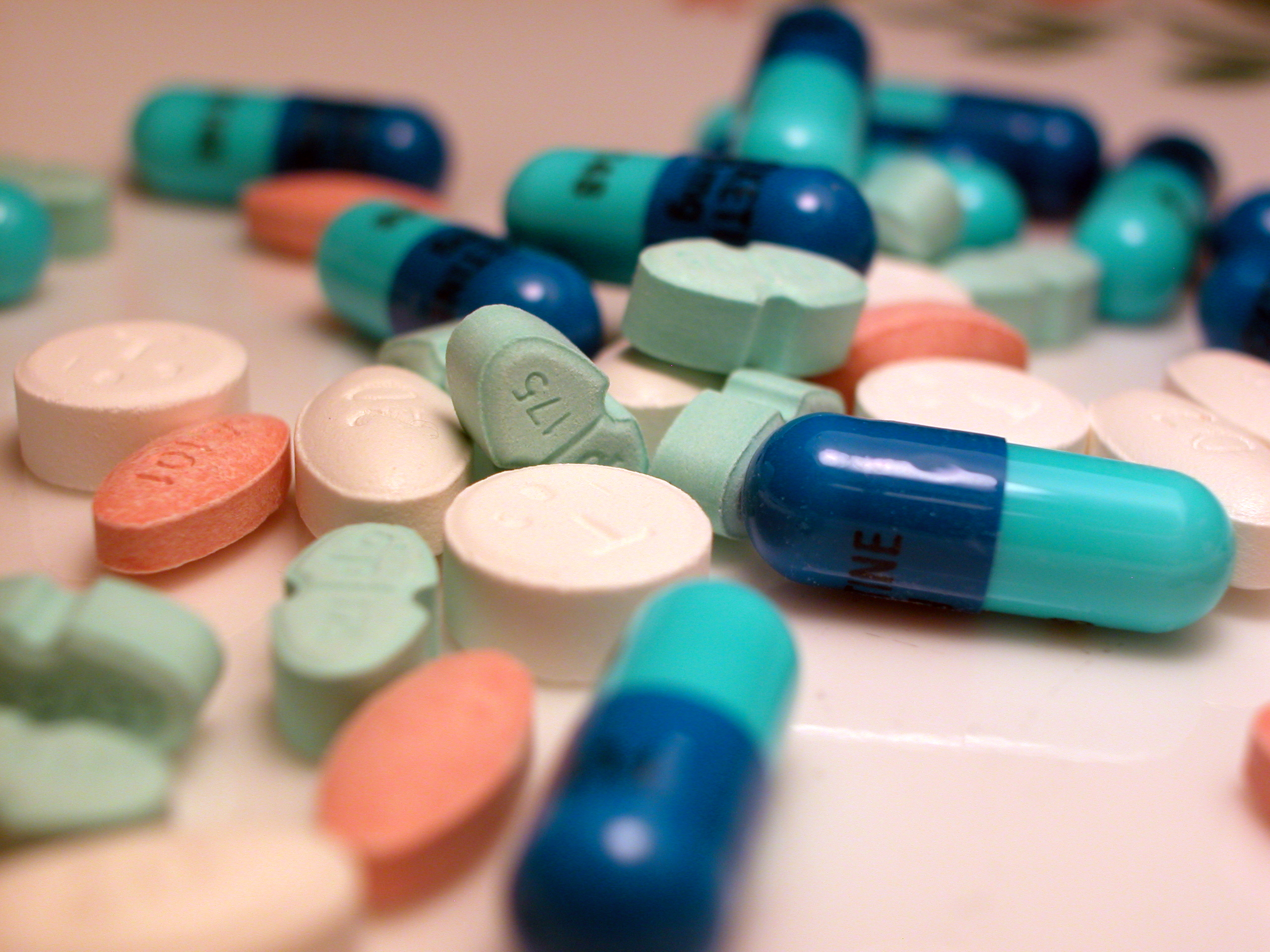
An example of a medication is a prescription drug.

Medication (also called medicament, medicine, pharmaceutical drug, medicinal product, medicinal drug, or simply drug) is a drug used to diagnose, cure, treat, or prevent disease. Drug therapy (pharmacotherapy) is an important part of the medical field and relies on the science of pharmacology for continual advancement and on pharmacy for all forms of management.

Drugs are classified in many ways. One of the key divisions is by level of control, which distinguishes prescription drugs (those that a pharmacist dispenses only on the medical prescription) from over-the-counter drugs (those that consumers can order for themselves). Medicines may be classified by mode of action, route of administration, biological system affected, or therapeutic effects. The World Health Organization keeps a list of essential medicines.

Drug discovery and drug development are complex and expensive endeavors undertaken by pharmaceutical companies, academic scientists, and governments. As a result of this complex path from discovery to commercialization, partnering has become a standard practice for advancing drug candidates through development pipelines. Governments generally regulate what drugs can be marketed, how drugs are marketed, and in some jurisdictions, drug pricing. Controversies have arisen over drug pricing and disposal of used medications.

== Definition ==
Medication is a medicine or a chemical compound used to treat or cure illness. According to Encyclopædia Britannica, medication is "a substance used in treating a disease or relieving pain".

As defined by the National Cancer Institute, dosage forms of medication can include tablets, capsules, liquids, creams, and patches. Medications can be administered in different ways, such as by mouth, by infusion into a vein, or by drops put into the ear or eye. A medication that does not contain an active ingredient and is used in research studies is called a placebo.

In Europe, the term is "medicinal product", and it is defined by EU law as:

- "Any substance or combination of substances presented as having properties for treating or preventing disease in human beings; or"
- "Any substance or combination of substances which may be used in or administered to human beings either with a view to restoring, correcting, or modifying physiological functions by exerting a pharmacological, immunological or metabolic action or to making a medical diagnosis."

In the US, a "drug" is:

- A substance (other than food) intended to affect the structure or any function of the body.
- A substance intended for use as a component of a medicine but not a device or a component, part, or accessory of a device.
- A substance intended for use in the diagnosis, cure, mitigation, treatment, or prevention of disease.
- A substance recognized by an official pharmacopeia or formulary.
- Biological products are included within this definition and are generally covered by the same laws and regulations, but differences exist regarding their manufacturing processes (chemical process versus biological process).

== Usage ==
Drug use among elderly Americans has been studied; in a group of 2,377 people with an average age of 71 surveyed between 2005 and 2006, 84% took at least one prescription drug, 44% took at least one over-the-counter (OTC) drug, and 52% took at least one dietary supplement; in a group of 2245 elderly Americans (average age of 71) surveyed over the period 2010 – 2011, those percentages were 88%, 38%, and 64%.

== Classification ==
One of the key classifications is between traditional small molecule drugs; usually derived from chemical synthesis and biological medical products; which include recombinant proteins, vaccines, blood products used therapeutically (such as IVIG), gene therapy, and cell therapy (for instance, stem cell therapies).

Pharmaceuticals or drugs or medicines are classified into various other groups besides their origin on the basis of pharmacological properties like mode of action and their pharmacological action or activity, such as by chemical properties, mode or route of administration, biological system affected, or therapeutic effects. An elaborate and widely used classification system is the Anatomical Therapeutic Chemical Classification System (ATC system). The World Health Organization keeps a list of essential medicines.

Pharmaceuticals may also be described as "specialty", independent of other classifications, which is an ill-defined class of drugs that might be difficult to administer, require special handling during administration, require patient monitoring during and immediately after administration, have particular regulatory requirements restricting their use, and are generally expensive relative to other drugs.

=== Classification By Function ===
Medicines may be classified by their therapeutic function—that is, the role they play in treating or preventing disease. The following table summarizes common categories of medications by their primary use:

Type	Definition	Examples
Analgesics	Used to relieve pain	Acetylsalicylic acid (ASA), acetaminophen (paracetamol), ibuprofen
Antibiotics	Used to kill or inhibit the growth of bacteria	Penicillin, amoxicillin, ciprofloxacin
Antifungals	Used to kill or inhibit the growth of fungal pathogens	Clotrimazole, fluconazole, metronidazole
Antihistamines	Used to reduce allergy symptoms	Diphenhydramine, cetirizine, loratadine
Antipyretics	Used to reduce fever	Acetylsalicylic acid (ASA), acetaminophen (paracetamol)
Antivirals	Used to kill or inhibit the growth of viral pathogens	Acyclovir, ganciclovir, oseltamivir
Anticoagulants	Used to prevent blood clot formation	Apixaban, heparin, enoxaparin
Antidepressants	Used to manage depression and related mental health conditions	Sertraline, fluoxetine, bupropion
Antineoplastics	Used in the treatment of cancer	Cyclophosphamide, etoposide
Antipsychotics	Used to manage severe mental health conditions (such as schizophrenia, treatment-resistant depression)	Haloperidol, clozapine, aripiprazole
Bronchodilators	Used to open the airways in the lungs	Albuterol, formoterol, tiotropium
Corticosteroids	Used to reduce inflammation throughout the body	Dexamethasone, prednisone, triamcinolone
Mood Stabilizers	Used to treat bipolar disorder and other mood-related conditions	Lithium, lamotrigine
Statins	Used to lower blood cholesterol levels	Atorvastatin, rosuvastatin, pravastatin
Antacids	Neutralize stomach acid to relieve heartburn and indigestion	Calcium carbonate, magnesium hydroxide
Proton pump inhibitors (PPIs)	Reduce stomach acid production by blocking proton pumps	Omeprazole, pantoprazole, lansoprazole
H2 receptor antagonists	Reduce stomach acid by blocking histamine H2 receptors	Famotidine, ranitidine (withdrawn in many countries)
Antiemetics	Used to prevent or treat nausea and vomiting	Ondansetron, metoclopramide, promethazine
Anticonvulsants	Used to manage or prevent seizures	Valproic acid, carbamazepine, oxcarbazepine
Diuretics	Promote urine production to reduce fluid overload and lower blood pressure	Furosemide, hydrochlorothiazide, bumetanide
Beta blockers	Lower heart rate and blood pressure by blocking beta-adrenergic receptors	Metoprolol, propranolol, atenolol
Calcium channel blockers	Relax blood vessels and reduce blood pressure	Amlodipine, diltiazem, nicardipine, clevidipine
ACE Inhibitors	Lower blood pressure by inhibiting angiotensin-converting enzyme	Enalapril, ramipril, lisinopril
Antidiabetics	Used to manage blood glucose levels in diabetes	Metformin, insulin, gliclazide
Thyroid hormones	Replace or supplement thyroid hormone levels	Levothyroxine, liothyronine,
Hormonal contraceptives	Prevent pregnancy by altering hormonal regulation	ethinyl estradiol/norgestimate, levonorgestrel
Sedatives / Hypnotics	Induce or maintain sleep, reduce anxiety	Zopiclone, alprazolam, zolpidem
Stimulants	Enhance alertness, attention, and energy	Methylphenidate, amphetamine, caffeine
Immunosuppressants	Suppress immune response to prevent organ rejection or treat autoimmune disease	Cyclosporine, tacrolimus, adalimumab
Vaccines	Stimulate the immune system to prevent infectious disease	Influenza vaccine, MMR, COVID-19 mRNA vaccines

=== By Administration ===
Medicines can also be categorized based on how they are administered. The route of administration can affect the speed and effectiveness of treatment. Below is a summary of common routes:

Type	Definition	Examples
Oral and Mucosal
Oral	Taken by mouth; the most common route of administration	Tablets, capsules, syrups
Sublingual	Placed under the tongue for rapid absorption into the bloodstream	Nitroglycerin, buprenorphine
Buccal	Placed between the gum and cheek; absorbed through oral mucosa	Fentanyl, misoprostol
Local Application
Topical	Applied directly to the skin or mucous membranes to treat localized conditions	Neosporin, mometasone ointment, clobetasol lotion
Ophthalmic	Applied to the eyes for local treatment	Artificial tears, timolol eye drops
Otic	Applied into the ear canal for local treatment	Antibiotic ear drops (combo ciprofloxacin with dexamethasone)
Nasal	Sprayed or instilled into the nose for local or systemic absorption	Fluticasone nasal spray, naloxone nasal spray
Suppositories	Delivers medication via the rectum, vagina, or urethra, depending on formulation	Rectal suppositories, vaginal pessaries
Transdermal	Delivers medication through the skin for systemic absorption, bypassing the digestive system	Transdermal patches (e.g., fentanyl, nicotine), transdermal gels (e.g. estradiol, diclofenac)
Inhalation
Inhalers	Delivers medication directly to the lungs, most often used for respiratory conditions	Salbutamol metered-dose inhalers (MDIs), Mometasone furoate dry powder Inhalers (DPIs)
Nebulized	Delivered as fine mist via nebuilizer especially for children or severe respiratory cases	Hypertonic saline, ipratropium
Parenteral (injectable)
Intramuscular	Injected into a muscle, typically the deltoid or gluteus. Commonly used for vaccines and fast-acting medications	Influenza vaccine, epinepherine
Subcutaneous	Injected into the fatty tissue beneath the skin. Commonly used for biologics, hormones, and insulin.	Insulin, low-molecular-weight heparin
Intravenous	Injected directly into a vein for immediate systemic effect. Commonly used for emergency medications, fluids and chemotherapy	Morphine, vancomycin, chemotherapy drugs
Intradermal	Injected into the dermis (just under the skin surface). Commonly used for allergy tests, tuberculosis screening	Tuberculin (Mantoux test)
Intrathecal	Injected into the cerebrospinal fluid within the spinal canal. Commonly used for chemotherapy and spinal anesthesia.	Methotrexate (for CNS cancers), bupivacaine
Epidural	Injected into the epidural space around the spinal cord. Commonly used for pain management, anesthesia during childbirth	Fentanyl, bupivacaine
Intraarticular	Injected into a joint space. Commonly used for joint inflammation (e.g. arthritis)	Triamcinolone, ketorolac, ropivacaine
Intraosseous	Injected directly into the bone marrow (emergency access when IV not possible). For emergency medicine in paediatrics and trauma	Fluids, epinephrine via IO device
Other
Implant	Surgically placed or subdermal device that releases medication over time	Contraceptive implants, insulin pumps, drug eluting stents

== Drug discovery ==
In the fields of medicine, biotechnology, and pharmacology, drug discovery is the process by which new drugs are discovered.

Historically, drugs were discovered by identifying the active ingredient from traditional remedies or by serendipitous discovery. Later chemical libraries of synthetic small molecules, natural products, or extracts were screened in intact cells or whole organisms to identify substances that have a desirable therapeutic effect in a process known as classical pharmacology. Since sequencing of the human genome which allowed rapid cloning and synthesis of large quantities of purified proteins, it has become common practice to use high throughput screening of large compound libraries against isolated biological targets which are hypothesized to be disease-modifying in a process known as reverse pharmacology. Hits from these screens are then tested in cells and then in animals for efficacy. Even more recently, scientists have been able to understand the shape of biological molecules at the atomic level and to use that knowledge to design (see drug design) drug candidates.

Modern drug discovery involves the identification of screening hits, medicinal chemistry, and optimization of those hits to increase the affinity, selectivity (to reduce the potential of side effects), efficacy/potency, metabolic stability (to increase the half-life), and oral bioavailability. Once a compound that fulfills all of these requirements has been identified, it will begin the process of drug development prior to clinical trials. One or more of these steps may, but not necessarily, involve computer-aided drug design.

Despite advances in technology and understanding of biological systems, drug discovery is still a lengthy, "expensive, difficult, and inefficient process" with a low rate of new therapeutic discovery. In 2010, the research and development cost of each new molecular entity (NME) was approximately US$1.8 billion. Drug discovery is done by pharmaceutical companies, sometimes with research assistance from universities. The "final product" of drug discovery is a patent on the potential drug. The drug requires very expensive Phase I, II, and III clinical trials, and most of them fail. Small companies have a critical role, often then selling the rights to larger companies that have the resources to run the clinical trials.

Drug discovery is different from Drug Development. Drug Discovery is often considered the process of identifying new medicine. At the same time, Drug development is delivering a new drug molecule into clinical practice. In its broad definition, this encompasses all steps from the basic research process of finding a suitable molecular target to supporting the drug's commercial launch.

== Development ==
Drug development is the process of bringing a new drug to the market once a lead compound has been identified through the process of drug discovery. It includes pre-clinical research (microorganisms/animals) and clinical trials (on humans) and may include the step of obtaining regulatory approval to market the drug.

Drug Development Process

Discovery: The Drug Development process starts with Discovery, a process of identifying a new medicine.

Development: Chemicals extracted from natural products are used to make pills, capsules, or syrups for oral use. Injections for direct infusion into the blood drops for eyes or ears.

Preclinical research: Drugs go under laboratory or animal testing, to ensure that they can be used on Humans.

Clinical testing: The drug is used on people to confirm that it is safe to use.

FDA Review: drug is sent to FDA before launching the drug into the market.

FDA post-Market Review: The drug is reviewed and monitored by FDA for the safety once it is available to the public.

== Regulation ==
The regulation of drugs varies by jurisdiction. In some countries, such as the United States, they are regulated at the national level by a single agency. In other jurisdictions, they are regulated at the state level, or at both state and national levels by various bodies, as is the case in Australia. The role of therapeutic goods regulation is designed mainly to protect the health and safety of the population. Regulation is aimed at ensuring the safety, quality, and efficacy of the therapeutic goods which are covered under the scope of the regulation. In most jurisdictions, therapeutic goods must be registered before they are allowed to be marketed. There is usually some degree of restriction on the availability of certain therapeutic goods depending on their risk to consumers.

Depending upon the jurisdiction, drugs may be divided into over-the-counter drugs (OTC) which may be available without special restrictions, and prescription drugs, which must be prescribed by a licensed medical practitioner in accordance with medical guidelines due to the risk of adverse effects and contraindications. The precise distinction between OTC and prescription depends on the legal jurisdiction. A third category, "behind-the-counter" drugs, is implemented in some jurisdictions. These do not require a prescription, but must be kept in the dispensary, not visible to the public, and be sold only by a pharmacist or pharmacy technician. Doctors may also prescribe prescription drugs for off-label use – purposes which the drugs were not originally approved for by the regulatory agency. The Classification of Pharmaco-Therapeutic Referrals helps guide the referral process between pharmacists and doctors.

The International Narcotics Control Board of the United Nations imposes a world law of prohibition of certain drugs. They publish a lengthy list of chemicals and plants whose trade and consumption (where applicable) are forbidden. OTC drugs are sold without restriction as they are considered safe enough that most people will not hurt themselves accidentally by taking it as instructed. Many countries, such as the United Kingdom have a third category of "pharmacy medicines", which can be sold only in registered pharmacies by or under the supervision of a pharmacist.

Medical errors include over-prescription and polypharmacy, mis-prescription, contraindication and lack of detail in dosage and administration instructions. In 2000 the definition of a prescription error was studied using a Delphi method conference; the conference was motivated by ambiguity in what a prescription error is and a need to use a uniform definition in studies.

== Drug pricing ==
In many jurisdictions, drug prices are regulated.

=== United Kingdom ===
In the UK, the Pharmaceutical Price Regulation Scheme is intended to ensure that the National Health Service is able to purchase drugs at reasonable prices. The prices are negotiated between the Department of Health, acting with the authority of Northern Ireland and the UK Government, and the representatives of the Pharmaceutical industry brands, the Association of the British Pharmaceutical Industry (ABPI). For 2017 this payment percentage set by the PPRS will be 4,75%.

=== Canada ===
In Canada, the Patented Medicine Prices Review Board examines drug pricing and determines if a price is excessive or not. In these circumstances, drug manufacturers must submit a proposed price to the appropriate regulatory agency. Furthermore, "the International Therapeutic Class Comparison Test is responsible for comparing the National Average Transaction Price of the patented drug product under review" different countries that the prices are being compared to are the following: France, Germany, Italy, Sweden, Switzerland, the United Kingdom, and the United States.

=== Brazil ===
In Brazil, the prices are regulated through legislation under the name of Medicamento Genérico (generic drugs) since 1999.

=== India ===
In India, drug prices are regulated by the National Pharmaceutical Pricing Authority.

=== United States ===
In the United States, drug costs are partially unregulated, but instead are the result of negotiations between drug companies and insurance companies.

High prices have been attributed to monopolies given to manufacturers by the government. New drug development costs continue to rise as well. Despite the enormous advances in science and technology, the number of new blockbuster drugs approved by the government per billion dollars spent has halved every 9 years since 1950.

== Blockbuster drug ==
A blockbuster drug is a drug that generates more than $1 billion in revenue for a pharmaceutical company in a single year. Cimetidine was the first drug ever to reach more than $1 billion a year in sales, thus making it the first blockbuster drug.

In the pharmaceutical industry, a blockbuster drug is one that achieves acceptance by prescribing physicians as a therapeutic standard for, most commonly, a highly prevalent chronic (rather than acute) condition. Patients often take the medicines for long periods.

== History ==
=== Prescription drug history ===
Antibiotics first arrived on the medical scene in 1932 thanks to Gerhard Domagk; and were coined the "wonder drugs". The introduction of the sulfa drugs led to the mortality rate from pneumonia in the U.S. to drop from 0.2% each year to 0.05% (i.e., 1/4 as much) by 1939. Antibiotics inhibit the growth or the metabolic activities of bacteria and other microorganisms by a chemical substance of microbial origin. Penicillin, introduced a few years later, provided a broader spectrum of activity compared to sulfa drugs and reduced side effects. Streptomycin, found in 1942, proved to be the first drug effective against the cause of tuberculosis and also came to be the best known of a long series of important antibiotics. A second generation of antibiotics was introduced in the 1940s: aureomycin and chloramphenicol. Aureomycin was the best known of the second generation.

Lithium was discovered in the 19th century for nervous disorders and its possible mood-stabilizing or prophylactic effect; it was cheap and easily produced. As lithium fell out of favor in France, valpromide came into play. This antibiotic was the origin of the drug that eventually created the mood stabilizer category. Valpromide had distinct psychotrophic effects that were of benefit in both the treatment of acute manic states and in the maintenance treatment of manic depression illness. Psychotropics can either be sedative or stimulant; sedatives aim at damping down the extremes of behavior. Stimulants aim at restoring normality by increasing tone. Soon arose the notion of a tranquilizer which was quite different from any sedative or stimulant. The term tranquilizer took over the notions of sedatives and became the dominant term in the West through the 1980s. In Japan, during this time, the term tranquilizer produced the notion of a psyche-stabilizer and the term mood stabilizer vanished.

Premarin (conjugated estrogens, introduced in 1942) and Prempro (a combination estrogen-progestin pill, introduced in 1995) dominated hormone replacement therapy (HRT) regimens during the 1990s. Though not designed to cure any disease, HRT is prescribed to improve quality of life and as a preventative measure, such as treating post-menopausal symptoms. In the 1960s and early 1970s, more physicians began to prescribe estrogen for their female patients. Between 1991 and 1999, Premarin was listed as the most popular prescription and best-selling drug in America.

The first oral contraceptive, Enovid, was approved by FDA in 1960. Oral contraceptives inhibit ovulation and so prevent conception. Enovid was known to be much more effective than alternatives including the condom and the diaphragm. As early as 1960, oral contraceptives were available in several different strengths by every manufacturer. In the 1980s and 1990s, an increasing number of options arose including, most recently, a new delivery system for the oral contraceptive via a transdermal patch. In 1982, a new version of "the pill" was introduced, known as the biphasic pill. By 1985, a new triphasic pill was approved. Physicians began to think of "the pill" as an excellent means of birth control for young women.

Stimulants such as Ritalin (methylphenidate) came to be pervasive tools for behavior management and modification in young children. Ritalin was first marketed in 1955 for narcolepsy; its potential users were middle-aged and the elderly. It was not until some time in the 1980s along with hyperactivity in children that Ritalin came onto the market. Medical use of methylphenidate is predominantly for symptoms of attention deficit hyperactivity disorder (ADHD). Consumption of methylphenidate in the U.S. out-paced all other countries between 1991 and 1999. Significant growth in consumption was also evident in Canada, New Zealand, Australia, and Norway. Currently, 85% of the world's methylphenidate is consumed in America.

The first minor tranquilizer was meprobamate. Only fourteen months after it was made available, meprobamate had become the country's largest-selling prescription drug. By 1957, meprobamate had become the fastest-growing drug in history. The popularity of meprobamate paved the way for Librium and Valium, two minor tranquilizers that belonged to a new chemical class of drugs called the benzodiazepines. These were drugs that worked chiefly as anti-anxiety agents and muscle relaxants. The first benzodiazepine was Librium. Three months after it was approved, Librium had become the most prescribed tranquilizer in the nation. Three years later, Valium hit the shelves and was ten times more effective as a muscle relaxant and anti-convulsant. Valium was the most versatile of the minor tranquilizers. Later came the widespread adoption of major tranquilizers such as chlorpromazine and the drug reserpine. In 1970, sales began to decline for Valium and Librium, but sales of new and improved tranquilizers, such as Xanax, introduced in 1981 for the newly created diagnosis of panic disorder, soared.

Mevacor (lovastatin) is the first and most influential statin in the American market. The 1991 launch of Pravachol (pravastatin), the second available in the United States, and the release of Zocor (simvastatin) made Mevacor no longer the only statin on the market. In 1998, Viagra was released as a treatment for erectile dysfunction.

=== Ancient pharmacology ===
Using plants and plant substances to treat all kinds of diseases and medical conditions is believed to date back to prehistoric medicine.

The Kahun Gynaecological Papyrus, the oldest known medical text of any kind, dates to about 1800 BC and represents the first documented use of any kind of drug. It and other medical papyri describe Ancient Egyptian medical practices, such as using honey to treat infections and the legs of bee-eaters to treat neck pains.

Ancient Babylonian medicine demonstrated the use of medication in the first half of the 2nd millennium BC. Medicinal creams and pills were employed as treatments.

On the Indian subcontinent, the Atharvaveda, a sacred text of Hinduism whose core dates from the second millennium BC, although the hymns recorded in it are believed to be older, is the first Indic text dealing with medicine. It describes plant-based drugs to counter diseases. The earliest foundations of ayurveda were built on a synthesis of selected ancient herbal practices, together with a massive addition of theoretical conceptualizations, new nosologies and new therapies dating from about 400 BC onwards. The student of Āyurveda was expected to know ten arts that were indispensable in the preparation and application of his medicines: distillation, operative skills, cooking, horticulture, metallurgy, sugar manufacture, pharmacy, analysis and separation of minerals, compounding of metals, and preparation of alkalis.

The Hippocratic Oath for physicians, attributed to fifth century BC Greece, refers to the existence of "deadly drugs", and ancient Greek physicians imported drugs from Egypt and elsewhere. The pharmacopoeia De materia medica, written between 50 and 70 CE by the Greek physician Pedanius Dioscorides, was widely read for more than 1,500 years.

=== Medieval pharmacology ===
Al-Kindi's ninth century AD book, De Gradibus and Ibn Sina (Avicenna)'s The Canon of Medicine, covers a range of drugs known to the practice of medicine in the medieval Islamic world.

Medieval medicine of Western Europe saw advances in surgery compared to previously, but few truly effective drugs existed, beyond opium (found in such extremely popular drugs as the "Great Rest" of the Antidotarium Nicolai at the time) and quinine. Folklore cures and potentially poisonous metal-based compounds were popular treatments. Theodoric Borgognoni, (1205–1296), one of the most significant surgeons of the medieval period, responsible for introducing and promoting important surgical advances including basic antiseptic practice and the use of anaesthetics. Garcia de Orta described some herbal treatments that were used.

=== Modern pharmacology ===
For most of the 19th century, drugs were not highly effective, leading Oliver Wendell Holmes Sr. to famously comment in 1842 that "if all medicines in the world were thrown into the sea, it would be all the better for mankind and all the worse for the fishes".

During the First World War, Alexis Carrel and Henry Dakin developed the Carrel-Dakin method of treating wounds with an irrigation, Dakin's solution, a germicide which helped prevent gangrene.

In the inter-war period, the first anti-bacterial agents such as the sulpha antibiotics were developed. The Second World War saw the introduction of widespread and effective antimicrobial therapy with the development and mass production of penicillin antibiotics, made possible by the pressures of the war and the collaboration of British scientists with the American pharmaceutical industry.

Medicines commonly used by the late 1920s included aspirin, codeine, and morphine for pain; digitalis, nitroglycerin, and quinine for heart disorders, and insulin for diabetes. Other drugs included antitoxins, a few biological vaccines, and a few synthetic drugs. In the 1930s, antibiotics emerged: first sulfa drugs, then penicillin and other antibiotics. Drugs increasingly became "the center of medical practice". In the 1950s, other drugs emerged including corticosteroids for inflammation, rauvolfia alkaloids as tranquilizers and antihypertensives, antihistamines for nasal allergies, xanthines for asthma, and typical antipsychotics for psychosis. As of 2007, thousands of approved drugs have been developed. Increasingly, biotechnology is used to discover biopharmaceuticals. Recently, multi-disciplinary approaches have yielded a wealth of new data on the development of novel antibiotics and antibacterials and on the use of biological agents for antibacterial therapy.

In the 1950s, new psychiatric drugs, notably the antipsychotic chlorpromazine, were designed in laboratories and slowly came into preferred use. Although often accepted as an advance in some ways, there was some opposition, due to serious adverse effects such as tardive dyskinesia. Patients often opposed psychiatry and refused or stopped taking the drugs when not subject to psychiatric control.

Governments have been heavily involved in the regulation of drug development and drug sales. In the U.S., the Elixir Sulfanilamide disaster led to the establishment of the Food and Drug Administration, and the 1938 Federal Food, Drug, and Cosmetic Act required manufacturers to file new drugs with the FDA. The 1951 Humphrey-Durham Amendment required certain drugs to be sold by prescription. In 1962, a subsequent amendment required new drugs to be tested for efficacy and safety in clinical trials.

Until the 1970s, drug prices were not a major concern for doctors and patients. As more drugs became prescribed for chronic illnesses, however, costs became burdensome, and by the 1970s nearly every U.S. state required or encouraged the substitution of generic drugs for higher-priced brand names. This also led to the 2006 U.S. law, Medicare Part D, which offers Medicare coverage for drugs.

As of 2008, the United States is the leader in medical research, including pharmaceutical development. U.S. drug prices are among the highest in the world, and drug innovation is correspondingly high. In 2000, U.S.-based firms developed 29 of the 75 top-selling drugs; firms from the second-largest market, Japan, developed eight, and the United Kingdom contributed 10. France, which imposes price controls, developed three. Throughout the 1990s, outcomes were similar.

== Controversies ==
Controversies concerning pharmaceutical drugs include patient access to drugs under development and not yet approved, pricing, and environmental issues.

=== Access to unapproved drugs ===
Governments worldwide have created provisions for granting access to drugs prior to approval for patients who have exhausted all alternative treatment options and do not match clinical trial entry criteria. Often grouped under the labels of compassionate use, expanded access, or named patient supply, these programs are governed by rules which vary by country defining access criteria, data collection, promotion, and control of drug distribution.

Within the United States, pre-approval demand is generally met through treatment IND (investigational new drug) applications (INDs), or single-patient INDs. These mechanisms, which fall under the label of expanded access programs, provide access to drugs for groups of patients or individuals residing in the US. Outside the US, Named Patient Programs provide controlled, pre-approval access to drugs in response to requests by physicians on behalf of specific, or "named", patients before those medicines are licensed in the patient's home country. Through these programs, patients are able to access drugs in late-stage clinical trials or approved in other countries for a genuine, unmet medical need, before those drugs have been licensed in the patient's home country.

Patients who have not been able to get access to drugs in development have organized and advocated for greater access. In the United States, ACT UP formed in the 1980s, and eventually formed its Treatment Action Group in part to pressure the US government to put more resources into discovering treatments for AIDS and then to speed release of drugs that were under development.

The Abigail Alliance was established in November 2001 by Frank Burroughs in memory of his daughter, Abigail. The Alliance seeks broader availability of investigational drugs on behalf of terminally ill patients.

In 2013, BioMarin Pharmaceutical was at the center of a high-profile debate regarding expanded access of cancer patients to experimental drugs.

=== Access to medicines and drug pricing ===
Essential medicines, as defined by the World Health Organization (WHO), are "those drugs that satisfy the health care needs of the majority of the population; they should therefore be available at all times in adequate amounts and in appropriate dosage forms, at a price the community can afford." Recent studies have found that most of the medicines on the WHO essential medicines list, outside of the field of HIV drugs, are not patented in the developing world, and that lack of widespread access to these medicines arise from issues fundamental to economic development – lack of infrastructure and poverty. Médecins Sans Frontières also runs a Campaign for Access to Essential Medicines campaign, which includes advocacy for greater resources to be devoted to currently untreatable diseases that primarily occur in the developing world. The Access to Medicine Index tracks how well pharmaceutical companies make their products available in the developing world.

World Trade Organization negotiations in the 1990s, including the TRIPS Agreement and the Doha Declaration, have centered on issues at the intersection of international trade in pharmaceuticals and intellectual property rights, with developed world nations seeking strong intellectual property rights to protect investments made to develop new drugs, and developing world nations seeking to promote their generic pharmaceuticals industries and their ability to make medicine available to their people via compulsory licenses.

Some have raised ethical objections specifically with respect to pharmaceutical patents and the high prices for drugs that they enable their proprietors to charge, which poor people around the world, cannot afford. Critics also question the rationale that exclusive patent rights and the resulting high prices are required for pharmaceutical companies to recoup the large investments needed for research and development. One study concluded that marketing expenditures for new drugs often doubled the amount that was allocated for research and development. Other critics claim that patent settlements would be costly for consumers, the health care system, and state and federal governments because it would result in delaying access to lower cost generic medicines.

Novartis fought a protracted battle with the government of India over the patenting of its drug, Gleevec, in India, which ended up in a Supreme Court in a case known as Novartis v. Union of India & Others. The Supreme Court ruled narrowly against Novartis, but opponents of patenting drugs claimed it as a major victory.

=== Environmental issues ===
Pharmaceutical medications are commonly described as "ubiquitous" in nearly every type of environmental medium (i.e. lakes, rivers, streams, estuaries, seawater, and soil) worldwide. Their chemical components are typically present at relatively low concentrations in the ng/L to μg/L ranges. The primary avenue for medications reaching the environment are through the effluent of wastewater treatment plants, both from industrial plants during production, and from municipal plants after consumption. Agricultural pollution is another significant source derived from the prevalence of antibiotic use in livestock.

Scientists generally divide environmental impacts of a chemical into three primary categories: persistence, bioaccumulation, and toxicity. Since medications are inherently bio-active, most are naturally degradable in the environment, however they are classified as "pseudopersistent" because they are constantly being replenished from their sources. These Environmentally Persistent Pharmaceutical Pollutants (EPPPs) rarely reach toxic concentrations in the environment, however they have been known to bioaccumulate in some species. Their effects have been observed to compound gradually across food webs, rather than becoming acute, leading to their classification by the US Geological Survey as "Ecological Disrupting Compounds."

== See also ==
- Adherence
- Deprescribing
- Drug nomenclature
- List of drugs
- List of pharmaceutical companies
- Orphan drug
- Overmedication
- Pharmaceutical code
- Pharmacy
