= Health Action International =

NGO based in Amsterdam for health initiatives

Health Action International Inc
- Formation: 1981; 45 years ago
- Type: Nonprofit NGO
- Purpose: Access to medicines
- Headquarters: Amsterdam, The Netherlands
- Region served: International
- Official language: English
- Executive Director: Dr Tim Reed
- Staff: 17
- Website: haiweb.org

Health Action International (HAI) is a non-profit organization based in The Netherlands. Established in 1981, HAI works to expand access to essential medicines through research, policy analysis and intervention projects. The organization focuses on snakebite envenoming, access to insulin and developing European policies on medicines. HAI is listed by the World Health Organization (WHO) as an official non-state actor.

== History ==
HAI was founded in Geneva in early 1981 following an International Baby Food Action Network (IFBAN) conference and before a global conference on International Women and Health meeting to be held in Geneva. After limiting marketing of infant formulas to the third world, three groups came together to co-sponsor this meeting, the International Organization of Consumers Unions (IOCU), the BUKO Pharma-Kampagne, an organization that watches over the marketing practices of German pharmaceutical companies and the United Nations Non-Governmental Liaison Service (NGLS), and brought together 50 anthropologists, physicians, pharmacists and organizers from 27 countries to form an "international antibody" against pharmaceutical marketing practices and used "innovative techniques to get their message to the delegates". It was similar to IFBAN but was organized to replace branded drugs with generics. The US Pharmaceutical Manufacturing Association said "we take this as a serious potential problem, both from a marketing threat here and now and for a WHO resolution in the future."

HAI was immediately criticized by the pharmaceutical industry who implied a connection with Moscow The German Pharmaceutical Manufacturing Association (BPI) published an article on the formation of HAI and connected it to a conference in November 1981 in Moscow of the World Federation of Trade Unions. Claus Roepnack, then CEO of a German pharmaceutical company, Hoechst AG, asked whether the activists of HAI meant to overthrow "existing social and economic systems in favor of authoritarian regimes". In 1987, the Thai newspaper The Nation made similar allegations.

In 1982, HAI proposed a draft for "an international code on pharmaceuticals" at the 35th World Health Assembly (WHA) meeting in an attempt to regulate the conduct of multinational drug companies, especially in developing countries. The attempt was unsuccessful, and the WHA declined to discuss the proposal.

In 1984, HAI produced a video, Hard to Swallow, in collaboration with Oxfam about the experiences of Dianna Melrose of pharmaceutical sales rep practices in Peru. That same year, HAI lobbied the WHA delegates and published a number of publications to incorporate responsible drug use into the WHO's Essential Drugs Monitor. Not all of HAI's initiatives against the pharmaceutical industry were appreciated by the WHO.

At one point, Asian operations were housed in Penang, Malaysia and a European operation was located in The Hague in the 90's but moved its headquarters to Amsterdam.

A two-year project started in 1986 helped to reduce the use of Neomycin in antidiarrhetic products globally from 12% down to 7%.

At the 41st World Health Assembly in 1987, HAI organised a large lobby of delegates to advocate for stronger controls on advertising by the pharmaceutical industry. It advocated for an independent drug code similar to the US FDA but under the WHO which would replace the International Federation of Pharmaceutical Manufacturers & Associations drug marketing code.

In 1988, HAI began discussions around issues with the Bamako Initiative. This initiative was a plan for UNICEF and other donors to supply drugs to Sub-Saharan African countries which would be sold a little above cost. The profits from these sales would be used to buy more drugs in a self-sustaining way. This work modified HAI's purpose to move towards health policy rather than just responsible medicine use.

In 1989, the organization testified in front of the FDA arguing against the approval of Norplant, a hormone capsule implant developed by Wyeth-Ayerst Laboratories and designed as a long-acting contraceptive. It was approved and used by about a million women. HAI claimed that the implant had not been rigorously scientifically tested and warned of serious problems, among them its removal, infection at the implant site, and unknown long-term side effects.

In response to 2001 WHA resolution, HAI together with the WHO a established a survey methodology to assess global drug prices and accessibility.

== Purpose ==
HAI works to increase access to essential medicines and encourage responsible medicine use. Projects included neglected tropical diseases, access to insulin, sexual and reproductive health commodities, controlled medicines and transparency of medicine prices. According to Silverman et al. (1992), HAI and IOCU are the two organizations that have had the greatest impact on drug company activities in the third world.

== Snakebites ==
Map showing the approximate world distribution of snakes.

Map showing the global distribution of snakebite morbidity.

HAI works in Kenya, Uganda, Zambia and at the global level with WHO to gather snakebite incidence and treatments, including research and community education on first-aid and prevention. HAI also works with local governments for policies to improved access to effective and safe antivenoms, and proper training for healthcare workers. At the global level, HAI works with international partners such as the WHO Neglected Tropical Disease (NTD) Department and the Global Snakebite Initiative. HAI played an important role in including snakebite as a WHO Category A Neglected Tropical Disease (NTD) status in, a WHO resolution and development of global strategy to decrease burden of snakebite .

== Access to insulin ==
HAI produced a study of the global insulin market in 2018. It then developed policies and tools to increase insulin access, and studied the cost of insulin production and estimated the number of people with type 2 diabetes. HAI received a $3.5 million grant from The Leona M. and Harry B. Helmsley Charitable Trust in 2018 to study insulin access in low and middle income countries.

== European policy ==
HAI works to expand access to affordable medicines, promote medicine safety and enhance therapeutic value. HAI uses the TRIPS Agreement, issuing policy recommendations on health technology assessment (HTA) and raising awareness on the impact of pharmaceutical marketing on prescribing behaviours.

In 2011, HAI received a 218,000 Euro grant from the EU to look at strategies to improve access to medicines.
