= Cattle feeding =

Methods of providing dietary sustenance to cattle

There are different systems of feeding cattle in animal husbandry. For pastured animals, grass is usually the forage that composes the majority of their diet. In turn, this grass-fed approach is known for producing meat with distinct flavor profiles. Cattle reared in feedlots are fed hay supplemented with grain, soy and other ingredients to increase the energy density of the feed. The debate is whether cattle should be raised on fodder primarily composed of grass or a concentrate. The issue is complicated by the political interests and confusion between labels such as "free range", "organic", or "natural". Cattle raised on a primarily foraged diet are termed grass-fed or pasture-raised; for example meat or milk may be called grass-fed beef or pasture-raised dairy. The term "pasture-raised" can lead to confusion with the term "free range", which does not describe exactly what the animals eat.

== Types of feeding ==
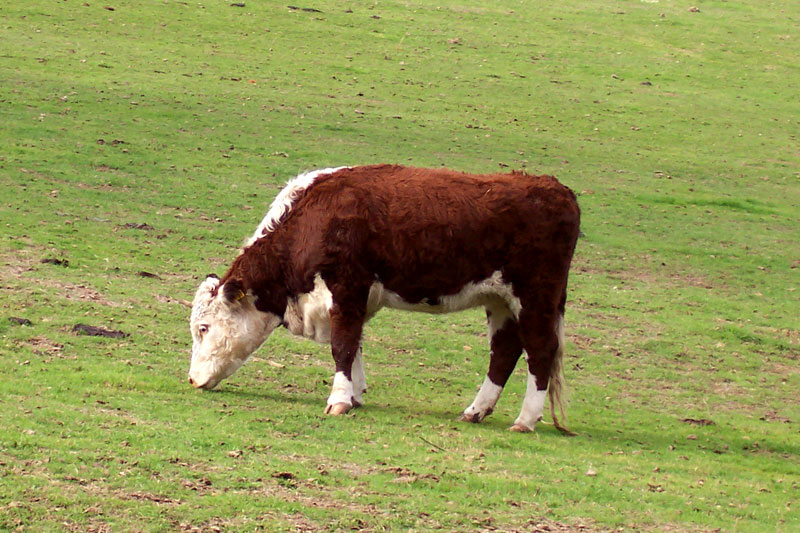
A Hereford cow eating grass

=== Grazing ===
Grazing by cattle is practiced in rangelands, pastures and grasslands. According to the Food and Agriculture Organization, about 60% of the world's grassland is occupied by grazing systems. "Grazing systems supply about 9 percent of the world's production of beef ... For an estimated 100 million people in arid areas, and probably a similar number in other zones, grazing livestock is the only possible source of livelihood."

=== Integrated livestock-crop farming ===
In this system, cattle are primarily fed on pastures, crop residues and fallows. Mixed farming systems are the largest category of livestock system in the world in terms of production.

=== Feedlot and intensive finishing ===
Feedlot and intensive finishing are intensive forms of animal production. Cattle are often "finished" here, spending the last months before their slaughter gaining weight. They are fed nutritionally dense feed, also known as "concentrate" or "filler corn", in stalls, pens and feedlots at high stocking densities in enclosures. This achieves maximal rates of liveweight gain.

== Types of cattle feeds ==
Many distinct types of feed may be used, depending on economics, cattle type, region, etc. Feed types may also be mixed together, such as with total mixed ration.

=== Grass-fed ===
Grass and other forage compose most or the majority of a grass-fed diet. There is debate whether cattle should be raised on diets primarily composed of pasture (grass) or on a concentrated diet of grain, soy, and other supplements. The issue is often complicated by the political interests and confusion between labels such as "free range", "organic", and "natural".

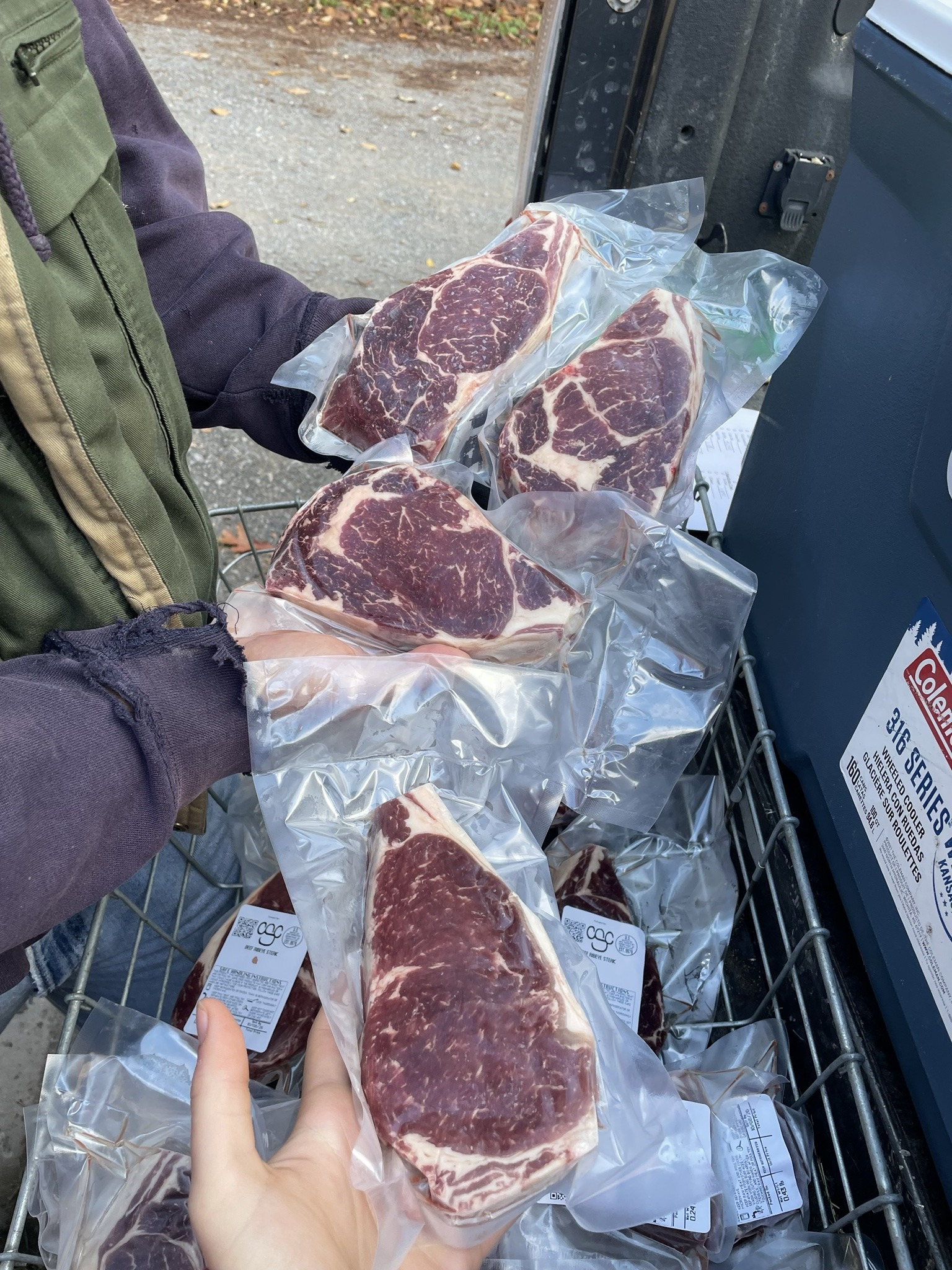
Ribeye steaks from grass-finished American Angus steers.

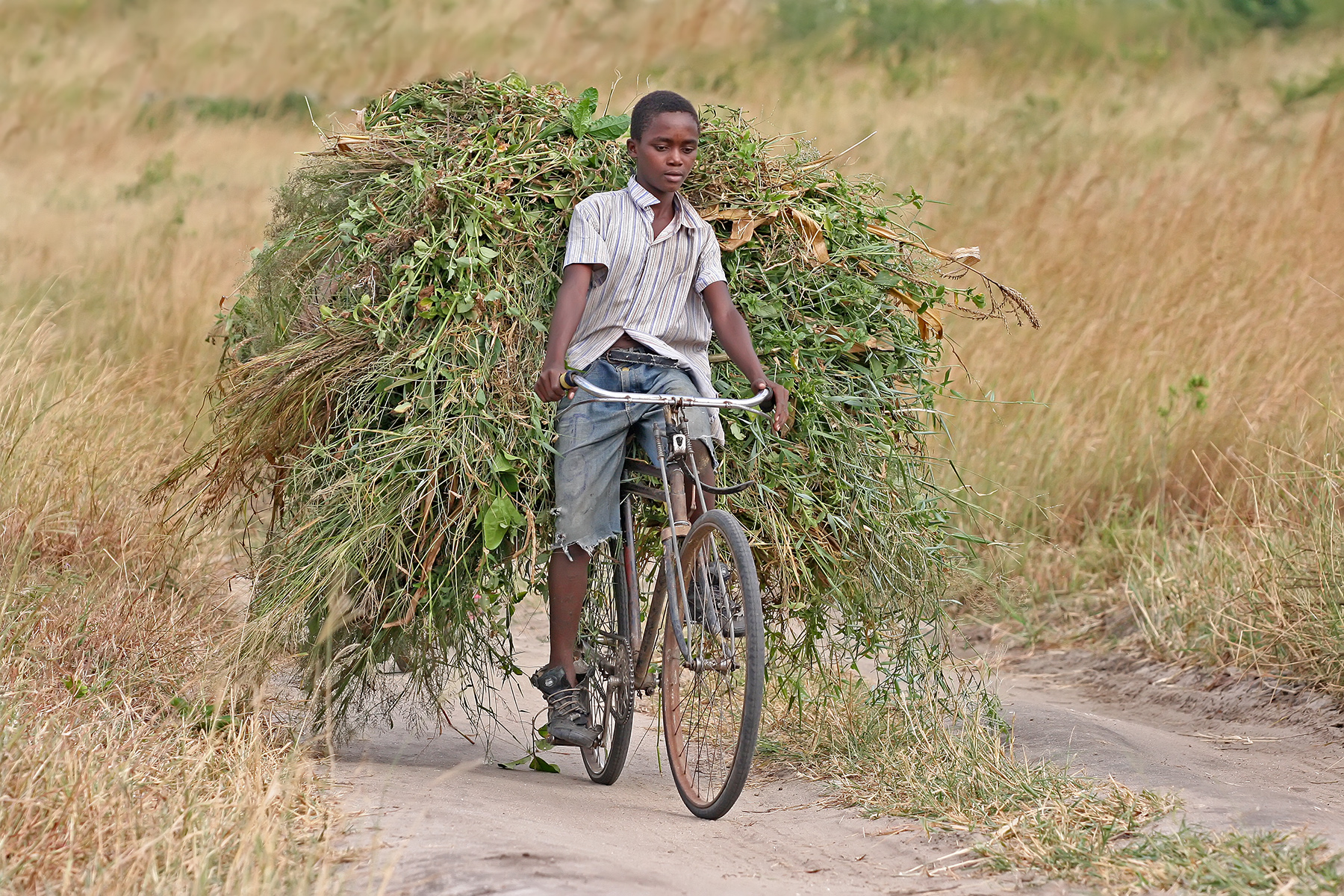
Cut fodder being transported to feed cattle in Tanzania

Cattle reared on a primarily forage diet are termed grass-fed or pasture-raised; meat or milk may be called "grass-fed beef" or "pasture-raised dairy". The term "pasture-raised" can lead to confusion with the term "free range" which describes where the animals reside, but not what they eat. Thus, cattle can be labelled free-range yet not necessarily be grass-fed, and vice versa, and organic beef can be either or none. Another term adopted by the industry is grass-finished (also, 100% grass-fed), for which cattle are said to spend 100% of their lives on grass pasture. The Agricultural Marketing Service of the United States Department of Agriculture previously had a regulated standard for certification as "Grass Fed" meat, but withdrew the standard in 2016. However, producers must still apply the USDA's Food Safety and Inspection Service for the right to put "grass fed" on a label.

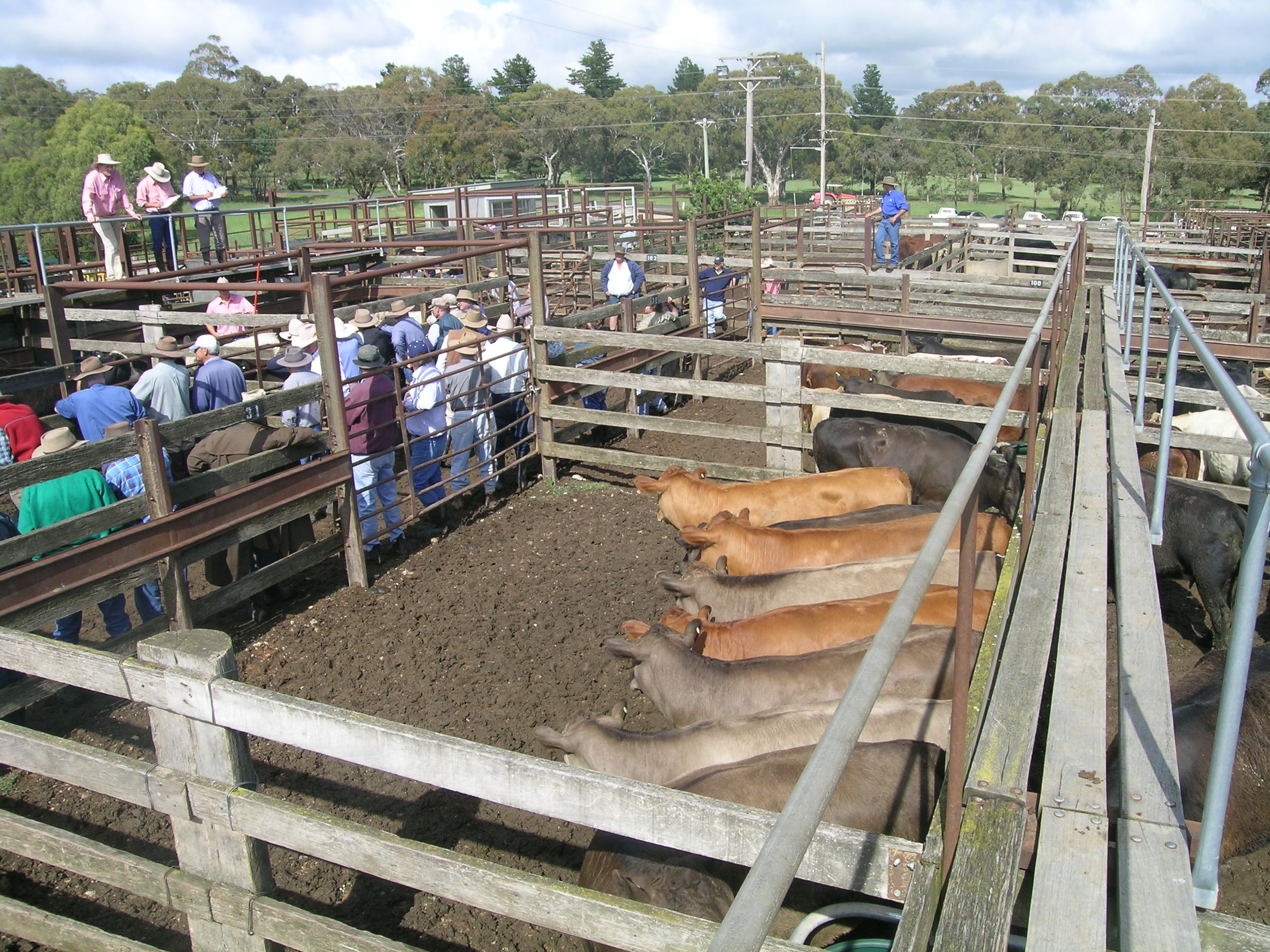
Grass-fed cattle at a Walcha, New South Wales sale

=== Corn-fed ===
Cattle called corn-fed, grain-fed or corn-finished are typically raised on maize, soy and other types of feed. Some corn-fed cattle are raised in concentrated animal feeding operations known as feed lots.

In the United States, dairy cattle are often supplemented with grain to increase the efficiency of production and reduce the area needed to support the energy requirements of the herd.

A high-energy diet increases milk output, measured in pounds or kilograms of milk per head per day.

=== Barley-fed ===
In Western Canada beef cattle are usually finished on a barley-based diet.

=== Flax ===
In some parts of the world flax (or linseed) is used to make linseed oil, and the substance is mixed with other solid cattle feed as a protein supplement. It can only be added at low percentages due to the high fat content, which is unhealthy for ruminants. One study found that feeding flax seeds may increase omega-3 content and improve marbling in the resultant beef, while another found no differences.

=== Other ===
There are many alternative feeds which are given to cattle, either as a primary or supplemental feed. These range from alfalfa and other forages, silages of diverse plants, crop residues such as pea regrowth, straw or seed hulls, residues from other production such as oilseed meal cake, molasses, whey, and crops such as beets or sorghum.

=== Drought fodder for extensive rangeland agriculture ===
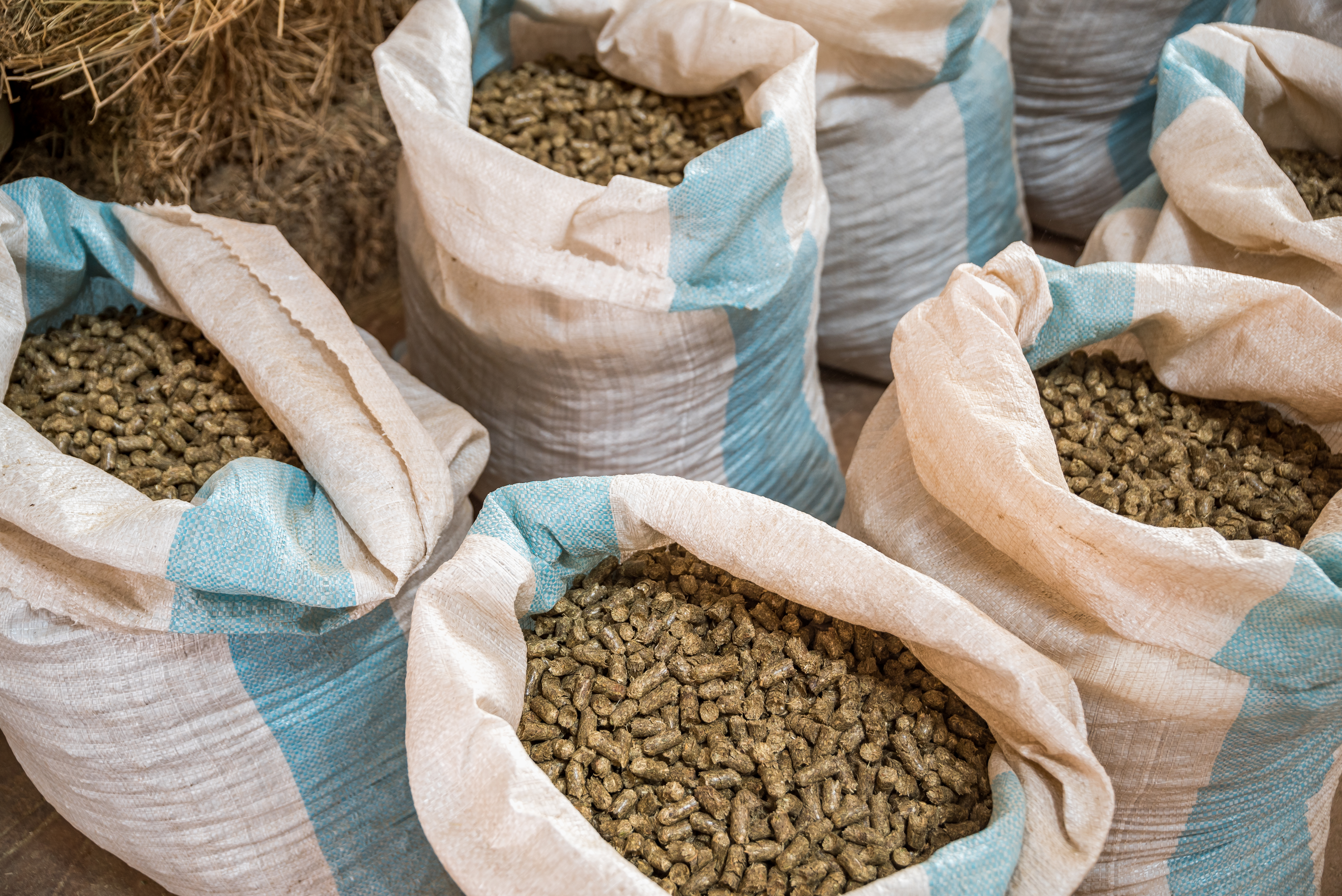
Bags of pelleted cattle fodder made from encroacher bush in Namibia

Drought events put rangeland agriculture under pressure in semi-arid and arid geographic areas. Innovative emergency fodder production concepts have been reported, such as bush-based animal fodder production in Namibia. During extended dry spells, farmers have turned to use woody biomass fiber from encroacher bush as a primary source of cattle feed, adding locally available supplements for nutrients as well as to improve palatability.

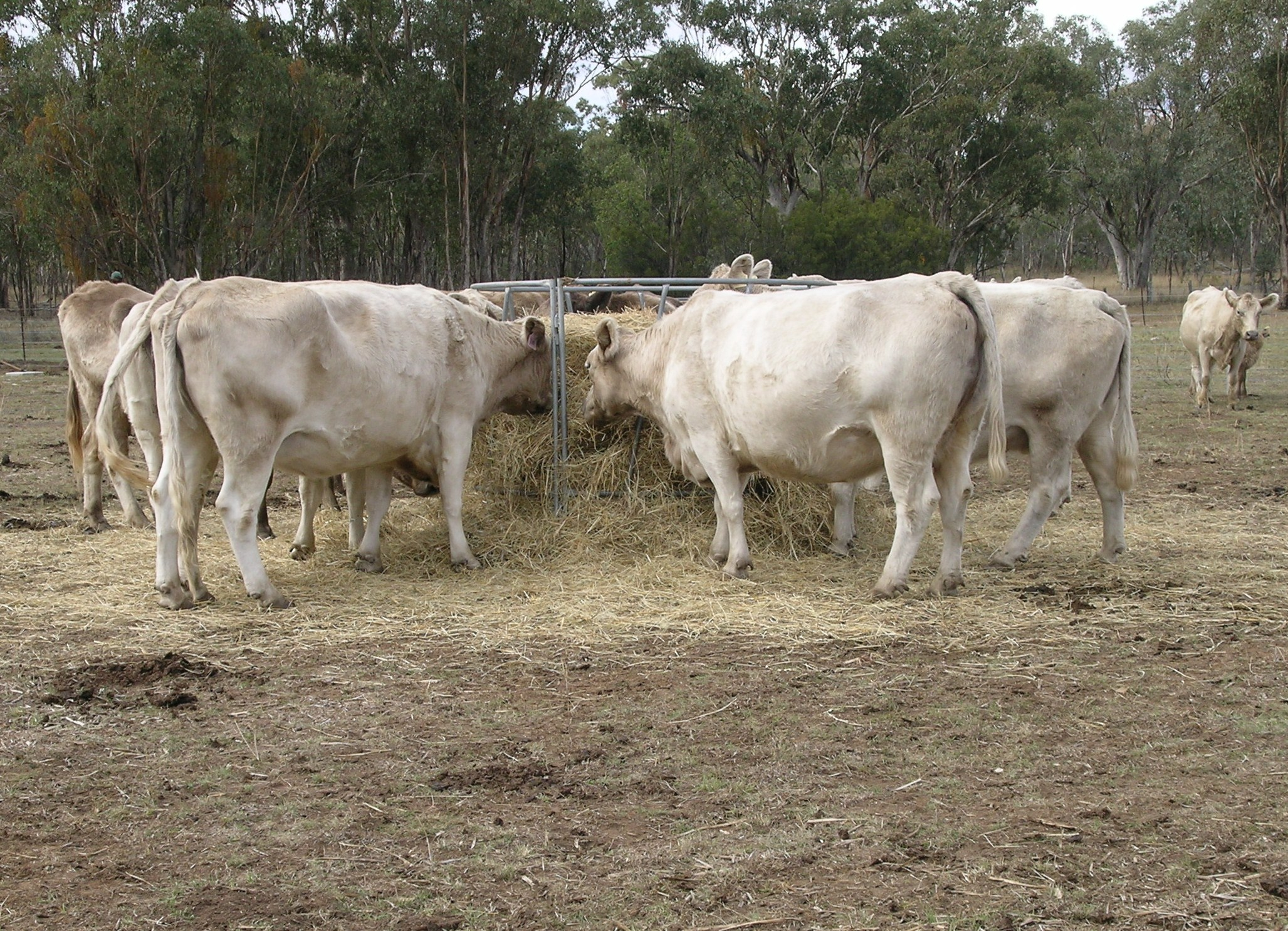
Stud Murray Grey cows receiving supplementary feeding during a drought

== Medicinal and synthetic additives ==
Cattle feed may also include various substances such as glycerol, veterinary drugs, growth hormones, feed additives or nutraceuticals to improve production efficiency.

=== Antibiotics ===
Antibiotics are routinely given to livestock, which account for 70% of the antibiotic use in the United States. This practice contributes to the rise of antibiotic-resistant bacteria. Antibiotic resistance is a naturally occurring phenomenon throughout the world due to the overuse and/or inappropriate use of antibiotics. In an effort to curb antibiotic resistance, the Food and Drug Administration created a "5 Year Veterinary Stewardship Plan", which eliminated over-the-counter availability of antibiotics for use in cattle in June 2023. Antibiotics for bovine use are now only available for purchase through veterinary prescription.

The most common form of antibiotics are called ionophores. Ionophores were originally developed as coccidiostats for poultry, and prevent coccidiosis in cattle as well. Ionophores work by improving both feed efficiency and growth rate, and lower methane production as one result. These effectively work as growth promoters due to an increase in food and water uptake and increase the digestive effectiveness of the animal.

Antibiotics are used in the cattle industry for therapeutic purposes in the clinical treatment of infections and prophylactically for disease prevention by controlling the growth of potentially harmful bacteria. Because of their effectiveness in the treatment and prevention of diseases, there is an increased efficiency of the farm. This results in reduced costs for cattle producers, and for consumers. Antibiotics are also present in antibacterial cleaning products, and in disinfection products used in farm and veterinary practices.

A critical journalist has claimed that the lower population density in free-range animals need decreased antibiotics usage, and has conjectured that cattle would not get sick if they were not fed a corn-based diet. However, bovine respiratory disease, the most common reason for antibiotic therapy, has risk factors common in both forms of production (feedlot and pasture finished).

==== Safety ====
Due to concerns about antibiotics residues getting into the milk or meat of cattle, there are regulatory agencies and measures in place in order to ensure that foods produced do not contain antibiotics at a level which will cause harm to consumers in the United States and Canada.

=== Growth stimulants ===
The use of supplemental growth hormones is controversial. The benefits of using growth hormones includes improved feed efficiency, carcass quality and rate of muscle development. The cattle industry takes the position that the use of growth hormones allows plentiful meats to be sold for affordable prices. Using hormones in beef cattle costs $1.50 and adds between 40 and 50 lb (18 and 23 kg) to the weight of a steer at slaughter, for a return of at least $25.

Bovine somatotropin, or bovine growth hormone, is a naturally produced protein in cattle. Recombinant bovine somatotropin (rBST), or recombinant bovine growth hormone (rBGH), is growth hormone produced using microbes with modified (recombinant) DNA. The manufactured product Posilac, which was approved in the United States in 1993, was Monsanto's first genetically modified venture in that country; however, its use has been controversial. As of 2002, testing could not yet distinguish between artificial hormones and those naturally produced by the animal itself, but as of 2011, it was remarked that the amino acids differ. Some studies report an increased presence in humans of rBGH and its IGF-1 product molecule.

==== Safety ====
There exists customer concern about growth hormone use being linked to a number of human health problems, such as precocious puberty or cancer. However, there is no concrete evidence to give credence to these concerns. In Canada, all veterinary drugs used in food production processes are required to pass tests and regulations set by the Veterinary Drugs Directorate (VDD) and are enforced by the Food and Drug Act of Health Canada. The Canadian Food Inspection Agency (CFIA) monitors all food products in Canada by sampling and testing by veterinarians and inspectors working on behalf of the provincial and federal governments. They monitor the food supply to condemn and destroy any product that is unacceptable. In the rare case where the CFIA have found a residue, it has been substantially below the Maximum Residue Limit (MRL) acceptable for safe consumption, this is the maximum amount of a drug residue that may remain in a food product at the time of human consumption based on Acceptable Daily Intakes (ADI). The ADI level is determined from toxicology studies to be the highest amount of a substance that can be consumed daily throughout a lifespan without causing adverse effects. Beef hormone residues are MRLs that have been established by the Joint Expert Committee on Food Additives of the United Nations. The World Health Organization stated that the hormone levels are indistinguishable between implanted and non-implanted animals.

There are three natural hormones (estradiol, progesterone, and testosterone), naturally present in cattle and humans, their synthetic alternatives (zeranol, melengestrol acetate, and trenbolone acetate) have been approved by the VDD for use in Canadian beef production. Studies show that the contribution of hormones from beef consumption is minuscule compared to the quantities produced naturally in the human body. For comparison, an adult male will produce 136,000 ng of estrogen on a given day; whereas the estrogen levels present in a 6-ounce serving of beef from a treated animal is only approximately 3.8 ng. In other words, a human being will produce almost 36,000 times the amount of estrogen in one day that would be present in a piece of beef produced with the growth hormones. Thus, current scientific evidence is insufficient to support the hypothesis that any diseases are caused by ingested hormones due to hormonal substance use in animals. However, the differences between levels in treated and non-treated animals were deemed significant enough for the EU to ban imports of U.S. beef.

== Effects of feed on health ==
Flax seeds suppress inflammatory effects from bovine respiratory disease (BRD) often affecting stressed cattle during transport and processing. BRD can lead to lung tissue damage and impair the performance of the cattle leading to a low final body mass at slaughter, or premature death.

== Effects of feed on product ==
=== Marbling and fats ===
Most grass-fed beef is leaner than feedlot beef, lacking marbling, which lowers the fat content and caloric value of the meat. Meat from grass-fed cattle has higher levels of conjugated linoleic acid (CLA) and the omega-3 fatty acids, ALA, EPA, and DHA.

A study showed that tissue lipids of North American and African ruminants were similar to pasture-fed cattle, but dissimilar to grain-fed cattle. The lipid composition of wild ruminant tissues may serve as a model for dietary lipid recommendations in treating and preventing chronic disease.

=== Dairy ===
In 2021, food management system expert Sylvain Charlebois remarked on the industry's use of palm oil, given as palmitic acid supplements, to augment the output of milk product: they "are marketed as a way to increase milk output and boost fat content" but a "review by the Dairy Research and Extension Consortium of Alberta found that butter made from cows fed palm oil remains difficult to spread at room temperature." Consumers were dismayed because the physical characteristics of the dairy products had undergone a significant change, notably in increased hardness and increased melting point of the palm oil supplemented butter, although an item published in The Globe and Mail attempted to blame the consumer for the actions of the producer. Charlebois noted that this was not beneficial to the consumer, who was surprised and had not been notified of the social contract variation to his disadvantage.

=== Taste ===
The cow's diet affects the flavor of the resultant meat and milk. A 2003 Colorado State University study found that 80% of consumers in the Denver-Colorado area preferred the taste of United States corn-fed beef to Australian grass-fed beef, and negligible difference in taste preference compared to Canadian barley-fed beef, though the cattle's food was not the only difference in the beef tested, nor is Denver a representative sample of the world beef market, so the results are inconclusive.

Remarkably, in some circumstances, cattle are fed wine or beer. It is believed that this improves the taste of the beef. This technique has been used both in Japan and France.

=== Nutrition ===
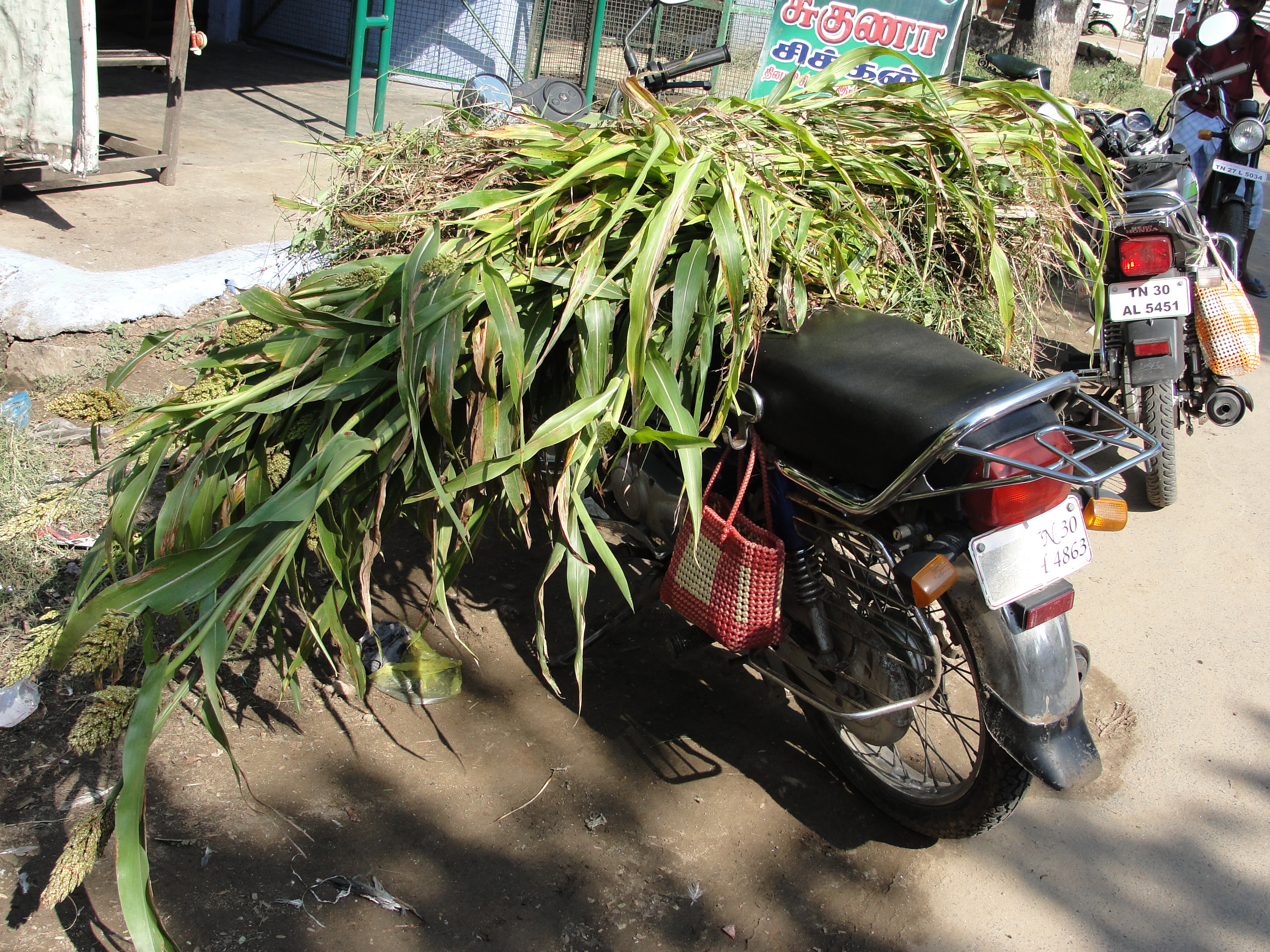
A scene of sorghum transportation

Animal products for human consumption from animals raised on pasture have shown nutritional differences from those of animals raised on other feedstuffs.

=== Health ===
==== E. coli ====
Diet composition is thought to affect the level of shigatoxigenic and verotoxigenic Escherichia coli but research up to 2017 is inconsistent and did not show clear trends. A June 2025 study indicated the safety implications were not yet fully understood, and found some additional evidence, though noting their limited sample and variability. FSNS, an industry safety lab, also argued that the evidence is inconclusive and that all meat should be cooked to a safe minimum internal temperature of 160 °F (71 °C).

==== Bovine spongiform encephalopathy ====
Meat and bone meal can be a risk factor for bovine spongiform encephalopathy (BSE), when healthy animals consume tainted tissues from infected animals. People concerned about Creutzfeldt–Jakob disease (CJD), which is also a spongiform encephalopathy, may favor grass-fed cattle for this reason. In the United States, this risk is relatively low as feeding of protein sources from any ruminant to another ruminant has been banned since 1997. The problem becomes more complicated as other feedstuffs containing animal by-products are still allowed to be fed to other non-ruminants (chickens, cats, dogs, horses, pigs, etc.). Therefore, at a feed mill mixing feed for pigs, for instance, there is still the possibility of cross-contamination of feed going to cattle. Since only a tiny amount of the contaminating prion begins the cascading brain disease, any amount of mixed feed could cause many animals to become infected. This was the only traceable link among the cattle with BSE in Canada that led to the recent US embargo of Canadian beef. No cases of BSE have been reported so far in Australia. This is largely due to Australia's strict quarantine and biosecurity rules that prohibit beef imports from countries known to be infected with BSE.

However, according to a report filed in The Australian on February 25, 2010, those rules were suddenly relaxed and the process to submit beef products from known BSE-infected countries was allowed (pending an application process). But less than a week later, Tony Burke, the Australian Minister For Agriculture, Fisheries and Forestry overturned the decision and placed a 'two year stop' on all fresh and chilled beef products destined for Australia from BSE known countries of origin, thereby relaxing fears held by Australians that contaminated US beef would find its way onto Australian supermarket shelves after a long absence.

Soybean meal is cheap and plentiful in the United States. As a result, the use of animal byproduct feeds was never common, as it was in Europe. However, US regulations only partially prohibit the use of animal byproducts in feed. In 1997, regulations prohibited the feeding of mammalian byproducts to ruminants such as cattle and goats. However, the byproducts of ruminants can still be legally fed to pets or other livestock such as pigs and poultry such as chickens. In addition, it is legal for ruminants to be fed byproducts from some of these animals.

==== Campylobacter ====
Campylobacter, a bacterium that can cause another foodborne illness resulting in nausea, vomiting, fever, abdominal pain, headache and muscle pain, was found by Australian researchers to be carried by 58% of cattle raised in feedlots versus only 2% of pasture raised and finished cattle.

== Environmental concerns ==
For environmental reasons, a study by Burney et al. advocates intensifying agriculture by making it more productive per unit of land, instead of raising cattle on pasture. Complete adoption of farming practices like grass-fed beef production systems would increase the amount of agricultural land needed and produce more greenhouse gas emissions. In some regions, livestock grazing has degraded natural environments such as riparian areas.

Other researchers have argued that a fully grass-fed production system is not possible with current demand levels and current land available. Hayek et al. found only 27% of US beef demand could be satisfied by all pastureland, and would increase total US methane emissions by 8%. They argue reducing beef consumption is the only way to guaranteed reduced environmental impact.

== Country-specific ==
Beef production tends to be concentrated, with the top six producers—the US, the European Union, Brazil, Australia, Argentina, and Russia—accounting for about 60% of global production. Significant shifts among producers have occurred over time. Cattle production worldwide is differentiated by animal genetics and feeding methods, resulting in differing quality types. Cattle are basically residual claimants to crop or land resources. Those countries with excess or low-value land tend to grass-feed their cattle herds, while those countries with excess feed grains, such as the U.S. and Canada, finish cattle with a grain ration. Grain-fed cattle have more internal fat (i.e., marbling) which results in a more tender meat than forage-fed cattle of a similar age. In some Asian countries such as Japan, which is not a grain-surplus country, tastes and preferences have encouraged feeding grain to cattle, but at a high cost since the grain must be imported.

=== Canada ===
The majority of beef cattle in Ontario are finished on a corn (maize)-based diet, whereas Western Canadian beef is finished on a barley-based diet. This rule is not absolute, however, as producers in both regions will alter the mix of feed grains according to changes in feed prices. Research by the Ontario government claims that, while Alberta beef producers have organized a successful marketing campaign promoting Alberta's barley-fed beef, corn-fed and barley-fed beef have a similar cost, quality, and taste.

Regulations on veterinary drug use in food animals and drug-residue testing programs ensure that the product in the grocery store is free of residue from antibiotics or synthetic hormones used in livestock.

The Animal Nutrition Association of Canada has developed a comprehensive Hazard Analysis Critical Control Points (HACCP) system for animal feed production called Feed Assure. This mandatory HACCP-based program includes a requirement for independent audits of feed mills including production processes and record keeping. The Canadian Cattlemen's Association has also developed a HACCP based on-farm food safety program.

A complete HACCP system is mandatory for all federally inspected establishments. These systems include prerequisite programs, which are general procedures or good manufacturing practices that enhance food safety for all meat production processes. HACCP plans build on this foundation and are designed to control potential hazards for specific production processes.

==== Alberta beef ====
Alberta has become the center of the western Canadian beef industry and has 70% of the feedlot capacity and 70% of the beef processing capacity in Canada.

The Canadian province of Alberta has a very large land area (similar to Texas) and has more than 210,000 km^{2} (81,000 sq mi) of agricultural land, or about four times as much as Ontario. Because much of the land is better suited for cattle grazing than crop growing, it raises 40 percent of the cattle in Canada—about five million head. The other three western provinces are also well-endowed with land fit for grazing, so nearly 90 percent of Canadian beef cattle are raised in Alberta and the other western provinces. Alberta is outside the Corn Belt because the climate is generally too cool and too dry to grow corn for grain. The adjacent western provinces and northern US states are similar, so the use of corn as cattle feed has been limited at these northern latitudes. As a result, few cattle are raised on corn as a feed. The majority are raised on grass and finished on cold-tolerant grains such as barley. This has become a marketing feature of the beef.

The Alberta beef label found on some beef is not an indication of origin; this is a brand that only indicates that the beef was processed in Alberta. A percentage of the cattle have been raised in other western provinces or in the northwestern United States. These cattle are generally processed similarly, and are said to be distinct from the typically corn-fed beef produced in most of the US and Ontario. Under World Trade Organization rules, all of the beef produced in Alberta can be considered to be Alberta beef.

=== United States ===
According to the United States Department of Agriculture (USDA) there are 25–33 million feed cattle moving through custom and commercial cattle feed yards annually. The monthly USDA "Cattle on Feed Report" is available for public viewing.

==== Labelling ====
The USDA's Agricultural Marketing Service (AMS) released a revised proposal for a grass-fed meat label for its process-verified labelling program in May 2006. This established a standard definition for the "grass-fed" claim which required continuous access to pasture and animals not being fed grain or grain-based products. The Union of Concerned Scientists, which in general supported the labelling proposal, claimed that the label, which contained the clause "consumption of grain in the immature stage is acceptable", allowed for "feed harvesting or stockpiling methods that might include significant amounts of grain" because the term "immature" was not clearly defined. The label was revoked by the USDA on January 12, 2016, claiming it had no jurisdiction over what should be FDA regulations.

Until 2015, the US had mandatory country-of-origin labeling (COOL) rules requiring that foreign beef be labelled as such under a complicated set of rules, but in 2015 the World Trade Organization ruled that the US was a violation of international trade law, so the US law was repealed.

== See also ==
- Free range
- Fodder
- Hay
