= Barry Sherman =

Canadian businessman (1942–2017)

Barry Sherman CM
- Sherman in 2017
- Born: Bernard Charles Sherman; February 25, 1942; Toronto, Ontario, Canada
- Died: December 13, 2017 (aged 75); Toronto, Ontario, Canada
- Cause of death: Homicide by strangulation
- Education: University of Toronto (BASc); Massachusetts Institute of Technology (PhD)
- Occupation: Businessman
- Known for: Pharmaceutical industry
- Title: Chairman and CEO of Apotex
- Spouse: Honey Reich (m. 1971–2017)
- Children: 4
- Family: Louis Lloyd Winter (uncle)

Bernard Charles "Barry" Sherman, CM (February 25, 1942 – December 13, 2017) was a Canadian businessman and philanthropist who was chairman and CEO of Apotex Inc. With an estimated net worth of US$3.2 billion at the time of his death, according to Forbes, Sherman was the 12th-wealthiest man in Canada. Another publication, Canadian Business, stated his fortune at CA$4.77 billion, ranking him the 15th richest man in Canada.

Sherman, a University of Toronto graduate with a doctorate in engineering from the Massachusetts Institute of Technology, got his start in the pharmaceutical business in the 1960s, when the estate of his uncle Louis Lloyd Winter let him run Empire Laboratories, the late uncle's drug company. This eventually led Sherman to form Apotex, where he earned a reputation among both competitors and government regulators for extreme combativeness, often including litigation. Sherman's four cousins, who were supposed to have received five-percent stakes in Empire, later sued Sherman unsuccessfully over his sale of the company.

In 1971, Sherman married his wife Honey, who would later rise to prominence in Canadian philanthropy, serving on the boards of several prominent charities. The two were found dead in their home in late 2017. Initially investigators from the Toronto Police Service considered the deaths a murder-suicide, which was later revised to homicide after further investigation and disputes from the media. In April 2019, the police said they had a "working theory" of the case and an "idea of what happened", and as of May 2022 the investigation was "active and ongoing"; no suspects or persons of interest have been named since the murder occurred.

== Early life ==
Barry Sherman was born into a Jewish family in Toronto to Herbert Dick "Hyman" Sherman, a business partner for a zipper company, and Sara "Sarah" Sherman, an occupational therapist after her husband's death. His grandparents from both sides had fled persecution of Jews in Russia and Poland. Sherman was ten years old when his father died from a heart attack.

Sherman won a national physics contest while attending the Forest Hill Collegiate Institute and graduated with top marks. In the summer of 1958, he signed up for a Canadian Army organized student militia, but found he didn't like submitting to authority. The same year, he entered the University of Toronto's (U of T) engineering science program, at age 16 he was one of the youngest students ever to join the University's Engineering Science program. Sherman later wrote that he chose that program specifically because it was reputedly the university's hardest.

During summers, Sherman worked for his uncle, Louis Lloyd Winter, at Winter's company Empire Laboratories, then Canada's largest wholly owned pharmaceutical company. Sherman worked as a driver, primarily picking up urine samples for pregnancy tests. When his uncle would travel, Sherman often helped watch over the operations.

Sherman graduated from U of T in 1964 with the highest honours in his class, and received the university's Governor General's Award for his thesis. He then enrolled at the Massachusetts Institute of Technology, from which he received a PhD in astrophysics in 1967.

== Career ==
Sherman later recalled that his interest in business as a career was piqued when he was aged 10, when his father took him to work at his zipper factory in downtown Toronto and gave Sherman some zippers to count and box. He later wrote that his father was surprised at how well he did, filling "more than would have been done in the same time by any of his paid staff". He also recalled feeling insulted when his father counted them.

In 1967, after completing his PhD, Sherman purchased Empire Laboratories from the executor of the estate of Louis Lloyd Winter and his wife, Beverley. The couple had died seventeen days apart in November 1965, leaving four orphaned young children: Paul Timothy, Jeffrey Andrew, Kerry Joel Dexter, and Dana Charles. Empire had been the first company to secure the compulsory rights to manufacture Hoffmann-La Roche's Valium (diazepam) in Canada, and was one of the country's largest manufacturers of Pfizer's Vibramycin (doxycycline), Upjohn Company's Orinase (tolbutamide), and the dietary sweetener saccharin. Winter's estate allowed Sherman to buy a majority stake in Empire and run it only on the condition that the four Winter children be allowed to work for the company when they reached 21, with the option to buy five-percent stakes in the company two years later, with 15-year royalties on four of its patented products. The agreement would be voided if Sherman sold Empire.

That voiding happened in 1969. Sherman worked out a deal to swap shares with Empire's largest customer that put it in control of the company. In 1970 he invested in the American firm Barr Laboratories with US-based partners, became its largest shareholder and president. He would eventually control a third of Barr's stock. Barr won the first rights to manufacture generic versions of Eli Lilly's Prozac. Today, Barr is a part of Teva Pharmaceutical Industries, the world's largest generic drugmaker, following Teva's acquisition of Barr in 2008.

In January 1972, Sherman and Ulster Limited sold Empire to the Quebec-based Canadian operations of publicly traded International Chemical and Nuclear Corporation (ICN) of California, for 57,000 shares (Valeant Pharmaceuticals). This transaction voided his arrangement with the Winter estate. A year later, Sherman started Apotex with a few former Empire personnel; it was incorporated in 1974. This privately owned and Sherman-controlled company claims to be Canada's largest domestic pharmaceutical manufacturer. Sherman also became involved in nutraceutical manufacturing and other businesses, founding the National Institute of Nutrition (NION) with Richard Kashenberg. He later sold NION to Schiff and continued on to Apotex.

By 2016, Apotex employed over 10,000 people as one of Canada's largest drug manufacturers, with over 260 products selling in over 115 countries. Revenues were about $1.5 billion annually.

=== Other businesses ===
Sherman also personally invested in other, non-pharmaceutical businesses. Often these had dubious prospects and turned out to be fraudulent schemes. For example, Sherman put money into a yacht-chartering company which turned out to be a shell corporation that had never bought any yachts. Later, he bought a majority stake in a company that sold a nutritional supplement marketed by American fraudster Kevin Trudeau. In 1996, when US regulators began investigating the fraud claims that would later lead to Trudeau's imprisonment, Sherman sold half his stake to the Apotex Foundation. Sherman's associates felt he was often too generous and trusting with these businesses, failing to do proper due diligence.

For fifteen years, Sherman partnered with Frank D'Angelo, a fruit-juice maker who was trying to branch out into other businesses. The two produced the Cheetah Power Surge energy drink and started Steelback Brewery; when D'Angelo Brands went bankrupt in 2007, Sherman lost C$100 million. Sherman continued backing D'Angelo's filmmaking venture even after D'Angelo was arrested on sexual assault and obstruction of justice charges, later dropped, in 2009. Sherman's money financed all eight films D'Angelo had made through 2018.

In the late 2010s, Sherman worked with another man later convicted of fraud, Shaun Rootenberg. The two had been introduced by a mutual friend, Cineplex Odeon co-founder Myron Gottlieb, who had met Rootenberg in prison following his conviction for fraud in the collapse of Livent. Rootenberg persuaded Sherman to invest in his development of an online trivia game; Sherman later filed a lawsuit against Rootenberg, alleging the latter had simply pocketed the money.

== Personal life ==
Sherman married Honey Reich in 1971, a fellow U of T graduate of Austrian nationality who was the daughter of Polish Jewish Holocaust survivors. The couple had four children: a son, Jonathon, and three daughters, Lauren, Alexandra and Kaelen.

While Sherman socialized regularly with Honey, he was known to his friends and family as a workaholic. At the social events they attended, she was more outgoing while he often kept to himself and discussed mainly his businesses. The Sherman family frequented a ski club on winter weekends, but while Honey and the children availed themselves of the trails, Sherman remained in the lodge poring over documents. Similarly, Sherman did not play golf and would spend vacations reviewing business material.

Even as his fortune grew, Sherman drove his cars until they reached an advanced state of disrepair; a friend worried that one, a Ford Mustang, was so decrepit that it was leaking carbon monoxide into the passenger compartment. For his 50th birthday, Honey gave him a red sports car with a bow on it in front of assembled guests. He asked her to take it back, and she did.

=== Philanthropy ===
Sherman, with his wife, donated a record $50 million to the United Jewish Appeal, and other Jewish charities, despite Sherman himself being an atheist. The couple provided funds to build a major addition to the Baycrest Health Sciences geriatric centre, and to other community centres in the Toronto area. The couple were also major donors to the United Way. The Apotex Foundation had donated over $50 million worth of medicines to disaster zones since 2007. Sherman personally often loaned money to Apotex employees who needed help.

After his death, Maclean's found that Sherman himself, through one of the many companies he controlled, had made large donations to several of the foundations he had set up in his or Apotex's name. Under Canadian tax law, this entitled him to an equivalent tax credit. The foundations were then allowed to loan him back money and did, loaning him almost the total of the $6 million he gave, an unusually high amount. The leader of a private charity watchdog group said Sherman was "using his foundations as a piggy bank" and called on Canadian lawmakers to change the law.

== Reputation and personality ==
Sherman had a mixed reputation, or what the National Post called "Two Legacies". Sherman and his wife were described by Toronto Mayor John Tory as "kind, good people", and he was widely praised for his philanthropic giving. On the other hand, Morton Shulman, a physician and former member of the Ontario Parliament who late in his life fought Sherman over drug development, called him "the only person I have ever met with no redeeming features whatsoever". A Bloomberg writer reporting on Sherman's death said that some rival generic drug company executives used "unprintable" language to describe him.

University of Ottawa law professor Amir Attaran described Sherman as "a deplorable human being" in reference to his business practices, claiming that he gouged Canadians with high drug prices: "Canadians pay more for generic drugs than almost every other country. He sought to manipulate our system to enrich himself and impoverish Canadian patients who used his drugs." Attaran accused Sherman of crossing ethical lines concerning intellectual property rights to "fight as many as 100 battles at a time in court to challenge drug patents and make way for Apotex's generic prescriptions" with little end benefit to consumers. By contrast, Sherman saw Apotex as a force for good, saying, "If we're thieves, we're Robin Hoods."

As told in Jeffrey Robinson's 2001 book Prescription Games: Money, Ego and Power Inside the Pharmaceutical Industry, Sherman himself acknowledged the long-running conflict between Apotex and the major pharmaceutical companies over drug patents, saying, "The branded drug companies hate us. They have private investigators on us all the time. The thought once came to my mind: why didn't they just hire someone to knock me off?" Private investigators working for the German company Bayer AG, one of the world's largest drug companies, reportedly considered planting illegal drugs in Sherman's car during an operation to lure Apotex employees into informing on whether the company was knowingly infringing Bayer's patents.

=== Litigation ===
Apotex was much more likely than other Canadian companies to respond to adverse regulatory decisions by suing the government agencies involved. At the time of Sherman's death, the company had filed an estimated 1,200 cases against the government in Federal Court; a spokesman for Health Canada, named as a defendant in dozens of Apotex's suits, complained that the company's litigiousness had cost Canadian taxpayers millions of dollars in legal fees. "It was intimidating to come back from lunch and find an urgent memo on your desk saying you've got to get over to Federal Court because Sherman was at it again," recalled Michele Brill-Edwards, former Health Canada head of drug regulation. "He quickly demonstrated that in fact you can bully the government and you can intimidate." One of Apotex's lawsuits, over the company's application to make a generic version of the antidepressant Trazodone, took thirty years until the Federal Court of Appeal ruled that the government had mishandled it. Sherman himself once told employees that Apotex was primarily a legal company that sold medications on the side. After his death, Maclean's wrote: "He was a billionaire driven to litigation less by money than something more primal: a sense of righteous certitude that propelled him to prevail at any cost."

Competitors and regulators were not the only targets of Apotex's litigation. In the 1990s, following an extension of patents that made generic drugs less profitable to produce, the company began exploring making branded drugs of its own. One of them was deferiprone, a potential treatment for the blood disorder thalassemia. Trials were overseen by U of T hematologist Dr. Nancy Olivieri at The Hospital for Sick Children in Toronto. By 1998, Olivieri had serious concerns as to whether the drug was effective or safe, and broke a confidentiality agreement with Apotex to publish her findings. Apotex responded by attempting to damage her reputation and filing a lawsuit; U of T took the company's side rather than risk the loss of a $20 million donation for a planned research centre and removed Olivieri from her position as head of a research program on hemoglobin disorders. Eventually Olivieri regained her position after years of her own litigation; the incident helped inspire John le Carré's novel The Constant Gardener.

In 2011, Sherman's cousins, the Winter children, sued him for allegedly never paying them royalties and equity in Apotex, contending that he had used the proceeds from the 1972 sale of Empire Laboratories to purchase Apotex in 1973. The cousins sought a twenty-percent interest in Apotex or damages of $1 billion. Sherman responded by withdrawing millions of dollars in financial assistance to his cousins. The Winter children contended that Sherman "had offered the financial assistance in the first place in order to make the cousins dependent on him, and to keep them from learning about their rights to the business", an allegation Sherman denied. In September 2017, an Ontario Superior Court justice ruled against the cousins, saying the case was "wishful thinking, and beyond fanciful." At the time of the judgement, a lawyer for the cousins said they would appeal, though no appeal occurred. Sherman died a few months later.

In 1996, after the Shermans' North York home was completed following five years of construction, the couple was dissatisfied with the work done on it. In particular, they claimed that the garage, a structure with a tennis court on top and a basement lap pool and hot tub, was faulty; Sherman called it a "disaster". He and his wife filed twelve separate suits against all the contractors; ultimately they would recover almost the entire estimated $2.3 million cost of building the house through favourable judgements.

A partial draft of his unpublished memoir, called Legacy of Thoughts, was submitted as part of Sherman's motion for summary judgment in the lawsuit brought by his orphaned cousins. He described the manuscript as his observations on philosophy, Canadian politics and the pharmaceutical industry. Sherman did not believe in God, free will, altruism or morality. "I find no inconsistency in holding intellectually that life has no meaning, while the same time being highly motivated to survive and to achieve", he once said.

Sherman was targeted by the Canadian wing of the Jewish Defense League, a group on the FBI's terrorist watchlist, and had been sued by Israel's largest generic-drug maker, Teva Pharmaceutical Industries.

=== Lobbying ===
Sherman was also known for the vigour of his lobbying efforts. When Prime Minister Brian Mulroney's government passed a law that extended patent protection for brand-name drug makers, Sherman complained that it would be destructive to smaller generic drugmakers and began supporting Jean Chrétien and the Liberal Party, who had promised to review the law if they took power in the 1993 general election. Sherman also donated millions of dollars to U of T for a research centre, contributions he withdrew when the letters the university wrote to the Mulroney government opposing the new regulations did not result in those regulations being withdrawn.

In 2006, still unsatisfied, Sherman supported the campaign of Joe Volpe to become Liberal leader. He and other Apotex executives gave $108,000 to Volpe's campaign, all giving the legal maximum of $5,400. This caused some controversy when some of those donations were found to have come from minor children of the executives, although ultimately Elections Canada ruled that no laws were broken.

At the time of his death, Sherman, legally registered as a lobbyist, was under investigation because of a fundraiser he had held for Justin Trudeau in April 2015, allegedly contrary to Canada's lobbying rules. Sherman filed a lawsuit in May 2016 attempting to quash the investigation before it was finished, a legally unprecedented move in Canadian history. "There is basis to conclude that Mr. Sherman is in breach of ... the Lobbyists' Code of Conduct as a consequence of his involvement in the organization of a fundraising event for the (Liberal Party)," according to Phil McIntosh, director of investigations at the Office of the Lobby Commissioner. If that had been proven, Sherman would have been banned from lobbying for five years.

== Move ==
In 2017, the Shermans decided to sell their longtime home on Old Colony Road in North York and move to a new house they were building in Forest Hill, closer to downtown Toronto, where many of their friends and business associates lived. Honey, who according to D'Angelo had initiated the move, had purchased a corner lot in November 2016; the Shermans planned to demolish the existing house on the site. Plans for a replacement on file with the city called for a 16,000-square-foot (1,500 m^{2}) house with features such as a central swimming pool with 41-foot (12 m) retractable skylight and living quarters for staff. The fifteen variances required, including the house's 47.6-metre (156 ft) depth, more than twice that allowed in the city's zoning, and a car stacker in the garage, were approved in June 2017.

Construction of the house, and Sherman's ultimately successful effort to recover legal fees from the Winters after their suit was decided in his favour, preoccupied the couple later in the year. They put the North York home on the market, asking almost $7 million, at the end of November, even though construction had not started on the Forest Hill house. On December 12, Honey missed a meeting of the Baycrest Centre Foundation board without notifying them beforehand, which was unusual for her. Reached by email, she said she was "dealing with some stuff".

== Death ==
On December 13, 2017, late in the afternoon, the Shermans met in Barry's office at Apotex headquarters, where they went over some design changes to the new house. Honey was planning to leave for a holiday vacation in Miami a few days later; Barry was to join her a week later. It was the last time the couple were seen alive. Later that evening, after returning home, Sherman sent his Apotex staff a routine email about a drug the company was developing. He did not call anyone during that night, which they said was unusual because he frequently suffered from insomnia. The next day, December 14, he did not show up at Apotex; again, this was out of the ordinary for him.

The next morning, December 15, neither Barry nor Honey was expected to be at home in the morning. The cleaning staff had already let themselves in with a recently installed lockbox when a pair of real estate agents arrived around mid-morning with a couple interested in the property. After showing them around the main storey, the agents took the couple downstairs to the lap pool and hot tub. There, they discovered Barry's and Honey's bodies on the floor next to the pool. Both of their necks were tied with leather belts to a metal railing slightly over a metre high around the pool. Barry was seated, his legs crossed, on the pool deck; Honey was on her side with a bruise on her face. Coats were pulled down over their shoulders restraining their arms; they were facing away from the water and fully clothed.

On the second anniversary of the case, the Toronto Star reported that the positions the bodies were found in nearly matched those of two 1970s-era "junk" sculptures of human figures posed sitting on speakers in the basement. Barry's right leg was crossed over his left, just like one, however Honey's legs were not in front of her as those on the corresponding sculpture had been.

The Star also reported that Honey's cell phone was found in a bathroom that, according to friends, she never used, suggesting she might have gone there in an attempt to summon help but was overpowered in the process. Similarly, Barry's gloves, as well as paperwork related to an inspection of the house, were left on the floor just outside the garage door, on the way to the basement pool. A window had been left open to allow a recently painted room to air out, and a basement door was unlocked, as apparently the Shermans frequently left it. Someone who may have known this, as well as the interior layout of the house, may have been able to escape through a neighbouring back yard after the crime, police said.

=== Investigation ===
The police were called. The deaths were treated as "suspicious" and the Toronto Police Service Homicide Squad took the lead in the investigation, because it was "most experienced in dealing with sudden unexpected deaths". Post-mortem examinations showed the cause of both deaths was "ligature neck compression", which is ligature strangulation caused by binding or tying. Ligature strangulation is usually distinguished from hanging by the strangling force being something other than the person's own body weight.

Toronto Police Service had previously told the news media that there was no indication of forced entry into the Sherman home and that their investigation did not include a search for any suspects. Although there was no note left by the deceased, police sources told the Toronto Star on December 15 or 16, 2017, that they were "probing the possibility that they were a murder–suicide". Honey suffered face injuries and Barry did not, fuelling initial police speculation she was the intended victim and Barry was not.

In response, anonymous sources noted that the house had several entrances and claimed that both Barry and Honey would have been likely to let someone in who asked for help. The Sherman children issued a statement urging the police to conduct a thorough criminal investigation and chastised the police for leaking a murder-suicide theory. They also contacted Toronto lawyer Brian Greenspan to retain a private investigator to look into the deaths. He hired Tom Klett, a retired Toronto Police detective who has worked in the homicide, drug, and intelligence bureaus. The family also hired Dr. David Chiasson, the retired chief forensic pathologist for Ontario, to conduct another autopsy.

The second autopsy established that the couple's cause of death was homicide.

In January 2018, the Toronto Star published an exclusive report based on anonymous sources from the family's investigation team who said that the deaths were murders: the couple was strangled by belts after their hands were tied. These investigators had not yet gained access to the Sherman home. "People providing information for this story are not identified as they were not authorized to discuss the case," according to the Star. When contacted by a reporter, a Toronto Police spokesman reiterated the position that they were treating the deaths as "suspicious". On January 26, Toronto Police advised the news media that their investigation concluded that the couple had been killed in a targeted attack. At the time, they would not discuss any possible suspects, but planned to interview everyone who had access to the home prior to the deaths via the lockbox that was previously installed by the real estate agent. The police investigation has encountered resistance at Apotex headquarters, with a police spokesman saying "Legal complexities in some executions have been challenging given the litigious nature of Barry Sherman's businesses, in particular the search and seizure of electronics in Barry Sherman's workspace at Apotex".

In September, detectives obtained seven search warrants in addition to the 21 previously obtained. Detective Dennis Yim told a court that "investigators are methodically reviewing material and pursuing different investigative avenues". By the end of the following month, police had obtained 37 warrants related to the investigation. Lawyer Brian Greenspan announced that the family had offered a $10 million reward in the couple's homicide investigation for any information that leads to the arrest and prosecution of a suspect. At the same time, he complained about the police investigation, claiming that it had failed to collect important evidence. Police Chief Mark Saunders later told the news media that a forensic pathologist has been working on the case, in addition to over 50 officers, interviewing 200 witnesses and collecting over 2,000 hours of video surveillance from neighbouring homes. When asked if police would be willing to work with the independent experts to be convened by Greenspan, Saunders said he would if the group were to be accepted in a court proceeding.

On April 25, 2019, the Toronto Police said they had a "working theory" of the case, and an "idea of what happened."

At the end of 2019, the private investigators working for the family closed their investigation. The following month, Star reporter Kevin Donovan, who had just published a book, The Billionaire Murders, about the case, disclosed that investigators had revised their timeline of the case. While previous statements had suggested police believed the couple had been killed early on December 15, they now said the murders had occurred two days earlier, within hours of the Shermans returning home on the night of the 13th.

In April 2022, Toronto Police said the case was "unfortunately old", still in the investigation phase, and no charges have been filed against anyone. The Toronto Police asked the court to seal case documents from the press to protect the integrity of the investigation.

In December 2022, their son increased the reward to $35 million.

=== Motives and suspects ===
There has been speculation about who might have been responsible, particularly given Sherman's many business associates with criminal records and those who had been angered by his actions. He himself had acknowledged that an attempt could be made on his life. "For a thousand bucks paid to the right person, you can probably get someone killed", he told Jeffrey Robinson in an interview for his book in the late 1990s. "Perhaps I'm surprised that hasn't happened."

At the time of the homicides, Sherman had just won a ruling that the Winters owed him $300,000 in legal fees, less than he had asked for, for their lawsuit, itself dismissed three months earlier. After telling Bloomberg that he'd been informed he was a "prime suspect" and consulting with his lawyer, Kerry Winter allowed that he had not only the motive to kill his cousin but the opportunity, since he was working at the time as a construction supervisor and could set his own hours. He admitted to The Fifth Estate that he had imagined killing Sherman but says that he did not, and was watching Peaky Blinders on Netflix, then attending a Cocaine Anonymous meeting that night. (Note: Winter has also claimed in several interviews that at one point in the 1990s Barry, with whom he was then on good terms, was going through a difficult period with Honey and asked Kerry if he knew of someone who could kill her; he went as far as to make preliminary contact with some organized crime figures he was acquainted with. The Sherman children have called that doubtful and hurtful.)

Two weeks before the murders, Barry Sherman asked his son, Jonathon Sherman, to repay him tens of millions of dollars that Jonathon had borrowed for his storage business. Jonathon explained this was to get his father through a difficult financial situation, and his father committed to future funding when Barry's finances improved. The two had a close relationship both professionally and personally.

According to documents released by the court in January 2022, Barry owed $1 billion to other companies leading up to his death, which he said was not going to pay. Furthermore, the documents revealed the estate of the Shermans is somehow part of the murder investigation.

Also mentioned as possibly having a motive to kill Sherman is Frank D'Angelo, given the long history between the two and the latter man's checkered legal history. In his interview with Bloomberg, he said "The worst thing that could have happened to Frank D'Angelo is Barry dying" and expressed regret that he had not been able to save a man he regarded as a close friend. He believed that "somebody came to make Barry an offer he couldn't refuse, and he refused".

In November 2020, the Toronto police said that they had identified a 'person of interest'; then two days later clarified that it could be one person, or multiple people.

On December 14, 2021, Toronto police released security camera footage of a suspect. In the roughly 20-second video, a person dressed in dark clothing can be seen walking down a sidewalk on a snow-covered night in the neighbourhood. "The timing of this individual's appearance is in line with when we believe the murders took place," Detective Brandon Price told reporters. "Based on this evidence we are classifying this individual as a suspect."

Court documents released in January 2022 included statements by Honey Sherman's sister, Mary Shechtman, who suggested the person responsible for the murders was "making a statement" and that she believed the motive for the killings may have been religion. "The Shermans were strong supporters of Israel and Honey was very vocal about being Jewish," Shechtman said. "There were a lot of people of a certain ethnicity going through the house at a certain time and Honey would use phrases that were not politically correct." Shechtman said that six months before the murders, Honey had gone to a lecture "about stopping money from getting into Muslim fundamentalists' hands." In Shechtman's statement to police, she said Honey's belief was that "if the money were to be cut off from [Muslim fundamentalists] they could bankrupt them and therefore the money could not be used for terror." Shechtman told police she believed "Barry was providing funding for this."

== Legacy ==
In June 2019, people close to the Shermans said Barry had planned to give to charity or invest much of his fortune. Trustees for the Sherman family fought to keep details of the estate secret. In Canada, court documents and related proceedings—including files that deal with an estate after death—are public. An Ontario Superior Court judge applied a "protective order" to the file, but the Toronto Star, a newspaper and media company in Canada, appealed and won. The family appealed to the Supreme Court, but in June 2021, the Supreme Court upheld the unsealing.

In 2020, Sherman's daughter Alex Krawczyk established the Honey & Barry Sherman Legacy Foundation to honour her parents' memory, and further their unfinished philanthropic aims. Alex Krawczyk is a registered nurse and philanthropist who leads two charitable foundations, the Krawczyk Family Foundation and the Honey & Barry Sherman Legacy Foundation.

In 2023, Crave announced the production and broadcast of Billionaire Murders, a documentary television series exploring the case.

In 2023, Jonathon Sherman, the only son of the Sherman couple, announced he was donating $52 million to the Toronto Jewish community so it can build the Honey and Barry Memorial Arena on the grounds of an existing Jewish community campus in Vaughan, Ontario. It will consist of two NHL-sized hockey rinks and supporting facilities.

The house where the murders took place was demolished in May 2019, and the land was purchased in 2020 by a young woman nearby, who put it on the market in 2023 at a "significant price tag". The address has also been changed.

== See also ==
- List of Canadian Jews
- List of MIT alumni
- List of University of Toronto alumni
- List of unsolved murders (2000–present)
