= Louis Lloyd Winter =

Canadian businessman (1924–1965)

- Born: 17 March 1924; Toronto, Ontario, Canada
- Died: 5 November 1965 (aged 41)
- Occupation: President of Empire Laboratories
- Known for: Pharmaceutic industry
- Family: Bernard Sherman (nephew)

Louis Lloyd Winter (March 17, 1924 – November 5, 1965) was a Canadian entrepreneur and one of the pioneers of Canada's generic pharmaceutical industry.

He was born on St. Patrick's Day in Toronto, Ontario to Polish immigrants in downtown Toronto. By the time of his sudden death in 1965, he had built Empire Laboratories into the largest pharmaceutical business in Canada.

== Winter Laboratories ==
Louis Winter was the youngest of six children. He attended Harbord Collegiate in Toronto where he made the honour roll. He was accepted into the biochemistry program at the University of Toronto, and graduated with a master's degree in the subject.

In 1948 he borrowed $10,000 from his father, Abraham, and opened his first venture, Winter Laboratories. The business was based in the family's garage processing blood work and pregnancy tests for local pharmacies, doctors' offices and medical clinics. With just his school mate, Toby Johansen, to handle initial sales, the company quickly outgrew its space and moved into a house near the University of Toronto's main campus. The business continued to expand; Winter Laboratories leased the basement of the Mothercraft Building on Bloor Street, where Rochdale College was built in 1968.

Louis Winter recognized that brand name pharmaceutical drugs and popular over-the-counter medications were expensive, and that many consumers were having a difficult time purchasing their required prescriptions. He explored and researched, having suspected that many of these products could be synthesized, locally manufactured and formally licensed under Canada's brand protecting Patent Act through its Compulsory Licensing Act (1923) provisions. Popular pharmaceutical products could be locally manufactured and packaged into their required dosage forms by adhering to Health Canada's strict efficacy requirements, with thorough testing confirmation, for a fraction of their retail cost. Winter investigated and secured this prospect further with the Canadian government authorities, and he discovered from both Health Canada and Industry Canada and the respective Patent Office the necessary requirements to establish a Generic Pharmaceutical Business.

Canada's Health Protection Branch clarified the required strict Protocols that must be followed to permit local Canadian Manufacturing. Winter's contention that he could manufacture and license pharmaceutical products under the Compulsory Licensing Act (1923) procedures were properly followed, filed and clarified to secure respective product approvals.

Louis Lloyd Winter discovered how to establish a pharmaceutical manufacturing business providing that he adhered to the strict plant conditions and production standards required, to be regularly inspected, by Health Canada, providing that the products licensed secured their necessary efficacy performances demanded by the brand liccense owners with Health Canada's Inspection Team's collaboration, to protect consumers.

Before officially starting his own generic pharmaceutical company, on July 20, 1955, Louis Winter incorporated Anchor Serum Company of Canada Limited, after securing the exclusive Canadian rights to manufacture the product line of Anchor Serum Company of St. Louis, MO. Anchor Serum primarily specialized in supplying pharmaceuticals to veterinarians. As his manufacturing business expanded, Winter then purchased a four-story industrial building at 77 Florence Street, the former candy manufacturing facility of Jenny Lynn Chocolates, and on August 21, 1959, he incorporated Empire Laboratories Limited.

== Empire Laboratories ==
Empire Laboratories became the first Canadian pharmaceutical company that was permitted to keep its pill and product packaging exactly like its brand name counterparts, to prevent consumers from becoming confused when purchasing its lower cost generic medication alternatives, providing that Empire placed its recognizable "E" trademark identity directly on all of its products (Parke, Davis & Co. v. Empire Laboratories Ltd., [1964] S.C.R. 351). This landmark Supreme Court case was instrumental in the development of Canada's generic drug industry.

Louis Winter soon had to expand his operations and purchased a larger five-story building from the Reichmann family, the former Planter's Peanut factory at 301 Lansdowne Avenue, just two blocks from Empire's current base on Florence Street, and he added additional production, including a synthesis laboratory on the top floor for the manufacturing of saccharine, the low-calorie sweetener. Winter also purchased a printing facility which he renamed Professional Printing Services Limited from the Mount family in 1963 that was originally located at 1389 Weston Road, Toronto, and Walter and Peter Mount became Empire employees. Empire Laboratories could then provide all its independent pharmacies from coast to coast with customized prescription delivery bags, point-of-purchase displays, posters, and signage as a loyalty incentive, in an era prior to the dominance of national chain drug stores. Empire also provided medical practitioners with complimentary stationery and prescription pads. To offset these marketing costs, Empire's printing division also retained dedicated print brokers and a couple of sales representatives to ensure that the division did not operate at a loss, and it processed all of the company's product labels and plant packaging.

The Empire pharmaceutical operation became diversified and expanded, and it became one of Canada's largest pharmaceutical companies with over 100 products in its 1964 product catalog. Empire was the first Canadian firm to license and manufacture popular medications like Valium (diazepam), Orinase (tolbutamide) and Tetracyn (tetracycline). The United States market was becoming a greater focus, and the U.S. military became a client, and a special manufacturing facility was being built in Puerto Rico under PRIDCO (Puerto Rico Industrial Development Company) to ship products tariff free to the US Mainland. Lou Winter also invested in Vanguard Medical Supplies, the first Canadian mail-order based pharmaceutical business with Israel Kerzner and Murray Rubin, to service rural regions via catalog mail order, and Professional Printing Services handled all of the catalog production.

== Death ==
At age 41, Louis Winter died on November 5, 1965, at St. Joseph's Hospital in Toronto, just 17 days prior to his wife Beverley's death. Beverly had previously been hospitalized at the same facility having been diagnosed with terminal leukemia. The couple left four children under the age of seven: Paul born on December 16, 1958; Jeffrey born on May 23, 1960; Kerry born June 3, 1961; and Dana born on June 21, 1962.

== Sale of Empire Laboratories ==
Bernard (Barry) Sherman, who had lost his father on November 17, 1952, at age nine, had worked for his Uncle Lou at Empire Laboratories during his final high-school years and throughout his first three years of college while attending the University of Toronto. Upon the completion of his PhD in astrophysics at M.I.T. in 1967, Barry Sherman with his high-school friend, Joel Ulster, purchased the Empire Group of Companies on August 23, 1967. The Executor, Royal Trust, now a division of Royal Bank of Canada (RBC), processed this transaction on behalf of the infant beneficiaries of Beverley and Louis Winter. Barry Sherman would eventually launch Apotex Inc. in 1974.

To facilitate the corporate acquisition, Barry and Joel Ulster (Sherman and Ulster Limited) offered five-percent equity options to each of the four children and a fifteen-year royalty on four of its patented products (Globe and Mail, November 24, 2007). Litigation was before the courts concerning the purchase of the corporate assets and brands from the Winter children's estate, as Sherman and his partner never paid the royalties nor provided the promised equity in the businesses. In September 2017, an Ontario Superior Court justice ruled against the cousins saying the case was "wishful thinking, and beyond fanciful." At the time of the judgement, a lawyer for the cousins said they would appeal, though no appeal occurred, and Sherman died a few months later under unknown circumstances.
