= Health Products and Food Branch =

The Health Products and Food Branch (HPFB) of Health Canada manages the health-related risks and benefits of health products and food by minimizing risk factors while maximizing the safety provided by the regulatory system and providing information to Canadians so they can make healthy, informed decisions about their health.

HPFB has ten operational Directorates with direct regulatory responsibilities:

- Biologics and Genetic Therapies Directorate
- Food Directorate
- Marketed Health Products Directorate (with responsibility for post-market surveillance)
- Medical Devices Directorate
- Natural Health Products Directorate
- Office of Nutrition Policy and Promotion
- Pharmaceutical Drugs Directorate
- Policy, Planning and International Affairs Directorate
- Resource Management and Operations Directorate
- Veterinary Drugs Directorate

== Extraordinary Use New Drugs ==
Extraordinary Use New Drugs (EUNDs) is a regulatory programme under which, in times of emergency, drugs can be granted regulatory approval under the Food and Drug Act and its regulations. An EUND approved through this pathway can only be sold to federal, provincial, territorial and municipal governments. The text of the EUNDs regulations is available.

On 25 March 2011 and after the pH1N1 pandemic, amendments were made to the Food and Drug Regulations (FDR) to include a specific regulatory pathway for EUNDs. Typically, clinical trials in human subjects are conducted and the results are provided as part of the clinical information package of a New Drug Submission (NDS) to Health Canada, the federal authority that reviews the safety and efficacy of human drugs.

Health Canada recognizes that there are circumstances in which sponsors cannot reasonably provide substantial evidence demonstrating the safety and efficacy of a therapeutic product for NDS as there are logistical or ethical challenges in conducting the appropriate human clinical trials. The EUND pathway was developed to allow a mechanism for authorization of these drugs based on non-clinical and limited clinical information. A manufacturer of a new drug may file an extraordinary use new drug submission for the new drug if, under paragraph C.08.002.01(1):

(a) the new drug is intended for

- (i) emergency use in situations where persons have been exposed to a chemical, biological, radiological or nuclear substance and action is required to treat, mitigate or prevent a life-threatening or other serious disease, disorder or abnormal physical state, or its symptoms, that results, or is likely to result, from that exposure, or
- (ii) preventative use in persons who are at risk of exposure to a chemical, biological, radiological or nuclear substance that is potentially lethal or permanently disabling; and

(b) the requirements set out in paragraphs C.08.002(2)(g) and (h) cannot be met because

- (i) exposing human volunteers to the substance referred to in paragraph (a) would be potentially lethal or permanently disabling, and
- (ii) the circumstances in which exposure to the substance occurs are sporadic and infrequent.

== International agreements ==
The HPFB signed an electronic data interchange agreement with the US Food and Drug Administration in November 2003, and again in April 2004 with the Therapeutic Goods Administration of Australia. Dr Joel Lexchin found the secrecy arrangements in the memorandum of understanding to be troublesome and said that "that just makes it more difficult for the medical community to know how drugs were approved, how the data were assessed, and even what data were assessed."

In 2016, the HPFB signed an agreement with the European Directorate for the Quality of Medicines "for the exchange of information generated by the EDQM through its certification procedure and by HBFB during the course of applicable product assessments."

== See also ==
- List of food safety organisations
- Regulation of therapeutic goods
