= NPN =

NPN may refer to:

== Science and technology ==
- Next Protocol Negotiation, in computer networking
- Non-protein nitrogen, an animal feed component
- NPN transistor
- Normal Polish notation, in mathematics
- Neptunium nitride, a chemical compound

== Organisations ==
- National Party of Nigeria, a former political party
- New Politics Network, a UK think tank
- Naspers (JSE stock ticker symbol)

== Other uses ==
- Natural Health Product Number, required by the Canadian Natural Health Products Directorate
