= JCPA =

JCPA may refer to:

- The Jean Chrétien Pledge to Africa Act, a piece of Canadian patent legislation allowing the manufacture and export of medicines to countries without local manufacturing capacity
- Jerusalem Center for Public Affairs, an Israeli think tank
- Jewish Council for Public Affairs, an American progressive advocacy group

== See also ==
- The Joint Comprehensive Plan of Action (JCPOA)
