= Empire Laboratories =

Canadian pharmaceutical company

- Industry: Pharmaceutical
- Founded: August 21, 1959; 67 years ago in Toronto, Ontario, Canada
- Founder: Louis Lloyd Winter
- Defunct: August 23, 1967
- Fate: Purchased by Barry Sherman
- Successor: Apotex

Empire Laboratories was a Canadian pharmaceutical company incorporated on August 21, 1959 as Empire Laboratories Limited by founder Louis Lloyd Winter in Toronto, Ontario, Canada. It grew to become the largest pharmaceutical business in Canada during the 1960s, until the death of its founder on November 5, 1965.

== Legal Accomplishments ==
It is notable for being the first Canadian generic pharmaceutical company that was legally permitted to package its generic medications exactly like its brand name counterparts, in order to prevent consumers from becoming confused when purchasing its lower-cost medications. The only stipulation in the landmark Supreme Court Case ruling of (Parke, Davis & Co. v. Empire Laboratories Ltd., [1964] S.C.R. 351), was that Empire Laboratories was required to place its recognizable "E" trademark identity directly on all of its products to distinguish its products from those of the name-brand pharmaceutical competitors.

== Accomplishments ==
The Empire pharmaceutical operation became diversified and expanded, and it became one of Canada's largest pharmaceutical companies with over 100 products in its 1964 product catalog. Empire was the first Canadian firm to license and manufacture popular medications like Valium (diazepam), Orinase (tolbutamide) and Tetracyn (tetracycline). The United States market was becoming a greater focus, and the U.S. military became a client, and a special manufacturing facility was being built in Puerto Rico under PRIDCO (Puerto Rico Industrial Development Company) to ship products tariff free to the US Mainland. Lou Winter also invested in Vanguard Medical Supplies, the first Canadian mail-order based pharmaceutical business with Israel Kerzner and Murray Rubin, to service rural regions via catalog mail order, and Professional Printing Services handled all of the catalog production.

== Death of Louis Winter ==
Unfortunately, at just 41 years, Louis Winter died on November 5, 1965, at St. Joseph's Hospital in Toronto, just seventeen days prior to his wife Beverley's death; who had previously been hospitalized at the same facility having been diagnosed with terminal leukemia. The couple left four orphaned children under the age of seven: Paul born on December 16, 1958; Jeffrey born on May 23, 1960; Kerry born June 3, 1961; and Dana born on June 21, 1962.

== Sale of Empire Laboratories ==
The Empire Group of Companies was purchased by Louis Winter's nephew Bernard (Barry) Sherman on August 23, 1967, in conjunction with his high school friend, Joel Ulster. To facilitate the corporate acquisition, Barry and Joel Ulster (Sherman and Ulster Limited) offered five percent equity options to each of the four children and a fifteen year royalty on four of its patented products. Litigation is currently before the courts concerning the purchase of the corporate assets and brands from the Winter children's estate, as Sherman and his partner never paid the royalties nor provided the promised equity in the businesses. The executor, Royal Trust, now a division of Royal Bank of Canada (RBC), processed this transaction on behalf of the infant beneficiaries of Beverley and Louis Winter. Barry Sherman would eventually launch Apotex Inc. in 1974.

== See also ==
- Louis Lloyd Winter
- Apotex
- Bernard (Barry) Sherman
