= Natural Health Products Directorate =

Canadian health organization

The Natural Health Products Directorate (NHPD) is the division of the Health Products and Food Branch of Health Canada that is responsible for implementation of the Natural Health Product Regulations, including Good Manufacturing Practices, for Natural Health Products for sale in Canada.

== Aspects ==
As the regulatory authority for nutritionals, the NHPD controls two aspects of consumer and product safety and efficacy.

1. The issuance of site licences, required for manufacturing facilities in Canada to produce nutritionals for sale in Canada.
2. The issuance of Natural Health Product Numbers (NPNs), required for each nutritional marketed in Canada. Each product is evaluated for formulation, dosage requirements, label claims, safety, and proof of efficacy prior to granting an NPN.
