= Canadian Doctors for Medicare =

Canadian non-profit advocacy organization

- Formation: May 2006
- Type: Non-profit
- Purpose: Advocacy
- Headquarters: Toronto, Ontario
- Executive Director: Katie Arnup
- Website: www.canadiandoctorsformedicare.ca

Canadian Doctors for Medicare is a Canadian non-profit advocacy organization that was founded in Toronto in 2006. The organization argues against the privatization of healthcare.

== Organization ==
Canadian Doctors for Medicare is based in Toronto, Ontario.

The organization's first director was Danielle Martin, as of 2023, the executive director is Katie Arnup.

In 2014, the governing board had 17 members, all of them physicians. Board members include Jasmine Gite, and Amit Arya. Board chairs have included Danielle Martin, followed by Monika Dutt, then Joel Lexchin. The organization has had over 1,000 members since 2006.

== Activities ==
The organization was founded in May 2006. In 2014, the organization advocated against the introduction of a formal system to facilitate medical tourism in Ontario.

The organization advocates against the privatization of healthcare in Canada. It organized the first Canadian Doctors for Medicare Summit in 2022.

== See also ==
- Healthcare in Canada
- Two-tier healthcare
