= Bill C-51 =

Bill C-51 is a designation given to multiple bills under consideration by the Parliament of Canada. Notable bills with this designation include:

- Bill C-51 (2008), a proposed amendment to the Food and Drugs Act
- Bill C-51 (2015), the Anti-terrorism Act, 2015, 2015
