= Therapeutic Products Directorate =

Pharmaceutical Drugs Directorate (PDD), previously called the Therapeutic Products Directorate (TPD), is a Canadian federal authority that regulates small molecule pharmaceutical drugs for human use. Prior to being given market authorization, a manufacturer must present substantive scientific evidence of a product's safety, efficacy, and quality as required by the Food and Drugs Act and Regulations. It is one of the ten operational directorates of the Health Products and Food Branch, a branch of Health Canada.

== See also ==
- European Medicines Agency
- Good Manufacturing Practice
- Good clinical practice
- Informed consent
- Institutional review board
- International Conference on Harmonisation of Technical Requirements for Registration of Pharmaceuticals for Human Use
- Investigational product
- Investigator's Brochure
