= Apotex =

Canadian pharmaceutical company

Apotex Inc.

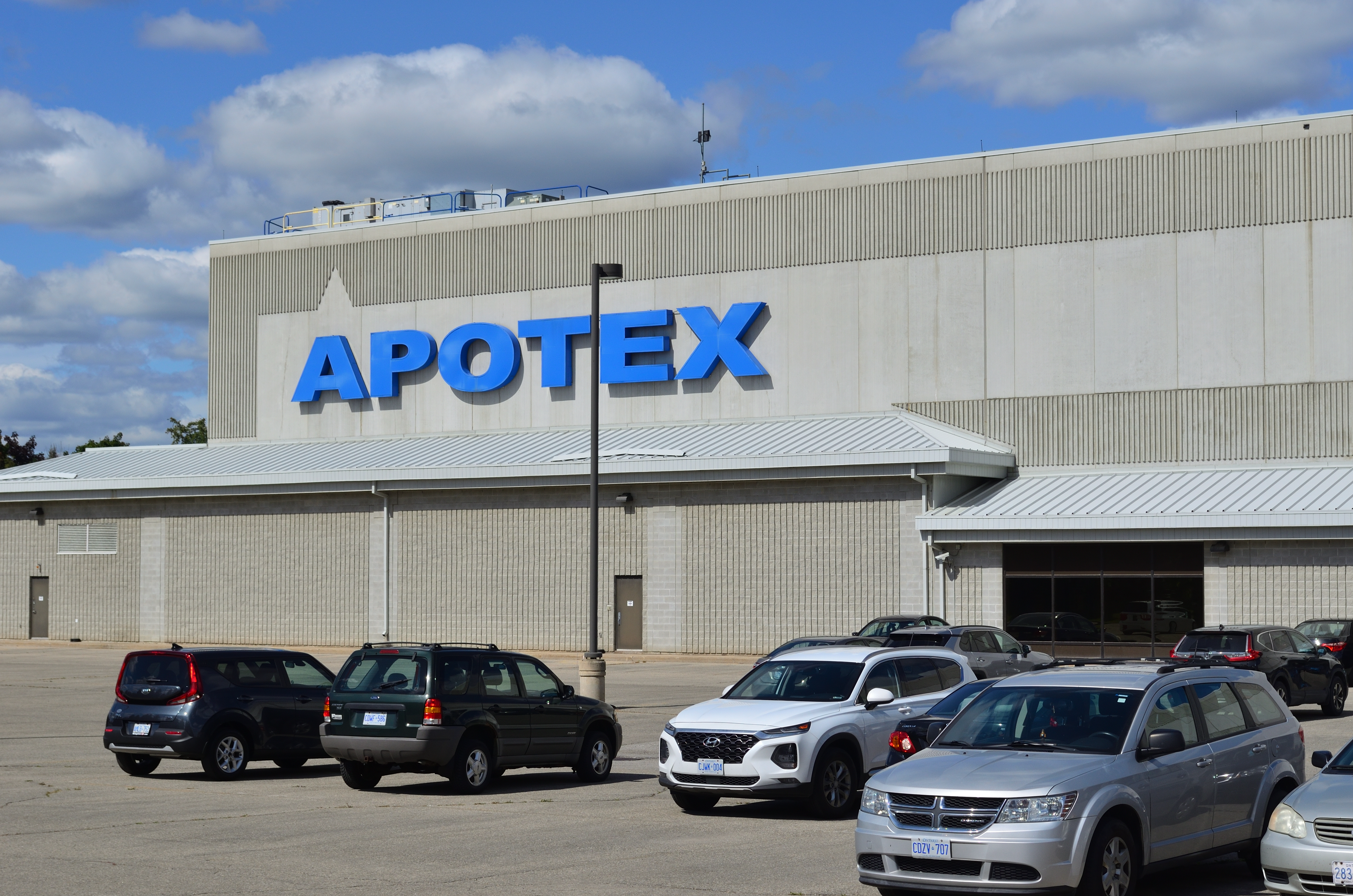
- Apotex in Richmond Hill, ON
- Type: Public
- Traded as: TSX: APTX
- Industry: Pharmaceutical
- Founded: 1974
- Founder: Barry Sherman
- Headquarters: Toronto, Ontario, Canada
- Area served: Worldwide
- Key people: Allan Oberman, President & CEO
- Products: Generic drugs
- Revenue: ▲CA$~3.9 billion in 2023 (in worldwide sales)
- Number of employees: ~8,000 (2023)
- Website: www.apotex.com

Apotex Inc. is a Canadian pharmaceutical corporation. Founded in 1974 by Barry Sherman, the company is the largest producer of generic drugs in Canada, with annual sales exceeding CA$2.5 billion. By 2023, Apotex employed close to 8,000 people as Canada's largest drug manufacturer, with over 300 products selling in over 115 countries. Apotex manufactures and distributes generic medications for a range of diseases and health conditions that include cancer, diabetes, high cholesterol, glaucoma, infections and blood pressure.

Apotex is a member of the Canadian Generic Pharmaceutical Association (CGPA), the Generic Pharmaceutical Association (GPhA), an associate member of the Canadian Animal Health Institute (CAHI), the Canadian Association for Pharmacy Distribution Management (CAPDM), as well as the Greater Toronto Area's Partners in Project Green.

== History ==
Apotex began with limited staff in a 10,000-square-foot warehouse. When Barry Sherman started Apotex, at first he was losing so much money "that his wife urged him to close his business before he lost everything." In 1980, Apotex was the first company to market a generic version of propranolol, the blood-pressure drug, which boosted Apotex's company profile.

By the mid-1990s, Apotex was earning $700 million in annual sales, which allowed it to control approximately 40 percent of the Canadian generic drug market. As an important development step, in 2003 Apotex became the first to market a generic version of Paxil, the antidepressant originally patented by GlaxoSmithKline. Apotex launched their generic version of Paxil "at risk", meaning before patent litigation between Apotex and GlaxoSmithKline over Paxil had concluded.

In 2007, Apotex acquired a Belgian generic drug maker, Topgen ESV, from Zambon Group SpA of Italy as a way for Apotex to expand its European footprint. That same year, Apotex acquired Lareq Pharma SL of Spain from Industria Quimica Y Farmaceutica to extend the company's presence in Western Europe. In 2010, Apotex launched a generic version of Pfizer Inc.'s cholesterol-lowering Lipitor drug in Canada, after four years of patent litigation with Pfizer. Apotex's generic version was launched under the name of Apo-Atorvastatin. This saved provincial health programs over $800 million per year.

In 2010, Apotex was listed in the eighth position in a report published by FiercePharma listing the top U.S. generic companies, based on sales from January 2009 to December 2009.

In 2012, Apotex launched a generic version of Crestor, the cardiovascular drug originally patented and manufactured by AstraZeneca. Apotex's generic version of Crestor is called Apo-Rosuvastatin.

On Friday, December 15, 2017, Apotex founder Barry Sherman and his wife Honey were discovered murdered at their home in North York. Toronto Police were still investigating as of June 2021 when the estate files were unsealed by order of the Supreme Court of Canada (SCC). "In June 2018, a lower court judge issued an order protecting the files, which concern the appointment of estate trustees and would ordinarily be available for public inspection."

=== Launch of first generic Plavix pill ===
In 2006, Sanofi-Aventis SA and Bristol-Myers Squibb Co., the producers and patent owners of Plavix, the blood thinner drug, settled a patent lawsuit with Apotex. In the settlement, Apotex agreed not to sell a generic version of Plavix until September 2011, in exchange for an unspecified amount of money. The settlement contained a clause that allowed Apotex to bring to market a generic version of Plavix in the situation where the agreement between Apotex and Bristol-Myers was not upheld by the U.S. Federal Trade Commission. In this situation, Apotex would be able to bring to market a generic version of Plavix, even before the expiration of Sanofi-Aventis SA and Bristol-Myers Squibb's patent on the drug.

In July 2006, the Attorney General rejected the agreement between Apotex and Sanofi-Aventis SA and Bristol-Myers Squibb Co. On August 8, 2006, Apotex launched their generic version of Plavix and during the five days that the company was able to produce the drug, Apotex "flooded the market with many months' supply of the generic drug."

=== Launch of biosimilar filgrastim ===
In 2013, Apotex began selling a biosimilar version of Amgen's Neulasta in Europe, a blockbuster drug used by cancer patients in chemotherapy as a way to boost white blood count. Apotex's version is known as Grastofil (filgrastim) and is licensed for sale in Europe by Stada Arzneimittel. In February 2015, the FDA accepted Apotex's application of its filing of Grastofil in the United States.

=== Murder of CEO ===
On 13 December 2017 Barry Sherman, at the time Chairman and CEO of Apotex, and his wife were found murdered in their Toronto home. As of January 2023 police had made no arrests. Jeff Watson, who had worked with the company for over 25 years, was appointed President and CEO in 2018.

=== Takeover ===
On 28 September 2022 it was announced that Apotex would be taken over by SK Capital Partners LP. Current CEO Jeff Watson was unable to release details of the sale at the time. The closing of Apotex Pharmaceutical Holdings Inc.'s acquisition by an affiliate of investors advised by SK Capital Partners was announced on April 3, 2023. The company also declared that Allan Oberman, a seasoned pharmaceutical executive, has been appointed president, chief executive officer, and board member of Apotex.

=== Initial public offering ===
In June 2026, Apotex Health Corp. completed an initial public offering on the Toronto Stock Exchange (TSX). Its common shares began trading under the symbol TSX: APTX on June 10, 2026. The upsized offering closed on June 16, 2026, after the full exercise of the over-allotment option, with 62,291,670 common shares sold at C$24.00 per share for gross proceeds of C$1.495 billion.

== Structure ==
The company has three main divisions: Research & Development (which includes Biosimilars), Manufacturing, and Sales & Marketing. The biotechnology division is divided into three subsidiaries.

Apotex owned 61% of Cangene Corp., a Winnipeg-based biopharmaceutical company, according to Cangene's 2007 annual report. Cangene's business focuses are hyperimmune drugs, contract manufacturing, biopharmaceuticals and biodefense against infectious diseases such as smallpox, hepatitis B and anthrax. Its products include WinRho SDF. In February 2014, Emergent BioSolutions, an American company based in Rockville, Maryland, acquired Cangene Corporation.

In 1991, Apotex opened Apotex Fermentation in Winnipeg to develop fermentation-based technologies for the production of Active Pharmaceutical Ingredients (APIs) and to manufacture APIs for eventual sale as final dosage forms in Canada and internationally. The factory employs 150 people.

In January 2004, ApoPharma was founded. It is the subsidiary responsible for research and development of new chemical entities.

Barry Sherman was the chairman until his death in 2017, and Jack M. Kay was the vice chair until he was fired by Jonathan Sherman.

== Society and culture ==
=== Medical ethics and impacts of attempts to silence researchers ===
A critical review of Miriam Shuchman's 2005 book about Dr. Nancy Olivieri versus Apotex, summarizes how "Nancy Olivieri is famous for raising doubts about an experimental drug with which she was treating thalassemia patients. Her principled stand, and the resulting scandal, led universities to offer researchers some protection against illegitimate drug company pressure. Medical journals changed their publication rules. Research hospitals changed their policies. She became an international icon. Apotex, the drug company which tried to silence her, has attracted international opprobrium. The company threatened to sue Olivieri if she publicly revealed her fears about the inadequacy of their drug, deferiprone. She sued them for libeling her; they sued her ($20 million) for libeling their drug."

=== International access to medicine ===
Over the years, Apotex has provided medicines for international humanitarian support efforts. Since 2012, Apotex has worked in conjunction with The Teasdale-Corti Foundation to provide medicine for St. Mary's Hospital Lacor (also known as Lacor Hospital) in Uganda. Apotex continued to provide medicines for Lacor Hospital in 2013, and in total, has donated approximately $1.2 million in medicines to Lacor Hospital.

In September 2014, in response to the spread of the chikungunya virus in Haiti, Apotex worked with the humanitarian organization Direct Relief to donate more than $2.2 million in medical aid to the country.

In 2009, Apotex began providing medicines to the Mully Children's Family Foundation, an organization located outside of Nairobi, Kenya that is dedicated to rescuing and supporting orphaned and homeless children. Thus far, Apotex has provided three shipments of medications to the Foundation.

=== Work with Canada's Access to Medicines Regime (CAMR) ===
In 2004, the Pledge to Africa Act legislation enacted Canada's Access to Medicines Regime (CAMR), which pledged to improve access to drugs to developing countries that lack the resources to manufacture the medications or purchase them at cost. The CAMR allowed for patents on medications to be overridden through a "compulsory licensing" so that generic drug manufacturers could supply these drugs to developing countries at lower prices.

Beginning in 2005, Apotex worked on developing an HIV treatment involving three drugs, AZT, 3TC and Nevirapine, which could be sent to countries in need under CAMR. In September 2008, after four years of fighting "a morass of red tape and petty politics", Apotex shipped seven million doses of Apo-TriAvir, the generic AIDS medication that resulted from the research, to Rwanda. The shipment provided enough medication to treat 21,000 Rwandans for a full year.

=== Philanthropy in Canada ===
Apotex donated $1.5 million to The University of Saskatchewan's College of Pharmacy, which was the largest donation given to the College of Pharmacy.

On August 22, 2013, Apotex announced that it would donate $10 million toward the construction of the new Humber River Hospital (HRH) in Toronto. Apotex's donation went towards the building of HRH's Emergency Department.

=== Creation of the Apotex Foundation ===
Apotex established the Apotex Foundation, a privately held charitable organization, which has donated over $50 million in medicines over the last 10 years. Critical medicines have been shipped to every disaster zone around the globe to provide assistance to humans in need.

=== Expanding access to generic pharmaceuticals ===
Apotex is known for actively fighting patent protections on brand-name drugs, primarily through litigation means. A New York Times cover piece on Apotex's founder, Bernard Sherman, described Sherman's work to get new generic drugs to market as "something of a crusade." The article goes on to explain that while some generic drug manufacturers cut deals with brand-name manufacturers over drug patents, Sherman and Apotex are against such deal-making.

In a 2008 article on pharmaceutical patent cases, The Globe and Mail cited Apotex as being "prepared to wage expensive courtroom battles with the help of high-priced talent from such firms as Goodmans LLP". In a 2007 National Post article, Apotex revealed that it spent roughly $60-million a year on legal fees, both in defense of the company and working toward expanding the number of generics on the market.

== Regulatory issues ==
Apotex received a warning letter from the FDA regarding its Etobicoke plant on June 25, 2009 for good manufacturing practice (GMP) violations. It also received a warning letter citing similar GMP violations in the Signet plant on March 29, 2010. The FDA issued an import ban on all drugs manufactured at these two plants and prevented the company from seeking new marketing authorizations in the US on August 28, 2009. The import ban was subsequently lifted on May 6, 2011. On February 29, 2012, Apotex filed a claim to the International Centre for Settlement of Investment Disputes seeking arbitration with the US. In the filing, Apotex cited unfair treatment by FDA which constituted a violation of the North American Free Trade Agreement (NAFTA). Apotex further claimed that the action of FDA 'decimated its business'. On August 26, 2014, NAFTA tribunal rejected Apotex's claim.

FDA inspected the same plants again in 2013 and issued warning letters for more problems. In April 2014, FDA banned a manufacturing plant owned by Apotex in Bangalore, India. In the warning letter, FDA indicated that the plant routinely deleted failed test results and replaced with retest results that passed. FDA found that the violations are systemic and were dated back for many years, having the same issues noted in past inspections since 2006.

As of September, 2018 Apotex remains in violation of Current GMPs required by the FDA.

=== Price-fixing ===
In 2020, the US DOJ fined Apotex $24,100,000 for colluding with other pharmaceutical companies to price fix—raising costs of vital drugs for users who needed its cholesterol medicine. In the words of Special Agent in Charge Scott Pierce: "When generic drug companies conspire to fix prices and rig bids, they do so to the detriment of many who depend on these medications to maintain good health". In the words of U.S. Attorney William M. McSwain, "Compromising the health and welfare of innocent people by artificially inflating the price of a much needed medication is not only morally wrong, but illegal. Preying on the public in this manner for the sake of financial gain is something that must be rooted out of the pharmaceutical industry”.

On October 31, 2024, Apotex and Heritage Pharmaceuticals agreed to pay $49.1 million to resolve allegations of price-fixing in collusion to artificially raise drug prices as charged by a coalition of 50 U.S. state attorneys general.

=== Litigation ===
In 1998, The Toronto Star reported that "[Apotex's] feud with Dr. Nancy Olivieri, at Toronto's Hospital for Sick Children, over the merits of deferiprone, is perhaps the firm's most visible fight. But that's only one in a long string of snarling confrontations involving Apotex – battles which the company has usually won. Apotex has been involved in lawsuits against some of the world's biggest multinational companies. From heart drugs to AIDS medications, Apotex fought for, and won, the right to market drugs invented by others."

On 17 May 2013, a group of pregnant Canadian women filed a class-action lawsuit against Apotex, after it was discovered that the company's recalled birth control pill packages contained more placebos than usual.

In October 2014, the Federal Court of Canada (FCC) released decisions on Section 8 of the Patented Medicines (Notice of Compliance) Regulations as it relates to litigation between Sanofi-Aventis and Apotex (Sanofi-Aventis et al. v. Apotex Inc.). Section 8 explains how a brand-name drug manufacturer may be liable to a generic drug manufacturer for damages caused by a generic drug's delay in reaching market, caused as a result of unsuccessful prohibition proceedings on the part of the brand-name manufacturer. Sanofi argued that the current framework for quantifying damages in a hypothetical market inherently leads to a windfall for the generic manufacturer. In October 2014, the Federal Court of Appeal (FCA) affirmed that section 8 of the Regulations was constitutionally and jurisdictionally valid, a decision which Sanofi appealed.

In April 2015, the Supreme Court of Canada (SCC) affirmed the FCA's section 8 quantification decision with respect to the litigation between Sanofi and Apotex. This was the first time that the SCC had the opportunity to consider section 8 of the Patented Medicines Regulations.

In October 2014, Apotex filed a lawsuit against the Canadian government to overturn a ban on importing drugs manufactured in its overseas (India) factories. The government had implemented the ban (that affected 60 drugs and drug ingredients) after public attention was brought to the fact that Health Canada was allowing the drugs' importation despite the fact that "Inspectors from the FDA had found that staff at Apotex plants in Bangalore manipulated data, destroyed records and retested samples until they got favourable results" and the US banned imports.

In 2021, Bayer and Viatris' Meda Pharmaceuticals filed a lawsuit against Apotex to delay FDA approval of the company's generic version of Astepro Allergy nasal spray, alleging patent infringement.
