= Drug identification number =

Canadian pharmaceutical code

Any product defined as a drug under the Canadian Food and Drugs Act must have an associated drug identification number (or DIN). A DIN also pertains to veterinary drugs permitted for sale in Canada.

The drug identification number (DIN) is the 8 digit number located on the label of prescription and over-the-counter drug products that have been evaluated by the Therapeutic Products Directorate (TPD) and approved for sale in Canada.

Once a drug has been approved, the Therapeutic Products Directorate issues a DIN, which permits the manufacturer to market the drug in Canada. For drugs, where there is minimal market history in Canada, there is a more stringent review and the drug is required to have a Notice of Compliance and a DIN in order to be marketed in Canada.

A DIN lets the user know that the product has undergone and passed a review of its formulation, labeling, and instructions for use. A drug product sold in Canada without a DIN is not in compliance with Canadian law, with limited exceptions, such as foreign drug products imported under emergency authorization.

The DIN is also a tool to help in the follow-up of products on the market, recall of products, inspections, and quality monitoring. A drug product can be looked up via its DIN with the Health Canada's Drug Product Database (DPD) to find specific information of drugs approved by the Ministry.

== See also ==
- National Drug Code United States
- Pharmaceutical code
