= Michele Brill-Edwards =

Canadian pediatrician, whistleblower

Michele Brill-Edwards is a Canadian whistleblower. She is a lecturer and emergency physician in the Department of Pediatrics at the University of Ottawa. Brill-Edwards is best known for heading Health Canada drug approvals between 1987 and 1992 and quitting in 1996 after blowing the whistle on the agency's suppression of prescription drug risks. She won a 1992 federal court case against her employer. She completed medical school at the University of Toronto in 1974 and her pediatrics residency, with a fellowship in clinical pharmacology, in 1986 at The Hospital for Sick Children in Toronto. She was a member of the Division of Emergency Medicine at the Children's Hospital of Eastern Ontario (CHEO) from 1980 to 1992 and returned to the division in 2002.

Brill-Edwards was honoured with a whistle-blowers national award in 2005. This was reported as: "Michele Brill-Edwards, who took a Health Canada director to court in the 1990s for overruling scientific decisions on drug safety. She was demoted and resigned, and continues to speak out on drug issues." As a representative for the Alliance for Public Accountability, Brill-Edwards intervened in the media in Canada's tainted-blood scandal involving the Red Cross.

Brill-Edwards was "the central character" in an episode of CBC's The Fifth Estate (TV), in which she was depicted "as a tireless moral crusader; a champion of the people who was justifiably suspicious of the big drug companies, HPB, and doctors like Myers and Leenen who, the program alleged, seemed to be conspiring to keep the drug on the market despite the fact that a number of red flags had been raised in the United States, Canada and Britain."
