= Natural health product =

The term natural health product (NHP) is used in Canada to describe substances such as vitamins and minerals, herbal medicines, homeopathic preparations, energy drinks, probiotics, and many alternative and traditional medicines. A 2010 survey showed that 73% of Canadians consume NHP on a regular basis. NHP are obtainable without a prescription and are required to be safe to be used as an over-the-counter product.

== Regulation ==
Natural health care products are currently regulated under the Natural Health Product Regulations, under the authority of the Food and Drugs Act. The regulations address the sale of natural health products, manufacture, packaging, labelling and importation for sale of natural health products, the distribution of natural health products, and the storage of natural health products. Under the regulations, all natural health products require a Natural Product Number (NPN), analogous to the Drug Identification Numbers (DINs) used to identify and monitor drugs in Canada.

Natural Health Products are defined in Canada as:

- Vitamins and minerals
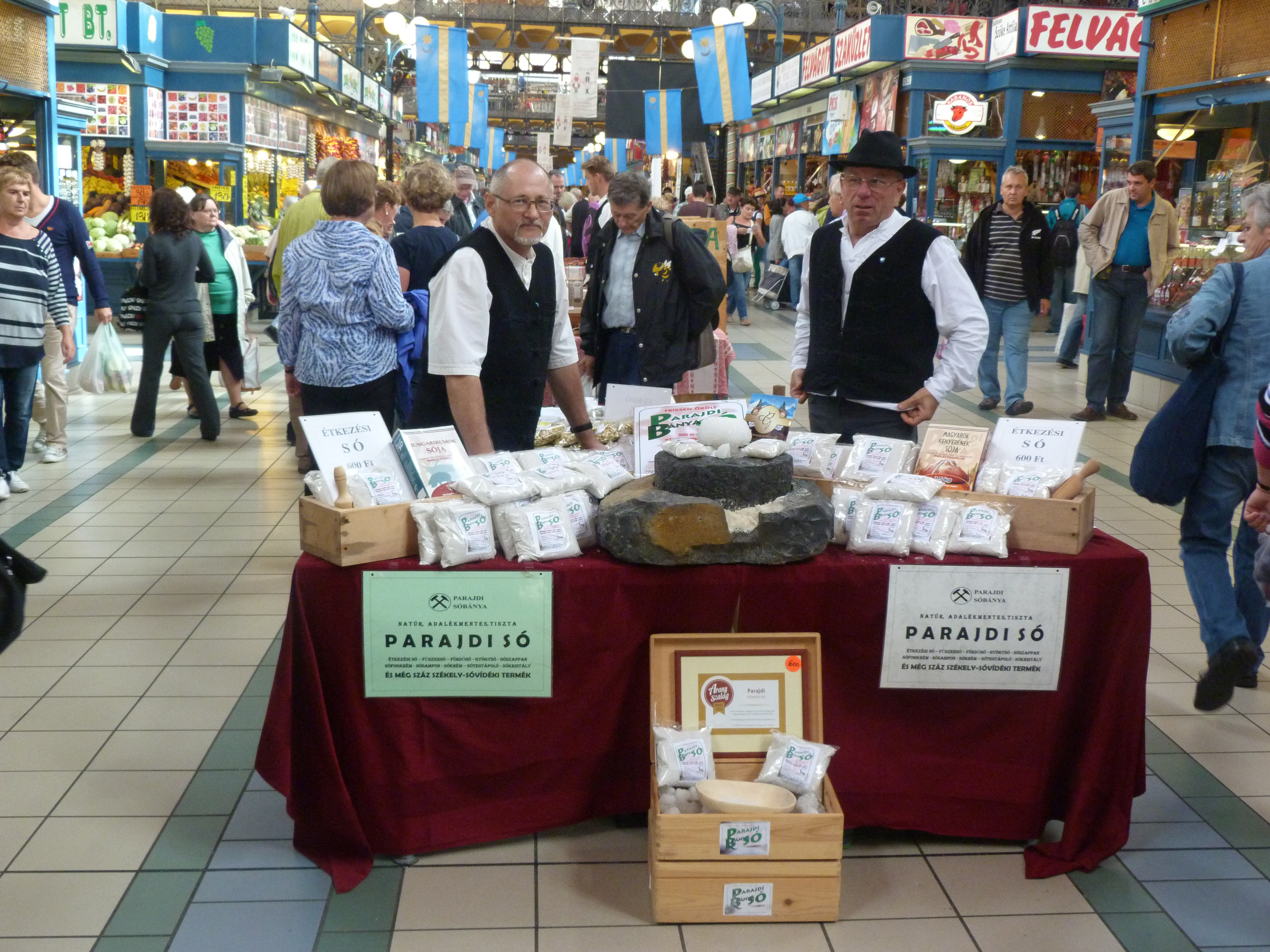
  Salt of Székely Land, 2014
- Herbal remedies
- Homeopathic medicines
- Traditional medicines such as traditional Chinese medicines
- Probiotics, and
- Other products like amino acids and essential fatty acids.

== Risks ==
NHPs are safe to consume and generally have less side effects than traditional drug medications. However, NHP are not risk free and have potential for some risks. These may come about from manufacturing problems (contamination, incorrect dose), misrepresented or unproven claims on the label, unexpected side effects (allergic reaction), or interaction with other medication/NHPs also being consumed. It has been reported that 12% of Canadians have experienced unwanted side effects due to the consumption of NHPs. It is recommended that you do your research and consult a health care professional if you are concerned with the potential risks.
