= Monika Dutt =

Canadian medical doctor

- Born: Burlington, Ontario
- Education: University of Toronto; Queen's University (MD); Johns Hopkins University (MPH, MBA)
- Organization(s): Upstream; Canadian Doctors for Medicare

Monika Dutt is a Canadian physician based in Nova Scotia, and a past chair of Canadian Doctors for Medicare. She is known for taking advocacy stances on social justice matters. She is a specialist in Public Health and Preventive Medicine and also in Family Medicine.

== Early life and education ==
Dutt is from Burlington, Ontario and her mother was also a medical doctor.

She studied the University of Toronto's Community Medicine Research Program and has a Doctorate in Medicine from Queen's University.

She has a Masters of Business Administration and Masters of Public Health from Johns Hopkins University and a MFA in Creative Writing from University of British Columbia. She is a PhD Candidate in Health Policy at McMaster University.

== Politics ==
Dutt ran for the New Democratic Party in the 2015 Canadian federal election in the Sydney-Victoria riding, and campaigned for Hillary Clinton in the 2016 United States presidential election.

== Career and advocacy ==
Dutt has practiced medicine in Ontario, Northwest Territories, Nova Scotia and Newfoundland and Labrador. She is currently the Medical Officer of Health for Central and Western Newfoundland and Labrador and a family physician at the Ally Centre of Cape Breton. She is currently on the Board of the Broadbent Institute and the Cabot Trail Writers Festival. She has served on the board of directors of Doctors Nova Scotia, chaired Canadian Doctors for Medicare, and has been the medical officer for three provinces and territories in Canada: Nova Scotia, Newfoundland and Labrador, and Northwest Territories

She was the Executive Director of Upstream not for profit from 2017 to 2018.

She was one of many doctors who signed an open letter to Canadian federal Minister of Finance Bill Morneau calling for tax reform.

== Personal life ==
Dutt lives with her son in Sydney River, Nova Scotia.

She is a cyclist. In 2022, she won the H.R. (Bill) Percy Short Creative Non-Fiction Prize for her short story about single motherhood, Foundations.
