= Canada's Access to Medicines Regime =

Canada's Access to Medicines Regime (French: Régime canadien d'accès aux médicaments, CAMR) is a process established by the Canadian government that allows Canada to enact compulsory licenses to export essential medicines to countries without the capacity to manufacture their own.

The Regime was established in 2004 by An Act to amend the Patent Act and the Food and Drugs Act, also known as the "Jean Chrétien Pledge to Africa Act", along with other regulations, in a bill introduced as C-9 in the third session of the 37th Canadian Parliament. It represented the first implementation of the TRIPS flexibilities declared in the August 30, 2003 General Council decision of the World Trade Organization.

== History ==
CAMR gained force of law in 2004. At the time of a statutory governmental review in 2007, the Regime had not yet been used. The review concluded that, due to insufficient evidence, "the case for making legislative or regulatory changes to CAMR has not yet been made out".

CAMR has since been used once: in 2008-2009, Apotex, Inc. used the Regime to manufacture and export two shipments of a patented antiretroviral medication to Rwanda. Apotex has since stated that it does not intend to use the Regime again unless it is reformed, claiming that the Regime imposes unnecessary bureaucratic and economic obstacles.

A private members' bill that would reform the CAMR was tabled in the House of Commons (Bill C-393). The bill passed in the Commons on March 9, 2011 (172-111, including support from the Bloc Québécois and the New Democratic Party, all but two Liberals and 26 Conservatives). The bill then stalled in the Senate and died on the order paper when the government fell.

Part of the challenge in providing medicine to Africa was highlighted by former U.S. President Bill Clinton at a meeting of the Economic and Social Council of the United Nations on February 23, 2009. Speaking on Global Health Progress, Clinton stated,

... my experience has been that almost no one in the world will die this year because of the cost or the lack of availability of AIDS medicine. But many people will die of AIDS this year because of the absence of effective health care systems in rural areas of the poorest countries.
