= Veterinary Drugs Directorate =

The Veterinary Drugs Directorate is the Canadian body responsible for putting all "veterinary products, such as antimicrobials, growth promotion drugs and feed additives, through a rigorous approval process before they are licensed and sold for use" in Canada. It is part of the Health Products and Food Branch of Health Canada, and exists by virtue of the Food and Drugs Act. Its goal is "to protect human and animal health and the safety of Canada's food supply."

== History ==
=== AMR ===
The WHO has defined Antimicrobial resistance (AMR) as "the ability of a microorganism (like bacteria, viruses, and some parasites) to stop an antimicrobial (such as antibiotics, antivirals and antimalarials) from working against it. As a result, standard treatments become ineffective, infections persist and may spread to other [people]."

In 2011, Manisha Mehrotra, at the time director of the human safety division within the Directorate, spoke passionately about the need to crack down on the use of antibiotics such as cephalosporins and fluoroquinolones in the Canadian meat industry because of the risk of creating antibiotic resistant strains of viruses.

On 1 December 2018, "all medically important antimicrobials currently available over the counter for veterinary use, including those used in companion and food animals and in all dosage forms", were moved to prescription status. Antimicrobials are no longer to be used for growth promotion in Canada from this date.

== Leadership ==
The Director-General from 2005 to 2007 was Siddika Mithani, who was once the President of the Public Health Agency of Canada, and is now the President of the Canadian Food Inspection Agency.

The Directorate has been led since at least June 2017 by Dr. Mary-Jane Ireland.
