= York University Faculty of Health =

- Type: Faculty
- Established: September 2006
- Parent institution: York University
- Dean: David Peters
- Location: Toronto, Ontario, Canada
- Website: yorku.ca/health

The York University Faculty of Health was founded in 2006. Led by Dean David Peters, the Faculty is based in Toronto, Ontario, Canada and is part of York University's campus of over 53,000 students.

The Faculty of Health, with over 10,000 undergraduate students, over 600 graduate students and over 200 full-time faculty members, offers six undergraduate programs: Global Health, Health Studies (Health Policy, Management, and Digital Health), Kinesiology and Health Science, Neuroscience, Nursing, and Psychology.

The Faculty is affiliated with Stong and Calumet Colleges. The current dean, Dr. David Peters, was appointed in May 2022. His first term started January 1, 2023 when he replaced the outgoing dean, Dr. Paul McDonald.

Internationally, the Faculty has partnered with institutions in Europe, Africa, and South America offering students the chance to study abroad as part of select degrees. Co-op opportunities are also available in Health programs (except nursing), allowing students to gain paid work experience while completing their degree.

== Academic Units & Programs ==
The Faculty of Health offers a range of undergraduate, graduate and certificate programs and engages in integrative basic science, applied research and knowledge mobilization. The academic units and two colleges (Stong and Calumet) form the core of the Faculty of Health's integrated model linking undergraduate, graduate and student success programs.

- Department of Psychology: the undergraduate program offers BA and BSc degrees and the graduate program offers MA and PhD degrees. There is also a program in rehabilitation services offered jointly with Seneca College.
- School of Kinesiology and Health Science offers an undergraduate program (BA and BSc) as well as two certificate programs in Athletic Therapy and Fitness Assessment and Exercise Counselling. The Athletic Therapy certificate is being phased out, with the final cohort admitted in September 2026. A Master of Athletic Therapy will launch in May 2027. The MSc/PhD graduate program includes three specialization areas: Integrative Physiology, Neuroscience and Biomechanics and Health and Fitness Behaviours.
- School of Nursing prepares nurses for practice (both entry to practice and advanced practice). The School offers three BScN undergraduate degree programs: Direct Entry, 2nd Entry, and a Post-RN program for Internationally Educated Nurses. The School also offers a Master of Science in Nursing (MScN), PhD in Nursing, and a Nurse Practitioners (MScN‑NP) program.
- School of Health Policy & Management offers a Bachelor of Health Studies (BHS) in Health Studies and a Specialized Honours BHS in Health Policy, Management, and Digital Health. At the graduate level, the school offers MA and PhD degrees in Health and Critical Disability Studies.
- The School of Global Health was the first in Canada to offer an undergraduate degree in global health. The BA and BSc degree programs explore global health challenges such as chronic and communicable diseases, wealth disparity, environmental degradation, government policy and human rights.
- The Neuroscience program is jointly offered by the Faculty of Health and Faculty of Science and investigates the development, structure, and function of the brain and nervous system.

== Notable faculty ==
- Harvey Skinner, Inaugural Dean, Faculty of Health
- Paul McDonald, Professor Emeritus and former Dean, Faculty of Health
- Ellen Bialystok, Distinguished Research Professor, Psychology
- Debra Pepler, Distinguished Research Professor, Psychology
- Dennis Raphael, Professor, Health Policy & Management
- Rebecca Pillai Riddell, Professor, Psychology
- Lauren Sergio, Professor, Kinesiology & Health Science
- David A. Hood, Professor, Kinesiology & Health Science
- Joel Lexchin, Professor Emeritus, Health Policy & Management
