= Amir Attaran =

American lawyer and professor

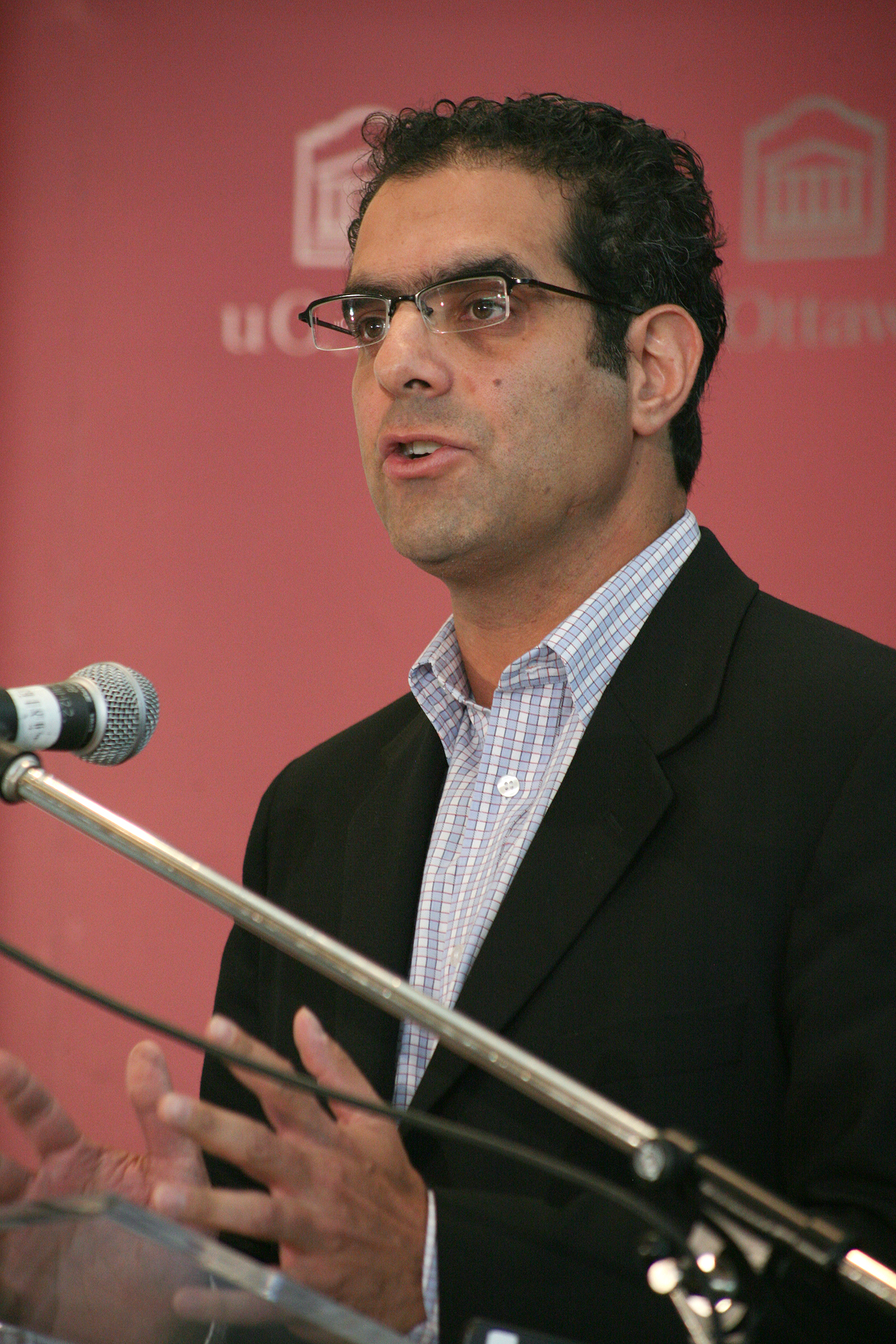

Academic background
- Education: UC Berkeley (BA), Caltech (MS), University of Oxford (PhD), University of British Columbia (LLB)
- Thesis: CTL Cytotoxicity and the Cytoskeleton: A Microscopial Study (1995)

Academic work
- Discipline: Biologist, lawyer
- Sub-discipline: Public health, environmental law
- Institutions: University of Ottawa
- Website: commonlaw.uottawa.ca/en/people/attaran-amir

Amir Attaran (Persian: امیر عطاران) is an American professor in both the Faculty of Law and the School of Epidemiology, Public Health and Community Medicine at the University of Ottawa.

== Early life and education ==
Attaran was born in California to immigrants from Iran.

Attaran's doctoral thesis examined how killer T-cells modify themselves structurally in response to viral infections as a precursor to granulocyte- and apoptosis-mediated cytotoxicity, and is entitled CTL Cytotoxicity and the Cytoskeleton: A Microscopial Study.

From 2000 to 2003, Attaran held a junior academic position at Harvard University in the Kennedy School of Government, where his research focus was on public health law and policy. At Harvard he co-directed the WHO Commission on Macroeconomics and Health. From 2003 to 2005, Attaran taught at Yale University in the School of Public Health, and was a fellow at Chatham House (formerly the Royal Institute of International Affairs) in London, where he researched global development, patent law, and access to essential medicines for neglected diseases such as malaria.

== Notable work ==
Attaran has had a diverse career as a scientist, lawyer, scholar, and advocate for public health, human rights and environmental protection.

In 1999 and 2000, Attaran was an environmental lawyer participating in the negotiation of the Stockholm Convention on Persistent Organic Pollutants, which banned the manufacturing and use of certain toxic substances. Attaran led a controversial global campaign of over 400 scientists and medical doctors, including several Nobel laureates, who wanted an exemption to use DDT in public health because it is extremely effective in reducing the deaths of children from malaria. South Africa's Medical Research Council subsequently invited Attaran to draft the public health exemption, which countries agreed at the sixth and last negotiation session in Johannesburg as Annex B of the Stockholm Convention. Although once opposed, Greenpeace and the World Wildlife Fund now accept using DDT in small amounts for public health, and the World Health Organization adopted it as a recommended malaria control strategy.

In 2001, Attaran acted as an advisor on patent and trade law to Brazil's Ministry of Health, to defend against a legal challenge the United States brought at the World Trade Organization, which sought to force Brazil to amend its patent laws and prohibit the affordable, generic versions of HIV/AIDS medicines on which the health ministry depended. Attaran and his colleague Paul Champ developed a legal strategy involving a retaliatory challenge to US patent laws. The United States withdrew its case under public pressure and Brazil continued using generic HIV/AIDS medicines for its population.

In 2001, Attaran and Jeffrey Sachs, then at Harvard working on the WHO Commission on Macroeconomics and Health, published an influential paper in The Lancet that the editors of that journal suggested may be the "blueprint" for fighting the global HIV/AIDS pandemic on a large scale. Attaran and Sachs proposed a new, multibillion-dollar fund that would be "based on grants, not loans, for the poorest countries", and which would be "judged as having epidemiological merit ... by a panel of independent scientific experts."

Attaran and human rights lawyer Paul Champ acted as legal counsel for Amnesty International and the BC Civil Liberties Association in a judicial review of the Canadian Forces' detainee policy. Although the Federal Courts found that torture could not be justified under s. 7 of the Charter of Rights and Freedoms, it ruled that the Charter lacks extraterritorial reach to the Canadian Forces' overseas military expeditions. Nonetheless, the Court's decision confirmed that Canada knew about detainees being tortured, as with a man who had "bruising ... consistent with the beating [he] described", and whose story was corroborated by "Canadian personnel [locating] a large piece of braided electrical wire and a rubber hose" in the interrogation room.

From 2009 to 2015, Attaran litigated a case at the Human Rights Tribunal of Ontario which sought to expand the reproductive rights of women and men by compelling the Ontario Health Insurance Plan to fund in vitro fertilization irrespective of sex or disability. Ontario's practice had been to provide IVF only when a woman was infertile, and only where her disability affected the fallopian tubes, thereby excluding other forms of female infertility disability (e.g. cancer, endometriosis), and entirely excluding infertile men. The litigation convinced Ontario to strike an advisory panel on infertility that included Attaran in exchange for him adjourning the hearing, the result of which was that the province finally accepted to fund IVF, mooting the legal challenge.

In 2008, Attaran wrote a Globe and Mail opinion piece critical of the Department of National Defence (DND) for supporting Canada's involvement in the war in Afghanistan through the undisclosed financing of think tanks and academics favourable to Canada's involvement, alleging that the latter could be viewed as tainted. Attaran faced fierce reactions from the DND "who sent in a letter of protest to the Globe as did several defence academics;" and that, in an exchange with one of those "defence academics", military historian J.L. Granatstein, Attaran pointed out that Granatstein himself had received an award of $5000 from an Ottawa-based think tank.

In 2012, Attaran filed a complaint against right-wing political commentator Ezra Levant, who was also a lawyer called to the Alberta bar. Levant told a Hispanic banana company executive "chinga tu madre" ("go fuck your mother") on his Sun TV show. The Law Society of Alberta initially withdrew the charges, but Alberta Court of Queen's Bench Justice Dawn Pentelechuk said the society's explanation for doing so was "unsatisfactory and unclear" and ordered a hearing to determine if they had committed an abuse of process. Levant ultimately resigned from the bar in March, 2016 rather than face a disciplinary hearing. Attaran criticized the law society for allowing Levant to resign without reprimand, saying that it breached their own rules. In 2013, Attaran accused Peter MacKay of falsely alleging that Justin Trudeau committed a crime by smoking marijuana. In dismissing the complaint, the Nova Scotia Barristers' Society said there was no evidence to suggest MacKay knew he was saying something false. MacKay was Attorney General of Canada at the time.

In 2016, Attaran filed a complaint at the Canadian Human Rights Commission alleging that the federal government's Canada Research Chair program discriminated against women, visible minorities, aboriginal people, and persons with disabilities. Attaran brought legal challenge after the CRC Program's decade-long failure to honour a settlement agreement signed by the government of Prime Minister Stephen Harper, setting firm employment equity targets for these four groups. He alleged that he was denied a Canada Research Chair promotion based on racial bias. He then filed a discrimination lawsuit against the University of Ottawa through Human Rights Tribunal of Ontario. Attaran's claims were not proven in court, a confidential settlement having been reached with the university. The government under Prime Minister Justin Trudeau sided with Attaran, and in 2017 Science Minister Kirsty Duncan announced that universities would be required either to increase diversity and meet the employment equity targets, or lose their federal CRC funding.

Attaran faced backlash for comments about Quebec and French-speaking professors in 2020, including his allegations that the French-speaking community is racist.

During the COVID-19 pandemic, Attaran wrote a series of opinion pieces for Maclean's that were critical of the Canadian government's response. In May 2022, he filed a private criminal prosecution against Ontario premier Doug Ford for allegedly breaking federal quarantine law during a March press conference.
