= Joel Lexchin =

Professor of health policy and management

Joel Lexchin is a professor emeritus at the York University Faculty of Health where he taught about pharmaceutical policy, an Associate Professor in the Department of Family and Community Medicine at the University of Toronto, an emergency physician at the Toronto General Hospital and a Fellow in the Canadian Academy of Health Sciences. Lexchin is the author of over 160 peer-reviewed publications.

== Biography ==
Lexchin received his MD from the University of Toronto in 1977.

From 1992 for two years Lexchin was a member of the Ontario Drug Quality and Therapeutics Committee. He was the chair of the Drugs and Pharmacotherapy Committee of the Ontario Medical Association from 1997 for two years.

In 2013, he was quoted in a learned article on Drug patents: the evergreening problem, and he wrote the article on the pharmaceutical industry for the Canadian Encyclopedia.

Lexchin is frequently critical of Canada's drug regulator, the Health Products and Food Branch, as has been noticed in the learned press.

In 2006, Lexchin was quoted by Manzer: "Drug approvals are not all science. There's always decisions to be made around how much risk are we willing to take in terms of drugs, and I think as the industry takes on a larger role in funding the regulatory bodies that those kinds of decisions tend to be made more in favour of the drug companies," and in 2010 was noticed in a Toronto Star article entitled "Health Canada keeps some drug studies secret".
