= Marketed Health Products Directorate =

Canadian federal authority for health products

The Marketed Health Products Directorate (MHPD) is the Canadian federal authority that monitors the safety and effectiveness of health products marketed in Canada. These include:

- Prescription and non-prescription medications
- Biologic medical products, including fractionated blood products
- Therapeutic and diagnostic vaccines
- Natural health products;
- Radiopharmaceutical products
- Medical devices
- Cells, tissues and organs

As part of Health Canada, MHPD collects and analyzes reports of adverse health product reactions through its network of regional reporting centres and disseminates new health product safety information.
