= Pledge to Africa Act =

2004 Canadian act

Parliament of Canada
- Long title: An Act to amend the Patent Act and the Food and Drugs Act (The Jean Chrétien Pledge to Africa)
- Citation: S.C. 2004, c. 23
- Considered by: House of Commons of Canada
- Considered by: Senate of Canada
- Assented to: May 14, 2004

Legislative history

First chamber: House of Commons of Canada
- Bill citation: Bill C-9
- Introduced by: Lucienne Robillard MP, Minister of Industry
- First reading: February 12, 2004
- Second reading: February 12, 2004
- Third reading: May 4, 2004

Second chamber: Senate of Canada
- Member(s) in charge: Eymard Corbin
- First reading: May 4, 2004
- Second reading: May 11, 2004
- Third reading: May 13, 2004
- Status: Current legislation

The Pledge to Africa Act is an Act of the Parliament of Canada. It was Bill C-9 of the third session of the 37th Canadian Parliament. The legislation amends the Patent Act and the Food and Drugs Act to implement Canada's Access to Medicines Regime. It represented the first implementation of the TRIPS flexibilities declared in the August 30, 2003, General Council decision. Enacted in May 2004, it allows Canada to enact compulsory licenses to export essential medicines to countries without the capacity to manufacture their own. Other countries that have since enacted similar legislation include Norway and India.

== Purpose ==
The purpose of the Act is to improve access to drugs for developing countries that lack the resources to manufacture the drugs and cannot afford to buy them at the usual market cost. The drugs that fight these diseases are expensive to create and manufacture and thus are usually unaffordable for those who need them the most.

The Pledge to Africa Act allows for the patents on these drugs to be overridden so that manufacturers can produce generic versions of the drug to sell in underdeveloped countries.

== Criticisms ==
Some questions have been raised concerning the Act's efficacy, or lack thereof, at increasing the availability of pharmaceuticals in poor nations. It took a full year from the time the bill was introduced to the time that it came into effect. Since the Act came into effect in 2005, only one drug has been manufactured and exported under the act. It has been suggested that this is because restrictions incorporated into the Act make it too difficult for generic drug companies to get permission to produce a generic and to export it to countries in need. The process for obtaining patent exemptions under the Act is quite costly, and the exemption must be renewed every two years. As such, it may not be economically viable for generic drug makers to apply for an exemption, or even if it is, the expense and mandated frequent renewals may tend to discourage generic makers from applying. Additionally, exporting pharmaceuticals under the Act to countries that are not part of the World Trade Organization's TRIPS agreement is made more difficult by further restrictions.

== See also ==
- Canada's Access to Medicines Regime
- Patent Act
