= Health Canada =

Government department

- Santé Canada

Department overview
- Type: Department responsible for federal health policy in Canada
- Jurisdiction: Canada
- Headquarters: Ottawa, Ontario
- Employees: 9,848 (2023–24)
- Annual budget: C$6.842 billion (2023–24)
- Minister responsible: Marjorie Michel, Minister of Health
- Deputy Minister responsible: Shalene Curtis-Micallef, Deputy Minister
- Website: health.canada.ca/index-hc-sc.php

Health Canada (HC; French: Santé Canada, SC) (Note: The full legal name is the Department of Health (French: Ministère de la Santé). Health Canada is the applied title under the Federal Identity Program.) is the department of the Government of Canada responsible for national health policy. The department itself is also responsible for numerous federal health-related agencies, including the Canadian Food Inspection Agency (CFIA) and the Public Health Agency of Canada (PHAC), among others. Since 2012, the CFIA has operated as a separate agency but continues to report to the Minister of Health for food safety matters. These organizations help to ensure compliance with federal law in a variety of healthcare, agricultural, and pharmaceutical activities. This responsibility also involves extensive collaboration with various other federal- and provincial-level organizations in order to ensure the safety of food, health, and pharmaceutical products—including the regulation of health research and pharmaceutical manufacturing/testing facilities.

The department is responsible to Parliament through the minister of health as part of the federal health portfolio. The deputy minister of health, the senior most civil servant within the department, is responsible for the day-to-day leadership and operations of the department and reports directly to the minister.

Originally created as the "Department of Health" in 1919—in the wake of the Spanish flu crisis—what is known as Health Canada today was formed in 1993 from the former Health and Welfare Canada department (established in 1944), which split into two separate units; the other department being Human Resources and Labour Canada.

== Organization ==
Health Canada's leadership consists of:

- Minister of Health
- Deputy Minister

=== Branches ===
The following branches, offices, and bureaus (and their respective services) fall under the jurisdiction of Health Canada:

- Health Canada
  - Office of Audit and Evaluation
    - Departmental Audit Committee
    - Director General / Chief Audit Executive's Office
    - Internal Audit and Special Examinations
    - Program Evaluation Division
    - Performance Measurement Planning and Integration
    - Practice Management
  - Chief Financial Officer Branch
    - Departmental Performance Measurement and Evaluation Directorate
    - Departmental Resource Management Directorate
    - Financial Operations Directorate
    - Internal Control Division
    - Materiel and Assets Management Directorate
    - Planning and Corporate Management Practices Directorate
  - Communications and Public Affairs Branch
    - Ethics and Internal Ombudsman Services
    - Marketing and Communications Services Directorate
    - Planning and Operations Division
    - Public Affairs and Strategic Communications Directorate
    - Stakeholder Relations and Consultation Directorate
  - Controlled Substances and Cannabis Branch
  - Corporate Services Branch
  - Health Products and Food Branch
    - Biologic and Radiopharmaceutical Drugs Directorate
    - Food Directorate
    - Marketed Health Products Directorate
    - Medical Devices Directorate
    - Natural and Non-prescription Health Products Directorate
    - Office of Nutrition Policy and Promotion
    - Policy, Planning and International Affairs Directorate
    - Resource Management and Operations Directorate
    - Therapeutic Products Directorate
    - Veterinary Drugs Directorate
  - Healthy Environments and Consumer Safety Branch
    - Consumer and Hazardous Products Safety Directorate
    - Environmental and Radiation Health Sciences Directorate
    - Pesticides Regulatory Directorate
    - Policy Planning and Integration Directorate
    - Safe Environments Directorate
      - Climate Change and Innovation Bureau
      - Water and Air Quality Bureau
      - New Substances Assessment and Control Bureau
      - Existing Substances Risk Assessment Bureau
  - Health Policy Branch
  - Legal Services
  - Regulatory Operations and Enforcement Branch

=== Partner agencies ===
In their responsibility of maintaining and improving the health of Canadians, the Minister of Health is supported by the Health Portfolio, which comprises Health Canada as well as:

- Public Health Agency of Canada;
- Canadian Institutes of Health Research;
- the Patented Medicine Prices Review Board; and
- the Canadian Food Inspection Agency

=== Regulatory Operations and Enforcement Branch ===
Established in 2016, the Regulatory Operations and Enforcement Branch provides support to Health Canada by enforcing the laws and regulations pertaining to the production, distribution, importation, sale, and/or use of consumer products, including but not limited to: tobacco, pest control materials, drugs and medical devices, biologics, and natural health products.

The Inspectorate conducts inspections and investigations to ensure that products are safe, of good quality, and properly labelled and distributed, in order to better protect Canadians from potentially harmful products and consumables.

The branch provides regulatory oversight for a variety of product categories, including:

- cannabis
- medical devices
- biological products
- controlled substances
- pesticides control products
- tobacco and vaping products
- drugs for humans and animals
- consumer and natural health products

=== Canada Vigilance Program ===
Health Canada's Canada Vigilance Program (CVP) "collects and assesses reports of suspected adverse reactions to health products marketed in Canada," including prescription and over-the-counter medications, natural health products, biotechnology products, vaccines, blood products, human cell products, human tissue products, human organs, disinfectants and radiopharmaceuticals. The program has been in effect since 1965.

Pharmacovigilance related to Adverse Events Following Immunization (AEFI) is a shared responsibility between Health Canada and the Public Health Agency of Canada.

== Related legislation ==
Acts for which Health Canada has total or partial responsibility:

- Assisted Human Reproduction Act
- Canada Health Act
- Canadian Centre on Substance Abuse Act
- Canadian Environmental Protection Act
- Canadian Institutes of Health Research Act
- Cannabis Act
- Controlled Drugs and Substances Act
- Comprehensive Nuclear Test-Ban Treaty Implementation Act
- Department of Health Act
- Financial Administration Act
- Fitness and Amateur Sport Act
- Food and Drugs Act
- Hazardous Materials Information Review Act
- Hazardous Products Act
- Patent Act
- Pest Control Products Act
- Pesticide Residue Compensation Act
- Quarantine Act
- Radiation Emitting Devices Act
- Tobacco and Vaping Products Act

Acts which Health Canada is involved or has special interest in:

- Broadcasting Act
- Canada Labour Code
- Canada Medical Act
- Canada Shipping Act
- Canadian Food Inspection Agency Act
- Emergency Preparedness Act
- Energy Supplies Emergency Act
- Excise Tax Act
- Federal-Provincial Fiscal Arrangements Act
- Feeds Act
- Immigration and Refugee Protection Act
- National Parks Act
- Nuclear Safety and Control Act
- Non-Smokers Health Act
- Queen Elizabeth II Canadian Research Fund Act
- Trade Marks Act

== Special access program ==
Through the Special Access Programs, health, dental and veterinary practitioners can request access non‑marketed drugs and medical devices that are not yet authorized for sale in Canada. The programs are for other treatments that have failed, are unsuitable or are unavailable.

== COVID-19 response ==
The chief medical advisor of Health Canada, Supriya Sharma, as of April 2021, oversaw the COVID-19 vaccine approval process in Canada.

In March 2021, the National Advisory Committee on Immunization made a declaration of a pause for the administration of the AstraZeneca vaccine to Canadians under the age of 55.

By 2023, Health Canada had authorized multiple vaccines and boosters, including Pfizer-BioNTech, Moderna, AstraZeneca, Novavax, and bivalent boosters, under both regular and rolling submissions.

== Criticisms ==
An editorial published by the Canadian Medical Association Journal has called for Health Canada to more strictly regulate natural health products. The editorial cited weaknesses in current legislation that allow natural health products to make baseless health claims, to neglect side-effects research prior to products reaching market, and to be sold without being evaluated by Health Canada.

On 10 September 2012, a report on CBC Television questioned the safety of drugs sold in North America. The Canadian Press reported that Health Canada is secretive regarding inspections about drugs manufactured overseas, leaving the public unsure about the safety of these drugs.

== Drug approvals process ==
Health Canada aims to provide responses to pharmaceutical innovators within 300 days of submitting a drug for review. However, for submissions filed between 2015 and 2019, only 33 percent received a response within that target. Fully 18 percent waited over a year, and almost 5 percent over two years. The average delay for a standard review was 335 days. Health Canada's accelerated pathway for approval dubbed "conditional compliance" reduces its target timeline to 200 days, but its actual average delay was still 302 days, and only 8 percent of applicants received responses within the 200-day target.

Since 2022, Health Canada has implemented "Agile Regulations," expanding the use of rolling submissions and greater reliance on trusted foreign regulators to accelerate market approvals.

== See also ==
- Health care in Canada
- Public Health Agency of Canada
- First Nations Health Authority
- U.S. Department of Health and Human Services (HHS)
- Centers for Disease Control and Prevention (CDC)
- Food and Drug Administration (FDA)
- European Medicines Agency (EMA)
- Japanese Ministry of Health, Labour and Welfare (MHLW)
- National Centre for Disease Control (NCDC)
