= Food and Drugs Act =

Canadian federal food and drugs regulation act

Parliament of Canada
- Long title: An Act respecting food, drugs, cosmetics and therapeutic devices Loi concernant les aliments, drogues, cosmétiques et instruments thérapeutiques
- Citation: R.S.C. 1985, c. F-27

Amended by
- Budget Implementation Act, 2023
- Status: In force (amended)

The Food and Drugs Act (French: Loi sur les aliments et drogues) is an act of the Parliament of Canada regarding the production, import, export, transport across provinces and sale of food, drugs, contraceptive devices and cosmetics (including personal cleaning products such as soap and toothpaste). It was first passed in 1920 and most recently revised in 1985. It attempts to ensure that these products are safe, that their ingredients are disclosed and that drugs are effective and are not sold as food or cosmetics. It also states that cures for disease listed in Schedule A (including cancer, obesity, anxiety, asthma, depression, appendicitis, and sexually transmitted diseases), cannot be advertised to the general public.

== Background ==
After the launch of the Federal Department of Health in 1919, the Food and Drugs Act was presented in late 1920. Rules and regulations developed under the Act established the requirements for licensing and creating drugs in Canada. The law granted the Minister of Health the right to cancel or suspend licenses of companies failing to comply with the requirements.

The Food and Drugs Act was not significantly modified until 1947 when the foundations were laid for the current market today. In 1951, drug manufacturers were required to submit a file for each new drug prior to marketing their product. However, during the early 1960s, the drug thalidomide, which had been approved to enter the market, resulted in the deaths of thousands of infants and severe birth defects in others when the drug was taken by women in early stages of pregnancy.

As a result of the problems caused by the drug thalidomide, the Act was revisited and strengthened by Health Canada. The revised version placed new requirements on manufacturers to provide evidence for efficacy in seeking a Notice of Compliance, which must be obtained before any drug could be sold. The manufacturer must meet all the requirements before making any drug available to the public, but once the drug passes with no adverse reactions and without any changes needed to the drug's formula, it may never be subjected to review by Health Canada again. Some health advocates want post-approval surveillance to watch for unexpected problems.

== Part I ==
Part I provides general interpretations of the terms, and provides details of each of the topics discussed on what the Act entails:

- Food
- Drugs
- Cosmetics
- Devices

== Part II ==
Part II of the Act focuses the administration and the Enforcement that allows the government to intervene with the manufacturer. It entails:

- Inspection, Seizure and forfeiture
- Analysis
- Power of the Minister
- Incorporation by Reference
- Regulations
- Interim Orders
- Marketing Authorization
- Offense and Punishment
- Exports

== Parts III and IV ==
Parts III (enacted in 1961) and IV (enacted in 1969) provided for implementation of controls required by the Convention on Psychotropic Substances. Part III dealt with "controlled" drugs such as amphetamine, methaqualone, and phenmetrazine, which have legitimate medical uses. Part IV focused on Schedule H "restricted drugs", those whose only legitimate use is for scientific research, such as the hallucinogens LSD, DMT, and MDMA. These parts established eight classes of regulated substances, ranging from Schedules A to H.

The 1996 Controlled Drugs and Substances Act repealed Parts III and IV.

== See also ==
- Therapeutic Products Directorate
- Food safety
- Medical device
- Food Bill 160-2 of New Zealand
- Food Safety Modernization Act
- Pledge to Africa Act
