= Sarfaraz K. Niazi =

Pakistani academic

Sarfaraz K. Niazi سرفراز خان نیازی
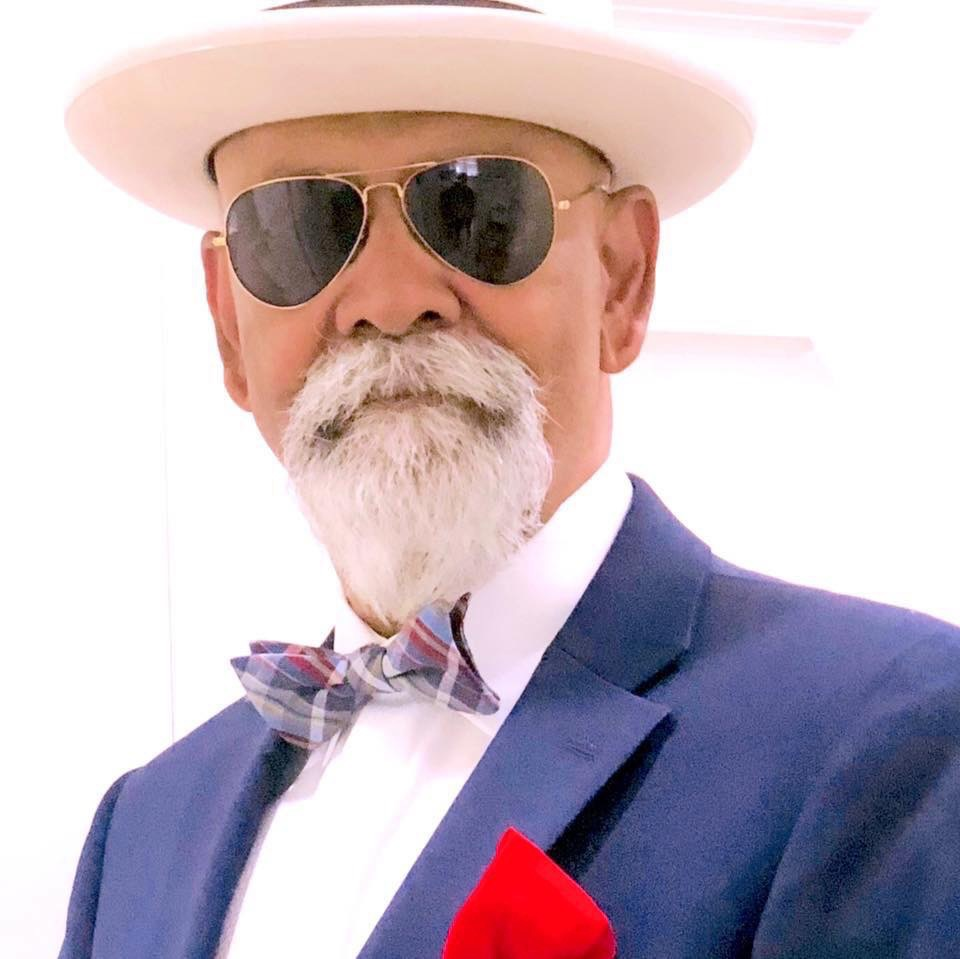
- Sarfaraz K. Niazi
- Born: 10 July 1949 (age 77); Lucknow, Uttar Pradesh, India
- Education: University of Illinois, Washington State University, and Karachi University.
- Known for: Biopharmaceuticals; Biosimilars; Ghazals; Ghalib
- Awards: Sitara-i-Imtiaz (2012); Inductee, Chicago Hall of Entrepreneurs (2015)
- Scientific career
- Fields: Pharmaceutical sciences Biopharmaceuticals; Recombinant manufacturing
- Workplaces: University of Illinois at Chicago; Aga Khan University Hospital; Higher Education Commission of Pakistan; University of Houston College of Pharmacy

Sarfaraz Khan Niazi (Urdu: سرفراز خان نیازی; born 10 July 1949) is a Pakistani-American academic and entrepreneur working in pharmaceutical sciences and biopharmaceutical manufacturing. He has written books in pharmaceutical sciences, biotechnology, consumer healthcare, and poetry. He has translated ghazals (love poems) of the Urdu poet Ghalib.

== Personal life ==
Niazi was born on 10 July 1949 in Lucknow in India, and moved to Karachi with his parents in 1962. His father was Niaz Fatehpuri, a scholar of religion and literature in Pakistan and India.

== Education ==
Niazi earned a Bachelor of Science degree in pharmacy from the University of Karachi in 1969. In 1970, he moved to the United States, where he obtained his Master of Science degree in pharmaceutical sciences in 1971 from Washington State University in Pullman, WA, and then moved to Illinois. In 1974, he obtained his doctorate in pharmaceutical sciences from the University of Illinois at Chicago. Washington State University lists him as a 1971 alumnus and an affiliate faculty member of its Department of Pharmaceutical Sciences.

== Employment ==
Niazi was an associate professor at the College of Pharmacy of the University of Illinois at Chicago and later an executive at Abbott Laboratories. In 1997, he established a consulting business, Pharmaceutical Scientist, Inc. In 2003, he launched Therapeutic Proteins International LLC with about US$1 million from friends and other investors; by 2014 the company was developing a biosimilar of Amgen's filgrastim (Neupogen).

== Academic appointments ==
Washington State University (WSU) states that he became UIC's youngest tenured professor at age 27. He is an adjunct professor of biopharmaceutical sciences at UIC and the University of Houston. WSU says he plans to help establish a biosimilar analytical testing centre at the college, and lists a period at the United Nations' International Centre for Genetic Engineering and Biotechnology in Italy among his earlier positions.

== Business ventures ==
A publisher's author biography says Therapeutic Proteins International was later renamed Adello Biologics, and The Center for Biosimilars describes Niazi as Adello's founder and as executive chairman of Karyo Biologics. Adello submitted a biologics licence application for its filgrastim biosimilar in 2017 and was a party to patent litigation with Amgen under the Biologics Price Competition and Innovation Act (BPCIA). In January 2019 Kashiv Pharma acquired Adello's assets and became Kashiv BioSciences. In 2022 the FDA approved Fylnetra (pegfilgrastim-pbbk), developed by Kashiv with Amneal Pharmaceuticals; Adello had worked on its brand name. WSU states that Niazi has raised more than US$500 million in investment capital over his career.

== Advisory and policy work ==
He is a member of the advisory board of The Center for Biosimilars, where he writes the "BioRationality" column.

In May 2022 Senator Ben Ray Luján introduced S. 4288, the Reducing Animal Testing Act, which would remove animal studies as a required part of biosimilar applications under the BPCIA. Niazi has written that he developed the amendment together with Luján's office; the senator's own press release does not name him. The same biosimilar provision appears in the FDA Modernization Act 2.0 (S. 5002), which passed the Senate on 29 September 2022. Niazi also published a letter in Science that year arguing for an end to animal testing in biosimilar approval.

== Poetry ==
In 2002, Niazi published the first complete translation of the ghazals of Mirza Asadullah Baig Khan, known as "Ghalib" and another in 2009. The translation was reviewed in The Tribune, whose reviewer praised the explications that accompany the translated ghazals. In 2023, Niazi published the first complete English translation of Ghalib's Persian love poems with Mariam Tawoosi

== Biosimilars ==
Niazi's primary research subject is the field of biosimilars. He has published multiple books on the subject and peer-reviewed research papers that advise developers on how to secure a faster approval of biosimilars by the FDA and EMA and suggest changes to harmonize approval guidelines. In May 2018, Niazi filed a Citizen Petition with the FDA proposing changes to the biosimilar approval process, including allowing a non-US-licensed comparator product without bridging studies.

== Awards ==
On 14 August 2012, the Government of Pakistan announced that President Asif Ali Zardari would be awarding the Sitara-i-Imtiaz in Engineering Science to Sarfaraz.

== Other honours and recognition ==
- Inducted into the Chicago Area Entrepreneurship Hall of Fame (UIC Institute for Entrepreneurial Studies), gala on 8 October 2015, listed as representing Therapeutic Proteins International, LLC.

== Textbooks and professional handbooks ==
- Handbook of Biogeneric Therapeutic Proteins: Regulatory, Manufacturing, Testing, and Patent Issues. Boca Raton, Florida: CRC, 2002. ISBN 9780849329913.
- Textbook of Clinical Pharmacokinetics and Biopharmaceutics. Bsp, India. 2010. ISBN 9789381075043.
- Handbook of Bioequivalence Testing. Boca Raton, Florida: CRC, 2014. ISBN 978-1482226379.
- Biosimilar and Interchangeable Biologics: From Cell Line to Commercial Launch, Two Volume Set 1st Edition. Boca Raton, Florida: CRC, CRC, 2015. ISBN 978-1482298918.
- Fundamentals of Bioprocess Engineering. Boca Raton, Florida: CRC, FL. 2015 ISBN 978-1466585737
- Love Sonnets of Ghalib. New Delhi: Rupa Publications, 2017. ISBN 978-8129148520.
- Biosimilarlity—The FDA Perspective. Boca Raton, Florida: CRC, 2018. ISBN 978-1498750394.
- Handbook of Pharmaceutical Manufacturing Formulations Volumes 1–6. Boca Raton, Florida: CRC, 2019. ISBN 978-1138103924.
- Handbook of Preformulation: Drugs, Botanicals, and Biological Pharmaceutical Products. Second edition. Boca Raton, Florida: CRC, 2019. ISBN 978-0367705640.
- Future of Pharmaceuticals. A Nonlinear Analysis. Boca Raton, Florida: CRC, 2022. ISBN 978-1138297555.
- mRNA Therapeutics--A Fast to Market Strategy. CRC Press, Boca Raton, Florida. ISBN 9781032163444
- Biopharmaceutical Manufacturing, Volume 1 Regulatory processes. Professor Sarfaraz K. Niazi, Sunitha Lokesh. Bristol, UK 2021. ISBN 978-0750331739.
- Biopharmaceutical Manufacturing, Volume 2 Unit Operations. Professor Sarfaraz K. Niazi, Sunitha Lokesh. Bristol, UK 2021. ISBN 978-0750331777.
- Wine of Love, Persian Ghazals of Ghalib, Translations, and Explications by Sarfaraz Niazi and Maryam Tawoosi Ghalib Academy of America ISBN 978-0-9714746-2-8.

== Selected recent publications ==
- Niazi, Sarfaraz K. (2025). "Scientific justification and policy recommendations to the US Food and Drug Administration for waiving comparative efficacy studies". Pharmaceuticals. 18: 779. doi:10.3390/ph18060779. PMC 12196284.
- Niazi, Sarfaraz K. (2025). "Quantum mechanics in drug discovery: a comprehensive review of methods, applications, and future directions". International Journal of Molecular Sciences. 26: 6325. doi:10.3390/ijms26136325. PMC 12249871.
- Niazi, Sarfaraz K. (2023). "The coming of age of AI/ML in drug discovery, development, clinical testing, and manufacturing: the FDA perspectives". Drug Design, Development and Therapy. 17: 2691–2725. doi:10.2147/DDDT.S424991.
- Niazi, Sarfaraz K. (2022). "The Inflation Reduction Act: a boon for the generic and biosimilar industry". Journal of Clinical Pharmacy and Therapeutics. 47: 1738–1751. doi:10.1111/jcpt.13783. PMC 9828046.
