= FTC v. Actavis, Inc. =

- Supreme Court of the United States

Argued March 25, 2013 Decided June 17, 2013
- Full case name: Federal Trade Commission v. Actavis, Inc., et al.
- Docket no.: 12-416
- Citations: 570 U.S. 136 (more) 133 S. Ct. 2223; 185 L. Ed. 2d 175; 2013 U.S. LEXIS 4545; 106 U.S.P.Q.2d 1953
- Argument: Oral argument
- Opinion announcement: Opinion announcement

Case history
- Prior: Injunction denied, In re Androgel Antitrust Lit., 687 F. Supp. 2d 1371 (N.D. Ga. 2010); affirmed, complaint dismissed, FTC v. Watson Pharmaceuticals, Inc., 677 F.3d 1298 (11th Cir. 2012); cert. granted, 568 U.S. 1066 (2012).

Holding
- Reverse payment settlements of patent litigations are not immune from antitrust liability.

Court membership
- Chief Justice John Roberts Associate Justices Antonin Scalia · Anthony Kennedy; Clarence Thomas · Ruth Bader Ginsburg; Stephen Breyer · Samuel Alito; Sonia Sotomayor · Elena Kagan

Case opinions
- Majority: Breyer, joined by Kennedy, Ginsburg, Sotomayor, Kagan
- Dissent: Roberts, joined by Scalia, Thomas
- Alito took no part in the consideration or decision of the case.

Laws applied
- Sherman Act; Hatch-Waxman Act

FTC v. Actavis, Inc., 570 U.S. 136 (2013), was a United States Supreme Court decision in which the Court held that the FTC could make an antitrust challenge under the rule of reason against a so-called pay-for-delay agreement, also referred to as a reverse payment patent settlement. Such an agreement is one in which a drug patentee pays another company, ordinarily a generic drug manufacturer, to stay out of the market, thus avoiding generic competition and a challenge to patent validity. The FTC sought to establish a rule that such agreements were presumptively illegal, but the Court ruled only that the FTC could bring a case under more general antitrust principles permitting a defendant to assert justifications for its actions under the rule of reason.

== Background ==
=== Hatch-Waxman ===
Under the "paragraph IV route" of the Hatch-Waxman Act, a generic drug manufacturer can assure the U.S. Food and Drug Commission (FDA) that it would not infringe upon the patent of a brand-name drug by proving that the patent was invalid or that the sale of the generic drugs will not violate the brand-name's patent. This would constitute a challenge to the patent, and usually lead to litigation between the brand-name and generic manufacturers. The FDA then must withhold approving the generic drugs for a 30-month period while the courts resolve the dispute. If the dispute does not resolve within that period, the FDA could then approve the generic for the market.

=== Androgel and generic versions ===
Respondent Solvay Pharmaceuticals filed a New Drug Application in 1999 and received a patent in 2003 for its brand-name drug, Androgel, used for treating low testosterone levels in men. Two generic-drug companies, Actavis and Paddock, filed patents for generic drugs that were modeled after Androgel later that year. Solvay then sued Actavis for patent infringement under "paragraph IV" litigation, but the FDA eventually approved Actavis's generic drug for the market after the dispute over the validity of Solvay's patent had continued for three years.

Rather than bringing its generic drug to the market, Actavis instead entered into a reverse payment settlement agreement with Solvay in 2006. Under the terms of the agreement, Actavis would keep its generic drug off the market for a "specified number of years" and also agree "to promote Androgel to doctors."

=== FTC sues ===
The Federal Trade Commission filed suit, alleging that Actavis had unlawfully abandoned its patent challenge by agreeing to share in the "monopoly profits" of Solvay, and withdrawing its generic drug from the market. Solvay was simultaneously accused of attempting to extend its monopoly rights further than what its patent would have conferred if otherwise left as valid.

=== Rulings of lower courts ===
Both the district court and Eleventh Circuit dismissed the plaintiff's claims. The district court ruled that the settlements did not provide unreasonable restraints outside the scope of the patents. The Eleventh Circuit ruled that the FTC had not shown that the reverse payment settlement excluded competition any more than the patent would have, stating that "although a patent holder may be able to escape the jaws of competition by sharing monopoly profits with the first one or two generic challengers, those profits will be eaten away as more and more generic companies enter the waters." Furthermore, the appeals court ruled, courts cannot require parties to litigate further in order to avoid antitrust liability.

== Opinion of the Court ==
The Court reversed the rulings of the lower courts. Justice Stephen Breyer delivered the opinion of a 5-3 Court. Chief Justice John Roberts dissented, joined by Justices Antonin Scalia and Clarence Thomas. Justice Samuel Alito took no part in the consideration or decision of the case.

=== Majority opinion ===
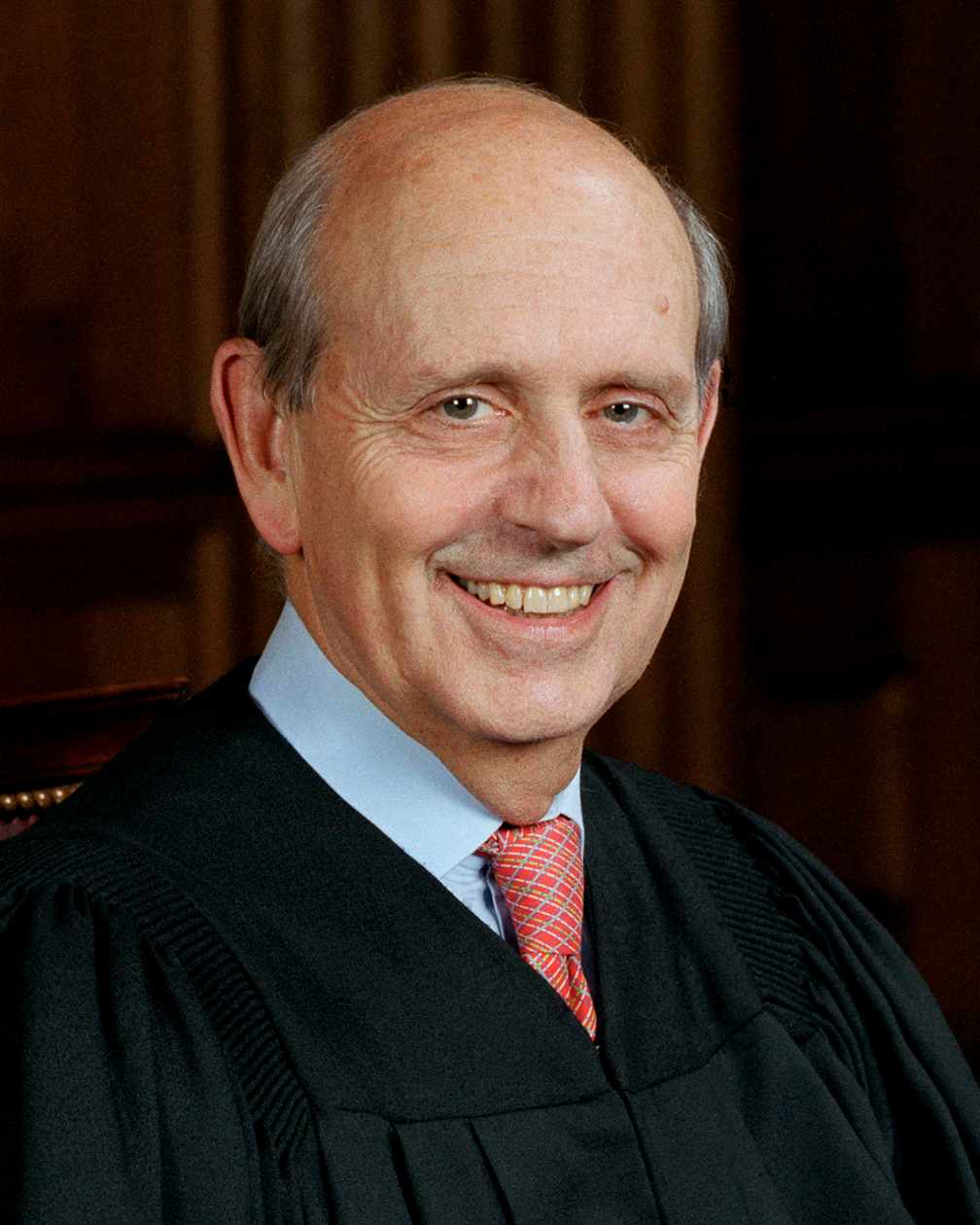
Stephen Breyer delivered the majority opinion

The majority opinion reversed the Eleventh Circuit's ruling that antitrust laws do not apply to patent holders so long as the anticompetitive effects of their reverse payment settlements fall within the scope their patent monopoly. Instead, the majority decided that the antitrust question cannot be answered only by measuring the anticompetitive effects against patent law policy, but also by measuring against "procompetitive" antitrust law policies. Therefore, if Solvay's reverse payment settlement falls within the exclusionary scope of its patent, that by itself does not "immunize the agreement from antitrust attack." Instead, the Court insisted, "patent and antitrust policies are both relevant in determining the 'scope of the patent monopoly'—and consequently antitrust law immunity—that is conferred by a patent." In addition, the majority pointed out the uniqueness of reverse payment settlements in which "the party with no claim on damages" is the one that pays the other party for the sake of staying out of the patentee's market contrasts with how a settlement would normally proceed, in which the patentee demands an amount as reparation for the damages done by the patent infringer. Noting this unusual distinction, the majority argued that reverse payments are not a normal form of settlement in patent suits, and thus cannot be scrutinized solely under the lens of patent law when there seems to be an anticompetitive purpose. Past precedent, such as United States v. Singer Mfg. Co. and United States v. New Wrinkle, Inc., shows that patent litigation settlements can be used for anticompetive purposes, so they must be considered in light of antitrust policy, as the Court did in such cases, in order to determine whether "patent law policy offsets the antitrust law policy strongly favoring competition." Furthermore, patent policy by itself is concerned lest agreements shield invalid patents from scrutiny; the Court has held such agreements unlawful "so the public will not continually be required to pay tribute to would-be monopolists without need or justification.'"

To be sure, there is a general legal policy favoring settlements. But "this patent-related factor should not determine the result here." The Court gave five reasons why it should not:

- Reverse payment settlements have "the potential for genuine adverse effects on competition." By paying a settlement that keeps its generic competitors out of the market, the patentee can set a price that's above the market level with its monopoly. With the profit it obtains from this monopoly, the patentee splits it with its original challenger and the consumer loses out in the form of higher drug prices due to a non-competitive market. In addition, under the Hatch-Waxman Act, only the first generic filer gains the coveted 180-day exclusive right to sell the generic brand of a drug. All subsequent filers do not get this right and must also be subjected to the same 30-month waiting period before FDA approval in paragraph IV litigation. As a result, a reverse payment settlement gets rid of the first and presumably most motivated competitor from the patentee's market.
- The anticompetitive consequences of reverse payment settlements will at least sometimes be unjustifiable. The majority recognized that there are situations in which settlements are justified in a patent dispute (e.g. saving litigation expenses, exchanging of services, etc.), but this does not warrant dismissing the FTC's complaint. If the settlement has legitimate reasons, then the antitrust defendant can prove it in court.
- When a reverse payment will likely bring about anticompetitive harm, the patentee likely has the power to bring about that harm. A brand-name manufacturer that can afford to pay large sums to its challengers to keep them out of the market likely has the power to continue to charge prices higher than the competitive level.
- Antitrust suits are more "administratively feasible" than what the Eleventh Circuit believed. Antitrust questions usually do not require litigation of patent validity. A large unexplained payment already suggests that a patentee has doubts about its patent's survival, and as such, would rather settle and split the monopoly profits rather than face the lower payoff of a competitive market. There is no need for a detailed examination of a patent's validity.
- A reverse payment settlement is not the only way to settle a lawsuit. Although a reverse payment risks antitrust liability, it does not necessarily reduce the possibility of settlement because there are other ways to settle, e.g. the patentee could allow the challenger entrance into the market prior to the patent's expiration, without payment. Reverse payments are still possible as a form of settlement, but it cannot be for the sake of sharing monopoly profits.

Due to the many factors and complexities that determine whether a reverse payment settlement causes anticompetitive harm ("its size, its scale in relation to the payor's anticipated future litigation costs, its independence from other services for which it might represent payment, and the lack of any other convincing justification"), the Court held, the FTC must still "prove its case as in other rule-of-reason cases" and thus ruled that reverse payments are neither presumptively legal nor presumptively illegal. The Court refused to be more specific about how the lower court should resolve the case on remand and what factors should be weighed against one another in the analysis. It said:

As in other areas of law, trial courts can structure antitrust litigation so as to avoid, on the one hand, the use of antitrust theories too abbreviated to permit proper analysis, and, on the other, consideration of every possible fact or theory irrespective of the minimal light it may shed on the basic question—that of the presence of significant unjustified anticompetitive consequences. We therefore leave to the lower courts the structuring of the present rule-of-reason antitrust litigation.

=== Dissent ===
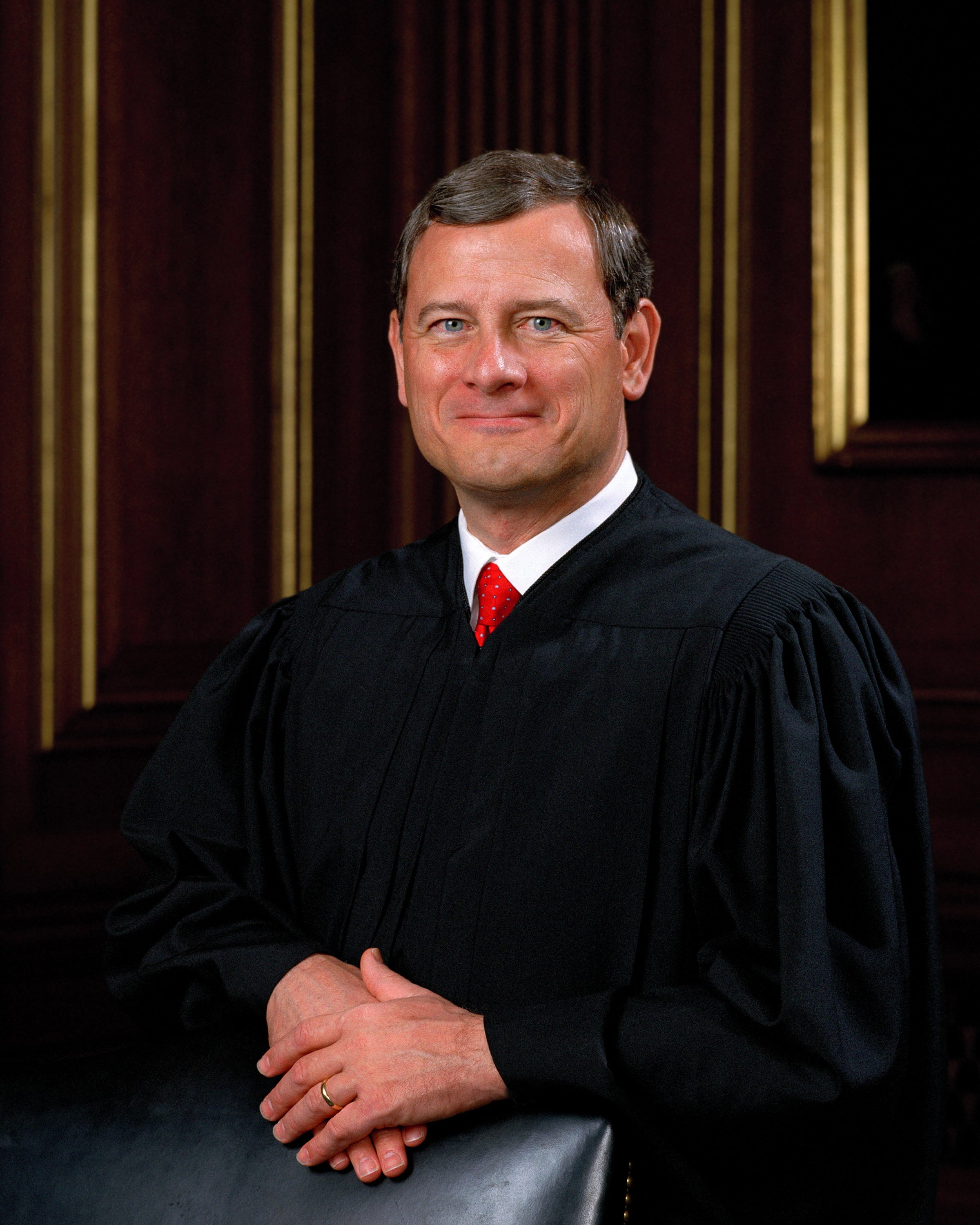
Chief Justice Roberts dissented

In contrast to the majority, the dissent rejected the application of antitrust law that the majority used for this case, arguing that it was a "novel approach" and "without any support in statute." Pointing out that a "patent carves out an exception to the applicability of antitrust laws," the dissenting opinion argued that it is only when a patent holder acts beyond the scope of its granted monopoly does scrutiny under antitrust law become applicable. Otherwise, the patent holder is operating within his rights to be excepted from antitrust liability. As a result, the dissent believed that the real question was whether the reverse payment settlement "gives Solvay monopoly power beyond what the patent already gave it."

The dissent concluded:

The majority today departs from the settled approach separating patent and antitrust law, weakens the protections afforded to innovators by patents, frustrates the public policy in favor of settling, and likely undermines the very policy it seeks to promote by forcing generics who step into the litigation ring to do so without the prospect of cash settlements. I would keep things as they were and not subject basic questions of patent law to an unbounded inquiry under antitrust law, with its treble damages and famously burdensome discovery.

== What constitutes a reverse payment? ==
Since the Actavis decision, a controversy has arisen over what constitutes a reverse payment agreement that is subject to antitrust scrutiny pursuant to Actavis. Suppose non-monetary consideration is paid—is that a reverse payment? The controversy largely centers on so-called No-AG agreements. A no-AG agreement (a no-authorized generic agreement) is an agreement by which a brand name drug firm agrees not to launch an authorized generic (a generic version of the brand name company's brand name drug, which it advertises as "authorized") in exchange for the generic manufacturer's promise not to market its generic product for a specified time.

== Commentary ==
Both sides declared victory after the opinion issued, and lauded the majority opinion. FTC Chairwoman Edith Ramirez issued a press release that praised the decision as having "made it clear that pay-for-delay agreements between brand and generic drug companies are subject to antitrust scrutiny, and it has rejected the attempt by branded and generic companies to effectively immunize these agreements from the antitrust laws."

Defendant Actavis's President and CEO Paul Bisaro stated:

We are pleased that the Court rejected the FTC's proposed 'quick look' test, and did not rule that settlement agreements are presumptively unlawful. Rather, the Court has established that the 'rule of reason' be applied, and left it to the lower courts to determine if the benefits of the settlement outweigh harm to consumers.

Lyle Dennison, in the SCOTUS Blog, opined that the decision presented a challenge to what has been the prominent practice of "pay-for-delay" settlements in the drug industry. With this ruling, he said, patent owners no longer maintain immunity from the "rule of reason" scrutiny of antitrust laws when making reverse payment settlements, even if the settlements are only for the terms of the patents. In effect, this limits patent owners' scope of power in holding their monopolies. In addition, as a result, using reverse–payment settlements to resolve patent disputes now carries a greater risk of coming under litigation, and being ruled as infringing of antitrust laws.

Alan Morrison, in the SCOTUS Blog, considers how one should litigate a reverse-payments case, based on the Court's opinion. Since not all reverse payments are anticompetitive, Morrison says, "A company with a very solid patent, but with the knowledge that there is always a chance it may be struck down and with the realization that even winning a patent case costs lots of money, may be willing to make a modest payment to gain several years of peace and profits." so the problem is "separating the wheat from the chaff." The Supreme Court in Actavis says "the antitrust laws forbid only those payments that are "large and unjustified.' " But what does that mean, Morrison asks, and tries to answer:

First, what is the baseline or even the universe against which large is to be measured? Annual gross revenues or net profits of the pioneer and/or the generic would be convenient yardsticks. But most companies have many products, with different sales and profit ratios, and so the company-wide figures are likely to be an inappropriate measure of what is too large. Moreover, in all these deals, the non-compete lasts only so long, and so the open period has to be somehow taken into account.

Even harder to decide is whether the payment is justified. How does one factor in probability of establishing liability? How does one determine what damages would probably be? "In short, the Court may have created a theoretically beautiful lawsuit model that cannot work in practice." Morrison proposes a court's determination that the public interest is served by the settlement and an antitrust immunity if the court approves it. He concludes, "While a court-approval procedure would not be without difficulty, it seems like a much more sensible approach than the kind of open-ended litigation over whether a prior settlement was too large and not justified, which is what the Court in Actavis created."

Bloomberg Law writers thought that the implications of the decision could impact the effect of antitrust laws on general intellectual property cases, outside of the drug industry. Specifically, the outcome could be applied to general cases regarding "patent pools, cross-licensing arrangements, and more routine patent licensing decisions."

Jason S. Oliver, in Lexology, argued that the case will reduce the number of settlements with respect to patent litigation. However, the Court "did not set forth a clear structure for reviewing settlement agreements and left this job to the district courts," which still leaves the full effect of this case to be determined, even with respect to generic drug manufacturers.

== See also ==
- Patent infringement
- United States antitrust law
- Rule of reason
