= 505(b)(2) regulatory pathway =

Application process for US generic drug approval

The 505(b)(2) regulatory pathway is a process for submitting a specific new drug application (NDA) with the Food and Drug Administration in the United States. It is designed for complex generic or biosimilar medications that can share historical public data from a drug that has been previously approved, therefore streamlining the regulatory review for a faster approval.

== Regulatory process ==
The legal authority is derived from 1984 when the Drug Price Competition and Patent Term Restoration Act was added to the Food Drug & Cosmetic Act of 1938.

The 505(b)(2) is designed for producing generic medications which have an established reference listed drug (RLD). In referencing a previously approved drug, the new medication can cite public data and proceed through reduced testing.

The new generic medication is required to be equivalent to the original reference drug in its therapeutic effect and pharmaceutical and biological composition. If equivalence is demonstrated then a company would submit the new generic drug to the FDA in the 505(b)(2) application.

The 505(b)(2) process is one of three pathways for drug approvals in the United States; the others including the 505(b)(1) and 505(j) abbreviated new drug application (ANDA).

=== Allowable drug changes within 505(b)(2) ===
Companies might produce one of several changes within a medication to qualify for the 505(b)(2) generic review, including a different dosage amount or type (like injection vs. oral), a change to the formula or ingredients, or a new clinical use for a different symptom or disease.

=== Effect in drug approvals ===
Drug companies can expect lower expenses and faster approval by using the 505(b)(2) application, as a result of access to the data from the reference drug, a lower testing threshold and an abbreviated approval timeline.

Regulatory bodies, particularly the FDA, have had to maintain safe review processes that deliver the benefits of new medications. This is enabled with the 505(b)(2) process that uses the previously reviewed and approved drug application to create new generic versions with emerging pharmaceutical methods like nanotechnology and complex generic modifications.
