= C845H1343N223O243S9 =

The molecular formula C_{845}H_{1343}N_{223}O_{243}S_{9} (molar mass: 18802.638 g/mol) may refer to:

- Filgrastim
- Pegfilgrastim
