= Amneal Pharmaceuticals =

American publicly traded generics and specialty pharmaceutical company

- Amneal logo as of 2026
- Type: Public
- Traded as: Nasdaq: AMRX (Class A); Russell 2000 component; S&P 600 component
- Founded: 2002
- Founders: Chirag Patel; Chintu Patel, R. Ph
- Headquarters: Bridgewater Township, New Jersey
- Number of locations: Seven manufacturing plants in Branchburg and Piscataway, NJ; Brookhaven and Hauppauge, NY, India and Ireland; & Distribution/Commercial Operations in Glasgow, KY
- Products: Generic and specialty pharmaceuticals; biosimilars
- Revenue: ▲US$3.02 billion (2025)
- Net income: ▲US$72.1 million (2025)
- Number of employees: 8,100
- Website: amneal.com

Amneal Pharmaceuticals, Inc. is an American publicly traded pharmaceutical company that develops, manufactures and distributes generics and specialty pharmaceutical products. The company is headquartered in Bridgewater, New Jersey, and is one of the largest manufacturers of generic drugs in the United States.

== History ==
Amneal Pharmaceuticals was founded in 2002 by brothers Chirag and Chintu Patel. The company manufactured its first prescription product in 2005 and received its first Abbreviated New Drug Application (ANDA) approval from the U.S. Food and Drug Administration (FDA) in 2006.

In 2007, the company acquired five divested drugs from Mylan which Mylan was forced to sell as part of their acquisition of the generic's unit of Merck KGaA. At this time, the company was noted as being a private company based in Paterson, New Jersey.

That same year, it acquired Akyma Pharmaceuticals, a Glasgow, Kentucky-based regional distributor, and began marketing products under the Amneal label.

In 2008, Amneal expanded internationally with the opening of a research and development center in Gujarat, India. Continued expansion in the United States occurred between 2010 and 2016 in New Jersey, New York and Kentucky. As of 2017, the company had grown much of its physical footprint and product base through a series of acquisitions, including the acquisition of assets from Pfizer, Actavis and Warner Chilcott.

=== Formation of Amneal Pharmaceuticals Inc ===
In 2018, Amneal Pharmaceuticals LLC merged with Impax Laboratories, Inc. to form Amneal Pharmaceuticals, Inc. The FTC described the merger as having a value of US$1.45 billion, and required the companies to divest several marketed products and development projects as a condition of the approval. The merger was completed in May 2018, with shares of IPXL ceasing trading on NASDAQ on May 4 and shares of AMRX commencing trading on the NYSE on May 7. The company's predecessor entity, privately held Impax Pharmaceuticals, Inc., was founded in 1995. Publicly traded Global Pharmaceutical Corporation and Impax Pharmaceuticals, Inc. completed a reverse merger, forming Impax Laboratories, Inc. on December 14, 1999.

In August 2019, co-founders Chirag and Chintu Patel became co-CEOs of the company, while Paul Meister served as chairman. The Patel brothers focused on more investment into specialized drugs using the 505(b)(2) regulatory process, while continuing to expand the company's generic pipeline.

In December 2019, Amneal announced it had entered into an agreement to acquire a majority interest in AvKARE, a private label provider of generic pharmaceuticals in the US federal agency sector. Under the agreement, AvKARE would continue to operate as an independent subsidiary of Amneal.

In January 2021, the business announced it would acquire 98% of Kashiv BioSciences LLC and its drug delivery platforms.

In November 2021, Amneal acquired Punishka Healthcare and expanded its capacity to manufacture injectable medicines in Punishka's 293,000 sq. foot manufacturing facility near Ahmedabad, India.

In January 2022, Amneal announced it would acquire Saol Therapeutics Baclofen franchise for around $83.5 million, plus future royalties.

=== List of mergers and acquisitions ===
The following is an illustration of the company's major mergers and acquisitions and historical predecessors:

- Amneal Pharmaceuticals, Inc.
  - Amneal Pharmaceuticals (Merged 2018)
    - Amneal Pharmaceuticals LLC
      - Akyma Pharmaceuticals (Acq. 2007)
    - Impax Laboratories, Inc.
  - Gemini Laboratories (Acq. 2018)
  - AvKARE (Acq. 2019)
  - Kashiv Specialty Pharma LLC (Acq. 2021)
  - Punishka Healthcare (Acq. 2021)
  - Saol Therapeutics' Baclofen (Acq. 2022)

== Operations ==
=== Research and development ===
As of July 2019, Amneal operated seven Research and Development (R&D) centers in the United States, India and Ireland. According to the company, 10% of net revenue is invested in R&D.

After the Impax merger, Amneal was reportedly the fifth largest U.S. generic drug maker in the United States with a generics portfolio inclusive of more than 200 product families, approximately 149 ANDAs filed with the FDA, and 135 projects in development at that time.

==== Biosimilars ====
Biosimilars are a focus of Amneal's drug development as a category that promises more affordable medicines and a high-growth marketplace.

The company's research and development activity in the biosimilar space has included a 2017 partnership with Adello Biologics (for the collaborative development of Neupogen and Neuasta biosimilars) and a 2018 partnership with mAbxience (for the development of Avastin biosimilars).

In 2022, Amneal received FDA approval for its first biosimilar medications, Releuko and Alymsys, which each treat various symptoms of cancer.

Amneal is taking advantage of regulatory opportunities to streamline the biosimilar approval process with the FDA, primarily in the 505(b)(2) new drug applications. In 2024, Amneal saw the approval of four biosimilar injectable drugs, including Boruzu, another treatment for symptoms of cancer.

=== Global operations ===
Amneal's first facility in India was built in 2006 in Rajoda, Ahmedabad. The most recent was built in 2022 to produce injectable medications. There were nine facilities across the country as of 2023, from a total investment of $500 million. In October 2024 the company announced another $200 investment to develop two new facilities in Ahmedabad to produce weight loss drugs.

The company began selling medication in India in October 2022.

Amneal's CEO, Chirag Patel, is a member of the US-India CEO Forum, and was appointed the US Chair of the Healthcare and Pharmaceutical Working Group in 2023.

In September 2023, Amneal received approval to launch its first product in China, Sevelamer carbonate. Amneal has been collaborating with a domestic Chinese partner since 2019 to secure approvals, and has six other products in the review process.

=== Pharmaceutical products ===
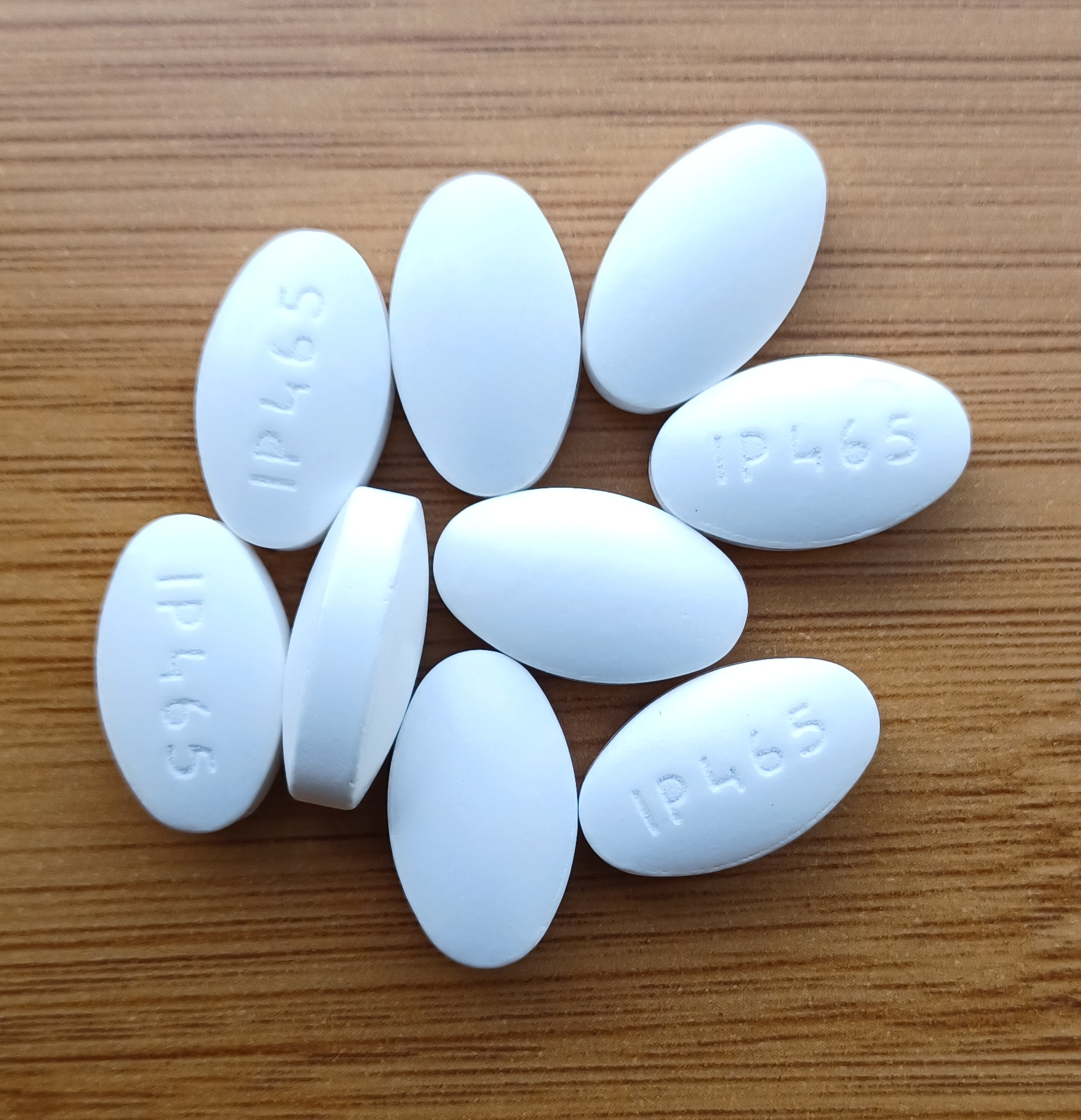
600mg ibuprofen tablets manufactured by Amneal Pharmaceuticals

Amneal's Generics Division focuses on a broad range of therapeutic areas, including solid oral dosage products and alternative dosage form products.

The company's Specialty Pharma Division is focused on the development of proprietary branded pharmaceutical products for the treatment of Central Nervous System disorders, Endocrine disorders and other select specialty segments.

This division commercializes several branded pharmaceutical products, including Rytary, an extended-release oral capsule formulation for the treatment of Parkinson's disease, Unithroid, for treatment of hypothyroidism, Emverm, for treatment of certain gastrointestinal infections, and Zomig Nasal Spray, for the acute treatment of migraines.

In 2020, in response to the interest in chloroquine and hydroxychloroquine during the COVID-19 pandemic, and before the United States Food and Drug Administration's emergency use authorization was withdrawn, Amneal ramped up production.

In September 2023, Amneal received FDA approval to produce the first generic version of the ADHD medication Vyvanse, which had become in short supply earlier in the year. Amneal has continued to launch new drugs to meet demand among US drug shortages.

==== Crexont ====
In September 2022 Amneal filed for FDA approval of a new specialty drug labeled IPX-203, (carbidopa-levodopa) which is designed to help control symptoms in Parkinson's disease patients for a longer duration. Successful clinical trials of the longer-acting levodopa drug were reported in AUgust, 2021 from a trial of 506 patients. An extended trial of 419 patients in 2023 also found that three doses of the new drug were more effective than five doses of prior formations, as reported in the American Academy of Neurology.

Amneal released the drug under the name "Crexont", with expectations that the drug would become its highest earning specialty product upon release.

==== Narcan ====
In April 2024, The FDA approved Amneal's Narcan (Naloxone), an over-the-counter nasal spray that temporarily blocks the effects of opioids and can reverse an overdose. Amneal partnered with the state of California to provide 3.2 million Narcan packs at a 40% reduced price to help increase drug access for first responders, universities and other local facilities.

==== GLP-1 ====
In 2024 Amneal made plans to build two new factories in Ahmedabad, India, specifically to produce new weight loss drugs. The total investment for the project ranges from 150 - 300 million USD, and is in partnership with the drug developer Metsera. Metsera released positive results of its weight-loss drug MET-097 earlier in 2024.
