= Approved =

Approved may refer to:

- Approved drug, a preparation that has been validated for a therapeutic use by a ruling authority of a government
- Approved, a 2013 album by Chester Thompson Trio
- Approved (Ubiquitous Synergy Seeker album)
