= Drug Price Competition and Patent Term Restoration Act =

US law

- Long title: An Act to amend the Federal Food, Drug, and Cosmetic Act to revise the procedures for new drug applications, to amend title 35, United States Code, to authorize the extension of the patents for certain regulated products, and for other purposes.
- Acronyms (colloquial): Hatch–Waxman amendments
- Enacted by: the 98th United States Congress
- Effective: September 24, 1984

Citations
- Public law: 98-417
- Statutes at Large: 98 Stat. 1585

Codification
- Acts amended: Federal Food, Drug, and Cosmetic Act
- Titles amended: 21 U.S.C.: Food and Drugs
- U.S.C. sections amended: 21 U.S.C. ch. 9 § 301; 21 U.S.C. ch. 9, subch. V §§ 355 & 360cc

Legislative history
- Introduced in the Senate as S. 1538 by Charles Mathias (R–MD) on June 23, 1983; Committee consideration by Judiciary; Passed the Senate on June 29, 1984 (voice vote agreed); Passed the House on September 6, 1984 (voice vote agreed, with amendments); Reported by the joint conference committee on September 6, 1984; agreed to by the Senate (agreeing to House amendments) on September 12, 1984 (voice vote) and by the Senate on September 19, 1984 (signed); Signed into law by President Ronald Reagan on September 24, 1984

The Drug Price Competition and Patent Term Restoration Act (Public Law 98-417), informally known as the Hatch–Waxman Act, is a 1984 United States federal law that established the modern system of generic drug regulation in the United States. The Act's two main goals are to facilitate entry of generic drugs into the market and to compensate the original drug developers for regulatory delays by the Food and Drug Administration. It is generally believed that the Act accomplished both goals: encouraging development of new medications and accelerating market entry of generics.

Representative Henry Waxman of California and Senator Orrin Hatch of Utah sponsored the act.

== Background ==
This law was formed as a way for Congress to balance interests of innovator pharmaceutical companies with generic pharmaceutical companies. Although the Federal Food, Drug, and Cosmetic Act passed in 1938, this statute made it possible for generic companies to get regulatory approval for drugs by filing an Abbreviated New Drug Application (ANDA).

In 1962 through the Kefauver–Harris Amendment Congress began requiring that manufacturers prove the safety and effectiveness of their product, through a series of tests, before introducing it to the market. This increased the cost of innovation for new drugs and decreased the value of drug patents for a new drug. Under these regulatory laws the company introducing a new drug must obtain the patent first and then have to prove this efficacy requirement which could take many years, so they were losing years that the product was patent protected, before it even hit the market. The new amendments reduced the potential profits gained from patents for the company introducing a new drug.

In the early 1980s it became clear that very few generics were coming to market. Congress studied the issue and realized that under patent and regulatory law it was easy for innovator companies to make it difficult for generic companies to successfully file ANDAs, and that the regulatory pathway to get ANDAs approved was lengthy, expensive, and uncertain. The Drug Price Competition and Patent Term Restoration Act was created in response to a court case called Roche Products, Inc. v. Bolar Pharmaceutical Co., The United States Court of Appeals for the Federal Circuit (CAFC's ) decision in Roche Products, Inc. v. Bolar Pharmaceutical Co., which interpreted existing U.S. law as prohibiting generic competitors from developing or performing tests on their generic versions required for FDA approval before the innovator companies patent has expired.In 1980 congress introduced the “paper NDA” that allowed generic drugs to be recognized as “generally safe” for public consumption through data that was already publicly available, but did not require them to go through the whole process of testing required for an NDA.

== Provisions ==
Hatch–Waxman amended the Federal Food, Drug, and Cosmetic Act. Section 505(j) of the Act, codified as 21 U.S.C. § 355(j), outlines the process for pharmaceutical manufacturers to file an Abbreviated New Drug Application (ANDA) for approval of a generic drug by the Food and Drug Administration (FDA).

The Act gives drug innovators some protection while facilitating and providing incentives for companies to file ANDAs.

Drug innovators were given protections in two ways. First, a new kind of market exclusivity was introduced, by means of a new five-year period of data exclusivity awarded when the FDA approves marketing of a drug that is a new chemical entity; during that period the FDA cannot approve a generic version of the drug. This provides market exclusivity for the drug innovator outside of any patent rights. Second, the Act allows the life of patents covering a drug to be extended by a portion of the time the drug is under regulatory review by the FDA, ensuring that regulatory review will not unduly consume patent life. The Act also requires the drug innovator to give the FDA the numbers of patents it believes cover its drug; the FDA does not evaluate whether the patents cover the drug, but publicly lists them in the Orange Book, and these are the patents the life of which is extended if there are regulatory delays.

The Act facilitates the filing of ANDAs by generic companies by preventing the FDA from asking a generic company to provide anything other than information on how it is going to manufacture the drug, quality assurance, and a study showing that the drug acts the same in a human as the innovator drug; this is called bioequivalence. This part of the Act is one of few pieces of legislation that restricts the powers and reach of a federal agency. The Act also gives generic companies safe harbor from patent infringement lawsuits during the time when the generic company is preparing its ANDA; during that time the generic company needs to learn how to manufacture the drug, manufacture a test batch, and run bioequivalence studies, all activities for which it could be sued for infringement. This protection is called the research exemption.

When a company is ready to file its ANDA, the Act requires it to declare how its activities when it begins to market the drug will relate to patents listed in the Orange Book; there are four options, or "certifications": it can state that there never were patents listed, that listed patents have expired, that it will not market the drug until all the patents listed in the Orange Book have expired, or that it believes the patents in the Orange Book are not relevant or are invalid. These four alternatives are called the Paragraph I, II, III, and IV certifications (named after Section 505(j)(2)(A)(vii)(IV)).

Rather than invalidate pharmaceutical patents upon approval of a generic version, the law treats a paragraph IV certification as permissible patent infringement that the inventor may challenge in court within 45 days of filing. To incentivize development of generic medications, the Hatch–Waxman Act provides 180 days of market exclusivity to whichever generic manufacturer first files a paragraph IV certification. In response to literal camping outside FDA offices, the agency announced in 2003 that paragraph IV certifications filed on the same day would share market exclusivity.

== Consequences ==
Passage of the law prompted a gold rush into the generic industry and a crush of applications, which the FDA was not prepared to handle. A series of scandals soon arose that shook public confidence in generic drugs; there were several instances in which companies obtained bioequivalence data fraudulently, by using the branded drug in their tests instead of their own product, and a congressional investigation found corruption at the FDA, where employees were accepting bribes to approve some generic companies' applications and delaying or denying others.

=== Impact: legal complexities ===
With time the law became successful in promoting the introduction of generics; in 1983 only 35% of top-selling branded drugs with expired patents had generic competition, and only 13% of prescriptions were for generics but in 2012, 84% of prescriptions in the US were filled with generic drugs.

There have been issues with litigation incentivized by the Act. Once the parties are in litigation, they can choose to fight the litigation to the end, or they may choose to settle the litigation. Some of these settlements have been found to be invalid reverse payment patent settlement agreements and have been struck down in court.

The FDA has been slow to adopt regulations for the introduction of generic versions of biopharmaceutical drugs (known as "biosimilars") because proving biosimilarity and quality control for biopharmaceuticals is much more complicated than for small molecule drugs. Innovator companies have emphasized those complications while generic companies, insurance companies, and consumers have advocated for the FDA to finalize their process.

According to a 2025 paper in the Journal of Economic Perspectives, the net result of the Act is "a convoluted and expensive approach to balancing innovation and competition".
