= Roche Products, Inc. v. Bolar Pharmaceutical Co. =

United States court case

- Court: United States Court of Appeals for the Federal Circuit
- Full case name: Roche Products, Inc. v. Bolar Pharmaceutical Co., Inc.
- Decided: April 23, 1984
- Citation: 733 F.2d 858 (1984)

Case history
- Prior history: 572 F. Supp. 255 (E.D.N.Y. 1983)

Court membership
- Judges sitting: Howard Thomas Markey, Philip Nichols, Jr., Shiro Kashiwa

Case opinions
- Majority: Nichols, joined by Markey, Kashiwa

Roche Products, Inc. v. Bolar Pharmaceutical Co., 733 F.2d 858 (Fed. Cir. 1984), was a court case in the United States related to the manufacturing of generic pharmaceuticals.

Bolar was a generic drug manufacturer. Roche was a brand-name pharmaceutical company which made and sold a sleep aid Dalmane, the active ingredient of which Flurazepam was protected by patent.

Before patent expiration, Bolar used the patented chemical in experiments to determine if its generic product was bioequivalent to Dalmane in order to obtain FDA approval for its generic version of Dalmane. Bolar argued that its use of the patented product was not infringement under the experimental use exception to the patent law.

The Court of Appeals for the Federal Circuit rejected Bolar’s contention holding that the experimental use exception did not apply because Bolar intended to sell its generic product in competition with Roche’s Dalmane after patent expiration and, therefore, Bolar’s experiments had a business purpose.

Bolar also argued that public policy in favor of availability of generic drugs immediately following patent expiration justified the experimental use of the patented chemical because denying such use would extend Roche’s monopoly beyond the date of patent expiration. The court rejected this argument, stating that such policy decisions should be made by Congress. Likewise, the court decided that apparent policy conflicts between statutes such as the Food and Drug Act and the Patent Act should be decided by Congress and not the courts.

Shortly after Roche v. Bolar was decided, Congress did pass a law permitting use of patented products in experiments for the purpose of obtaining FDA approval (section 271-e-1 of the Drug Price Competition and Patent Term Restoration Act, informally known as the "Hatch-Waxman Act" [Public Law 98-417], which established the modern system for FDA approval of generic drugs).

In some non-U.S. jurisdictions, the research exemption is known as the Bolar exemption, after this case.
