= Morissette v. United States =

- Supreme Court of the United States

Argued October 9–10, 1951 Decided January 7, 1952
- Full case name: Morissette v. United States
- Citations: 342 U.S. 246 (more) 72 S. Ct. 240; 96 L. Ed. 288; 1952 U.S. LEXIS 2714

Case history
- Prior: Cert. to the United States Court of Appeals for the Sixth Circuit

Holding
- Mere omission of any mention of intent from the criminal statute was not to be construed as the elimination of that element from the crimes denounced, and that where intent was an element of the crime charged, its existence was a question of fact to be determined by the jury.

Court membership
- Chief Justice Fred M. Vinson Associate Justices Hugo Black · Stanley F. Reed; Felix Frankfurter · William O. Douglas; Robert H. Jackson · Harold H. Burton; Tom C. Clark · Sherman Minton

Case opinion
- Majority: Jackson, joined by unanimous
- Minton took no part in the consideration or decision of the case.

Morissette v. United States, 342 U.S. 246 (1952), is a U.S. Supreme Court case, relevant to the legal topic of criminal intent. It described two classes of crimes, those requiring a mental state, and those that do not. It did not delineate a precise line between them. In one class are traditional crimes, some of which have been around since before laws existed, such as stealing. This first class of crimes required a jury to find both an act, a harm, and an intent to act against the law. The second class, public welfare offenses, did not require a criminal mental state such as intent or knowledge. These included regulatory laws necessary for the public health and welfare, such as relating to food and drug safety.

Morissette was a recycler who collected spent bomb casings from an Air Force practice bombing range, thinking they were abandoned, then sold them as scrap metal for $84.00. He was charged and convicted of "knowingly" converting government property to himself or the junk dealer. He defended that he honestly believed the casings were abandoned, and appealed. The Supreme Court reversed the conviction on the basis that "an injury can amount to a crime only when inflicted by intention", that the person must intend to commit a crime.

The court wrote that it is "universal... in mature systems of law", that if there is to be punishment for a harmful act, there must be "some mental element". Crime is a "compound concept, generally constituted only from the concurrence of an evil-meaning mind with an evil-acting hand... As the states codified the common laws of crimes [wrote specific criminal laws], even if enactments were silent on the subject" of intention, and omitted to include it in the code, the state courts assumed the omission did not mean the legislature meant to exclude the requirement that a jury find criminal intent. Rather, it was evidence that "intent was so inherent" in the meaning of the concept of what constitutes a "crime", that it did not need to be mentioned in the statute.

At the same time, the Morissette opinion acknowledges that the category of criminal legislation encompassing the statute in question must be distinguished from a different category of criminal statutes applicable to public welfare offenses. The Court notes that public welfare offenses, unlike common law crimes, do not intrinsically involve harm to the State, persons, property, or public morals, but are typified only by "neglect where the law requires care, or inaction where it imposes a duty." Public welfare offenses — examples of which include public health laws, building codes, or food and drug safety laws — do not require a mental state or awareness on the part of the defendant.

== Background ==
The defendant, a part-time scrap metal dealer, entered an Air Force bombing range near Oscoda, Michigan, from which he collected spent bomb casings. These casings had been lying around for years. The defendant sold the casings at a junk market, earning a profit of $84. For this, the defendant was charged with violating 18 U.S.C. § 641 which made it a crime to "knowingly convert" government property. The defendant conceded he had done the act. His sole defense was that he believed that the casings were abandoned property, and therefore there was no crime in taking them.

After the trial, the trial judge instructed the jury with regard to the law, rejecting the defense. With regard to the intent requirement, "knowingly," the trial judge assumed Congress had meant for the statute to operate under a tort law definition of intent. The jury was instructed to find only that the defendant "intentionally exercised dominion over the property."

Thus, the jury was permitted to find the defendant guilty solely on the basis of his having taken government property. They need not have found, and were not entitled to consider, any belief he may have had with respect to the abandonment of the bomb casings - that is, whether it was government property (which is clearly defined by the plain language of the statute as a crime), or abandoned property (which is not a crime). Were this reading of the statute correct, Congress would have created a strict liability crime.

The Court of Appeals affirmed the decision of the lower court. However, the Supreme Court, as final arbiter of federal law, heard an appeal and reversed the decision of the trial court, concluding that the defendant must be proven to have had knowledge of the facts that made the conversion wrongful, that is, that the property had not been abandoned by its owner. Justice Robert Jackson, writing for a unanimous Court, emphasized the importance of individual criminal intent (mens rea) in the Anglo-American legal tradition, stating famously that crime was "generally constituted only from concurrence of an evil-meaning mind with an evil-doing hand."

At the same time, the Morissette opinion acknowledges that the category of criminal legislation encompassing the statute in question must be distinguished from a different category of criminal statutes applicable to public welfare offenses. The Court notes that public welfare offenses, unlike common law crimes, do not intrinsically involve harm to the State, persons, property, or public morals, but are typified only by "neglect where the law requires care, or inaction where it imposes a duty." Public welfare offenses — examples of which include public health laws, building codes, or food and drug safety laws — do not require a mental state or awareness on the part of the defendant.

Andrew J. Transue was the attorney for the plaintiff.

== See also ==
- List of United States Supreme Court cases, volume 342
