= Research exemption =

In patent law, the research exemption or safe harbor exemption is an exemption to the rights conferred by patents, which is especially relevant to drugs. According to this exemption, despite the patent rights, performing research and tests for preparing regulatory approval, for instance by the FDA in the United States, does not constitute infringement for a limited term before the end of patent term. This exemption allows generic manufacturers to prepare generic drugs in advance of the patent expiration.

In the United States, this exemption is also technically called § 271(e)(1) exemption or Hatch–Waxman exemption. In 2005, the U.S. Supreme Court considered the scope of the Hatch-Waxman exemption in Merck v. Integra. The Supreme Court held that the statute exempts from infringement all uses of compounds that are reasonably related to submission of information to the government under any law regulating the manufacture, use or distribution of drugs.

In Canada, this exemption is known as the Bolar provision or Roche–Bolar provision, named after the case Roche Products v. Bolar Pharmaceutical.

In the European Union, equivalent exemptions are allowed under the terms of EC Directives 2001/82/EC (as amended by Directive 2004/28/EC) and 2001/83/EC (as amended by Directives 2002/98/EC, 2003/63/EC, 2004/24/EC and 2004/27/EC).

== Common law research exemption ==
The common law research exemption is an affirmative defense to infringement where the alleged infringer is using a patented invention for research purposes. The doctrine originated in the 1813 decision by Justice Joseph Story appellate decision Whittemore v. Cutter, 29 Fed. Cas. 1120 (C.C.D. Mass. 1813). Story famously wrote that the intent of the legislature could not have been to punish someone who infringes "merely for [scientific] experiments, or for the purpose of ascertaining the sufficiency of the machine to produce its described effects." Subsequent decisions later distinguished between commercial and non-commercial research.

In 2002, the Court of Appeals for the Federal Circuit dramatically limited the scope of the research exemption in Madey v. Duke University, 307 F.3d 1351, 1362 (Fed. Cir. 2002). The court did not reject the defense, but left only a "very narrow and strictly limited experimental use defense" for "amusement, to satisfy idle curiosity, or for strictly philosophical inquiry." The court also precludes the defense where, regardless of profit motive, the research was done "in furtherance of the alleged infringer’s legitimate business." In the case of a research university like Duke University, the court held that the alleged use was in furtherance of its legitimate business - namely "increas[ing] the status of the institution and lur[ing] lucrative research grants", and thus the defense was inapplicable.

In Merck KGaA v. Integra Lifesciences I, Ltd., 545 U.S. 193 (2005), the United States Supreme Court held that the use of patented compounds in preclinical studies is protected under 35 U.S.C §271(e)(1) if there is a reasonable basis to believe that the compound tested could be the subject of an FDA submission and if the experiments will produce the types of information relevant to an Investigational New Drug or New Drug Application.

In cases where the Supreme Court has ruled narrowly (e.g., pharmaceutical drugs only) and a lower court has ruled more broadly, further litigation in the lower courts will often be necessary before a subsequent case will resolve the issue more generally as a matter of settled case law.

== International framework ==
This type of exception is permitted by Article 30 of the WTO's TRIPs Agreement:

Members may provide limited exceptions to the exclusive rights conferred by a patent, provided that such exceptions do not unreasonably conflict with a normal exploitation of the patent and do not unreasonably prejudice the legitimate interests of the patent owner, taking account of the legitimate interests of third parties.

== See also ==
- Supplementary protection certificate (SPC)
- Test data exclusivity
