= List of United States Supreme Court cases, volume 342 =

This is a list of all of the United States Supreme Court cases from volume 342 of the United States Reports:

Case name	Citation	Date decided
Stack v. Boyle	342 U.S. 1	1951
Sutphen Estates, Inc. v. United States	342 U.S. 19	1951
McMahon v. United States	342 U.S. 25	1951
Gardner v. Panama R.R. Co.	342 U.S. 29	1951
Dixon v. Duffy	342 U.S. 33	1951
Palmer Oil Corp. v. Amerada Petroleum Corp.	342 U.S. 35	1951
United States v. Carignan	342 U.S. 36	1951
United States v. Jeffers	342 U.S. 48	1951
Gallegos v. Nebraska	342 U.S. 55	1951
Bindczyck v. Finucane	342 U.S. 76	1951
United States v. Wunderlich	342 U.S. 98	1951
Jennings v. Illinois	342 U.S. 104	1951
Stefanelli v. Minard	342 U.S. 117	1951
Cook v. Cook	342 U.S. 126	1951
Palmer v. Ashe	342 U.S. 134	1951
Lorain Journal Co. v. United States	342 U.S. 143	1951
United States v. Fortier	342 U.S. 160	1951
Ex parte Cogdell	342 U.S. 163	1951
Rochin v. California	342 U.S. 165	1952
Kerotest Mfg. Co. v. C-O-Two Fire Equipment Co.	342 U.S. 180	1952
Desper v. Starved Rock Ferry Co.	342 U.S. 187	1952
United States v. Kelly (1952)	342 U.S. 193	1952
Pillsbury v. United Engineering Co.	342 U.S. 197	1952
United States v. Hayman	342 U.S. 205	1952
United States v. Smith (1952)	342 U.S. 225	1952
Carson v. Roane-Anderson Co.	342 U.S. 232	1952
Longshoremen v. Juneau Spruce Corp.	342 U.S. 237	1952
Morissette v. United States	342 U.S. 246	1952
United States v. Halseth	342 U.S. 277	1952
Halcyon Lines v. Haenn Ship Ceiling & Refitting Corp.	342 U.S. 282	1952
United States v. Shannon	342 U.S. 288	1952
Georgia R.R. & Banking Co. v. Redwine	342 U.S. 299	1952
Guessefeldt v. McGrath	342 U.S. 308	1952
Cities Service Co. v. McGrath	342 U.S. 330	1952
Boyce Motor Lines, Inc. v. United States	342 U.S. 337	1952
United States ex rel. Jaegeler v. Carusi	342 U.S. 347	1952
Briggs v. Elliott	342 U.S. 350	1952
Hughes v. United States	342 U.S. 353	1952
Dice v. Akron C. & Y.R.R. Co.	342 U.S. 359	1952
United States v. New Wrinkle, Inc.	342 U.S. 371	1952
Standard Oil Co. v. Peck	342 U.S. 382	1952
Memphis Steam Laundry Cleaner, Inc. v. Stone	342 U.S. 389	1952
First Nat'l Bank v. United Air Lines, Inc.	342 U.S. 396	1952
Sutton v. Leib	342 U.S. 402	1952
Mullaney v. Anderson	342 U.S. 415	1952
Day-Brite Lighting, Inc. v. Missouri	342 U.S. 421	1952
Doremus v. Board of Educ.	342 U.S. 429	1952
Perkins v. Benguet Consol. Mining Co.	342 U.S. 437	1952
Brannan v. Stark	342 U.S. 451	1952
Adler v. Board of Educ.	342 U.S. 485	1952
Blackmar v. Guerre	342 U.S. 512	1952
Gray v. University of Tenn.	342 U.S. 517	1952
Frisbie v. Collins	342 U.S. 519	1952
Carlson v. Landon	342 U.S. 524	1952
Far E. Conference v. United States	342 U.S. 570	1952
Harisiades v. Shaughnessy	342 U.S. 580	1952
