= John W. Haussermann =

American colonial army officer

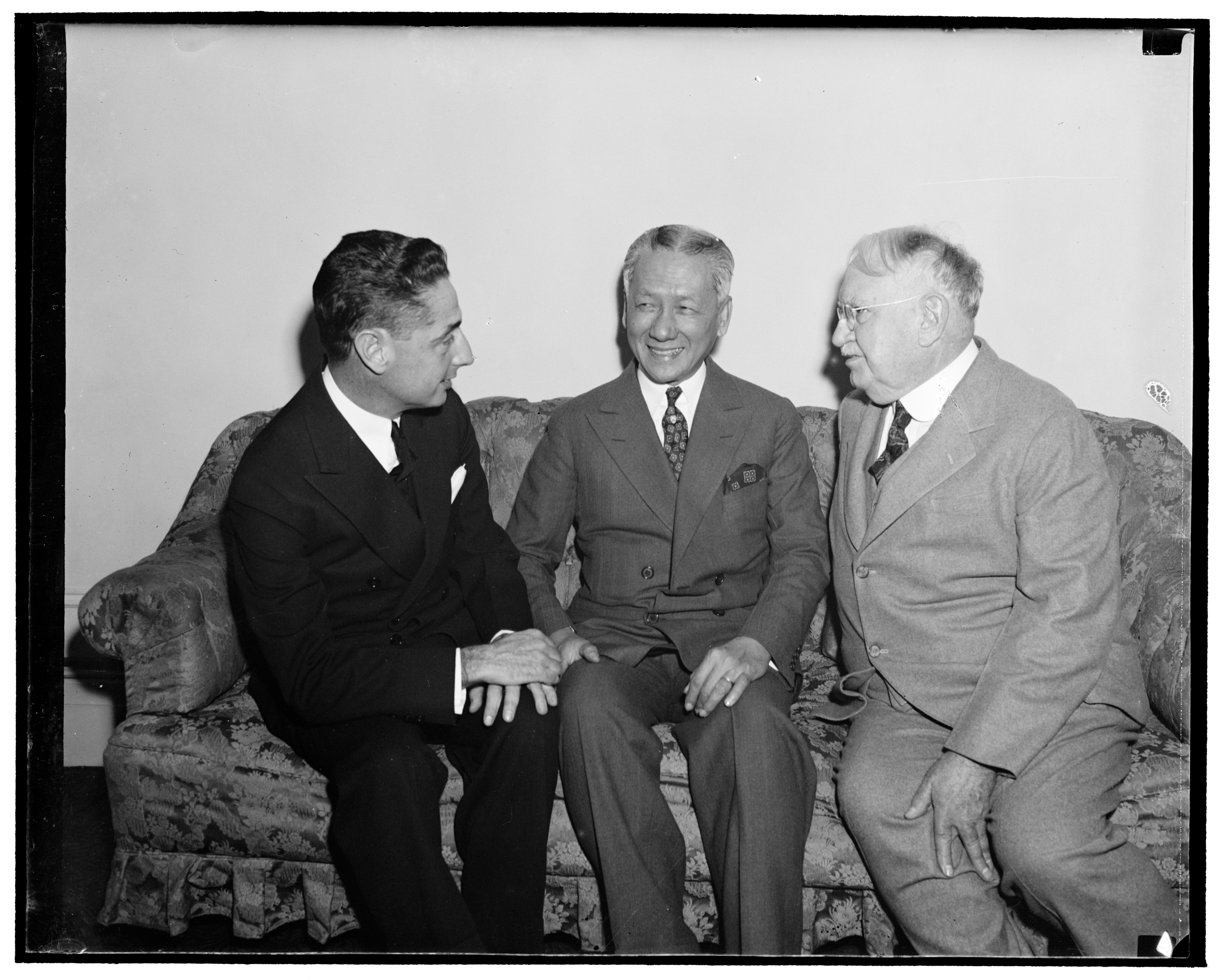
Joaquín Miguel Elizalde, Sergio Osmeña, and John W. Haussermann, 1938 or 1939

John W. Haussermann or "Judge" Haussermann (December 14, 1867 – July 11, 1965) was an American colonial army officer and gold mine owner in the Philippines. Haussermann was born in New Richmond, Ohio and came to the Philippines in 1898 as a second lieutenant during the Spanish–American War. After the war he remained in the Philippines and founded the gold mining company Benguet Mining Consolidated whose two largest gold mines (the Antamok Gulch and the Balatoc) supplied gold to the U.S. Department of Treasury. The company is estimated to have lost $13 million due to the Japanese occupation during World War II. Benguet Mining Consolidated was an important for its role as the defendant in the Perkins v. Benguet Mining Co. U.S. Supreme Court case of 1952.

He served as Judge Advocate and Assistant Attorney-General of the Philippines, the former under governor-general William Howard Taft.

After being forced to flee by the Japanese invasion, Mr. Haussermann began planning a trip back to the Philippines as early as October 1944. He was finally able to fulfil this plan in 1948.

His son, John William Haussermann Jr. (1909-1986) was born in Manila, and became a composer.

== Gallery ==
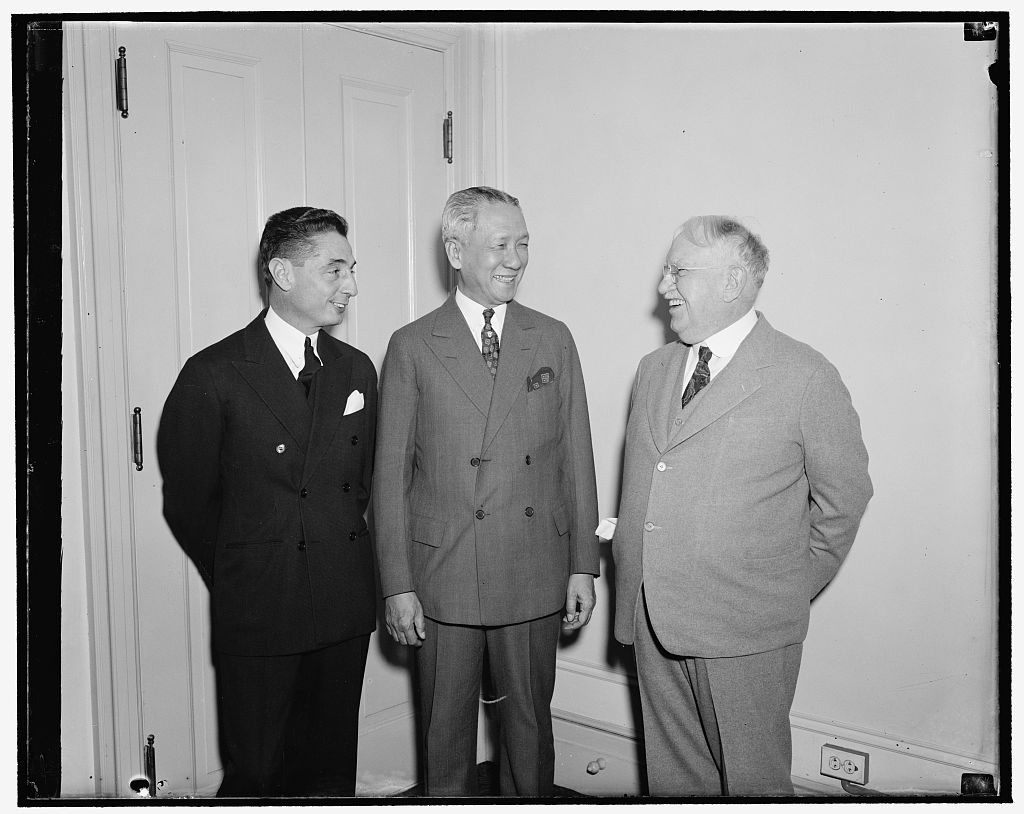
Haussermann in Washington (1938)
