= Perkins v. Benguet Mining Co. =

- Supreme Court of the United States

Argued November 27–28, 1951 Decided March 3, 1952
- Full case name: Perkins v. Benguet Consolidated Mining Co.
- Citations: 342 U.S. 437 (more) 72 S. Ct. 413; 96 L. Ed. 485; 1952 U.S. LEXIS 2386; 63 Ohio L. Abs. 146; 47 Ohio Op. 216

Case history
- Prior: 155 Ohio St. 116 (vacated and remanded)

Court membership
- Chief Justice Fred M. Vinson Associate Justices Hugo Black · Stanley F. Reed; Felix Frankfurter · William O. Douglas; Robert H. Jackson · Harold H. Burton; Tom C. Clark · Sherman Minton

Case opinions
- Majority: Burton, joined by Black, Reed, Frankfurter, Douglas, Jackson, Clark
- Dissent: Minton, joined by Vinson

Laws applied
- U.S. Const. amend. XIV

Perkins v. Benguet Mining Co., 342 U.S. 437 (1952), was a United States Supreme Court case which held that an Ohio state court could exercise general personal jurisdiction over a foreign corporation on the basis of that company's "continuous and systematic" contacts with the state of Ohio. Benguet Consolidated Mining Co. was a Philippine mining corporation, owned by American John W. Hausermann, that temporarily stopped its mining operations and relocated its president to Ohio during the World War II Japanese occupation of the Philippines. The Court held that the president's use of his office in Ohio to carry on continuous business activities during this period allowed Ohio to properly assert general jurisdiction over his company.

== Background ==
The Supreme Court case consolidated the two original suits into one. One suit had been brought by the petitioner Ms. Perkins for approximately $68,400 in dividends that she alleged were due her as a stockholder. The second suit was for $2,500,000 damages claimed as a result of the company's failure to issue to her certificates for 120,000 shares of its stock.

The trial court had sustained a motion to quash the summons in each case because the defendant was a foreign corporation and, as such, the Court did not have personal jurisdiction over it. Neither its corporate headquarters nor its principal place of business were in Ohio, and it had not applied for the required license to transact business in Ohio nor appointed an agent for service of process in state. Additionally, the claims Ms. Perkins sued upon did not arise from anything the defendant did in the state of Ohio. The Ohio State Supreme Court affirmed the decision and the plaintiff filed another appeal in the U.S. Supreme Court.

== Opinion of the Court ==
The Supreme Court reversed on the basis of the defendant president's "continuous and systematic supervision of the necessarily limited wartime activities of the company" in Ohio. It was thus not a violation of the Fourteenth Amendment due process clause for Ohio to assert general jurisdiction over the company on the plaintiff's claim, even though the claim arose from activities conducted outside the forum state and entirely distinct from those activities conducted inside the forum state.

The judgment of the Supreme Court of Ohio was vacated and the cause of action remanded for further proceedings consistent with the opinion.

This is a notable United States civil procedure case in the area of general jurisdiction. It represents one of the rare instances in which a state's exercise of general (as opposed to specific) personal jurisdiction over a non-resident was deemed to comport with the requirements of due process, due to the non-resident's extensive activities within the state.

== See also ==
- List of United States Supreme Court cases, volume 342
