= Niaz Fatehpuri =

Pakistani poet, writer, and polemicist (1884–1966)

Niaz Fatehpuri نیاز فتحپوری
- Born: Niaz Mohammed Khan; 1884; Nayi Ghat, Barabanki district
- Died: 24 May 1966 (aged 81–82); Karachi, Pakistan
- Education: Madrasa Islamia Fatehpur
- Occupation: Journalist
- Known for: Urdu poet, writer, polemicist
- Awards: Padma Bhushan (1962)

Niaz Fatehpuri (1884–1966; Urdu: نیاز فتح پوری) was the pen name of Niyaz Muhammed Khan, a Pakistani Urdu poet, writer, and polemicist. He was also the founder and editor of Nigar. In 1962, he was awarded the Padma Bhushan by the President of India for "Literature and Education."

== Biography ==
Niaz Fatehpuri was born in 1884 at Nayi Ghat, Barabanki district, in what is now Uttar Pradesh, during the British Raj. His real name was Mawlānā Niyaz Muhammad Khan. He was educated at Madrasa Islamia in Fatehpur, Madrasa Alia in Rampur, and Darul Uloom Nadwatul Ulama in Lucknow. He resigned his post in 1902 as a Police Sub-Inspector after working in this capacity for a couple of years. Thereafter, he worked in different posts until 1921, when he started editing and publishing his famous monthly journal, Nigar, which served as a mirror to the literary scene in Uttar Pradesh till his migration to Pakistan in the early sixties. He died in Karachi, Pakistan on 24 May 1966.

== Publications ==
His publications include:

- Man-o-Yazdan (on religion)
- Shahvaniyat (on sociology)
- Maktubat (his letters)
- Intiqadiyat (criticism)
- Jamalistan and Nigaristan (both short-stories) in 1939
- Shaair ka Anjam ("Fate of the Poet") in 1913
- Jazhabat-e-Bhasha (an appreciation of Hindi poetry), 2nd edn., in 1926
- Gahvara-e-Tamaddun (account of the role of women in the development of culture) in 1932
- Hindi Shaeri (on Hindi poetry) in 1936
- Targhibat-e-Jinsiya Sahvaniyat (on the development of sex knowledge) in 1941
- Husn ki Aiyariyan aur Dusre Afsane (short stories) in 1943
- Jhansi ki Rani in 1946
- Mukhtarat-i-Niyazi in 1947
- Naqab Uth Jane ke Bad in 1942
- Chand ghante hukmae qadim ki ruhon ke sath aur mazamin (three essays)
- Muttaleat-e-Niyaz (literary and historical essays) in 1947
- Taammulat-e-Niyaz (collection of articles), edited and published 1951;
- 3 volumes of his letters from 1948 to 1951
- Muzakirat-e-Niyaz (some pages of diary) in 1932
- Majmuah Istifsar va Javab (a collection of questions and answers on different topics) in 1938
- Sahabiyat (on some female followers of Muhammad) in 1932

== Literary activities ==
Niaz Fatehpuri was a fiction-writer of repute, whose Urdu short-stories, which are poems in prose, are considered to be on a par with those of Munshi Premchand and find a prominent place in Urdu literature. He was also an Urdu poet and critic, and a polemicist who dared to raise his voice against Fundamentalism.

Until he migrated to Pakistan in 1962, he had continued to publish and edit Nigar the Urdu monthly journal, which he had launched in 1921. This was originally published from Agra, then from Bhopal and subsequently from Lucknow. It is still published from Karachi by Farman Fatehpuri.

Niaz Fatehpuri wrote on Urdu literature, on religion and on the many evils affecting the social fabric of India in his time. He has more than two dozen major works to his credit. He was awarded the Padma Bhushan in 1962 for his services to Urdu.

== Analysis ==
In 1974, Malik Ram included him in his award-winning book of essays Woh Surten Ilahi (The Immortals) on nine unforgettable giants in the Urdu literary world.

In 1986, the Urdu Academy in Karachi published the book "Niaz Fatehpuri: Shakhsiyat aur Fikr–o–Fan" by Farman Fatehpuri on the life and literary works of Niaz Fatehpuri.

== Personal life ==
He is the father of Sarfaraz Niazi, who has translated Ghalib's poetry into English in two books titled Love Sonnets of Ghalib and The Wine of Passion, both published by Ferozsons, Lahore, Pakistan.
