= United States v. Wunderlich =

- Supreme Court of the United States

Argued November 6, 1951 Decided November 26, 1951
- Full case name: United States v. Wunderlich
- Citations: 342 U.S. 98 (more) 72 S. Ct. 154; 96 L. Ed. 113

Case history
- Prior: 117 Ct. Cl. 92 (reversed)

Court membership
- Chief Justice Fred M. Vinson Associate Justices Hugo Black · Stanley F. Reed; Felix Frankfurter · William O. Douglas; Robert H. Jackson · Harold H. Burton; Tom C. Clark · Sherman Minton

Case opinions
- Majority: Minton, joined by Vinson, Black, Frankfurter, Burton, Clark
- Dissent: Douglas, joined by Reed
- Dissent: Jackson

United States v. Wunderlich, 342 U.S. 98 (1951), was a case decided before the United States Supreme Court.

== Dispute ==
A dispute arose during the course of respondents' performance of a contract to build a dam for petitioner United States. The contract contained a dispute resolution provision, called a "finality clause" or an "Article 15" provision, which relegated disputes to the contracting officer with any final appeal to be rendered by the department head, whose decision was final and conclusive on the matter.

== Court of claims ==
The court of claims set aside the factual determination made by the Secretary of Interior, holding it to be arbitrary, capricious, and grossly erroneous, even if a provision of the contract made his decision final and conclusive upon the parties thereto.

== Opinion of the Court ==
In an opinion authored by Justice Minton, the Court reversed 6–3, holding:

- that the dispute resolution clause was valid and enforceable and that the administrative decision by the department head could be challenged only upon allegation and proof of fraudulent conduct, i. e., conscious wrongdoing with an intention to cheat or be dishonest.

- Gross mistake implying bad faith is equated to "fraud." Despite the fact that other words such as "negligence," "incompetence," "capriciousness," and "arbitrary" have been used in the course of its opinions, the court has consistently upheld the finality of a federal department head's decision unless it was founded on fraud, alleged and proved. So fraud is in essence the exception. By fraud the court means conscious wrongdoing, an intention to cheat or be dishonest.

- If the decision of a federal department head under Article 15 is to be set aside for fraud, fraud should be alleged and proved, as it is never presumed. However, in this instance, no incidents of fraud existed.

=== Dissents ===
Justice Douglas, with the concurrence of Justice Reed, dissented, arguing that the Court of Claims should be allowed to reverse an official where his conduct is plainly out of bounds, whether he is fraudulent, perverse, captious, incompetent, or just palpably wrong.

Justice Jackson, dissented on the ground that the administrative decision was impeachable not only for fraud, but also for a gross mistake necessarily implying bad faith.

== See also ==
- List of United States Supreme Court cases, volume 342
