= Reverse payment patent settlement =

Reverse payment patent settlements, also known as "pay-for-delay" agreements, are a type of agreement that has been used to settle pharmaceutical patent infringement litigation (or threatened litigation), in which the company that has brought the suit agrees to pay the company it sued. That is, the patent holder pays the alleged infringer to stop its alleged infringing activity (e.g., to stop selling a generic version of a drug) for some period of time and to stop disputing the validity of the patent. These agreements are distinct from most patent settlements, which usually involve the alleged infringer paying the patent holder.

== United States law ==
Reverse payment patent settlements result from a peculiarity in US regulatory law arising from the Hatch-Waxman Act passed in 1984. The law encourages patent infringement litigation with incentives outside the patent system. Under the Act, the first generic company to successfully challenge the patents of the innovative company, and that has its Abbreviated New Drug Application (ANDA) accepted by the FDA, is awarded with six months of exclusivity. During that time that FDA is not allowed to approve any other company's ANDA, and only the originator company and the winning generics company can market the drug. Because of the lack of competition, the price that the generic company can charge during this period is much higher than it eventually will be when other generic companies are allowed to sell the drug as well. In settling the litigation, the generics company can calculate the income it would get due to that 6 month administrative exclusivity, and the innovator can calculate the amount of money it would lose from sales to the generic company. The parties might agree that a cash payment from the innovator to the generic company is an arrangement in which both parties benefit more than they would if the litigation were to continue.

The settlements have been criticized as anti-competitive, thus violating United States antitrust law, and acting against the public interest, principally because they frustrate the purpose of the Hatch-Waxman Act. The Act was intended to increase competition and provide incentives to the entry of generic medications.

The first ruling by the US Supreme Court in relation to reverse payment settlements came in 2013, in which the Court ruled that the "Federal Trade Commission can sue pharmaceutical companies for potential antitrust violations" in the face of such settlements. Following that case, which involved Solvay Pharmaceutical's drug AndroGel and a reverse payment settlement between Solvay and Actavis, the number of academic papers about reverse payment patent settlement greatly increased. In 2019, Teva Pharmaceuticals was induced to pay the state of California $69 million to settle pay-for-delay claims; two other companies, Endo Pharmaceuticals and Teikoku Pharma, also settled for similar violations.

== European Union ==
On June 19, 2013, the European Commission imposed a fine of €93.8 million on H. Lundbeck A/S and fined several producers of generic pharmaceuticals a total of €52.2 million, after Lundbeck made agreements in 2002 with the other companies to delay marketing of less expensive generic versions of Lundbeck's citalopram. In return for the ability to maintain a monopoly on the drug's manufacture, Lundbeck offered payments and other kickbacks.
