= United States v. New Wrinkle, Inc. =

- Supreme Court of the United States

Argued January 10–11, 1952 Decided February 4, 1952
- Full case name: United States v. New Wrinkle, Inc.
- Citations: 342 U.S. 371 (more) 72 S.Ct. 350; 96 L. Ed. 417; 1952 U.S. LEXIS 2811; 92 U.S.P.Q. 158

Holding
- Patents give no protection from the prohibitions of the Sherman Act when the patent licensing agreements are used to restrain interstate commerce and fix prices of goods shipped in commerce.

Court membership
- Chief Justice Fred M. Vinson Associate Justices Hugo Black · Stanley F. Reed; Felix Frankfurter · William O. Douglas; Robert H. Jackson · Harold H. Burton; Tom C. Clark · Sherman Minton

Case opinions
- Majority: Reed, joined by Vinson, Black, Frankfurter, Douglas, Jackson, Burton, Minton
- Dissent: None
- Clark took no part in the consideration or decision of the case.

United States v. New Wrinkle, Inc., 342 U.S. 371 (1952), is a 1952 Supreme Court decision in which the Court held that a claim of conspiracy to fix uniform minimum prices and to eliminate competition throughout substantially all of the wrinkle finish industry of the United States by means of patent license agreements was, if proved, a violation of § 1 of the Sherman Act. That one of the defendants, a patent-holding company, abstained from manufacturing activities, did not ship goods in commerce, and engaged solely in patent licensing did not insulate its activity from § 1. Making these license contracts for the purpose of regulating distribution and fixing prices of commodities in interstate commerce is subject to the Sherman Act, even though the isolated act of contracting for the licenses occurs within a single state. Patents give no protection from the prohibitions of the Sherman Act when the patent licensing agreements are used to restrain interstate commerce and fix prices of goods shipped in commerce.

== Background ==
Before and during 1937, two paint companies, Kay & Ess and Chadeloid Chemical Co., were in patent litigation with each other. Each company claimed that it controlled the basic patents on wrinkle finish, and each company contended that the patents of the other could not be used without infringing its own patents. In November 1937 they decided to settle the litigation by forming a new, jointly–owned company, New Wrinkle, to which they assigned their patents. They agreed that they would license the wrinkle–finish industry to make and sell at fixed prices. Kay & Ess and Chadeloid then worked together to induce all manufacturers of wrinkle finish products to accept the price-fixing patent licenses from New Wrinkle. The prospective licensees were assured that the other manufacturers were being dealt with on the same basis "in order to establish minimum prices throughout the industry." By September 1938 the leading manufacturing companies and some 200 other manufacturers—substantially all manufacturers of wrinkle finishes in the United States—held nearly identical ten-year extendable license agreements from New Wrinkle, fixing prices. These license agreements required that a licensee observe in all sales of products covered by the licensed patents a schedule of minimum prices, discounts, and selling terms. Unlike its organizers, Kay & Ess and Chadeloid, New Wrinkle does not manufacture and sell the patented products. It just owns and licenses the patents.

The United States sued Kay & Ess, Chadeloid, and New Wrinkle in the United States District Court for the Southern District of Ohio, for conspiring to fix uniform minimum prices and to eliminate competition throughout the wrinkle–finish industry, in violation of § 1 of the Sherman Act. The defendants filed motions to dismiss, which the district court granted without issuing any opinion. The United States appealed to the Supreme Court.

== Ruling of the Supreme Court ==
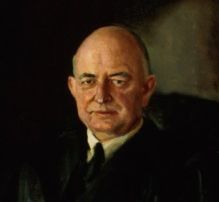
Justice Reed delivered the unanimous opinion of the Court

Justice Stanley Reed delivered the unanimous opinion of the Court.

Because New Wrinkle, unlike Kay & Ess and Chadeloid, did not manufacture or sell the patented products, and just owned and licensed the pooled patents, New Wrinkle contended that it is not engaged in trade or commerce—and thus could not be held liable for restraining trade and commerce under § 1 of the Sherman Act. "These contentions leave out of consideration," the Court responded, the allegations that "the use of patent licenses as an essential part of the plan to restrain trade, a trade in enamels, varnishes, and paints that is alleged to be and obviously is interstate in character." Pointing to the price-fixing provisions of the licenses, the Court said that it is "beyond question that this making of license contracts for the purpose of regulating distribution and fixing prices of commodities in interstate commerce is subject to the Sherman Act, even though the isolated act of contracting for the licenses is wholly within a single state."

New Wrinkle next argued that the doctrine of United States v. General Electric Co.—the 1926 GE case—immunized the price fixing from the antitrust laws. The Court distinguished the GE case from the case at bar: In the GE case, a patentee licensed a single other manufacturer to make and sell the patented product with a price limitation controlled by the patentee. In the present case, a patentee, acting in concert with all members of an industry, issued substantially identical licenses to all members of the industry under the terms of which the industry is completely regimented in order to organize the industry and stabilize prices. The Court said the case was indistinguishable from United States v. Line Material Co., and United States v. United States Gypsum Co., which held such conduct illegal.

== Subsequent developments ==
In Newburgh Moire Co. v. Superior Moire Co., the Third Circuit held that price-fixing clauses in multiple patent licenses violated the Sherman Act. Newburgh entered into licensing agreements with three of the five manufacturers in the moire finish industry, containing price-fixing clauses. The court held that the fact that there was more than one price-fixing license (in contrast to the single such license in the General Electric case) made the licenses fall outside the range of protected behavior that the General Electric case allowed. The Third Circuit explained:

At worst, we think that the patent laws were not intended to empower a patentee to grant a plurality of licenses, each containing provisions fixing the price at which the licensee might sell the product or process . . . and that, if a plurality of licenses are granted, such provisions therein are prohibited by the antitrust laws. The course pursued by Newburgh in the case at bar transcends the authority of the General Electric decision.

Despite the differences in the fact patterns (multiple licenses, pooling, cross-licensing), the court said it saw no difference between the General Electric and New Wrinkle cases, so that the latter must be regarded as overruling the former: "We can find no very strong basis for distinguishing between General Electric and New Wrinkle. The explanation probably lies more in history than in logic, for history is an untidy housekeeper."
