= Biologics Price Competition and Innovation Act of 2009 =

The Biologics Price Competition and Innovation Act of 2009 (BPCI Act) amends the Public Health Service Act (PHS Act) to create an abbreviated approval pathway for biological products shown to be biosimilar to, or interchangeable with, an FDA-licensed reference biological product. The BPCI Act is closely related to the Drug Price Competition and Patent Term Restoration Act of 1984 (or referred to as the "Hatch-Waxman Act"), which established abbreviated pathways for the approval of drug products under the Federal Food, Drug, and Cosmetic Act (FD&C Act).
