= Abbreviated New Drug Application =

Application for US generic drug approval

An Abbreviated New Drug Application (ANDA) is an application for a U.S. generic drug approval for an existing licensed medication or approved drug. A generic drug product is one that is comparable to a patented drug product in dosage form, strength, route of administration, quality, performance characteristics, and intended use.

Generic drug applications are termed "abbreviated" because (in comparison with a New Drug Application or the 505(b)(2) regulatory pathway for complex generic or biosimilar medications) they are generally not required to include preclinical studies (animal and in vitro) and human clinical trial data to establish safety and effectiveness. Instead, generic applicants must scientifically demonstrate that their product is bioequivalent (i.e., that it performs in the same manner as the innovator drug, principally as regards its active ingredient and pharmacokinetics).

One way scientists demonstrate bioequivalence is to measure the time it takes the generic drug to reach the bloodstream in 24 to 36 healthy volunteers. This gives them the rate of absorption, or bioavailability, of the generic drug, which they can then compare to that of the innovator drug. The generic version must deliver the same amount of active ingredients into a patient's bloodstream in the same amount of time as the innovator drug. In cases of topical medications, the bioequivalence of a drug can be demonstrated by comparing drugs dissolution or transdermal drug absorption is compared with the innovator drug. In cases of systemically active drugs, active drug blood concentration of that drug is compared with the innovator drug.

Using bioequivalence as the basis for approving generic copies of drug products was established by the Drug Price Competition and Patent Term Restoration Act of 1984, also known as the Hatch-Waxman Act. This Act expedites the availability of less costly generic drugs by permitting FDA to approve applications to market generic versions of brand-name drugs without conducting costly and duplicative clinical trials. At the same time, the brand-name companies can apply for up to five additional years longer patent protection for the new medicines they developed to make up for time lost while their products were going through FDA's approval process. Brand-name drugs are subject to the same bioequivalence tests as generics upon reformulation.

The ANDA is submitted to FDA's Center for Drug Evaluation and Research, Office of Generic Drugs, which provides for the review and ultimate approval of a generic drug product. Once approved, an applicant may manufacture and market the generic drug product to provide a safe, effective, low cost alternative to the American public.

Section IV of the Hatch-Waxman Act allows would-be producers of a generic version of a drug to challenge the brand-name drug’s patent(s) on the basis that is invalid or that their new generic would not infringe on it. The first generic drugmaker to make a successful Paragraph IV challenge is awarded the exclusive right to sell a generic version of the challenged drug for 180 days. This allows the challenger to sell its new generic only modestly less expensively than the brand-name drug and thus earn a substantial return. Some analysts argue that Section IV challenges suppress new drug innovation.

All approved products, both innovator and generic, are listed in FDA's Approved Drug Products with Therapeutic Equivalence Evaluations (Orange Book).
