= Approved drug =

Pharmaceutical product that successfully completed drug approval process

An approved drug is a medicinal preparation that has been validated for a therapeutic use by a ruling authority of a government. This process is usually specific by country, unless specified otherwise.

== Process by country ==
=== United States ===
In the United States, the FDA approves drugs. Before a drug can be prescribed, it must undergo the FDA's approval process. While a drug can feasibly be used off-label (for non-approved indications), it still is required to be approved for a specific disease or medical condition. Drug companies seeking to sell a drug in the United States must first test it. The company then sends the Food and Drug Administration's Center for Drug Evaluation and Research (CDER) evidence from these tests to prove the drug is safe and effective for its intended use. A fee is required to make such FDA submission. For financial year 2020, this fee was: for an application requiring clinical data ($2,942,965) and for an application not requiring clinical data ($1,471,483). A team of CDER physicians, statisticians, chemists, pharmacologists, and other scientists reviews the company's data and proposed labeling. If this independent and unbiased review establishes that a drug's health benefits outweigh its known risks, the drug is approved for sale. The center does not actually test drugs itself, although it does conduct limited research in the areas of drug quality, safety, and effectiveness standards.

As of the end of 2013, the FDA and its predecessors had approved 1,452 drugs, though not all are still available, and some have been withdrawn for safety reasons. Accounting for subsequent corporate acquisitions, these approvals were earned by approximately 100 different organizations.

=== European Union ===
In the European Union, it is the European Medicines Agency (EMA) that evaluates medicinal products.

=== Japan ===
In Japan, the agency regulating medicinal products is Pharmaceuticals and Medical Devices Agency (PMDA).

== Approval ==
On average, only one in every 5,000 compounds that makes it through lead development to the stage of preclinical development becomes an approved drug. Only 10% of all drugs started in human clinical trials become an approved drug.

== See also ==
- Drug discovery
- Drug design
- Drug development
- Abbreviated New Drug Application
- Patent medicine
