= Pegfilgrastim =

Monoclonal antibody

Clinical data
- Trade names: Neulasta
- Biosimilars: pegfilgrastim-apgf, pegfilgrastim-bmez, pegfilgrastim-cbqv, pegfilgrastim-fpgk, pegfilgrastim-jmdb, pegfilgrastim-pbbk, pegfilgrastim-pccg, pegfilgrastim-unne, Armlupeg, Cegfila, Filpegla, Dyrupeg, Ennumo, Fulphila, Fylnetra, Grasustek, Lapelga, Neutropeg, Niopeg, Nylaspeg, Nyvepria, Pelgraz, Pelmeg, Ristempa, Stimufend, Tezmota, Udenyca, Vivlipeg, Ziextenzo
- AHFS/Drugs.com: Monograph
- MedlinePlus: a607058
- License data: US DailyMed: Pegfilgrastim
- Pregnancy category: AU: B3
- Routes of administration: Subcutaneous
- Drug class: Hematopoietic agents, colony-stimulating factors, immunostimulants
- ATC code: L03AA13 (WHO)

Legal status
- Legal status: AU: S4 (Prescription only); CA: ℞-only / Schedule D; UK: POM (Prescription only); US: ℞-only; EU: Rx-only; In general: ℞ (Prescription only)

Pharmacokinetic data
- Elimination half-life: 15–80 hrs

Identifiers
- IUPAC name: N-(3-Hydroxypropyl)Methionylcolony-stimulating Factor (human), 1-Ether with .Alpha.-Methyl-.Omega.-Hydroxypoly(Oxyethylene)
- CAS Number: 208265-92-3
- IUPHAR/BPS: 6969
- DrugBank: DB00019
- ChemSpider: none
- UNII: 3A58010674
- KEGG: D06889
- ChEMBL: ChEMBL1201568
- ECHA InfoCard: 100.169.155

Chemical and physical data
- Formula: C_{845}H_{1343}N_{223}O_{243}S_{9}
- Molar mass: 18802.90 g·mol^{−1}

Pegfilgrastim, sold under the brand name Neulasta among others, is a PEGylated form of the recombinant human granulocyte colony-stimulating factor (GCSF) analog filgrastim. It serves to stimulate the production of white blood cells (neutrophils). Pegfilgrastim was developed by Amgen.

Pegfilgrastim treatment can be used to stimulate bone marrow to produce more neutrophils to fight infection in patients undergoing chemotherapy.

Pegfilgrastim has a human half-life of 15 to 80 hours, much longer than the parent filgrastim (3–4 hours).

Pegfilgrastim was approved for medical use in the United States in January 2002, in the European Union in August 2002, and in Australia in September 2002. It is on the World Health Organization's List of Essential Medicines.

== Medical uses ==
Pegfilgrastim is indicated to decrease the incidence of infection, as manifested by febrile neutropenia, in people with non-myeloid malignancies receiving myelosuppressive anti-cancer drugs associated with a clinically significant incidence of febrile neutropenia; and to increase survival in people acutely exposed to myelosuppressive doses of radiation (hematopoietic subsyndrome of acute radiation syndrome).

== Society and culture ==
=== Legal status ===
In January 2025, the Committee for Medicinal Products for Human Use CHMP of the European Medicines Agency adopted a positive opinion, recommending the granting of a marketing authorization for the medicinal product Dyrupeg, intended to shorten the duration of neutropenia and help prevent febrile neutropenia after cytotoxic chemotherapy. The applicant for this medicinal product is CuraTeQ Biologics s.r.o. Dyrupeg is a biosimilar medicinal product that is highly similar to the reference product Neulasta, which was authorized in the EU in August 2002. Dyrupeg was authorized for medical use in the European Union in March 2025.

In June 2025, the CHMP adopted a positive opinion, recommending the granting of a marketing authorization for the medicinal product Vivlipeg, intended to reduce the duration of neutropenia and the incidence of febrile neutropenia after cytotoxic chemotherapy. The applicant for this medicinal product is Biosimilar Collaborations Ireland Limited. Vivlipeg is a biosimilar medicinal product that is highly similar to Neulasta. Vivlipeg was authorized for medical use in the European Union in August 2025.

In July 2026, the CHMP adopted a positive opinion, recommending the granting of a marketing authorization for the medicinal product Cavoley, intended to reduce the duration of neutropenia and the incidence of febrile neutropenia after cytotoxic chemotherapy. The applicant for this medicinal product is CuraTeQ Biologics. Cavoley is a biosimilar medicinal product that is highly similar to the reference product Neulasta. Data show that Cavoley has comparable quality, safety and efficacy to Neulasta. Cavoley was authorized for medical use in the European Union in September 2026.
