= Test data exclusivity =

Test data exclusivity refers to protection of clinical trial data required to be submitted to a regulatory agency to prove safety and efficacy of a new drug, and prevention of generic drug manufacturers from relying on this data in their own applications. It provides a form of market exclusivity outside that provided by patent rights.

Pharmaceutical companies argue that since test data is so expensive to produce, it is an unfair advantage to let other companies rely on that data without cost. Critics charge that it can act as a restriction to producing a generic copy; that although it would not raise prices of drugs, it would prevent prices from falling due to generic competition; and make it more costly for the poor to gain access to life-saving drugs (e.g. anti-HIV & anti-malarial medications.) Developed countries with innovative pharmaceutical industries (including the United States) have sought data exclusivity provisions in Free Trade Agreements with their trading partners, e.g. DR-CAFTA which includes such a provision.

According to the European Commission:

""Data exclusivity" refers to the period during which the data of the original marketing authorisation holder relating to (pre-) clinical testing is protected. Accordingly, in relation to marketing authorisation applications submitted after 30 October 2005 for the applications filed in the framework of national procedures or 20 November 2005 for applications filed in the framework of the centralised procedure, 'data exclusivity' refers to the eight-year protection period during which generic applicant may not refer to the information of the original marketing authorisation holder and 'marketing exclusivity' refers to the ten-year period after which generic products can be placed on the market. However, in relation to marketing authorisation applications submitted before the above mentioned dates, the wording 'data exclusivity' refers to the six or ten-year protection period granted to the original marketing authorisation (MA) holder before generic applicants can file their applications for marketing authorisation."

One critical issue in this regard is the issue of data exclusivity for pioneer drug companies (pharmaceutical R&D organizations). From the standpoint of economics, industries where the R&D process is costly and risky need longer exclusivity periods to realize innovation benefits, compared to those industries where innovation is easier and less costly.

Some academics allege that pharmaceutical data exclusivity protection unfairly restricts the rapid public dispersal of knowledge that is supposed to be the trade-off for a grant of a patent or intellectual monopoly privilege. They allege that data exclusivity is really a form of evergreening pharmaceutical patent protection that may even restrict the capacity of governments to benefit from the granting of a compulsory license on the patents on a medicine, since the data monopoly will still prevent the marketing of generic products, even though the patent licenses have been granted by the government or a court.

A separate criticism of data exclusivity concerns medical and research ethics. Specifically, it is considered unethical under the Declaration of Helsinki to undertake duplicative clinical trials on human subjects. Similar concerns have been raised in the context of test data protection for certain agricultural or cosmetic products, leading in some countries to proposals for cost sharing rather than exclusive rights as the form of test data protection.

== Data exclusivity period for human-use drugs ==
- United States: 5 years for new pharmaceutical chemical entities, 3 years for new indications for pharmaceutical drugs, and 12 years for biologic products.
- European Union: 8 years (+ 2 years market exclusivity + 1 year for new indication)
- Japan: 6 years
- China: The government promised a protection period of 6 years for pharmaceutical drugs, when applying for membership to the World Trade Organization (WTO).
