= Biosimilar =

Variant of a biopharmaceutical

A biosimilar (also known as follow-on biologic or subsequent entry biologic) is a biologic medical product that is almost an identical copy of an original product that is manufactured by a different company. Biosimilars are officially approved versions of original "innovator" products and can be manufactured when the original product's patent expires. Reference to the innovator product is an integral component of the approval.

Unlike with generic drugs of the more common small-molecule type, biosimilar drugs generally exhibit high molecular complexity and may be quite sensitive to changes in manufacturing processes. Despite this heterogeneity, all biopharmaceuticals, including biosimilars, must maintain consistent quality and clinical performance throughout their lifecycle.

Drug-related authorities such as the European Medicines Agency (EMA) of the European Union, the United States Food and Drug Administration (FDA), and the Health Products and Food Branch of Health Canada hold their own guidance on requirements for demonstration of the similar nature of two biological products in terms of safety and efficacy. According to them, analytical studies demonstrate that the biological product is highly similar to the reference product, despite minor differences in clinically inactive components, animal studies (including the assessment of toxicity), and a clinical study or studies (including the assessment of immunogenicity and pharmacokinetics or pharmacodynamics). They are sufficient to demonstrate safety, purity, and potency in one or more appropriate conditions of use for which the reference product is licensed and is intended to be used and for which licensure is sought for the biological product.

The World Health Organization (WHO) published its "Guidelines for the evaluation of similar biotherapeutic products (SBPs)" in 2009. The purpose of this guideline is to provide an international norm for evaluating biosimilars.

The EMA has granted marketing authorizations for more than 50 biosimilars since 2006. The first biosimilar of a monoclonal antibody to be approved worldwide was a biosimilar of infliximab in the EU in 2013. On March 6, 2015, the FDA approved the United States' first biosimilar product, the biosimilar of filgrastim called filgrastim-sndz (trade name Zarxio) by Sandoz.

== Approval processes ==
=== United States ===
In the United States, the Food and Drug Administration (FDA) held that new legislation was required to enable them to approve biosimilars to those biologics originally approved through the PHS Act pathway. Additional Congressional hearings have been held. On March 17, 2009, the Pathway for Biosimilars Act was introduced in the House. Since 2004 the FDA has held a series of public meetings on biosimilars.

The FDA gained the authority to approve biosimilars (including interchangeables that are substitutable with their reference product) as part of the Biologics Price Competition and Innovation Act of 2009.

The FDA has previously approved biologic products using comparability, for example, Omnitrope in May 2006, but this like Enoxaparin was also to a reference product, Genotropin, originally approved as a biologic under the FD&C Act.

In March 2015, Zarxio obtained the first biosimilar approval from the FDA. Sandoz's Zarxio is biosimilar to Amgen's Neupogen (filgrastim), which was originally licensed in 1991. This is the first product to be passed under the Biologics Price Competition and Innovation Act of 2009 (BPCI Act), which was passed as part of the Affordable Healthcare Act. But Zarxio was approved as a biosimilar, not as an interchangeable product, the FDA notes. And under the BPCI Act, only a biologic that has been approved as an "interchangeable" may be substituted for the reference product without the intervention of the health care provider who prescribed the reference product. The FDA said its approval of Zarxio is based on review of evidence that included structural and functional characterization, animal study data, human pharmacokinetic and pharmacodynamics data, clinical immunogenicity data and other clinical safety and effectiveness data that demonstrates Zarxio is biosimilar to Neupogen.

In March 2020, most protein products that were approved as drug products (including every insulin currently on the market as of December 2019) are scheduled to open up to biosimilar and interchangeable competition in the United States. However, "chemically synthesized polypeptides" are excluded from this transition, which means that a product that falls within this category won't be able to come to market as a biosimilar or interchangeable product, but will have to come to the market under a different pathway.

== Background ==
Cloning of human genetic material and development of in vitro biological production systems has allowed the production of virtually any recombinant DNA based biological substance for eventual development of a drug. Monoclonal antibody technology combined with recombinant DNA technology has paved the way for tailor-made and targeted medicines. Gene- and cell-based therapies are emerging as new approaches.

Recombinant therapeutic proteins are of a complex nature (composed of a long chain of amino acids, modified amino acids, derivatized by sugar moieties, folded by complex mechanisms). These proteins are made in living cells (bacteria, yeast, animal or human cell lines). The ultimate characteristics of a drug containing a recombinant therapeutic protein are to a large part determined by the process through which they are produced: choice of the cell type, development of the genetically modified cell for production, production process, purification process, formulation of the therapeutic protein into a drug.

After the expiry of the patent of approved recombinant drugs (e.g., insulin, human growth hormone, interferons, erythropoietin, monoclonal antibodies and more) any other biotech company can develop and market these biologics (thus called biosimilars).

The typical reference product has undergone numerous changes in its manufacturing processes, and such changes in the manufacturing process (ranging from a change in the supplier of cell culture media to new purification methods or new manufacturing sites) was substantiated with appropriate data and was approved by the EMA.

The current concept of development of biosimilar monoclonal antibodies follows the principle that an extensive state of the art physicochemical, analytical and functional comparison of the molecules is complemented by comparative non-clinical and clinical data that establish equivalent efficacy and safety in a clinical "model" indication that is most sensitive to detect any minor differences (if these exist) between the biosimilar and its reference monoclonal antibody also at the clinical level.

The EMA has recognized this fact, which has resulted in the establishment of the term "biosimilar" in recognition that, whilst biosimilar products are similar to the original product, they are not exactly the same.

Originally the complexity of biological molecules led to requests for substantial efficacy and safety data for a biosimilar approval. This has been progressively replaced with a greater dependence on assays, from quality through to clinical, that show assay sensitivity sufficient to detect any significant difference in dose. However, the safe application of biologics depends on an informed and appropriate use by healthcare professionals and patients. Introduction of biosimilars also requires a specifically designed pharmacovigilance plan. It is difficult and costly to recreate biologics because the complex proteins are derived from living organisms that are genetically modified. In contrast, small molecule drugs made up of a chemically based compound can be easily replicated and are considerably less expensive to reproduce. In order to be released to the public, biosimilars must be shown to be as close to identical to the parent innovator biologic product based on data compiled through clinical, animal, analytical studies and conformational status.

Generally, once a drug is released in the market by the FDA, it has to be re-evaluated for its safety and efficacy once every six months for the first and second years. Afterward, re-evaluations are conducted yearly, and the result of the assessment should be reported to authorities such as FDA. Biosimilars are required to undergo pharmacovigilance (PVG) regulations as its reference product. Thus biosimilars approved by the EMA are required to submit a risk management plan (RMP) along with the marketing application and have to provide regular safety update reports after the product is in the market. The RMP includes the safety profile of the drug and proposes the prospective pharmacovigilance studies.

Several PK studies, such as studies conducted by Committee for Medicinal Products for Human Use (CHMP), have been conducted under various ranges of conditions; Antibodies from an originator's product versus antibodies from a biosimilar; combination therapy and monotherapy; various diseases, etc. on the purpose to verify comparability in pharmacokinetics of the biosimilar with the reference medicinal product in a sufficiently sensitive and homogeneous population.

== Nomenclature ==
In the European Union, no unique identifier of a biosimilar medicine product is required, as the same rules are followed as for all biologics.

The US decided on a different approach, requiring the assignment of a four-letter suffix to the nonproprietary name of the original product to distinguish between innovator drugs and their biosimilars. Japan has similar requirements. The suffix approach has been criticized on the grounds of compromising the INN system and delaying the marketing of biosimilars. Australia decided not to use a 4-letter suffix.

A version of the four-letter suffix has been proposed to the WHO as the biological qualifier (BQ). It is not part of the international nonproprietary name (INN), but is proposed to be managed under the same registry. The report 1 of the May 2017 WHO Expert Consultation on Improving Access to and Use of Similar Biotherapeutic Products, published in October 2017, revealed on page 4, that following the outcome arising from the meeting: "No consensus was reached on whether WHO should continue with the BQ... WHO will not be proceeding with this at present."

=== Bioparallel ===
Different from biosimilars, many new antibodies are being developed with the goal to be structurally different (to not violate patents) but functionally very similar to their reference drugs. Similarly, in advanced therapy medicinal products, such as Chimeric Antigen Receptor T-cell (CAR-T) therapy, the exchange of one component by a similar component (e.g. one promoter by another to drive CAR expression), generates structurally different, but functionally similar copies of drugs. There is no established term for such biologics, but the terms "bioparallels" or "me-too biologics" (in reference to me-too drugs) have been proposed. Within the current frameworks of the US and EU approval processes, these drugs require evaluation as new biological entities. Bioparallels compete with their reference medicines on price but have the advantage of being able to enter the market earlier.

=== Biobetter ===
The term biobetter refers to a biological drug that is an improved version of an existing biological drug. Unlike biosimilars, the term biobetter is used informally without any official and universally accepted definition. While biosimilars try to copy an existing biological drug (the "reference medicine") as closely as possible, biobetters try to improve on it. Since the term biobetter is informal, there is no rule which regulatory pathway they need to go through to be approved. When the improvement to the original drug is merely in the formulation (thus, e.g., adding additional modes of administration), the drug might be regulated as a biosimilar. However, if the active pharmaceutical ingredient (API) has been modified, the drug needs to be evaluated as a new biological entity. Even without changes to the API, the biobetter needs to be evaluated as a new biological entity (requiring a biologics license application), if it shows better clinical outcomes compared to the reference medicine. The latter happened e.g. to Zymfentra, an antibody biosimilar that can be given subcutaneously, whereas its reference medicine infliximab was only approved for intravenous administration.

== Australia ==
Biosimilars available in Australia include adalimumab, bevacizumab, enoxaparin, epoetin lambda, etanercept, filgrastim, follitropin alfa, infliximab, insulin aspart, insulin glargine, pegfilgrastim, rituximab, teriparatide, and trastuzumab.

== European Union ==
Biosimilar medicines approved in the European Union (EU) are interchangeable with their reference medicine or with an equivalent biosimilar.

European Union approved biosimilars
Active substance	Reference product	Biosimilar medicines
Adalimumab	Humira	Amgevita, Amsparity, Cyltezo, Halimatoz, Hefiya, Hukyndra, Hulio, Hyrimoz, Idacio, Imraldi, Kromeya, Libmyris, Solymbic, Trudexa, Yuflyma
Bevacizumab	Avastin	Abevmy, Alymsys, Aybintio, Equidacent, Mvasi, Onbevzi, Oyavas, Vegzelma, Zirabev
Enoxaparin sodium	Clexane	Inhixa, Thorinane
Epoetin alfa	Eprex/Erypo	Abseamed, Binocrit, Epoetin Alfa Hexal, Retacrit, Silapo
Etanercept	Enbrel	Benepali, Erelzi, Lifmior, Nepexto
Filgrastim	Neupogen	Accofil, Biograstim, Filgrastim Hexal, Filgrastim ratiopharm, Grastofil, Nivestim, Ratiograstim, Tevagrastim, Zarzio
Follitropin alfa	Gonal-F	Bemfola, Ovaleap
Infliximab	Remicade	Flixabi, Inflectra, Remsima, Zessly
Insulin aspart	NovoRapid	Fiasp, Insulin aspart Sanofi, Kirsty, NovoMix, Ryzodeg
Insulin glargine	Lantus	Abasaglar, Semglee
Insulin lispro	Humalog	Insulin lispro Sanofi
Pegfilgrastim	Neulasta	Cegfila, Fulphila, Grasustek, Pelgraz, Pelmeg, Udenyca, Stimufend, Ziextenzo
Ranibizumab	Lucentis	Byooviz, Ranivisio, Ximluci
Rituximab	MabThera	Blitzima, Ritemvia, Rituzena, Rixathon, Riximyo, Ruxience, Truxima
Somatropin	Genotropin	Omnitrope
Teriparatide	Forsteo	Movymia, Terrosa
Tocilizumab	RoActemra	Tyenne
Trastuzumab	Herceptin	Herzuma, Kanjinti, Ogivri, Ontruzant, Trazimera, Zercepac

== United States ==
As of October 2024, the US FDA has approved 60 biosimilars.

=== BPCI Act ===
The Biologics Price Competition and Innovation Act of 2009 (BPCI Act) is an amendment to the Public Health Service Act (PHS Act) to create an abbreviated approval pathway for biological products that are demonstrated to be highly similar (biosimilar) to a Food and Drug Administration (FDA) approved biological product. The BPCI Act is similar, conceptually, to the Drug Price Competition and Patent Term Restoration Act of 1984 (also referred to as the "Hatch-Waxman Act") which created biological drug approval through the Federal Food, Drug, and Cosmetic Act (FFD&C Act). The BPCI Act aligns with the FDA's longstanding policy of permitting appropriate reliance on what is already known about a drug, thereby saving time and resources and avoiding unnecessary duplication of human or animal testing. The FDA has released a total of four draft guidelines related to biosimilar or follow-on biologics development. Upon the release of the first three guidance documents the FDA held a public hearing on May 11, 2012.

In 2018, the FDA released a biosimilars action plan to implement regulations from the BPCI Act, including limiting the abuse of the risk evaluation and mitigation strategy (REMS) system for evergreening and transitioning insulin and human growth hormone to regulation as biologics rather than drugs.

=== US approved biosimilars ===
Date of Biosimilar FDA Approval	Biosimilar Product	Original Product
March 2015	filgrastim-sndz/Zarxio	filgrastim/Neupogen
April 2016	infliximab-dyyb/Inflectra	infliximab/Remicade
August 2016	etanercept-szzs/Erelzi	etanercept/Enbrel
September 2016	adalimumab-atto/Amjevita	adalimumab/Humira
April 2017	infliximab-abda/Renflexis	infliximab/Remicade
August 2017	adalimumab-adbm/Cyltezo	adalimumab/Humira
September 2017	bevacizumab-awwb/Mvasi	bevacizumab/Avastin
December 2017	trastuzumab-dkst/Ogivri	trastuzumab/Herceptin
December 2017	infliximab-qbtx/Ixifi	infliximab/Remicade
May 2018	epoetin alfa-epbx/Retacrit	epoetin alfa/Procrit
June 2018	pegfilgrastim-jmdb/Fulphila	pegfilgrastim/Neulasta
July 2018	filgrastim-aafi/Nivestym	filgrastim/Neupogen
October 2018	adalimumab-adaz/Hyrimoz	adalimumab/Humira
November 2018	pegfilgrastim-cbqv/Udenyca	pegfilgrastim/Neulasta
November 2018	rituximab-abbs/Truxima	rituximab/Rituxan
December 2018	trastuzumab-pkrb/Herzuma	trastuzumab/Herceptin
January 2019	trastuzumab-dttb/Ontruzant	trastuzumab/Herceptin
March 2019	trastuzumab-qyyp/Trazimera	trastuzumab/Herceptin
April 2019	etanercept-ykro/Eticovo	etanercept/Enbrel
June 2019	trastuzumab-anns/Kanjinti	trastuzumab/Herceptin
June 2019	bevacizumab-bvzr/Zirabev	bevacizumab/Avastin
July 2019	rituximab-pvvr/Ruxience	rituximab/Rituxan
July 2019	adalimumab-bwwd/Hadlima	adalimumab/Humira
November 2019	pegfilgrastim-bmez/Ziextenzo	pegfilgrastim/Neulasta
November 2019	adalimumab-afzb/Abrilada	adalimumab/Humira
December 2019	infliximab-axxq/Avsola	infliximab/Remicade
June 2020	pegfilgrastim-apgf/Nyvepria	pegfilgrastim/Neulasta
July 2020	adalimumab-fkjp/Hulio	adalimumab/Humira
December 2020	rituximab-arrx/Riabni	rituximab/Rituxan
July 2021	insulin glargine-yfgn/Semglee	insulin glargine/Lantus
September 2021	ranibizumab-nuna/Byooviz	ranibizumab/Lucentis
December 2021	insulin glargine-aglr/Rezvoglar	insulin glargine/Lantus
December 2021	adalimumab-aqvh/Yusimry	adalimumab/Humira
February 2022	filgrastim-ayow/Releuko	filgrastim/Neupogen
April 2022	bevacizumab-maly/Alymsys	bevacizumab/Avastin
May 2022	pegfilgrastim-pbbk/Fylnetra	pegfilgrastim/Neulasta
August 2022	ranibizumab-eqrn/Cimerli	ranibizumab/Lucentis
September 2022	pegfilgrastim-fpgk/Stimufend	pegfilgrastim/Neulasta
September 2022	bevacizumab-adcd/Vegzelma	bevacizumab/Avastin
December 2022	adalimumab-aacf/Idacio	adalimumab/Humira
May 2023	adalimumab-aaty/Yuflyma	adalimumab/Humira
August 2023	natalizumab-sztn/Tyruko	natalizumab/Tysabri
September 2023	tocilizumab-bavi/Tofidence	tocilizumab/Actemra
October 2023	ustekinumab-auub/Wezlana	ustekinumab/Stelara
December 2023	bevacizumab-tnjn/Avzivi	bevacizumab/Avastin
February 2024	adalimumab-ryvk/Simlandi	adalimumab/Humira
March 2024	denosumab-bbdz/Jubbonti	denosumab/Prolia
March 2024	denosumab-bbdz/Wyost	denosumab/Xgeva
March 2024	tocilizumab-aazg/Tyenne	tocilizumab/Actemra
April 2024	ustekinumab-aekn/Selarsdi	ustekinumab/Stelara
April 2024	trastuzumab-strf/Hercessi	trastuzumab/Herceptin
May 2024	aflibercept-yszy/Opuviz	aflibercept/Eylea
May 2024	aflibercept-jbvf/Yesafili	aflibercept/Eylea
May 2024	eculizumab-aeeb/Bkemv	eculizumab/Soliris
June 2024	ustekinumab-ttwe/Pyzchiva	ustekinumab/Stelara
June 2024	filgrastim-txid/Nypozi	filgrastim/Neupogen
June 2024	aflibercept-mrbb/Ahzantive	aflibercept/Eylea
July 2024	eculizumab-aagh/Epysqli	eculizumab/Soliris
August 2024	aflibercept-abzv/Enzeevu	aflibercept/Eylea
August 2024	aflibercept-ayyh/Pavblu	aflibercept/Eylea
September 2024	ustekinumab-aauz/Otulfi	ustekinumab/Stelara
October 2024	ustekinumab-srlf/Imuldosa	ustekinumab/Stelara
November 2024	ustekinumab-kfce/Yesintek	ustekinumab/Stelara
December 2024	Ustekinumab-stba/Steqeyma	ustekinumab/Stelara
January 2025	tocilizumab-anoh/Avtozma	tocilizumab/Actemra
February 2025	denosumab-dssb/Ospomyv	denosumab/Prolia
February 2025	denosumab-dssb/Xbryk	denosumab/Xgeva
February 2025	insulin aspart-szjj/Merilog	insulin aspart/Novolog
February 2025	denosumab-bmwo/Osenvelt	denosumab/Xgeva
February 2025	denosumab-bmwo/Stoboclo	denosumab/Prolia
March 2025	omalizumab-igec/Omlyclo	omalizumab/Xolair
March 2025	denosumab-bnht/Bomyntra	denosumab/Xgeva
March 2025	denosumab-bnht/Conexxence	denosumab/Prolia
April 2025	bevacizumab-nwgd/Jobevne	bevacizumab/Avastin
May 2025	ustekinumab-hmny/Starjemza	ustekinumab/Stelara
July 2025	insulin aspart-xjhz/Kirsty	insulin aspart/Novolog
August 2025	denosumab-nxxp/Bildyos	denosumab/Prolia
August 2025	denosumab-nxxp/Bilprevda	denosumab/Xgeva
September 2025	denosumab-kyqq/Aukelso	denosumab/Xgeva
September 2025	denosumab-kyqq/Bosaya	denosumab/Prolia
September 2025	denosumab-qbde/Enoby	denosumab/Prolia
September 2025	denosumab-qbde/Xtrenbo	denosumab/Xgeva
October 2025	aflibercept-boav/Eydenzelt	aflibercept/Eylea
October 2025	denosumab-desu/Jubereq	denosumab/Xgeva
October 2025	denosumab-desu/Osvyrti	denosumab/Prolia
November 2025	pertuzumab-dpzb/Poherdy	pertuzumab/Perjeta
November 2025	pegfilgrastim-unne/Armlupeg	pegfilgrastim/Neulasta
December 2025	ranibizumab-leyk/Nufymco	ranibizumab/Lucentis
December 2025	denosumab-mobz/Boncresa	denosumab/Prolia
December 2025	denosumab-mobz/Oziltus	denosumab/Xgeva
