= Proprietary drug =

Pharmaceutical drugs with patent protections

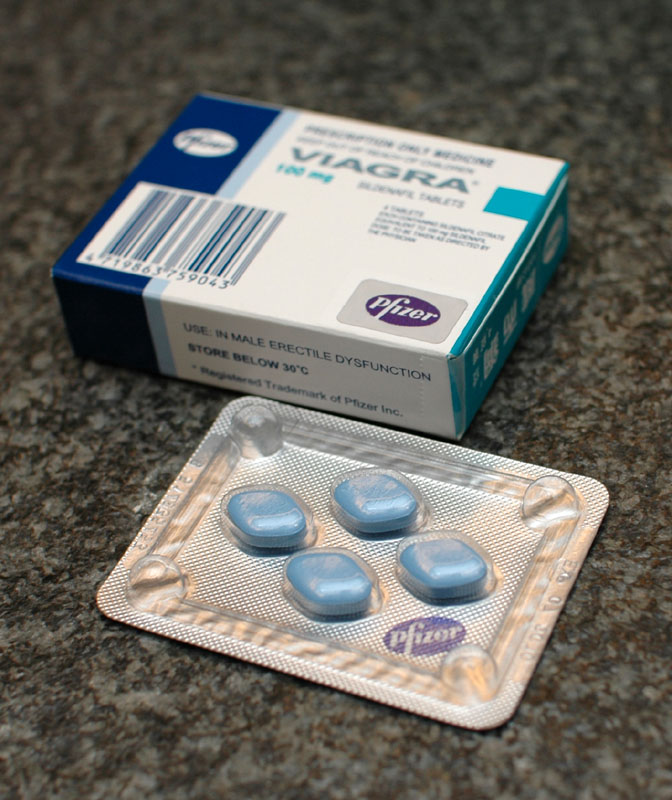
Viagra (sildenafil) is a famous example of proprietary drug, owned by Pfizer.

Proprietary drugs are chemicals used for medicinal purposes which are formulated or manufactured under a name protected from competition through trademark or patent. The invented drug is usually still considered proprietary even if the patent expired. When a patent expires, generic drugs may be developed and released legally. Some international and national governmental organizations have set up laws to enforce intellectual property to protect proprietary drugs, but some also highlight the importance of public health disregarding legal regulations. Proprietary drugs affect the world in various aspects including medicine, public health and economy.

Not all proprietary drugs have their generic replacements available. Biologics are often produced by in vivo preparation and direct extraction of substances from living organisms. Pharma is not extensively involved in searching for ready-to-sell generic biologics due to the complexity of manufacture and hurdles in extraction processes. Besides vaccines, these endogenous origin chemicals are prescribed to patients with severe conditions, such as complications including asthma, rheumatoid arthritis, or cancer. Patients taking a particular brand of biologics are unable to interchange between one and another to prevent underlying exposure to more side effects and/or suboptimal treatment. It is believed that generic biopharmaceutical products will not be released in the near future until all technical difficulties are overcome.

== Terminology ==
=== Brand-name drugs ===
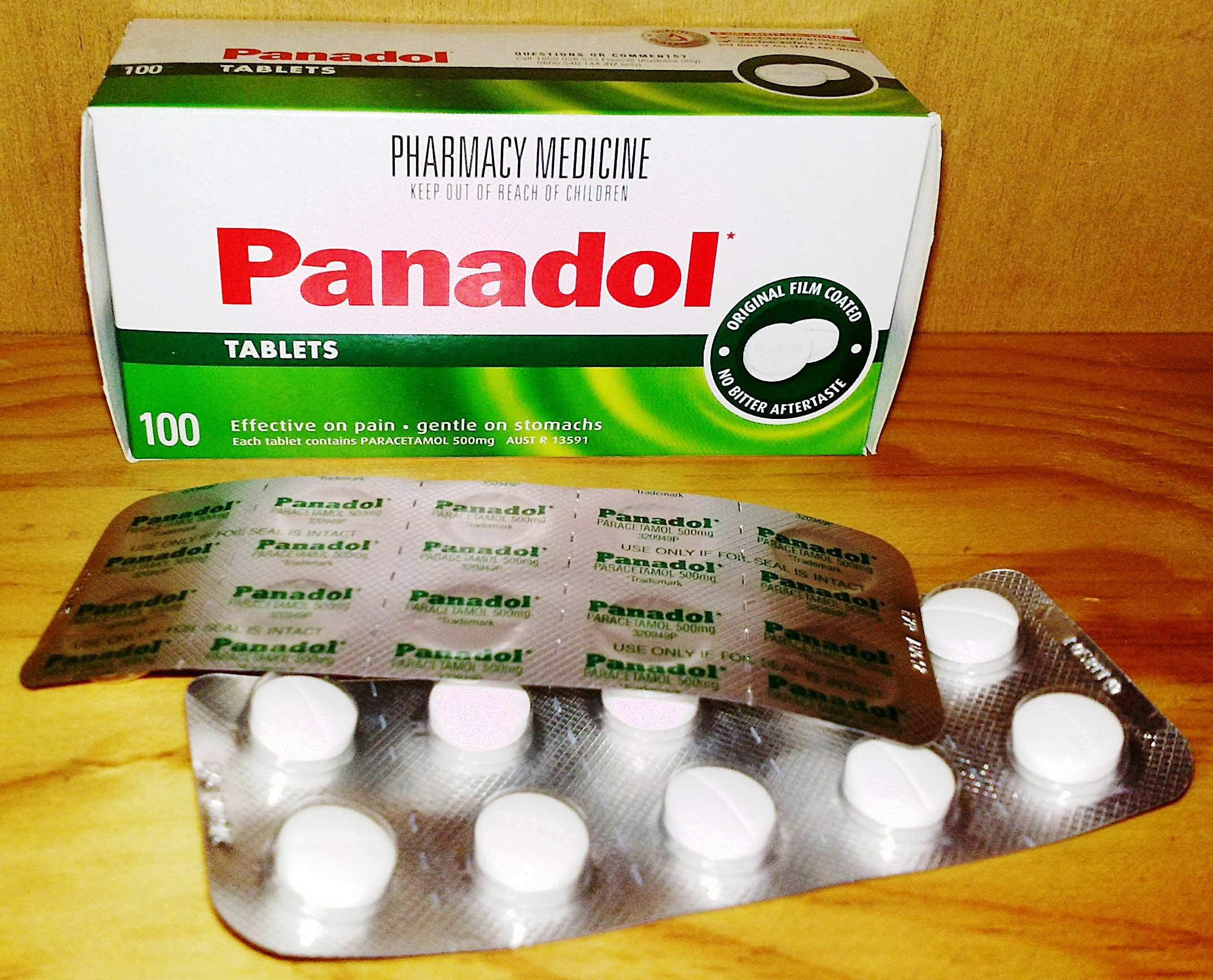
Panadol, one of the branded version of paracetamol

Brand-name drugs are broadly defined as drugs that are marketed under trade names and have patents, which can be a synonym of proprietary drugs in daily use. Strictly speaking, every drug with a trade name is a brand name drug, such as Panadol, a GSK branded paracetamol.

=== Generic drugs ===
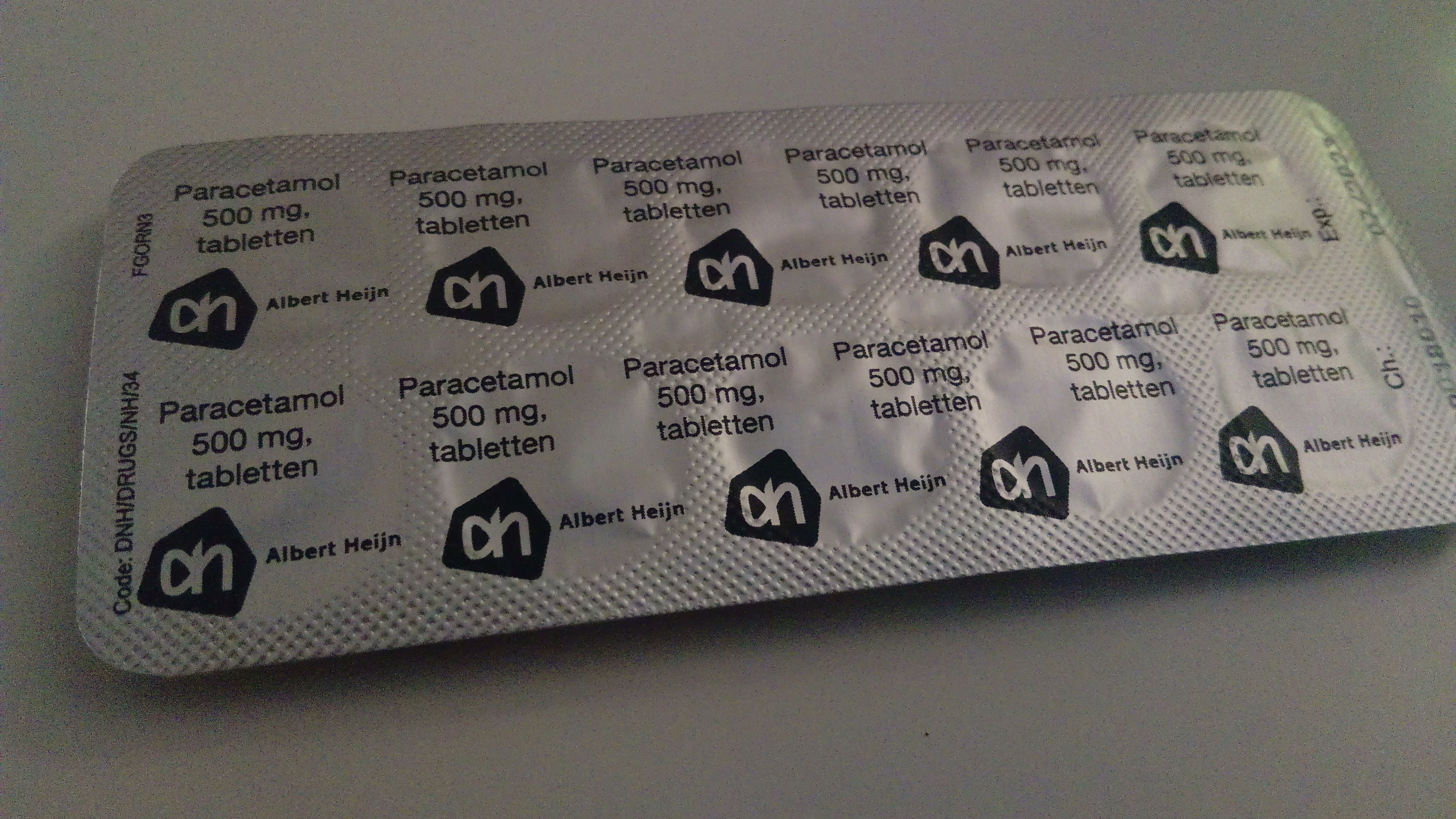
Generic form of paracetamol

Generic drugs are drugs that have the same active ingredient with a patent-expired drug, and are virtually bio-equivalent. The official names are often used to market these drugs, which are called unbranded generic drug, such as Panamax, a generic form of paracetamol.

=== Off-patent drugs ===
A term specifically used to describe past proprietary drugs by referring to their off-patent status.

== Regulations ==
To support scientific investigation and protect intellectual properties, patents are granted to companies and individuals who invented the drug. Most entities in the world have established corresponding agendas legally. Global and regional governmental organizations have various extents of advancements and approaches in their intellectual property rights protection laws. Below are some examples for comparison:

=== World Trade Organization (WTO) ===
==== TRIPS Agreement ====
The Agreement on Trade-Related Aspects of Intellectual Property Rights (TRIPS Agreement) set up in 1994 suggested a standard on Intellectual Property Rights, which proprietary drug, a type of pharmaceutical and scientific inventions, is covered in this agreement. Basic principles such as the minimal duration of patent and part of the exclusive rights of patent owners are included by WTO member states in their respective national regulations. By 5 years and 10 years after the effectiveness of TRIPS Agreement, developed countries and developing countries were required to comply with it.

==== Doha Declaration ====
Trying to alleviate worldwide divide in accessibility of medical resources, members from the WTO endorsed the Doha Declaration on the TRIPS Agreement and Public Health in 2001. The basics of this Declaration is that "the TRIPS Agreement does not and should not prevent Members from taking measures to protect public health". It legalized the participating members to ignore the restriction from the patent of the proprietary medicine when they are controlling a significant public health crisis, namely human immunodeficiency virus (HIV), malaria and tuberculosis. Thus, affordable generic medicine can be provided for the populations in the developing countries in emergency situations.

=== United States ===
In the United States, proprietary drugs are associated with two status: patent and exclusivity. Patent is managed by the United States Patent and Trademark Office, granting inventors of new drugs rights for 20 years. It is open to all drugs, regardless of its research or commercialization status. To enjoy the benefits brought by patenting, pharmaceutical companies are obliged to disclose all research data on that drug to the public for further progression. Exclusivity, given by the U.S. Food and Drug Association (FDA), means a period of time in which no other competitor drugs can be approved. Commercialized and clinically used drugs are the targets of exclusivity. The length of exclusivity depends on the nature of application, and ranges from one to seven years. Practically exclusivity is granted for proprietary drugs that have been granted with patents, but it is not mandatory. Legalwise, generic counterparts have to wait for at least 2 decades for patent expiration to sell a copy . This system is said to aim for a balance between gaining public access to generic drugs and encouraging drug research and development.

==== Litigation ====
Despite the US having a legal system regarding to drug patenting, litigation have taken place. In the past, it is common for drug manufacturers challenging the validity of patents. In 2018, Mylan attempted to revoke the patent of Symbicort owned by AstraZeneca through the court. Now pharma suing on deliberately infringing generic drugs has become more prominent. AstraZeneca then took follow-up actions against Mylan for premature submission of Abbreviated New Drug Application (ANDA) for generic Symbicort and won the lawsuit. The introduction of biopharmaceuticals and the subsequent establishment of new drug laws may also bring more litigation.

=== India ===
According to the Patent Law in India, drug can apply for a patent since 2005. Registering a drug for patents in India is more limiting than developed countries. India was removed from the least developed member states list of the WTO and is therefore no longer eligible for the waiver, it has modified its patent law to satisfy TRIPS Agreement with its intellectual property rights legal system. An Indian patent lasts for 20 years. To ensure the interest of public, a compulsory license can be issued by the government if a pharma is suspected for violating the public health principles.

==== Litigation ====
Introducing new drug patenting regulations after 35 years could possibly lead to today's disputes, such as the Novartis v. Union of India incident. Generic Gleevec, a formulation that can substitute Glivec, were distributed in the local market since 1993. Novartis had filed a patent for Glivec in 1997. An exclusive marketing right was also granted for Novartis in 2003 and the application were approved in 2005 . In 2013, the Supreme Court of India upheld the rejection of the patent application of Glivec by Novartis, ending the 10-years battle between the proprietary drug tycoon and the local patent law. Since 1993, Novartis has started to register patent for Glivec and its active ingredients worldwide without defeats. However, the Supreme Court of India rejected the patent registration of Glivec on 2006 according to the interpretations on the patent law and TRIPS agreement by the Court. By then, the local generic drugs in India are protected. This incident is referred as a challenge to the intellectual property laws.

== Patent cliff ==
Patent cliff refers to a dramatic dip in the revenue of a merchandise upon patent expiry. It is a prominent phenomenon in the proprietary drug industry due to the vast gap of prices between the proprietary drug and the generic drug. Since 2010, numerous pharmaceutical board busters have started to become off-patent. As seen in the figure below, the top five off-patent proprietary drug before 2017 have a combined lifetime sale of around US$588.4 Billion, which is enormous enough to surpass the bottom 5% countries' GDP in 2020.

Figure 1: Five best-selling proprietary drug which lost their patents before 2017
Expired proprietary drug	Expiry year	Worldwide total lifetime sale (Billion US dollars)
Humira	2016	179.4
Lipitor	2011	149.4
Advair	2016	108.3
Lantus	2015	81.8
Nexium	2015	69.5

Proprietary drug is a substantial business protected by its respective patent. They are usually sold at a higher price, to compensate for the clinical trial cost and sometimes for the manufacturing of new technology. For example, an widely used average proprietary drug is 18 times more expensive than a common generic drug. Lyrica, a recent off-patent painkiller for nervous systems, had a sale of 5B USD in 2019, out of the 51.8B USD annual sale of the corresponding company.

However, once the proprietary drug become off-patent, there will soon be immense competition from the generic drugs produced by their business rivals. As cheaper pharmaceutical alternatives are launched, the surge in supply disrupts the market supply-and-demand status. The declining dependence on the original proprietary drug will cause its sales decreases. On top of that, the original company usually will have their prices tuned down for improving competitiveness. Resulting in a significant drop of revenue of the proprietary drug.

The graph below shows the yearly revenue of Lipitor, a proprietary drug which lost its patent on 2011. As it can be seen, a significant patent cliff happened from 2011 to 2012(58.8% drop in yearly revenue) and it is very possibly due to its newly off-patent status.

Figure 2: The yearly revenue of Lipitor by Pfizer (million US dollars) from 2004 to 2019

== Benefits ==
=== Promoting influx of income to pharmaceutical research industry ===
Proprietary drug market is protected by its patent. As a result, its market exclusivity basis allows proprietary drugs to be highly profitable and commercially successful. Usually, pharmaceutical research is a lengthy, highly demanding, rarely successful, costly and risky investment. It is usually associated with a disinterested merchandise in the economic world. However, once a successful experimental drug candidate is registered as a proprietary drug product, the patent legally ensures a long-term dominance in the exclusive market which is free of imitative generic drug. Generating a stable and considerable net income to cover the cost.

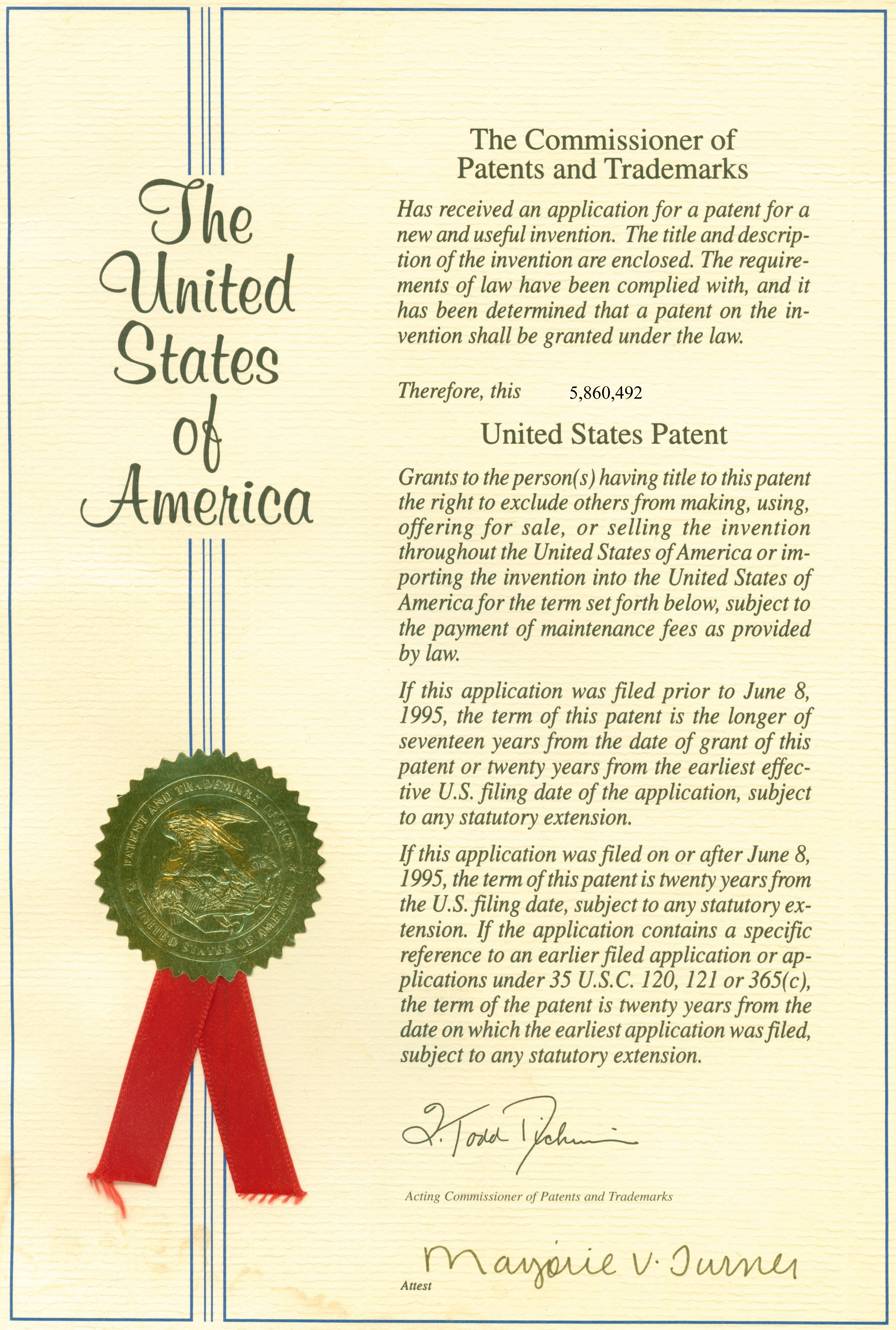
Patent of the proprietary drug can only be granted after careful approval on its patent registration application.

The money earned by the drug can fund future medical research. Providing more resources and manpower to the research and development of another drug candidates. As well as attracting new investments to the pharmaceutical research industry due to its exclusive market potential. They encourage efforts on biopharmaceutical innovations and newborn medical breakthroughs.

=== Guiding future medical progresses by referencing of product knowledge ===
Being required for successful patent registration, detailed pharmaceutical formulations of the proprietary drug are disclosed on its patent registration application, which promote the spillover of research efforts among the medical world. In order to inspect the safety and efficacy of the proprietary drug candidate, pharmaceutical companies need to list all clinical trial data and formulation method as detailed as possible to prove the drug candidate's validity to the patent registration committee. Once the patent is rewarded, these data will later be published on medical literature and public domains as common knowledge.

Researchers can capitalise on the previous successes and establish their own project on top of the current statistics. These cooperatively help exploit more unknown drug candidates without repeating previous progresses. Speeding up future medical advancements.

== Criticisms ==
=== Hindering of equitable access to medicine ===
According to World Health Organisation(WHO), equitable access to medicines refers to an affordable and reasonable ability for patients to get their required drug to achieve health. WHO member states shall fulfill their moral responsibility to improve the delivery of and access to the needed drugs.

However, the monopolisation of some expensive proprietary drug in the market is hindering poor patients' access to their best available medications. Leading to suboptimal treatments of diseases and lowering of health standard of these patients. This phenomenon is very prominent in the underdeveloped countries which usually have a large proportion of underprivileged citizens.

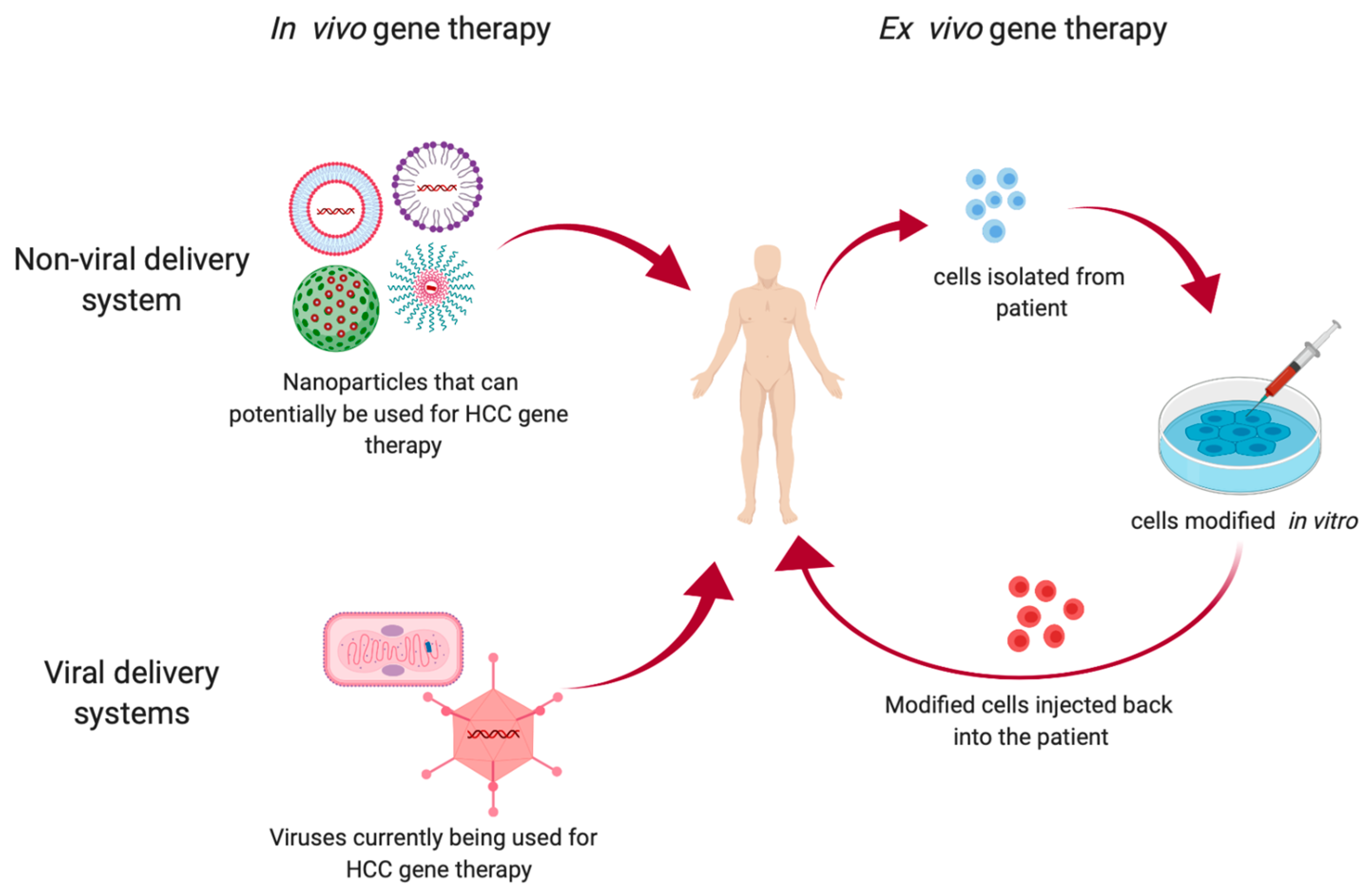
State-of-the-art proprietary drugs for gene therapy occupy top rankings in the expensive drug list due to their complex mechanism but superior efficacy in rare disease.

Some proprietary drugs(mainly speciality proprietary drug) are criticised for their price-gouging commercial tactics. To illustrate, the world's most expensive drug, Zolgensma, costs over US$2.1 million per year of treatment, which are generally considered as unaffordable. Since Zolgensma is the only approved drug for curing Spinal Muscular Atrophy in childhood, patients who cannot afford Zolgensma will be physically disabled for the rest of their lives. Creating inequity among patients with varying financial capacitances.

=== Abusing of patent extension system ===
According to the TRIPS Agreement, the term of patent of the proprietary drug usually can last for 20 years counting from the filing date. After that, approved generic drugs can enter the market legally with fair competition.

However, in order to achieve longer dominance in the market, pharmaceutical manufacturer (especially big pharma) may apply for patent extension or even new patent registration based on various reasons. Including modifying the formulations, dosage form or maneuvering legal system. To illustrate, AbbVie, a pharmaceutical tycoon, had attempted 247 proprietary drug patent extension applications for extending their exclusivity for 39 years in the USA on 2018 alone. Among them, 137 applications were successful in extending the patent.

The abusing of patent extension system leads to a much longer terms of patent than that stated in both local regulations and TRIPS Agreement. Providing a long period of competition-free market to their proprietary drug. It creates an unfair competition environment in the pharmaceutical market. Since the generic drug companies are excluded from that particular market, they cannot release new pharmaceutical products for public use on the same field. Resulting enduring monopolisation of proprietary drug market by the big pharma which are already stockpiling proprietary drug.

== See also ==
- Doha Declaration
- Medicines Patent Pool
- Generic drug
- Generic brand
- Intellectual property
- Novartis v. Union of India & Others incident
- Patent
- Patent Cliff
- Pharmaceutical Industry
- Trademark
- TRIPS agreement
