= T. R. Andhyarujina =

Indian Senior Advocate

T R Andhyarujina
- Born: Tehmtan Rustomji Andhyarujina; 17 November 1933; Bombay Presidency, British India
- Died: 28 March 2017 (aged 83)
- Occupation: Lawyer
- Years active: 1955–2017
- Spouse: Siloo Andhyarujina

Tehmtan R. Andhyarujina (17 November 1933 – 28 March 2017) was an Indian lawyer and jurist. He was a designated senior advocate and practised at the Supreme Court of India.

He was the Solicitor General of India from 1996 to 1998. Prior to that he was the Advocate-General of Maharashtra from 1993 to 1995. He specialized in the field of constitutional law, human rights, public law and commercial law. He is widely remembered for his expertise in a branch of constitutional law relating to parliamentary privileges.

== Education ==
Born to a Parsi family, Andhyarujina was a student of Bombay Scottish School, Mahim and the Government Law College, Mumbai, between 1955 and 1957. He was awarded the Sir Charles Sergeant Scholarship and the Vishnu Dhurander Gold medal in law by the Bombay University. He was selected for the Indian Foreign Service in 1958 but opted to practise law.

== Career ==
Andhyarujina was a counsel in the chamber of H M Seervai, the then Advocate-General of erstwhile Bombay state from 1958 to 1974 and appeared for the State of Maharashtra in the Bombay High Court and the Supreme Court of India alongside him. Before joining the Bar, Andhyarujina was selected for the Indian Foreign Service in 1958. He secured 3rd rank in the ICSE (now UPSC) examination. Some of the important cases in which he has appeared in the Supreme Court are: Kesavananda Bharati v. The State of Kerala case, The Parliamentary Privileges Case (In Re: Keshav Singh), Sexual Harassment of Women case (Vishakha v. State of Rajasthan), the Narmada, Cauvery and Krishna River Water Disputes Cases, the Legislative Assemblies Dissolution case (S. R. Bommai v. Union of India), Hindustan Lever and Tomco Merger case, JMM Bribery case (P.V. Narasimha Rao v. State), Raja Ram Pal vs. Hon'ble Speaker (Cash for Query:expulsion of MPs by Parliament), I.R. Coelho vs. State of Tamil Nadu (Constitutional validity of the IXth Schedule to the Constitution), Ashoka Kumar Thakur v. Union of India, Glanrock Estate v. State of Tamil Nadu, Aruna Shanbaug v. Union of India (the recent case that permitted passive euthanasia in India), and Novartis v. Union of India & Others (concerning evergreening of patents).

He was the Chairman of the Committee on Banking Laws (Andhyarujina Committee) appointed by the Government of India in 1998 which led to the passing of the Securitisation and Reconstruction of Financial Assets & Enforcement of Security Interest Act, 2002 (SARFAESI Act). He was a member of the Task Force on the Committee on Centre–State Relations Review appointed by the Government of India in 2007.

He was a part-time Professor in Constitutional Law in the University of Bombay, a visiting Lecturer at Queen's University of Belfast in 1990 and an Honorary Professor at the National Law School of India University, Bangalore, Symbiosis Law School, Pune and other leading law colleges in India.

== Publications ==
He is the author of The Kesavananda Bharati Case: The untold story of struggle for supremacy by Supreme Court and Parliament (2011), a masterpiece in understanding the landmark Constitutional Case of India and the circumstances surrounding the proceedings of the Court. He has also authored Judicial Activism and Constitutional Democracy in India (1992) and Judges and Judicial Accountability (2002). He wrote frequently on constitutional and public law in law journals and newspapers.
