= Generic pharmaceutical price decay =

Effect of drug genericization in the UK

Generic pharmaceutical price decay is what happens (in the UK) once the originator brand has lost its patent exclusivity (patent expiry) and generic versions of the originator brand have been launched.

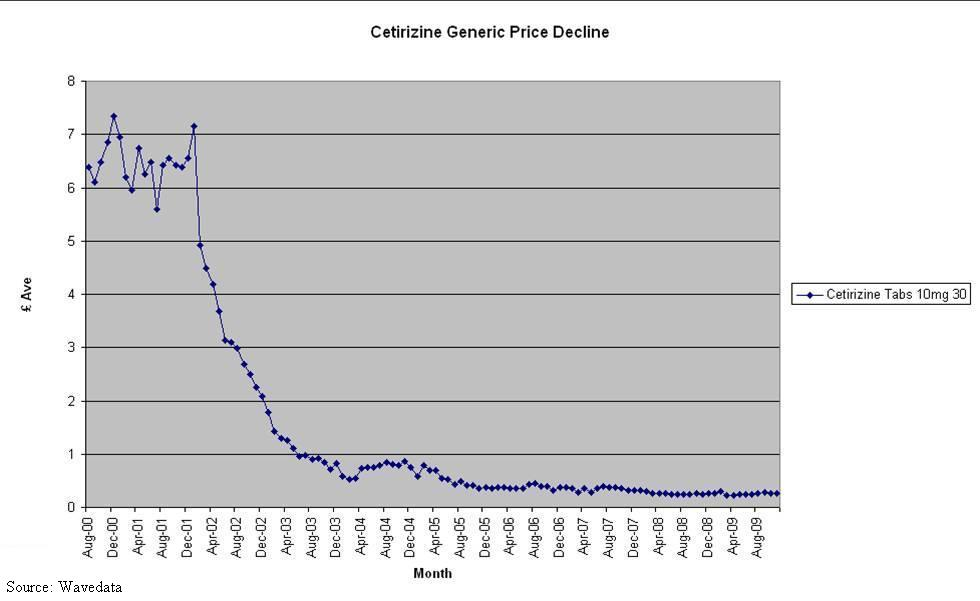
Simple 'scalloped curve' generic price decline

The number of license holders entering the market is controlled by the ease of manufacture and the number of companies making the active pharmaceutical ingredient (API). For many easy-to-manufacture solid dose tablets and capsules the manufacturing is done in India and China as the costs of production in these countries is significantly lower than in the US or Europe.

On day one of generic launch the first to market the generic product usually gets more market share than late entrants. Both manufacturers (who make their own generic products) and license only holders (who use other companies to do the manufacturing) may be represented.

If only one company is able to release a generic product into the UK market, the discount against the originator brand is likely to be small, and the price will usually follow the same trend as the brand price. However, in most cases more than one company will release stock at launch and they will compete for market share with other manufacturers and license holders. This means persuading chemists and dispensing doctors to purchase stock.

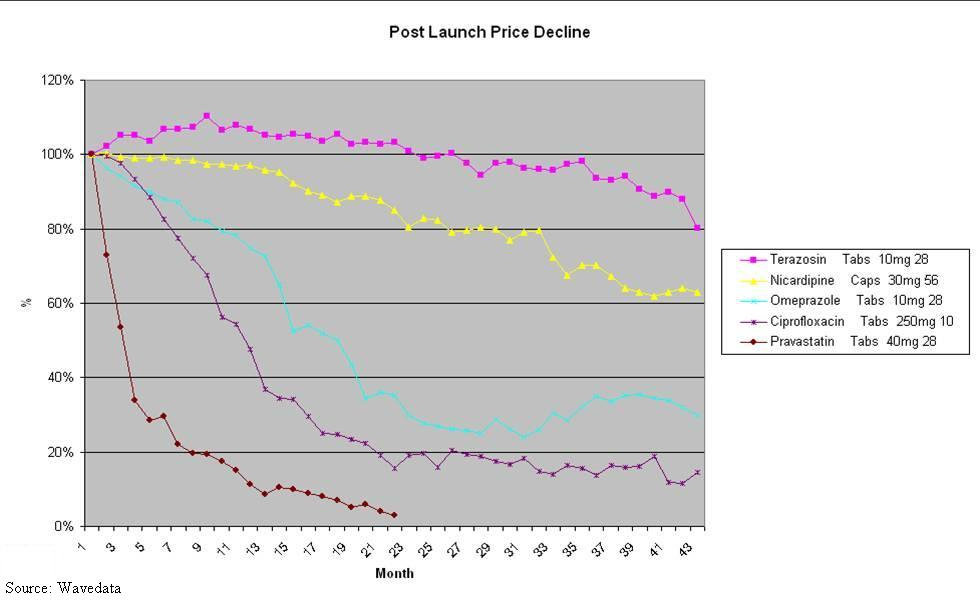
Examples showing the variability of generic price decline

As competition drives the price of the generic product down, the average price in the market typically follows a scalloped curve which will decline with time at a rate that is driven by the numbers of license holders and manufacturers.

Changes in the reimbursement price drug tariff will also serve to suppress this curve even more.

Generic substitution was planned for the England, but this was rejected in late 2010. Generic substitution would have meant that a prescription written for a branded product by a doctor would result in a pharmacist giving the patient a generic medicine. On Thursday 14 October, the UK's Department of Health announced that it would not be proceeding with the proposals to implement generic substitution. Patient safety was cited as the primary reason for the rejection of this policy.

In the case of more complex products, such as creams, inhalers and injectables, generic prices decay at a slower rate as fewer companies are able to make the product.

In the UK, the M category of the drug tariff (reimbursement prices) is used to control the profits of chemists and to reduce the UK's health care tax burden.

The rate of decay of most generic solid dose products has been shown to follow a predictable path and to have some similarity to the decay in price of other non pharmaceutical products.

Eventually price decline comes to and end and the price flattens out at approximately 20% of the original brand price.

== Bounces ==
In about 20% of cases, the average price declines to a low point some months or years after generic launch, and then rises temporarily or bounces (Dead Cat Bounce) These bounces may then initiate the onset of longer term seasonality or recurrent annual price rises.

Bounces happen when the average selling price falls below a license holder's manufacturing cost, making the product unprofitable. License holders and manufacturers then withdraw from the market, reducing the amount of competition and allowing the price to rise. They may later re-enter the market when higher prices make the product profitable once more. This usually forces the average price down again to levels lower than that seen before the start of the bounce.

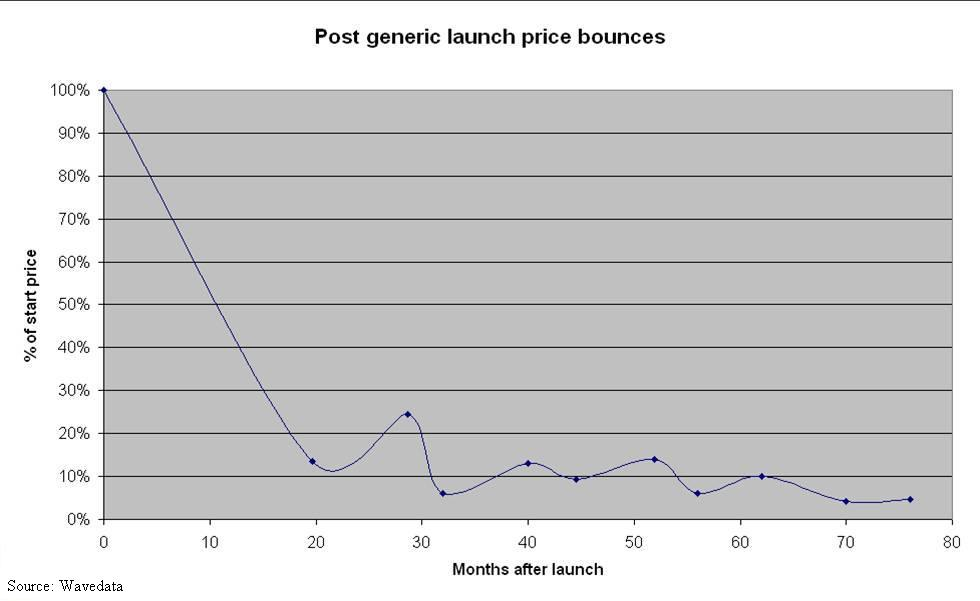
Seasonality and price bounces

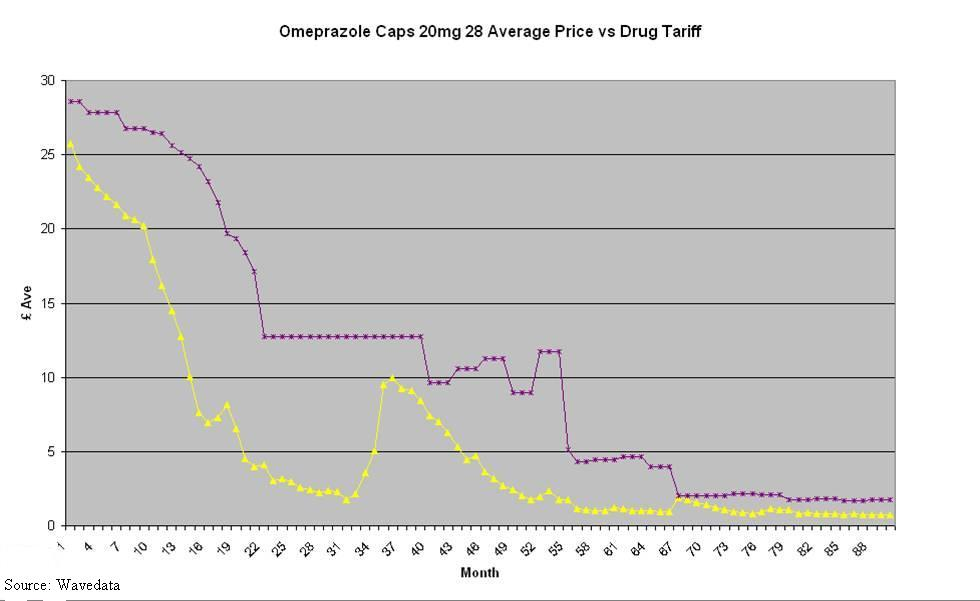
Simple example of a generic drug price bounce

The reasoning behind why some products bounce whereas others do not, is thought to lie in the rapidity of the initial price decline. In these cases manufacturers and license holders either were not able to or did not forecast the levels to which the price might drop. The period during which their product would be profitable was therefore not known, and the decline into unprofitably left them with stock which could only be sold at a loss. Additionally the product's expiry date might mean that it could not be stored until market prices recovered.

Generic manufacturers and license holders believe that the seasonality induced by these bounces may be related to the time taken to manufacture a new product and gain market access (get the medicines onto chemist's shelves in the relevant country). The period between the high price peaks in the seasonality induced by price bounces has been shown to be approximately two years.

It is possible for a product's price to be affected by seasonality in the absence of price bounces. This seasonality is caused by periods of intense competition in the UK market, and periods of calm with much less competition. In the UK traditionally employees have taken holidays in April, August and January. This is caused by religious holidays like Christmas and Easter, and by spring, summer and winter school holidays.

During holidays, wholesalers, license holders and manufacturers are less competitive than when employees are back at work. During the months when the majority of employees are at work, competing companies continually watch each other's prices and change their own selling prices on a daily or even hourly basis so as to maximize sales and profits.

The pricing trends of some products are believed to be affected by disease patterns, such as the hay fever season in May and winter flu in November. It is also possible that the exchange rates between relevant currencies may be another factor in controlling generic prices. However the evidence for this is weak.

== Equalisation ==
After loss of exclusivity and generic launch the originator brand normally continues to hold at least some market share as either some doctors continue to prescribe the brand or as the originator equalises sales prices against the generic.

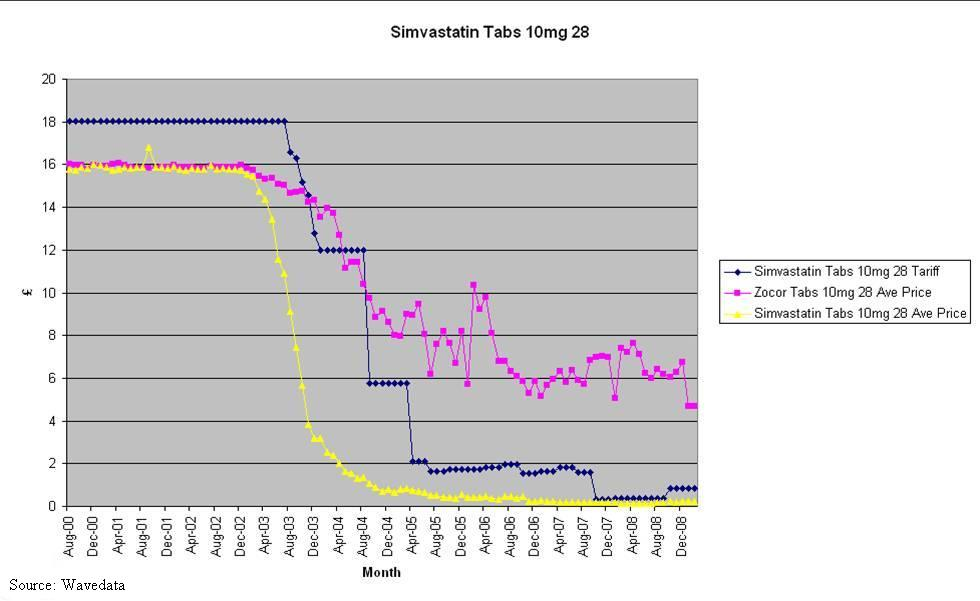
Generic, brand and reimbursement (drug tariff) price decay

Branded manufactures may build ongoing contracts with wholesalers so that the brand continues to be dispensed in pharmacies even though the prescriptions are generic. This means that an originator may offer an advantageous price to undercut the generic or parallel import. Wholesalers gets a price and supply guarantee in exchange for taking the risk that they may be paying too much in the long term.

Some companies offer 'branded generics' in the UK market. However, these are no longer common, and are not popular as their reimbursement price may be higher than the generic reimbursement price, costing the tax-payer more than a true generic.

Because the generic launch price is often at or close to the originator brand price, more profit can be made in the months following generic launch than in the months later in the product's life cycle.

== Patents ==
Generic launch can only occur once all the patents on the originator brand have expired. These may include both product and process patents, and most products can get a further two years of patent life with a SPC supplementary protection certificate and a few may get a further six months with a pediatric extension.
