= Evergreening =

Strategy to extend the lifetime of patents

Evergreening is any of various legal, business, and technological strategies by which producers (often pharmaceutical companies) extend the lifetime of their patents that are about to expire in order to retain revenues from them. Often the practice includes taking out new patents (for example over associated delivery systems or new pharmaceutical mixtures), or by buying out or frustrating competitors, for longer periods of time than would normally be permissible under the law. Robin Feldman, a law professor at UC Law SF and a leading researcher in intellectual property and patents, defines evergreening as "artificially extending the life of a patent or other exclusivity by obtaining additional protections to extend the monopoly period."

== Overview ==
In the pharmaceutical industry, evergreening may be used by manufacturers of a particular drug to avoid competition from manufacturers of generic equivalents to that drug.

Robin Feldman has documented several types of patent tactics commonly used in the U.S. by pharmaceutical companies, including evergreening, pay-for-delay, gaming the citizen petition process, and the misuse of trade secrets, among others. In one study of the prescription drug market, Feldman found that 78% of new patents associated with prescription drugs were for existing drugs.

After the older product's patent protection expires, it is legal for generic makers to make generic versions of the older product. "Doctors are still quite able to prescribe the generic version of the older product." The generic maker needs to convince prescribers that the old version is effective, and the brand manufacturer needs to convince prescribers that the new version is worth the brand cost.

In 2002, the US Federal Trade Commission (FTC) found that generic drug manufacturers intending to manufacture new drugs were subjected to legal action by the owner of the original patent up to 75% of the time, resulting in increased drug costs.

== Product hopping ==
Product hopping, or product switching, is an anti-competitive practice in which a patent, and consequent revenue stream, is extended by patenting a minor variation on the original product, thereby further delaying the entry of a generic on to the market. This can prevent competition and harm consumer welfare. Types of product hopping include changes to the form of the drug (capsule, tablet, etc), chemical changes such as adjusting chemical groups (a me-too drug) or a different enantiomeric mixture (a chiral switch), switching from short- to long-acting formulations, introduction of new inactive ingredients, and combinations of drugs that were previously sold separately.

Product hops are distinguished from genuine improvements, such as a new version of a drug with an easier route of administration that leads to meaningful benefits for patients. However, a meaningful improvement may still be considered a product hop if it was introduced as part of an anticompetitive strategy. Withholding the release of new product versions to maximize revenue from an on-market version has also emerged as a way for firms to maximize profit over patient benefit. Litigation against Gilead Sciences addressed product versioning directly, which also highlights the problems inherent in compensating patients impacted by this tactic.

The analysis of product hopping under antitrust laws is complex, in part due to the complexity and unique nature of healthcare markets. As of 2015, the distinction between encouraging innovation and preventing monopolization is unclear. One proposal is to define product hops as 1) modifying the product to prevent substitution by a generic drug and 2) encouraging prescriptions of the new version instead of the original. The switch to the new version can be encouraged by a marketing strategy or forced by discontinuing the original. Another possible factor is whether the switch would have been an economically sound decision for the company if it did not reduce competition by generics.

In one case, product hopping of the multiple sclerosis drug glatiramer acetate (Copaxone) led to a cost to consumers of $4.3 to 6.5 billion dollars over two and a half years, before the new patent was invalidated by the courts. Another example was the Alzheimer's drug memantine (Namenda). The impact of product hops can be less visible to the public than the cost of new drugs, because of a lack of awareness that the prices would have decreased due to generic competition.

== Linkage evergreening and international trade law ==
The process of evergreening may involve specific aspects of patent law and international trade law. Linkage evergreening is the process whereby pharmaceutical safety, quality and efficacy regulators are required to 'link' their normal evaluation with an assessment of whether an impending generic product may infringe an existing patent.

== By country ==
=== Australia ===
A requirement for the AUSFTA to come into force was fulfilment of the article 17.10.4 linkage obligation; done by amendments to the Therapeutic Goods Act 1989 (Cth). The amendments inserted a new section 26B which required applicants for marketing approval to certify their product would not infringe a valid patent claim, or that the patent holder had been notified of the application.

In response, the Australian government passed anti-evergreening amendments in Sections 26C and 26D of the Therapeutic Goods Act 1989 (Cth) designed to prevent patent holders from manipulating the court system to lengthen the term of the patent and delay the entry of generic pharmaceuticals into the market. They are a strong statement of Australia's legitimate expectations of benefit (that is of freedom from pharmaceutical price rises due to evergreening) in this area. The Chief Australian negotiator of this aspect of the AUSFTA stated:

We are not importing the Hatch-Waxman legislation into Australian law as a result of the free trade agreement...[Article 17.10.4] will not extend the time of the marketing approval process, and it does not add or provide any additional rights to the patent holders in that process...there is no injunction that can be applied under this article...it will be clear in the legislation tomorrow....we are establishing a measure in the marketing approval process that will fully meet the commitments under this article.

In November 2004, the US expressly signalled their disapproval of Australia's implementation of article 17.10.4 in an exchange of letters between the Australian Minister for Trade and the US Trade Representative on the implementation of the AUSFTA, in which the USTR stated:

If Australia's law is not sufficient to prevent the marketing of a product, or a product for an approved use, where the produce or use is covered by a patent, Australia will have acted inconsistently with the Agreement. We will be monitoring the matter closely, and reserve all rights and remedies as discussed below. We also remain concerned about recent amendments to sections 26B(1)(a), 26C and 26D of the Therapeutic Goods Act of 1989. Under these amendments, pharmaceutical patents owners risk incurring significant penalties when they seek to enforce their patent rights. These provisions impose a potentially significant, unjustifiable, and discriminatory burden on the enjoyment of patent rights, specifically on owners of pharmaceutical patents. I urge the Australian Government to review this matter, particularly in light of Australia's international legal obligations. The United States reserves its rights to challenge the consistency of these amendments with such obligations.

The capacity of the US to make such threats is arguably facilitated by the linkage of article 17.10.4 of the AUSFTA to a non-violation nullification of benefits provision.

=== Canada ===
In 1993, under the NAFTA-induced Canadian Notice Of Compliance (NOC) regulations, drug safety, quality and efficacy regulators at Health Canada were prevented from issuing an authorization for market entry, until all of the relevant patents on a brand name product had been proven to have expired. As a result, when a Canadian generic company (such as Apotex) submits its application to get a product approved, it also sends a Notice of Allegation (NOA) to the patent holder claiming that no patents are being infringed. The patent holder then has 45 days in which to initiate an application in the Federal Court of Canada, seeking an order to prohibit the relevant Minister from issuing a Notice of Compliance to the generic manufacturer for a period of 24 months, or upon resolution of the court application, whichever is sooner. The problems with this were analysed in the Royal Commission on the Future of Health Care in Canada or Romanow Report. In 2006, the Supreme Court of Canada ruled against an instance of drug patent evergreening, two days before the Food and Drug Regulations extended data protection on brand-name drugs from 5 to 8.5 years.

=== India ===
Indian patent Act was amended in 2005 under obligations to TRIPS. Novartis v. Union of India & Others is a landmark decision, in which Indian Supreme Court upheld rejection of Novartis patent by Indian patent office. The key basis for the rejection was the part of Indian patent law that was created by amendment in 2005, describing the patentability of new uses for known drugs and modifications of known drugs. That section, Paragraph 3d, specified that such inventions are patentable only if "they differ significantly in properties with regard to efficacy."

=== South Korea ===
The US has achieved a similar provision to article 17.10.4 of the AUSFTA in article 18.9.4 of the Republic of Korea-United States Free Trade Agreement (KORUSFTA). Such provisions are sometimes referred to as TRIPS-plus meaning that they are in addition to the patent requirements of the World Trade Organization multilateral Agreement on Trade-Related Aspects of Intellectual Property Rights agreement. Some academics prefer to refer to them as TRIPS-minus due to their potential, but controversial and still largely unproven, deleterious impact on public health.

=== United States ===
Various laws have provisions to limit the practice, but as of 2018 the issue remains a concern among legislators. According to one study, 12 top-selling drugs attempted an average 38 years of patent protection, above the granted 20 years. Another study found that nearly 80% of the top 100 drugs extended the duration of patent protection with a new patent.

Issues which prevent generics from reaching the market include:

- Lack of availability of samples to do testing; the CREATES Act was passed on December 20, 2019 to address these issues.
- Risk Evaluation and Mitigation Strategies (REMS) requirements
- Reverse payment settlements, which involve payment to delay; these have been required to be reported to the FTC for generics since 2004 and biosimilars since 2018.
- Citizen petitions and petitions for stay of action subject to Section 505(q) of the Federal Food, Drug, and Cosmetic Act allow the Food and Drug Administration to delay action on a pending generic drug application. By law, the FDA is required to prioritize these petitions. However, the citizens filing concerns are usually not individuals, but corporations. The FDA recently said branded drug manufacturers submitted 92% of all citizen petitions. Many of these petitions are filed near the date of patent expiration, effectively limiting potential competition for another 150 days.
- "Authorized generics" which are exactly the same as brand name drugs, but marketed without brand names on their labels. By law, the first generic company to market a drug gets an exclusivity period of 180 days. During this time, no other companies can market a generic product. But the company with the expiring patent is not barred from launching an "authorized generic." By selling a drug they are already making under a different name, pharmaceutical firms are effectively extending their monopoly for another six months.

== Regulation ==
The main arguments in favor of governments regulating against evergreening are that rapid entry of multiple generic competitors after patent expiry is likely to lower prices and facilitate competition, and that eventual loss of monopoly was part of the trade-off for the initial award of patent (or intellectual monopoly privilege) protection in the first place.

In Canada, the Office of Patented Medicines and Liaison under Health Canada has become an important regulatory mechanism for policing "linkage" evergreening. No attempt has been made to create a similar multidisciplinary regulatory agency in Australia. Yet, it appears that article 18.9.4 of the Republic of Korea-United States Free Trade Agreement (KORUSFTA) has been specifically drafted to permit the establishment of such a pharmaceutical patent "anti-evergreening" oversight agency.

The Office of Patented Medicines and Liaison is located in the Therapeutic Products Directorate, Health Products and Foods Branch, Health Canada. The Notice of Compliance Regulations it administers require the Minister of Health to maintain a Patent Register. This consists of patent lists submitted in respect of eligible NOC-issued drugs. The Minister responsible for Health Canada may refuse to add, or may delete, information from this Patent Register. Each patent list is audited (for example as to whether potential inclusions are mere 'evergreening' attempts) by the Office of Patented Medicines and Liaison. Reports produced by that body outline statistics relating to the maintenance of the Patent Register, including the number of patents filed, the number of patents accepted and rejected, and litigation resulting from the acceptance or rejection of patents for listing on the Patent Register. In October 2006, the Canadian federal government recognized that some brand-name companies had been abusing the NOC Regulations. It limited their use of 'evergreening' follow-on patents by promulgating regulations that prevented any new patents they filed after a generic company had submitted an application for approval of its product from being considered in the NOC Regulations process. Moreover, the new regulations made it clear that patents covering areas without direct therapeutic application, such as processes or intermediates, could not be used to delay generic approval.

In Australia, anti-evergreening amendments to the Therapeutic Goods Act 1983 (Cth) were part of the package of legislation required to be passed by the Australian Government as a precondition to entry into force of the Australia-United States Free Trade Agreement (AUSFTA). They provide that where a certificate has been given under s26B by a generic manufacturer and the patent holder wishes to claim a patent and institute infringement proceedings, he or she must first certify that the proceedings are being commenced in good faith, have reasonable prospects of success (as defined in s26C(4)) and will be conducted without unreasonable delay. If the certificate is found to be false or misleading, fines of up to $10 million apply and the Cth Attorney General is permitted to join the action to recoup losses to the PBS. Section 26D provides that a patent holder who seeks an interlocutory injunction to prevent the marketing of the generic pharmaceutical must obtain leave from the government to do so.

=== TRIPS ===
Both the International Federation of Pharmaceutical Manufacturing Associations (IFPMA) and the US PhRMA have stated that the Australian anti-evergreening provisions are inconsistent with obligations under the World Trade Organization Agreement on Trade-Related Aspects of Intellectual Property Rights TRIPS article 27 which prohibits discrimination in an area of technology (in this case pharmaceuticals). The argument is that the Australian anti-"linkage evergreening" legislation affects only pharmaceutical patents and is therefore discriminatory under TRIPS.

On the other hand, international trade law recognises that where a unique problem arises specifically referable only to a particular field of technology, a solution applying sui generis only to that field of technology cannot be said to be discriminatory according to the ordinary meaning and purpose of the TRIPS agreement or the AUSFTA as required by article AUSFTA 21.9.2 (incorporating articles 31 and 32 of the Vienna Convention on the Law of Treaties (VCLT). The decision of the World Trade Organization Dispute Resolution panel in Canada – Patent Protection of Pharmaceutical Products case, for example, accepted that it was not inconsistent with TRIPS to provide for distinct patent rules that responded to practical consequences of differences between fields of technology. Almost all nations including the United States now have anti-evergreening legislation as part of their public health policy and none of this legislation (which is clearly targeted at a problem particular to the pharmaceutical industry) has been argued to be contrary to TRIPS. Further, there are a number of obligations imposed by the AUSFTA that relate to the enjoyment of patent rights for pharmaceuticals alone, including extension of the terms of a pharmaceutical patent to compensate the patent owner for unreasonable curtailment of the effective patent term as a result of the marketing approval process(17.9.8(b)). This is clearly not discriminatory because the issue of delays in enjoyment of patent rights due to the marketing approval process arises only in the context of pharmaceutical patents.

== Future ==
In terms of future evergreening strategies, patent holders may:

1. seek to make incremental patentable innovations to existing products with soon-to-expire patents through the generic arm of their own company and launch early to secure market share (supragenerics),
2. attempt to make separately patentable nanotechnology or biologic versions of such pharmaceuticals through the generic arm of their own company and launch early to secure market share,
3. seek to exclude generic companies from the safety, quality and efficacy data they need to prepare for springboarding (early market launch after patent expiry) using TRIPs-plus data exclusivity protections and
4. seek to extend exclusivity on a soon-to-patent-expire-pharmaceutical by patenting a genetic test to establish potential toxicity or efficacy (pharmacogenomics).

== See also ==
- Chemical patent
- Design around
- Patent cliff
- Reverse payment patent settlement ("pay for delay")
- Submarine patent
- Supplementary protection certificate
