= Automatic Generic Substitution =

Automatic Generic Substitution is a proposal by the Department of Health (DH) whereby in January 2010 pharmacists could be obliged to substitute a generic version (a version of the drug with the same active ingredient) of a medication even if the prescriber had written the prescription for a specific brand, as part of a new deal on drug pricing.

This is different from generic prescribing. In most cases, receiving a generic medicine is fully appropriate and effective for patient treatment and should continue. Indeed, generic prescribing already accounts for 83% of all prescriptions in the UK.

The DH is conducting a public formal consultation on the arrangements for the implementation of Automatic Generic Substitution. The consultation document can be found here

Currently, Automatic Generic Substitution is not permitted under UK law, except in an emergency or under strict hospital control.

== Pharmacy dispensing rules ==
Under current dispensing rules, the prescriber writes a prescription for a branded or generic medicine, which is dispensed by a pharmacist.

Under the proposed pharmacy dispensing rules, if Automatic Generic Substitution is introduced, the pharmacist may dispense either the prescribed product, or they may replace it with a generic or another brand without being required to inform the patient or healthcare professional.

It has been indicated by the DH that a prescriber will be able to tick a "do not substitute" box to prevent a proprietary medicine being replaced with a generic alternative. A group of people drawn from academia, medicine and patient groups has reported that it may not be adequate to safeguard patients. They state an example of when patients request a repeat prescription that may not be written by their doctor.

== Variations between generics ==
Generic medicines have the same active ingredient as the branded medicine, but are not always identical, which could affect some patients. The amount of drug that finally reaches the site of action is known as the bioavailability, directly impacting on the effectiveness and tolerability of a drug.

For a generic medicine to be considered bioequivalent, the European Medicines Agency (EMEA) requires that the bioavailability lies between 80% and 125% of the original branded medicine.

Patients can be switched between different generic medicines, which can mean that they might receive a generic medicine with effectively 25% more active ingredient than the branded medicine on one occasion and one with effectively 20% less active ingredient on the next.

== Impact on patient adherence ==
Generic medicines often have different sizes, shapes, colours and packaging to each other, and to the branded medicine. Switching between medications has been shown to significantly reduce adherence to treatment. Poor adherence is known to be associated with worse outcomes and increased costs for a variety of conditions.

These problems are exacerbated in elderly patients, who are more likely to be taking multiple medications.

It is estimated that £800 million worth of drugs is wasted annually in primary care. A report from a group of people drawn from academia, medicine and patient groups suggests this could increase further with a reduction in patient adherence due to Automatic Generic Substitution.

Under Automatic Generic Substitution, a patient could receive a different medication, with a different appearance and dosage instructions, on each visit to the pharmacy.

== Generic prescribing in the UK ==
There are many cases where generic prescribing is fully appropriate and vital to containing costs. Generic prescribing in the UK is currently at 83%. The Association of the British Pharmaceutical Industry (ABPI) suggests that the maximum possible level for generic prescribing would be in the region of 90%, as a number of medicines have either no generic equivalent or are not appropriate for substitution, e.g. slow-release formulations. Prescribers now commonly prescribe a generic over a brand-name product in cases where it does not present any significant disadvantages to their patients.

== The options for introducing Automatic Generic Substitution ==
The DH is proposing three options for introducing generic substitution:

- Option 1 – do nothing
- Option 2 – Introduce generic substitution but with specific medicines excluded
- Option 3 – Introduce generic substitution but with specific medicines included

The DH favours Option 3; Introduction of dispensing flexibility but limiting the scheme in such a way that the arrangements only apply to a selected group of products on a select list

The initial inclusion list for Option 3 can be found here

If Option 3 is adopted, the list can be "revised" by DH without any further consultation and may be revised up to four times per year.

A group of people drawn from academia, medicine and patient groups has raised concerns in a report, ‘Automatic Generic Substitution – Clinical Implications for Patients’ that any substitution could be detrimental to the patient. It is known that many medicines have the potential to interact with each other. Medicines on the inclusion list could be substituted for a different version and interact differently with a patient’s established medicine.

This could be a particular issue for the elderly, who often have multiple conditions and receive multiple medications. A study of patients registered with 201 UK general practices showed that patients aged 65–69 years received repeat prescriptions for an average of 5.9 medications in 2005.
