= Supplementary protection certificate =

Type of intellectual property right

In the European Economic Area (European Union member countries, Iceland, Liechtenstein and Norway), a supplementary protection certificate (SPC) is a sui generis intellectual property (IP) right that extends the duration of certain rights associated with a patent. It enters into force after expiry of a patent upon which it is based. This type of right is available for various regulated, biologically active agents, namely human or veterinary medicaments and plant protection products (e.g. insecticides, and herbicides). Supplementary protection certificates were introduced to encourage innovation by compensating for the long time needed to obtain regulatory approval of these products (i.e. authorisation to put these products on the market).

A supplementary protection certificate comes into force only after the corresponding general patent expires. It normally has a maximum lifetime of 5 years. The duration of the SPC can, however, be extended to 5.5 years when the SPC relates to a human medicinal product for which data from clinical trials conducted in accordance with an agreed Paediatric Investigation Plan (PIP) have been submitted (as set out in Article 36 of Regulation (EC) No 1901/2006).

The total combined duration of market exclusivity of a general patent and SPC cannot normally exceed 15 years. However, the reward of a 6-month SPC extension for the submission of data from an agreed PIP can extend this combined duration to 15.5 years.

SPCs extend the monopoly period for a "product" (active ingredient or a combination of active ingredients) that is protected by a patent. For many SPC applications, there is no controversy about the definition of the "product" or whether it is protected by the patent upon which the SPC application was based. However, there are other SPC applications (particularly for medicinal products containing multiple active ingredients) where there may not be clear answers to questions such as what is a permissible definition of a "product", and what test should be applied for determining whether a patent protects that "product".

Supplementary protection certificates in the European Union are based primarily upon two regulations. Although all countries in the EU are required to provide supplementary protection certificates, no unified cross-recognition exist. Applications must be filed and approved on a country-by-country basis.

== Scope ==
According to Article 4 of Council Regulation (EEC) No 1768/92, the scope of an SPC extends "only to the product covered by the authorization to place the corresponding medicinal product on the market and for any use of the product as a medicinal product that has been authorized before the expiry of the certificate".

The European Court of Justice has decided, however, that the scope of an SPC is sometimes capable of encompassing more than just the single form of the active ingredient that is included in the medicinal product authorised for sale. Thus, in case C-392/97, the European Court of Justice held that: "where an active ingredient in the form of a salt is referred to in the marketing authorisation concerned and is protected by a basic patent in force, the certificate is capable of covering the active ingredient as such and also its various derived forms such as salts and esters, as medicinal products, in so far as they are covered by the protection of the basic patent".

== Legal basis ==
Supplementary protection certificates in the European Union were based primarily upon two regulations:

- Council Regulation (EEC) No 1768/92 of 18 June 1992 concerning the creation of a supplementary protection certificate for medicinal products which entered into force on 2 January 1993. This has been cancelled by the below specified recodified regulation No 469/2009 with effect from May 2009
- Regulation (EC) No 1610/96 of the European Parliament and of the Council of 23 July 1996 concerning the creation of a supplementary protection certificate for plant protection products which entered into force on 8 February 1997

The first Regulation was repealed and replaced by the following one:

- Regulation (EC) No 469/2009 of the European Parliament and of the Council of 6 May 2009 concerning the supplementary protection certificate for medicinal products (Codified version).

(In 2020, the European Commission published an evaluation of Regs. 469/2009 and 1610/96.)

Supplementary protection certificates may come into life at the expiry of a national or European patent. However, the European Patent Convention (EPC) needed to be modified to allow such "extension" of the term of European patent. Article 63 of the EPC was modified on 17 December 1991 to specify to, although European patents have a term of 20 years as from the date of filing of the application (Art. 63(1)),

" nothing (...) shall limit the right of a Contracting State to extend the term of a European patent, or to grant corresponding protection which follows immediately on expiry of the term of the patent, under the same conditions as those applying to national patents: (...)
(b) if the subject-matter of the European patent is a product or a process of manufacturing a product or a use of a product which has to undergo an administrative authorisation procedure required by law before it can be put on the market in that State. "

This constituted the first revision of the European Patent Convention since its signature in 1973.

The paediatric extension is based primarily upon:

- Regulation 1901/2006 of 12 December 2006 on medicinal products for paediatric use and amending Regulation 1768/92, Directive 2001/20/EC, Directive 2001/83/EC and Regulation (EC) No 726/2004
- Regulation 1902/2006 of 20 December 2006 amending Regulation 1901/2006 on medicinal products for paediatric use

In 2019, Regulation 2019/933 was adopted. It amended Reg. 469/2009 to introduce an "SPC manufacturing waiver", i.e. a derogation allowing the manufacturing of SPC-protected products for the purpose of either exporting them to third countries, or of stockpiling them until the expiry of the SPC (during the final 6 months of the SPC term), subject to a number of safeguards (notification, export logo, etc.).

== Determination of term ==
The term of an SPC depends on the date of issuance of the first marketing authorization (MA) within the EEA and can be determined by the equation:

Term = date of 1st MA in the EEA − date of filing of corresponding patent − 5 years

Under normal circumstances, this means the following.

- No SPC term is available if less than 5 years have elapsed between the date of filing of the corresponding patent and the date of issuance of the first MA in the EEA.
- If the first MA is issued more than five years but less than ten years after the filing date of the corresponding patent, an SPC is granted for a term corresponding to the period elapsed between the five-year point and the MA issuance date.
- If the first MA is issued more than ten years after the filing date of the corresponding patent, an SPC is granted for a five-year term.

There have been very few cases where there was any controversy over the precise date of the 1st MA in the EEA. The Hässle AB case (ECJ case C-127/00) was one of that small number. In that case, the ECJ ruled that the decisive date for SPC purposes is the date of an authorisation from a regulatory body tasked with assessing safety and efficacy, and not the date of a subsequent authorisation that may be required under national pricing or reimbursement provisions.

So-called "centralised" (European Medicines Agency / European Commission) MAs were introduced by Regulation 2309/93 and became available in January 1995 (i.e. some 2 years after the introduction of the original SPC legislation for medicinal products). The introduction of these authorisations added a new layer of complexity to the issue of determination of the date of a MA. This is because there are two dates associated with "centralised" authorisations, namely: (1) the date of the European Commission's decision to issue an authorisation; and (2) the date of notification of that decision to the MA applicant. Date (2) is usually a few days (e.g. 2 to 4 days) later than date (1). Although the standard practice of many national patent offices seems to be to calculate SPC term based upon date (1), an October 2011 article in Scrip Regulatory Affairs by Mike Snodin argues that this standard practice is incorrect and that date (2) should be used instead (with the result that some products may be entitled to a slightly longer SPC term than previously thought). Paramount amongst the reasons for preferring date (2) to date (1) is that a "centralised" authorisation does not become effective until it is notified to the MA applicant.

The UK Intellectual Property Office has now accepted Snodin's arguments on this point and has changed its standard practice regarding the calculation of SPC term. It remains to be seen whether any other national offices will follow suit. However, inspection of Belgian SPC certificates for products authorised via the "centralised" procedure reveals that at least the patent office in Belgium already appears to base calculations of SPC term upon date (2). Thus, there are divergent practices across different territories within Europe with regard to the selection of a date for a "centralised" MA, with Belgium and the UK IPO being in the minority. If the issue were ever to be debated in a national court, this fact that there are divergent practices across different territories could provide basis for such a court to seek an authoritative ruling from the ECJ in relation to which of dates (1) and (2) should be used for SPCs. This is because, as European Commission legislation, the Regulations governing SPCs should be interpreted consistently across all member states of the EU.

An MA in Switzerland was also considered as being a first MA for the calculation of the SPC duration, even though Switzerland is not part of the European Economic Area (EEA). This is because such a MA was automatically effective in Liechtenstein, which is a member of the EEA (since 1 May 1995). This was decided by the European Court of Justice (ECJ) in joined cases Novartis et al. v. Comptroller-General and Ministère de l'Economie v. Millennium Pharmaceuticals. The same point was also confirmed in case C-617/12 (AstraZeneca AB v Comptroller General of Patents, Designs and Trade Marks), in a case where the data that persuaded Swissmedic to grant the (earlier) Swiss MA was held by the European Medicines Agency to not be complete or persuasive enough to justify the grant of a MA under EU legislation (Directive 2001/83/EC). However, as answer to the decision of the ECJ the contract between Switzerland and Liechtenstein was amended. Since 1 July 2005 the automatic effect of a Swiss MA in Liechtenstein is abolished. The recognition is now delayed by a time period, which is normally 12 months.

=== Paediatric extension ===
Article 36 of Regulation 1901/2006 provides for a 6-month extension to SPC term. The extension is available only under certain conditions, the most notable being the requirement for the submission of a new MA application containing data from all trials conducted in accordance with an agreed Paediatric Investigation Plan (PIP).

Consequences of the 6-month SPC extension include:

- the maximum term of an SPC can now be up to 5.5 years; and
- the maximum duration of market exclusivity (patent + SPC) can now be up to at least 15.5 years.

An extension of an SPC can only be awarded if there is an SPC to extend. As an unextended SPC only has a positive term if more than 5 years have elapsed between patent filing and MA issuance, this leads to the following two questions.

(1) Is an SPC available if less than 5 years and 1 day have elapsed between filing of the corresponding patent and issuance of the first MA in the EEA?

(2) If the answer to (1) is yes, what term should be awarded to the (unextended) SPC?

A July 2007 paper by Snodin and Miles, put forward three possible answers to this combination of two questions.

If the answer to question (1) is no, then it is not relevant to consider question (2). This corresponds to "Model B" of the 2007 Snodin and Miles paper, and produces a curious situation where longer marketing exclusivity can be obtained if the issuance of the first MA in the EEA is delayed (to at least 5 years and 1-day from filing of the corresponding patent).

If the answer to question (1) is yes, then question (2) becomes relevant. This question can be answered in two ways, corresponding to either "Model A" or "Model C" of the 2007 Snodin and Miles paper.

Model A assumes that SPC term can validly be either zero or negative if 5 years or less have elapsed from filing of the corresponding patent to issuance of the first MA in the EEA. In this event, a positive (and non-zero) SPC term is obtained (after extension) if the time from patent filing to MA issuance is more than 4.5 years.

Model C assumes that all term calculations that provide a negative answer are 'rounded up' to zero. This has the consequence of providing a minimum of 6 months of SPC term, irrespective of how little time has elapsed from patent filing to MA issuance.

Subsequent to the publication of the Snodin and Miles article, Merck & Co. filed SPC applications for the product sitagliptin. For example, from mid-August to mid-September 2007, Merck & Co. filed SPC applications in various countries, including the UK, Ireland, the Netherlands and Italy. These SPC applications provided an early opportunity for Models A to C to be tested in practice. Curiously, the patent offices of various EU member states did not reach any consensus on which model is correct. For example, the Netherlands and the UK favoured Model A, Germany, Portugal and Slovenia favoured Model B and Greece favoured Model C.

In connection with an appeal against refusal of the SPC application in Germany, and in view of the different stances taken by different national patent offices, the German Federal Court of Justice (Bundesgerichtshof) sought clarification of the law from the Court of Justice of the EU (in case C-125/10).

The decision of the Court of Justice, delivered on 8 December 2011, essentially agreed with Model A of the 2007 Snodin and Miles paper. Thus, useful (extended) supplementary protection can now be obtained so long as at least 4 years, 6 months and one day has elapsed from the date of patent filing to the date of the first MA for the product in the EEA.

== Case law ==
ECJ cases C-195/09 and C-427/09 effectively ruled that SPCs for medicaments (human or veterinary) are only available for those "products" that:

(a) are protected by a patent;

(b) have been subject to an administrative authorisation procedure; and

(c) have not been placed on the market anywhere in the EEA as a medicinal product prior to being subject to safety and efficacy testing and a regulatory review.

Until recently, decisions C-195/09 and C-427/09 could have been interpreted as ruling out the possibility of SPC protection for all "products" previously included in medicinal products that were marketed prior to the date(s) of the Marketing Authorisation(s) (MA(s)) specified in the SPC application. This is because the ECJ's rulings in C-195/09 and C-427/09 were based in part upon a desire to ensure that national patent offices are not required to assess whether an earlier MA was compliant with the standards for testing of safety and efficacy that were introduced in the 1970s (meaning that all prior MAs, whether or not compliant with those standards, should be treated equally under the SPC legislation).

However, the decision in Neurim Pharmaceuticals (C-130/11) has cast doubt upon this interpretation. In C-130/11, the ECJ held that an SPC can be granted regardless of the prior marketing of earlier (veterinary) medicinal products containing the "product" in question. Thus, cases C-195/09 and C-427/09 (which, in common with C-130/11, related to SPC applications based upon newly patented uses for old "products") could perhaps now be viewed as being of relevance only to those "products" that were marketed before being subject to a regulatory review. However, this might necessitate patent offices making a determination of whether prior MAs are compliant with current standards (i.e. whether the "product" had been subject to safety and efficacy testing prior to being granted an MA). As this is precisely the kind of determination that the ECJ had previously been keen for patent offices to avoid, further references to the ECJ may be necessary to clarify precisely which "products" fall within the scope of the SPC legislation and which do not.

The Neurim decision was reversed in 2020 by the Santen decision, that clarified that no SPC may be granted for a new use of a previously approved active ingredient, in line with the traditional requirement of "one SPC per product".

With respect to (a) above, the question of how to determine whether a "product" is protected by a patent is the subject of ongoing controversy. Cases such as C-322/10 and C-422/10 have indicated that the "product" needs to be "specified [or identified] in the wording of the claims". However, the precise meaning of this test is yet to be clarified. The Teva decision (2018) slightly relaxed that requirement, by clarifying that, in respect of a product composed of several active ingredients, Art. 3(a) requires that "even if the combination of active ingredients of which that product is composed is not expressly mentioned in the claims of the basic patent, those claims relate necessarily and specifically to that combination".

Further, although the SPC legislation mentions only Directives 2001/83/EC and 2001/82/EC as the "administrative authorisation procedure" for human or veterinary medicaments, SPCs are known to have been granted when MAs have not been obtained via those procedures (but instead via procedures that involve a similar level of safety and efficacy testing).

== Statistics ==
According to research, more than 8,000 SPCs for medicinal and plant protection products have been filed in Europe between 1991 and 2003.

== See also ==
- Generic pharmaceutical price decay
- Orphan drug
- European Federation of Pharmaceutical Industries and Associations (EFPIA)
