= Patent cliff =

Sales phenomenon

The term patent cliff refers to the phenomenon of patent expiration dates and an abrupt drop in sales that follows for a group of products capturing a high percentage of a market. Usually, these phenomena are noticed when they affect blockbuster products—a blockbuster product in the pharmaceutical industry, for example, is defined as a product with sales exceeding US$1 billion per year. In the United States, when a product’s patent expiration comes after 20 years, there is a sudden decrease in a particular company’s annual income. After the expiration date, the combatants then can start selling that particular drug in the market. This was a Patent Cliff.

The abrupt drop in sales expected after the date of patent expiration can be estimated with the following formula:

$Sales = {A}*{Y^B}$

where A is the peak sales value before the patent expiration and Y the years after the peak sales year (the peak sales year is considered year 0), and B is an exponent with value -1.032. The formula above could be simplified for practical calculations to:

$Sales = \frac{A}{Y}$

== Pharmaceutical industry ==
For example, Plavix, Singulair, Diovan and Lipitor are all chemical blockbuster drugs discovered in the early 1990s, with patent expiration date falling between 2011 and 2015; and Rituxan, Humira, Novolog and Avastin are biologic blockbuster drugs discovered in the late 1990s, with patent expiration date between 2014 and 2019. Thus, the revenue obtained through the sales of these products is at risk of falling drastically within the years of the patent cliff, which is often seen as an opportunity for other companies to generate revenue from selling generic or similar products.

Pharmaceutical companies expend significant resources in seeking routes to patent extensions. For instance, one method is to develop a new delivery method for the therapeutic.

== See also ==
- Biosimilar
- Evergreening
