= Robin Feldman =

American law professor

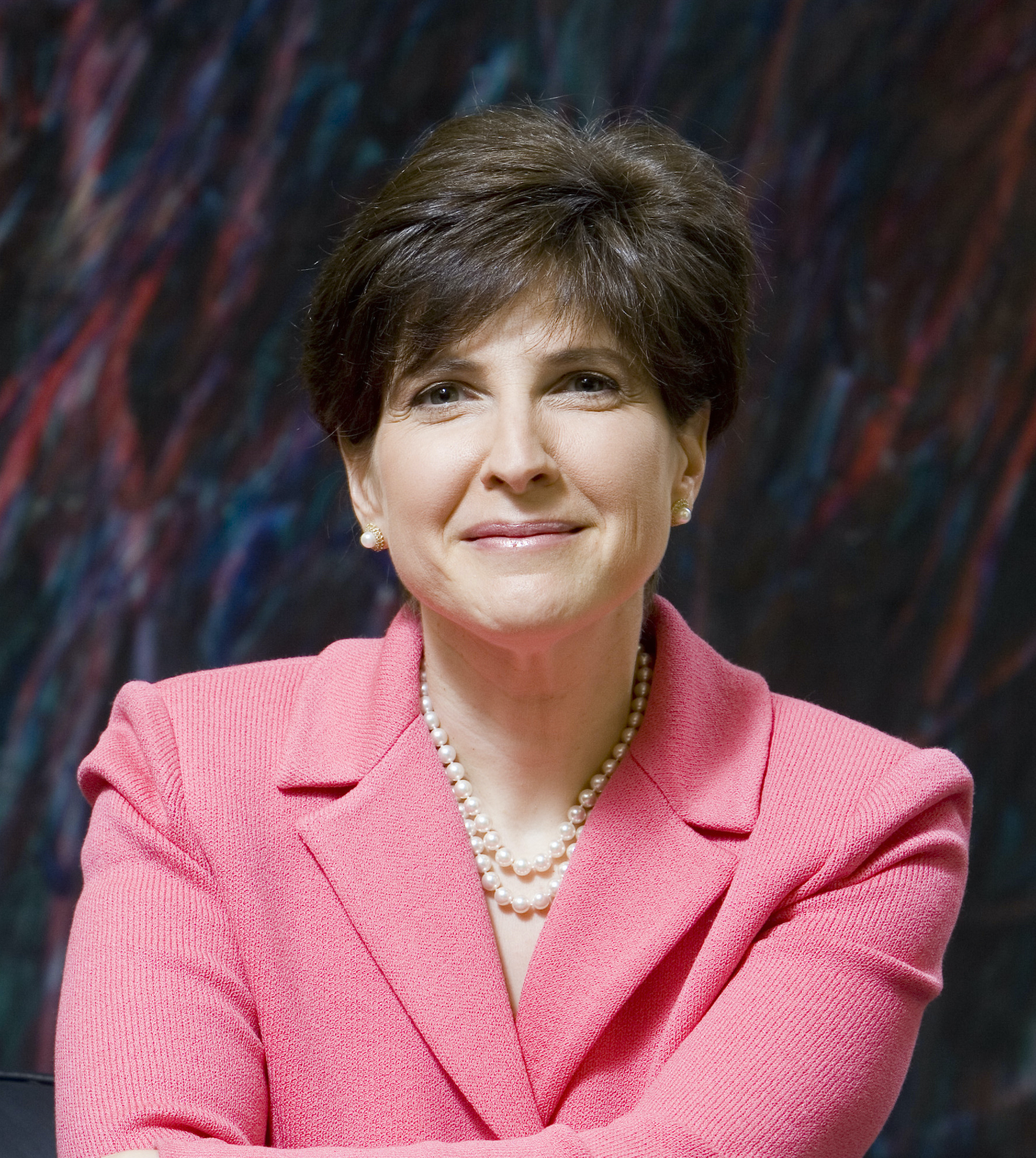
- Occupations: Law Professor, Author
- Known for: Intellectual property, healthcare law
- Title: Arthur J. Goldberg Distinguished Professor of Law

Academic background
- Education: Stanford University (BA), Stanford Law School; (JD)

Academic work
- Institutions: UC Hastings College of Law
- Main interests: intellectual property law, healthcare law with a focus on the pharmaceutical industry and drug prices, artificial intelligence
- Website: https://www.uchastings.edu/people/robin-feldman/

Robin Feldman is a law professor, researcher, and author best known for her contributions to intellectual property and health care law. Feldman is the Arthur J. Goldberg Distinguished Professor of Law at the UC Law San Francisco (formerly University of California, Hastings College of Law.) Feldman is a widely cited expert on intellectual property and health care law, particularly as it relates to the pharmaceutical industry, drug policy, and drug pricing.

== Education ==
Feldman received her undergraduate education at Stanford University in 1983. She received her J.D. from Stanford Law School in 1989 and was awarded the institution's honor for graduating second in her class. After graduation, she clerked for the Honorable Joseph Sneed of the 9th Circuit Court of Appeals. Her first job in legal education was as a lecturer at Stanford Law School.

== Academic career ==
Feldman is an expert in patent law and has been called a “preeminent researcher on issues of patent litigation” and a “leading voice on patent policy.” Her 2012 article, “The Giants Among Us,” written with Thomas Ewing and published in the Stanford Technology Law Review, was widely acclaimed for its insights to patent aggregators and for its influence in the field. One reviewer called it “one of the most important contributions to the debate about NPEs, patent aggregators and the state of the US patent marketplace.” Feldman is also known for her expertise in the emerging intellectual property areas affecting artificial intelligence. In March 2018, she served on the Artificial Intelligence: Emerging Opportunities, Challenges, and Implications panel convened by the Comptroller General of the U.S.

Feldman has published and been interviewed extensively on the role pharmaceutical companies play in sustaining high drug prices. She has published two books on the topic (see Publications below) and numerous journal articles. Her 2018 journal article, “May Your Drug Price be Evergreen,” found that more than two-thirds of drugs issued by pharmaceutical companies are not new drugs but variations of previously patented drugs. This research paper has been widely cited, including in a 2022 op-ed by The New York Times titled, "Save America's Patent System."

Feldman briefed the Senate Committee on the Judiciary Subcommittee on Antitrust, Competition Policy, and Consumer Rights about drug pricing and regulations in 2016 and the House Ways and Means Subcommittee on Health about lowering Medicare drug prices through competition in 2019, among others.

She is the Director of the Center for Innovation at UC Hastings, which is a think tank on legal policy, with three primary areas of focus: Startup Legal Garage, the Law & Medicine Initiative, and the AI & Capital Markets Initiative. Startup Legal Garage provides law students with real-world experience advising early-stage tech and life science firms.

In 2014, she was named one of Law.com's “Women Leaders in Tech Law.” In 2016, she was named the winner of a World Technology Award for Law.

== Publications ==
Feldman has published five books. Drugs, Money, & Secret Handshakes: The Unstoppable Growth of Prescription Drug Prices and Drug Wars: How Big Pharma Raises Prices and Keeps Generics off the Market outline how pharmaceutical companies maneuver using patent laws and take advantage of the structure of the health care industry to protect their revenues. One reviewer described Drugs, Money, and Secret Handshakes as "one hundred power-packed pages of rich data and sober analysis," while lay readers have appreciated the book's courage for revealing the role pharmaceutical companies play in maintaining high drug prices and the book's clear presentation.

Her book Rethinking Patent Law was lauded as "an important contribution to the field." Her first book was titled The Role of Science in Law and examined the relationship between the two fields.

Most recently, Feldman published AI Versus IP: Rewriting Creativity (2025), which "offers a balanced perspective" on the contrasting interests of expanding AI usage in every day life and the rights and interests of IP property law for artists and authors.

Feldman has authored numerous scholarly articles for academic journals, including Stanford Law Technology Review, Journal of Law and Biosciences, and the New England Journal of Medicine. Her opinion pieces have appeared in many popular outlets, including The Washington Post, STAT, and the New York Times.

== Selected publications ==
=== Books ===
- Drugs, Money, and Secret Handshakes: The Unstoppable Growth of Prescription Drug Prices (Cambridge University Press, 2019)
- Drug Wars: How Big Pharma Raises Prices and Keeps Generics off the Market, with Evan Frondorf,(Cambridge University Press, 2017)
- Rethinking Patent Law (Harvard University Press, 2012)
- The Role of Science in Law (Oxford University Press, 2009)
- AI Versus IP: Rewriting Creativity (Cambridge University Press, 2025)

=== Selected journal articles ===
- The Insufficiency of Antitrust Analysis for Patent Misuse (Hastings Law Journal, 2003)
- The America Invents Act 500: Effects of patent monetization entities on US litigation (Duke Law and Technology Review, 2012)
- Copyright and Open Access at the Bedside (with John Newman)(New England Journal of Medicine, 2011)
- Do Patent Licensing Demands Mean Innovation? (with Mark A. Lemley)(Iowa Law Review, 2015)
- Is Patent Enforcement Efficient? (with Mark A. Lemley) (Boston University Law Review, 2018)
- America Invents Act 500 Expanded: Effects of Patent Monetization Entities (with Sara Jeruss & Joshua H. Walker) (Duke Law and Technology Review, 2012)
- The Giants Among Us (with Tom Ewing) (Stanford Technology Law Review, 2012)
- May Your Drug Price Be Evergreen (Journal of Law and Biosciences, 2018)
- Open Letter on Ethical Norms in Intellectual Property (with Mark A. Lemley, Jonathan S. Masur, & Arti K. Rai)(Harvard Journal of Law and Technology, 2016)
- Perverse Incentives: Why Everyone Prefers High Drug Prices -- Except for Those Who Pay the Bills (Harvard Journal on Legislation, 2020)
- Negative Innovation: When Patents are Bad for Patients (with David A. Hyman, W. Nicholson Price II, and Mark J. Ratain)(Nature Biotechnology, 2021)

=== Public Database of Drug Patents ===
- Evergreen Drug Patent Search Database
