= Generic drug =

Pharmaceutical equivalent to a brand-name product

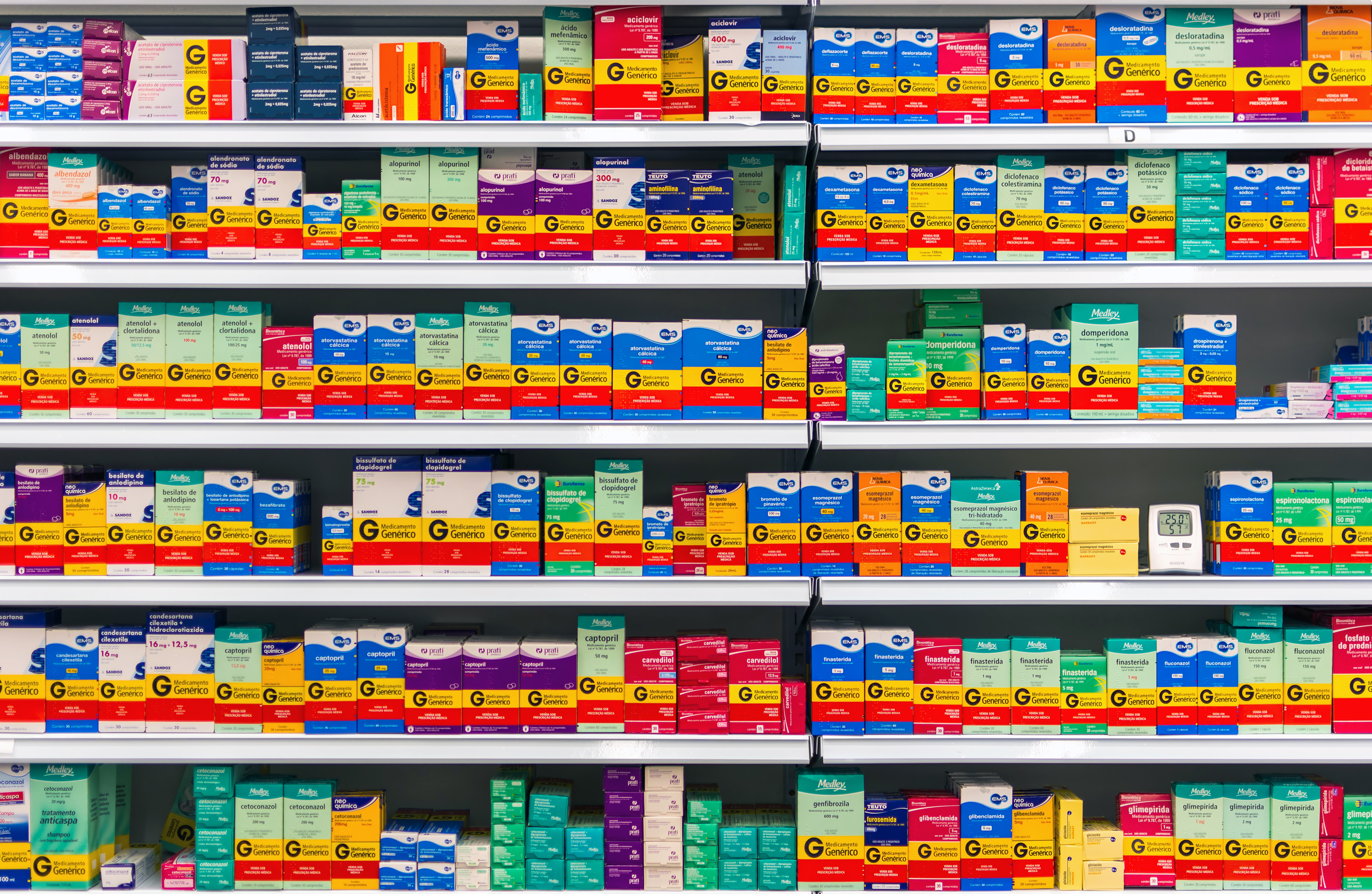
In some countries, such as Brazil (photo) and France, more than 20% of all drug sales in units are generic.

A generic drug is a pharmaceutical drug that contains the same chemical substance as a proprietary drug that was originally protected by chemical patents. Generic drugs are allowed for sale after the patents on the original drugs expire. Because the active chemical substance is the same, the medical profile of generics is equivalent in performance compared to their performance at the time when they were patented drugs. A generic drug has the same active pharmaceutical ingredient (API) as the original, but it may differ in some characteristics such as the manufacturing process, formulation, excipients, color, taste, and packaging.

Although they may not be associated with a particular company, generic drugs are usually subject to government regulations in the countries in which they are dispensed. They are labeled with the name of the manufacturer and a generic non-proprietary name such as the United States Adopted Name (USAN) or International Nonproprietary Name (INN) of the drug. A generic drug must contain the same active ingredients as the original brand-name formulation. The U.S. Food and Drug Administration (FDA) requires generics to be identical to or within an acceptable bioequivalent range of their brand-name counterparts, with respect to pharmacokinetic and pharmacodynamic properties.

Biopharmaceuticals, such as monoclonal antibodies, differ biologically from small-molecule drugs. Biosimilars have active pharmaceutical ingredients that are almost identical to the original product and are typically regulated under an extended set of rules, but they are not the same as generic drugs as the active ingredients are not the same as those of their reference products. In most cases, generic products become available after the patent protections afforded to the drug's original developer expire. Once generic drugs enter the market, competition often leads to substantially lower prices for both the original brand-name product and its generic equivalents. In most countries, patents give 20 years of protection. However, many countries and regions, such as the European Union and the United States, may grant up to five years of additional protection ("patent term restoration") if manufacturers meet specific goals, such as conducting clinical trials for pediatric patients.

Manufacturers, wholesalers, insurers, and drugstores can all increase prices at various stages of production and distribution. In 2014, according to an analysis by the Generic Pharmaceutical Association, generic drugs accounted for 88 percent of the 4.3 billion prescriptions filled in the United States. "Branded generics" on the other hand are defined by the FDA and National Health Service as "products that are (a) either novel dosage forms of off-patent products produced by a manufacturer that is not the originator of the molecule, or (b) a molecule copy of an off-patent product with a trade name." Since the company making branded generics can spend little on research and development, it is able to spend on marketing alone, thus earning higher profits and driving costs down. For example, the largest revenues of Ranbaxy, now owned by Sun Pharma, came from branded generics.

== Nomenclature ==
Generic drug names are constructed using standardized affixes that distinguish drugs between and within classes and suggest their action.

== Economics ==
When a pharmaceutical company first markets a drug, it is usually under a patent that, until it expires, the company can use to exclude competitors by suing them for patent infringement. Pharmaceutical companies that develop new drugs generally only invest in drug candidates with strong patent protection as a strategy to recoup their costs of drug development (including the costs of the drug candidates that fail) and to make a profit. The average cost to a brand-name company of discovering, testing, and obtaining regulatory approval for a new drug, with a new chemical entity, was estimated to be as much as US$800 million in 2003 and US$2.6 billion in 2014. Drug companies that bring new products have several product line extension strategies they use to extend their exclusivity, some of which are seen as gaming the system and labeled "evergreening" by critics, but at some point there is no patent protection available. For as long as a drug patent lasts, a brand-name company enjoys a period of market exclusivity, or monopoly, in which the company is able to set the price of the drug at a level that maximizes profit. This profit often greatly exceeds the development and production costs of the drug, allowing the company to offset the cost of research and development of other drugs that are not profitable or do not pass clinical trials. The impact of loss of patent exclusivity on pharmaceutical products varies significantly across different product classes (e.g., biologics vs. small molecules), largely due to regulatory, legal and manufacturing hurdles associated with such products. Indeed, the greater degree of 'brand-brand' competitive dynamics seen in the biologics and complex generics space allows manufacturers of originators to better protect market share following loss of patent exclusivity.

Large pharmaceutical companies often spend millions protecting their patents from generic competition. Apart from litigation, they may reformulate a drug or license a subsidiary (or another company) to sell generics under the original patent. Generics sold under license from the patent holder are known as authorized generics. Generic drugs are usually sold for significantly lower prices than their branded equivalents and at lower profit margins. One reason for this is that competition increases among producers when a drug is no longer protected by patents. Generic companies incur fewer costs in creating generic drugs—only the cost of manufacturing, without the costs of drug discovery and drug development—and are therefore able to maintain profitability at a lower price. The prices are often low enough for users in less-prosperous countries to afford them. Generic drug companies may also receive the benefit of the previous marketing efforts of the brand-name company, including advertising, presentations by drug representatives, and distribution of free samples. Many drugs introduced by generic manufacturers have already been on the market for a decade or more and may already be well known to patients and providers, although often under their branded name.

India is a leading country in the world's generic drugs market, exporting US$20.0 billion worth of drugs in the 2019–20 (April–March) year. India exports generic drugs to the United States and the European Union. Also according to the market research community the Global Generic Drugs Market was evaluated US$465.96 million in 2021 and is expected to rise with a CAGR of 5.5% from 2022–2028 during the forecast period. In the United Kingdom, generic drug pricing is controlled by the government's reimbursement rate. The price paid by pharmacists and doctors is determined mainly by the number of license holders, the sales value of the original brand, and the ease of manufacture. A typical price decay graph will show a "scalloped" curve, which usually starts at the brand-name price on the day of generic launch and then falls as competition intensifies. After some years, the graph typically flattens out at approximately 20% of the original brand price. In about 20% of cases, the price "bounces": Some license holders withdraw from the market when the selling price dips below their cost of goods, and the price then rises for a while until the license holders re-enter the market with new stock. The NHS spent about £4.3 billion on generic medicines in 2016–17. In 2012, 84 percent of prescriptions in the US were filled with generic drugs, and in 2014, the use of generic drugs in the United States led to US$254 billion in health care savings.

In the mid-2010s the generics industry began transitioning to the end of an era of giant patent cliffs in the pharmaceutical industry; patented drugs with sales of around US$28 billion were set to come off patent in 2018, but in 2019 only about US$10 billion in revenue was set to open for competition, and less the next year. Companies in the industry have responded with consolidation or turning to try to generate new drugs. Most developed nations require generic drug manufacturers to prove that their formulations are bioequivalent to their brand-name counterparts. Bioequivalence does not mean generic drugs must be exactly the same as the brand-name product ("pharmaceutical equivalent"). Chemical differences may exist; a different salt or ester may be used, for instance. Different inactive ingredients means that the generic may look different from the originator brand; however, the therapeutic effect of the drug must be the same ("pharmaceutical alternative"). Most small molecule drugs are accepted as bioequivalent if their pharmacokinetic parameters of area under the curve (AUC) and maximum concentration (C_{max}) are within a 90% confidence interval of 80–125%; most approved generics in the US are well within this limit. For more complex products—such as inhalers, patch delivery systems, liposomal preparations, or biosimilar drugs—demonstrating pharmacodynamic or clinical equivalence is more challenging.

=== United States ===
Enacted in 1984, the Drug Price Competition and Patent Term Restoration Act, informally known as the Hatch–Waxman Act, standardized procedures for recognition of generic drugs. In 2007, the FDA launched the Generic Initiative for Value and Efficiency (GIVE): an effort to modernize and streamline the generic drug approval process, and to increase the number and variety of generic products available.

Before a company can market a generic drug, it needs to file an Abbreviated New Drug Application (ANDA) with the Food and Drug Administration, seeking to demonstrate therapeutic equivalence to a previously approved "reference-listed drug" and proving that it can manufacture the drug safely and consistently. For an ANDA to be approved, the FDA requires that the 90% confidence interval of the geometric mean test/reference ratios for the total drug exposure (represented by the area under the curve or AUC) and the maximum plasma concentration (Cmax) should fall within limits of 80–125%. (This range is part of a statistical calculation, and does not mean that generic drugs are allowed to differ from their brand-name counterparts by up to 25 percent.) The FDA evaluated 2,070 studies conducted between 1996 and 2007 that compared the absorption of brand-name and generic drugs into a person's body. The average difference in absorption between the generic and the brand-name drug was 3.5 percent, comparable to the difference between two batches of a brand-name drug. Non-innovator versions of biologic drugs, or biosimilars, require clinical trials for immunogenicity in addition to tests establishing bioequivalency. These products cannot be entirely identical because of batch-to-batch variability and their biological nature, and they are subject to extra rules.

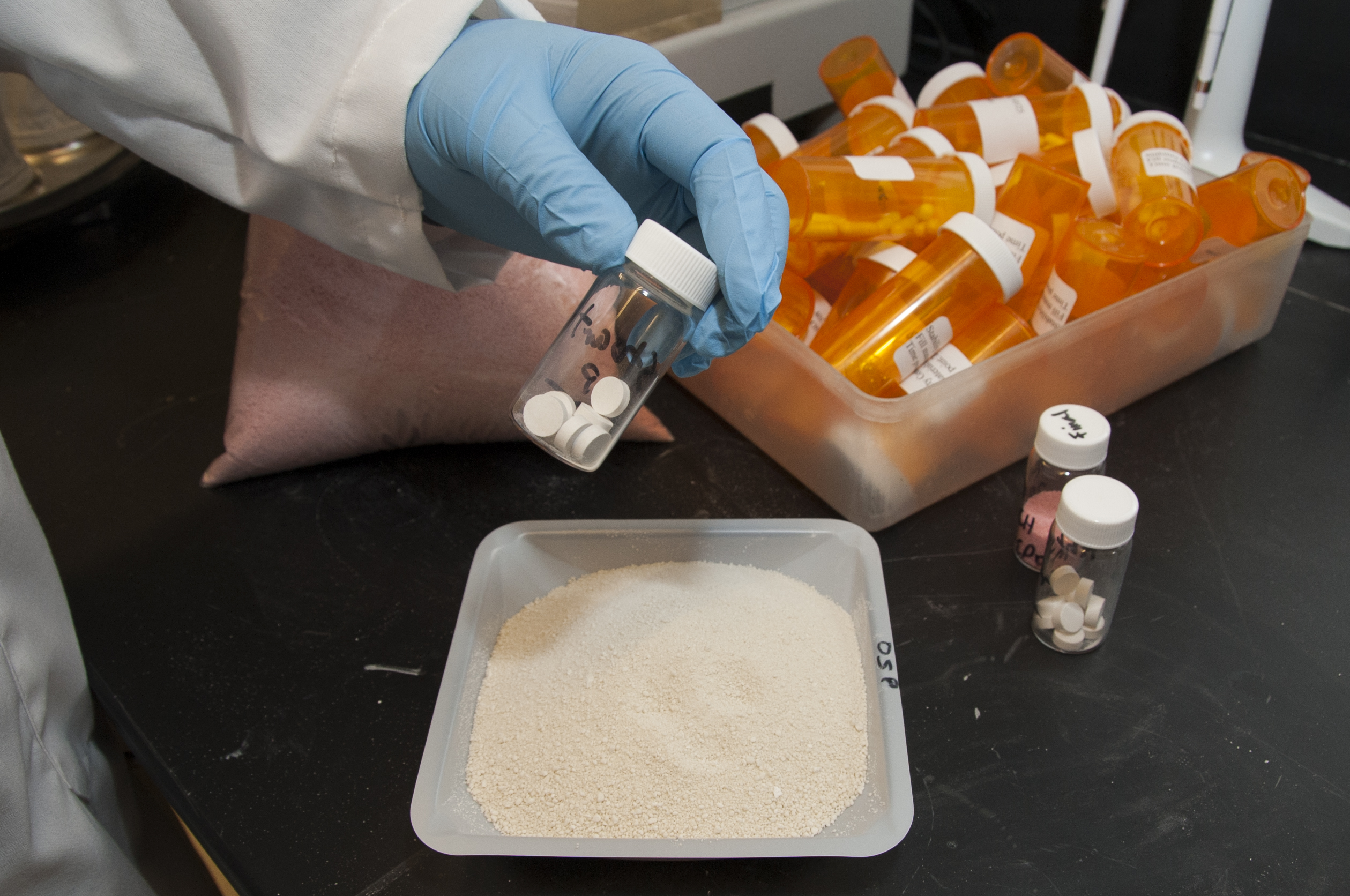
Generic drugs research

When an application is approved, the FDA adds the generic drug to its Approved Drug Products with Therapeutic Equivalence Evaluations list and annotates the list to show the equivalence between the reference-listed drug and the generic. The FDA also recognizes drugs that use the same ingredients with different bioavailability and divides them into therapeutic equivalence groups. For example, as of 2006, diltiazem hydrochloride had four equivalence groups, all using the same active ingredient, but considered equivalent only within each group.

In order to start selling a drug promptly after the patent on innovator drug expires, a generic company has to file its ANDA well before the patent expires. This puts the generic company at risk of being sued for patent infringement, since the act of filing the ANDA is considered "constructive infringement" of the patent. In order to incentivize generic companies to take that risk the Hatch-Waxman act granted a 180-day administrative exclusivity period to generic drug manufacturers who are the first to file an ANDA.

When faced with patent litigation from the drug innovator or patent holder, generic companies will often counter-sue, challenging the validity of the patent. Like any litigation between private parties, the innovator and generic companies may choose to settle the litigation. Some of these settlement agreements have been struck down by courts when they took the form of reverse payment patent settlement agreements, in which the generic company basically accepts a payment to drop the litigation, delaying the introduction of the generic product and frustrating the purpose of the Hatch–Waxman Act.

Innovator companies sometimes try to maintain some of the revenue from their drug after patents expire by allowing another company to sell an authorized generic; a 2011 FTC report found that consumers benefitted from lower costs when an authorized generic was introduced during the 180 day exclusivity period, as it created competition. Innovator companies may also present arguments to the FDA that the ANDA should not be accepted by filing an FDA citizen petition. The right of individuals or organizations to petition the federal government is guaranteed by the First Amendment to the United States Constitution. For this reason, the FDA has promulgated regulations that provide, among other things, that at any time, any "interested person" can request that the FDA "issue, amend, or revoke a regulation or order," and set forth a procedure for doing so.

==== Acceptance ====
Some generic drugs are viewed with suspicion by doctors. For example, warfarin (Coumadin) has a narrow therapeutic window and requires frequent blood tests to make sure patients do not have a subtherapeutic or a toxic level. A study performed in Ontario showed that replacing Coumadin with generic warfarin was safe, but many physicians are not comfortable with their patients taking branded generic equivalents. In some countries (for example, Australia) where a drug is prescribed under more than one brand name, doctors may choose not to allow pharmacists to substitute a brand different from the one prescribed unless the consumer requests it.

==== Fraud and quality control ====
A series of scandals around the approval of generic drugs in the late 1980s shook public confidence in generic drugs; there were several instances in which companies obtained bioequivalence data fraudulently, by using the branded drug in their tests instead of their own product, and a congressional investigation found corruption at the FDA, where employees were accepting bribes to approve some generic companies' applications and delaying or denying others.

In 2007, North Carolina Public Radio's The People's Pharmacy began reporting on consumers' complaints that generic versions of bupropion (Wellbutrin) were yielding unexpected effects. Subsequently, Impax Laboratories's 300 mg extended-release tablets, marketed by Teva Pharmaceutical Industries, were withdrawn from the US market after the FDA determined in 2012 that they were not bioequivalent.

Problems with the quality of generic drugs – especially those produced outside the United States – are widespread as of 2019. The FDA does infrequent – less than annual – inspections of production sites outside the United States. The FDA normally gives advance notice of inspections, which can lead to cover-ups of problems before inspectors arrive; inspections performed with little or no advance notice have produced evidence of serious problems at a majority of generic drug manufacturing sites in India and China. In 2025 ProPublica found that many of the factories the FDA had banned for safety concerns and substandard manufacturing after inspection were still allowed to send some drugs to the US. Manufacturing information is not directly disclosed to consumers on drugs.

==== Litigation ====
Two women, each claiming to have suffered severe medical complications from a generic version of metoclopramide, lost their Supreme Court appeal on June 23, 2011. In a 5–4 ruling in PLIVA, Inc. v. Mensing, the court held that generic companies cannot be held liable for information, or the lack of information, on the originator's label.

=== India ===
The Indian government began encouraging more drug manufacturing by Indian companies in the early 1960s, and with the Patents Act in 1970. The Patents Act removed composition patents for foods and drugs, and though it kept process patents, these were shortened to a period of five to seven years. The resulting lack of patent protection created a niche in both the Indian and global markets that Indian companies filled by reverse-engineering new processes for manufacturing low-cost drugs. The code of ethics issued by the Medical Council of India in 2002 calls for physicians to prescribe drugs by their generic names only. India is a leading country in the world's generic drugs market, with Sun Pharmaceuticals being the largest pharmaceutical company in India. Indian generics companies exported US$17.3 billion worth of drugs in the 2017–18 (April–March) year. In 1945–2017, bioequivalence studies were only required for generics of drugs that are less than four years old. Since 2017, all generic drugs of certain classes, irrespective of age, require bioequivalence to be approved.

=== China ===
Generic drug production is a large part of the pharmaceutical industry in China. Western observers have said that China lacks administrative protection for patents. However, entry to the World Trade Organization has brought a stronger patent system. China remains the largest exporter of active pharmaceutical ingredients, accounting for 40% of the world market per a 2017 estimate.

Bioequivalence studies are required for new generic drugs starting from 2016, with older drugs planned as well. In addition, in vitro dissolution behavior is required to match. Since 2018, 44 classes of drugs are exempt from testing (requiring only a dissolution check), and 13 classes only require simplified testing.

== Industry ==
As of 2021, several major companies traditionally dominate the generic drugs market, including Viatris (merger of Mylan and Upjohn), Teva, Novartis' Sandoz, and Sun Pharma. Prices in traditional generic drugs have declined and newer companies such as India-based Sun Pharma, Aurobindo Pharma, and Dr. Reddy's Laboratories, as well as Canada-based Apotex, have taken market share, which has led to a focus on biosimilars. Many generic drug makers practice dual-track production in which lower quality control standards are used when manufacturing medications for markets with less regulation. This practice can yield drugs with sub-standard doses that raise the risk of developing antibiotic-resistant bacteria.

== See also ==
- Anti-Counterfeiting Trade Agreement#Criminalising generic medicine (ACTA)
- Bayh–Dole Act
- Generic brand
- Generic pharmaceutical price decay
- International Nonproprietary Name
- Inverse benefit law
- Medicines Patent Pool
- Me-too compound
- Prescription costs
- Research exemption
- SOPA#Protection against counterfeit drugs
- Transatlantic Trade and Investment Partnership
