= List of members of the National Academy of Sciences (animal, nutritional and applied microbial sciences) =

This list is a subsection of the List of members of the National Academy of Sciences, which includes members and international members of the United States National Academy of Sciences, living and deceased, each affiliated with one of the academy's disciplinary sections. Members are listed under their primary section, and each entry gives the person's name, primary institution, and election year. For deceased members, the year of death is noted.

== Animal, nutritional, and applied microbial sciences ==
Name	Institution	Year
Perry Adkisson (died 2020)	Texas A&M University-College Station	1979
Serap Aksoy	Yale School of Public Health	2021
Leif Andersson	Texas A&M University-College Station	2012
Howard Bachrach (died 2008)	United States Department of Agriculture	1982
Amy L. Baker	United States Department of Agriculture	2025
David H. Baker (died 2009)	University of Illinois at Urbana–Champaign	2005
Ransom Baldwin (died 2007)	University of California, Davis	1993
Marisa Bartolomei	Perelman School of Medicine at the University of Pennsylvania	2021
Dale Bauman	Cornell University	1988
Barry Beaty	Colorado State University	2001
Stanley D. Beck (died 1997)	University of Wisconsin–Madison	1988
Joan W. Bennett	Tulane University	2005
Nora J. Besansky	University of Notre Dame	2020
Stephen Beverley	Washington University School of Medicine	2013
William Bowers (died 2021)	University of Arizona	1994
Ricardo Bressani (died 2015)	Universidad del Valle de Guatemala	1978
Marvin P. Bryant (died 2000)	University of Illinois Urbana-Champaign	1987
William C. Campbell	Drew University	2002
John Casida (died 2018)	University of California, Berkeley	1991
Flaminia Catteruccia	Harvard T.H. Chan School of Public Health	2024
Kelly Chibale	University of Cape Town	2025
Robert J. Cousins	University of Florida	2000
George Brownlee Craig Jr. (died 1995)	University of Notre Dame	1983
Roy Curtiss	University of Florida	2001
William J. Darby (died 2001)	Vanderbilt University School of Medicine	1972
George K. Davis (died 2004)	University of Florida	1976
Wanderley de Souza	Federal University of Rio de Janeiro	2022
Arnold Demain (died 2020)	Drew University	1994
David Denlinger	Ohio State University	2004
Roy Doi (died 2017)	University of California, Davis	2006
Jitender Dubey	U.S. Department of Agriculture	2010
Luis Enjuanes	Spanish National Research Council	2021
John Eppig	The Jackson Laboratory	2011
Tibor Farkas (died 2003)	Hungarian Academy of Sciences	1989
Lajos Ferenczy (died 2004)	University of Szeged	2002
Neal First (died 2014)	University of Wisconsin–Madison	1989
Pamela Fraker	Michigan State University	2007
George F. Gao	Chinese Academy of Sciences	2019
Vadim N. Gladyshev	Harvard Medical School	2021
Daniel E. Goldberg	Washington University School of Medicine	2022
Jack Gorski (died 2006)	University of Wisconsin–Madison	1993
Fred Gould	North Carolina State University	2011
Jenny Graves	La Trobe University	2019
John Halver (died 2012)	University of Washington	1978
Bruce Hammock (died 2026)	University of California, Davis	1999
Jo Handelsman	University of Wisconsin–Madison	2023
Caroline Harwood	University of Washington	2009
D. Mark Hegsted (died 2009)	Harvard University	1973
Janet Hemingway	Liverpool School of Tropical Medicine	2010
Hans Herren	Millennium Institute	1998
John Hildebrand	University of Arizona	2007
Ralph Holman (died 2012)	University of Minnesota, Minneapolis	1981
Edward Hoover (died 2023)	Colorado State University	2014
Lonnie Ingram (died 2020)	University of Florida	2001
Anthony James	University of California, Irvine	2006
Holger Jannasch (died 1998)	Woods Hole Oceanographic Institution	1995
Patricia J. Johnson	David Geffen School of Medicine at UCLA	2019
Le Kang	Chinese Academy of Sciences	2021
Yoshihiro Kawaoka	University of Wisconsin–Madison	2013
Charles Glen King (died 1988)	University of Chicago	1951
T. Kent Kirk (died 2025)	United States Forest Service	1988
Marion Koopmans	Erasmus University Rotterdam	2024
John H. Law	University of Arizona	1992
Walter Leal	University of California, Davis	2024
A. Starker Leopold (died 1983)	University of California, Berkeley	1970
Harris Lewin	Arizona State University	2012
James C. Liao	Academia Sinica	2015
Mary Lidstrom	University of Washington	2013
Haifan Lin	Yale School of Medicine	2018
Kerstin Lindblad-Toh	Uppsala University	2020
Julius Lukeš	Czech Academy of Sciences	2024
Clement Markert (died 1999)	North Carolina State University	1967
Martin Matzuk	Baylor College of Medicine	2014
Xiang-Jin Meng	Virginia Polytechnic Institute and State University	2016
Alison Mercer	University of Otago	2022
Edwin T. Mertz (died 1999)	Purdue University	1975
Joachim Messing (died 2019)	Rutgers University	2015
Robert L. Metcalf (died 1998)	University of Illinois Urbana-Champaign	1967
Janice Miller	U.S. Department of Agriculture	1999
Harley Moon (died 2018)	Iowa State University	1991
Kathryn Moore	New York University Grossman School of Medicine	2021
Joseph Mougous	Yale University	2022
Hamish Munro (died 1994)	Tufts University	1974
William J. Murphy	Texas A&M University	2024
Diane O'Brien	University of Alaska Fairbanks	2024
Stephen J. O'Brien	Nova Southeastern University	2018
Satoshi Omura	Kitasato Institute	1999
Colin Parrish	Cornell University	2023
Daniel R. Pérez	University of Georgia	2025
Margaret A. Phillips	University of Texas Southwestern Medical Center	2021
John A. Pickett	Cardiff University	2014
E.J. Christopher Polge (died 2006)	University of Cambridge	1997
Andrew M. Prentice	London School of Hygiene & Tropical Medicine	2023
Alexander Raikhel	University of California, Riverside	2009
Vulimiri Ramalingaswami (died 2001)	All India Institutes of Medical Sciences	1973
Jose M. Ribeiro	National Institutes of Health	2025
Lynn Riddiford	University of Washington	2010
Yasuko Rikihisa	Ohio State University	2012
R. Michael Roberts	University of Missouri	1996
Wendell L. Roelofs	Cornell University	1985
A. Catharine Ross	Texas A&M University-College Station	2003
David Sacks	National Institutes of Health	2025
Linda Saif	Ohio State University	2003
Glenn W. Salisbury (died 1994)	University of Illinois Urbana-Champaign	1974
Nevin Scrimshaw (died 2013)	United Nations University	1971
George Seidel (died 2021)	Colorado State University	1992
L. David Sibley	Washington University School of Medicine	2017
Robert Silverstein (died 2007)	State University of New York College of Environmental Science and Forestry	2000
George P. Smith	University of Missouri	2020
Ray F. Smith (died 1999)	University of California, Berkeley	1981
Dominique Soldati-Favre	University of Geneva	2024
John Speakman	Chinese Academy of Sciences	2020
Thomas E. Spencer	University of Missouri	2019
Gregory Stephanopoulos	Massachusetts Institute of Technology	2023
Patrick J. Stover	Florida State University	2016
Michael Strand	University of Georgia	2017
Max Summers	Texas A&M University-College Station	1989
John Suttie (died 2020)	University of Wisconsin–Madison	1996
Bruce Tabashnik	University of Arizona	2023
Andrzej Tarkowski (died 2016)	Warsaw University	2003
James Thomson	Morgridge Institute for Research	2008
Baldwyn Torto	International Centre of Insect Physiology and Ecology	2023
James W. Truman	University of Washington	2022
James Tumlinson (died 2022)	Pennsylvania State University	1997
Aree Valyasevi (died 2022)	Mahidol University	1993
Sue VandeWoude	Colorado State University	2019
Robert Wasserman (died 2018)	Cornell University	1980
Doug Waterhouse (died 2000)	CSIRO	1983
John Waterlow (died 2010)	University of London	1992
Ian Wilmut (died 2023)	Roslin Institute	2004
Richard Witter	U.S. Department of Agriculture	1998
James Womack (died 2023)	Texas A&M University-College Station	1999
H. Boyd Woodruff (died 2017)	Soil Microbiology Associates	1998
Ryuzo Yanagimachi (died 2023)	University of Hawaii at Manoa	2001
Yang Huanming	BGI Group	2014
Tilahun Yilma	University of California, Davis School of Medicine	2004
Vernon R. Young (died 2004)	Massachusetts Institute of Technology	1990
Qijing Zhang	Iowa State University	2022
