= James W. Truman =

American chronobiologist

James "Jim" W. Truman
- Born: Akron, Ohio, U.S.
- Education: University of Notre Dame, Harvard University
- Known for: Circadian rhythms in silkmoth eclosion
- Spouse: Lynn Riddiford
- Scientific career
- Fields: Entomology, neurobiology, chronobiology, endocrinology
- Workplaces: University of Washington, Howard Hughes Medical Institute's Janelia Research Campus
- Thesis: The control of ecdysis in silkmoths (1970)
- Doctoral advisor: Lynn Riddiford
- Website: www.biology.washington.edu/people/profile/james-w-truman

James "Jim" William Truman is an American chronobiologist known for his seminal research on circadian rhythms in silkmoth (Saturniidae) eclosion, particularly the restoration of rhythm and phase following brain transplantation. He is a professor emeritus at the University of Washington and a former senior fellow at Howard Hughes Medical Institution Janelia Research Campus.

== Background ==
Truman was introduced to biological research as an undergraduate at the University of Notre Dame in the laboratory of George B. Craig. He was intrigued by Craig's discoveries relating to the hormonal regulation of mosquito mating behavior. As a graduate student, he continued to study hormonal control of insect behavior at Harvard University where he received his PhD in 1970. His doctoral advisor was Lynn Riddiford, whom he later married. He began his research in chronobiology as a junior fellow at Harvard University and continued this work when he established his own laboratory in 1973 at the University of Washington.

Truman took three sabbaticals from the University of Washington. The first, in 1986, was to Cambridge University, where he studied Drosophila neurobiology under Mike Bate. In the second half of this sabbatical he then traveled to Kenya, where he spent time researching tsetse fly development. On his second sabbatical in 1993, Truman traveled to the Australian National University in Canberra, Australia, to research grasshopper metamorphosis hormones with Eldon Ball. In his final sabbatical, he returned to Cambridge University to study evolutionary developmental biology with Michael Akam.

In 2007, after 34 years at University of Washington, Truman retired from the university in order to study insect neuronal stem cells as a group leader at the Howard Hughes Medical Institute's Janelia Research Campus, in Ashburn, Virginia. In 2016, he retired from the Howard Hughes Medical Institute and returned to the University of Washington to pursue research at Friday Harbor Laboratories. His current research focuses on the development and evolution of insect and crustacean nervous systems.

== Research contributions ==
=== Discovery of the eclosion hormone ===
While still in graduate school at Harvard, Truman identified an insect neurohormone now known as the eclosion hormone, which mediates moth ecdysis. He demonstrated that injecting eclosion hormone (EH) into moths elicits a stereotyped sequence of ecdysis behaviors. In future studies of silkmoth eclosion, Truman went on to confirm the role of EH in mediating ecdysis. Later studies also implicated a brain-based circadian clock as the regulator controlling the release of EH.

=== Studies of silkmoth eclosion ===
As a junior fellow in the Harvard Society of Fellows, Truman studied the underlying mechanisms of silkmoth eclosion, mainly focusing on the role of the circadian clock in driving time of day rhythms in eclosion. Truman demonstrated that eclosion rhythms persist in Hyalophora cecropia moths that have had their compound eyes, corpora cardiaca, and corpora allata surgically removed. Eclosion rhythms were only abolished with the removal of the brain, indicating that the circadian clock is located within the brain. Further experiments involving brain transplantation and selective illumination of different parts of the body revealed that the circadian photoreceptors, which are responsible for receiving light information to entrain the circadian clock, are also located in the brain.

More brain transplant experiments in Hyalophora cecropia and Antheraea pernyi showed that both entrained and free-running eclosion rhythms can be rescued in debrained moths that have had brains transplanted into their abdomens. These restored eclosion rhythms in the debrained moths matched in phase angle with the eclosion rhythms observed in the donor moths prior to brain transplantation. These results confirmed Truman's previous findings that the circadian clock is located within the brain and that the factor mediating eclosion behavior is hormonal. Similar experiments focusing on the role of the circadian clock in regulating flight rhythms confirmed that extraretinal photoreceptors in the brain are responsible for entraining a brain-based circadian clock.

=== Further studies on eclosion in Drosophila ===
In 2008, Truman went on to discover that eclosion rhythms, which are mediated by the circadian release of the neurohormone EH, can be masked. In chronobiology, masking refers to the apparent coupling of an observable biological rhythm with an external environmental time cue, without affecting the underlying circadian clock that mediates the observed rhythm. Truman and colleagues observed increased eclosion in adult Drosophila flies immediately following a lights-on signal, which lead to their subsequent discovery that light triggers rapid eclosion in Drosophila on the condition that there was prior EH release. This occurs through the convergence of parallel neurosecretory pathways, both of which are activated by EH. These two EH activated pathways oppose each other; one is an excitatory behavioral pathway and one is inhibitory. Truman and colleagues found that the presence of light can result in the inhibition of the inhibitory pathway, leading to a greater net effect of the excitatory pathway. This light-mediated response promotes more rapid Drosophila eclosion and as a result masks the circadian eclosion rhythms. Further work with Drosophila resulted in the finding that masking of circadian eclosion rhythms can also occur through the inhibition of eclosion. In 2008, Truman and colleagues found that expression of the light chain of tetanus toxin (UAS-TNT) can affect the release of EH from EH releasing cells in the fly brain. This inhibition of EH release results in the inhibition of eclosion—pointing to another way to mask circadian eclosion in Drosophila.

=== Studies on neuronal remodeling during insect metamorphosis ===
Some of Truman's most influential work outside of chronobiology involves how hormones alter the nervous system to influence behavior in insect models. Notably, Truman and colleagues have studied neuronal remodeling during insect metamorphosis. Their model organism, the hornworm moth (Manduca sexta), was chosen because it has a well-studied endocrinology and its large size allows for the use of standard electrophysiological and neuroanatomical techniques. In 1986, Truman found that accompanying the bodily changes of the hornworm moth was an extensive reorganization of the moth's central nervous system (CNS). Among many changes was the finding that upon onset of metamorphosis, vast cell death sweeps through nests of larvae that are at the end of larval life. These nest cells were previously in an arrested state, but after this metamorphosis-induced cell death, the surviving nest cells can then differentiate. These cells become functional adult CNS neurons.

=== Discoveries on the insect nervous system ===
Following his interest in the evolution of metamorphosis, Truman began conducting research on the evolution of the insect nervous system at the Janelia Research Campus. Working in Drosophila model systems, he corroborated his findings from his work in Manduca sexta and discovered that as the adult insect CNS develops during metamorphosis, neuronal stem cells (neuroblasts) differentiate based on specific, highly conserved lineages. He also identified that the peripheral nervous system and motor neurons develop during the embryonic stage and are only partially remodeled during metamorphosis. Furthermore, Truman and his colleagues identified that neuroblasts in the ventral nerve cord originate specific neuronal lineages extending to different regions of the insect body, and that these neuroblasts are characterized by position, size, and manner in which they divide. Currently, Truman and his colleagues at the University of Washington are focusing on characterizing these neuronal lineages in the Drosophila CNS.

== Awards ==
- Newcomb Cleveland Prize (1970)
- John Simon Guggenheim Fellowship (1986)
- ESA Founders' Memorial Award (1989)
- The Wigglesworth Memorial Lecture and Award (2008)
- Elected member of the American Academy of Arts and Sciences (2009)
- Elected member of the National Academy of Sciences (2022)

== Notable publications ==
- Truman, James W (1971). "Physiology of Insect Ecdysis: I. The Eclosion Behaviour of Saturniid Moths and Its Hormonal Release". Journal of Experimental Biology. 54 (3): 805–814. doi:10.1242/jeb.54.3.805.
- Booker, R.; Truman, J. W. (1987). "Postembryonic Neurogenesis in the CNS of the Tobacco Hornworm, Manduca Sexta. I. Neuroblast Arrays and the Fate of Their Progeny during Metamorphosis". The Journal of Comparative Neurology. 255 (4): 548–59. doi:10.1002/cne.902550407. PMID 3819030. S2CID 22566863.
- Truman, James W (1972). "Physiology of Insect Rhythms: The Silkmoth Brain as the Location of the Biological Clock Controlling Eclosion". Journal of Comparative Physiology. 81 (1): 99–114. doi:10.1007/BF00693553. S2CID 43110913.
- McNabb, S. L.; Truman, J. W. (2008). "Light and peptidergic eclosion hormone neurons stimulate a rapid eclosion response that masks circadian emergence in Drosophila". The Journal of Experimental Biology. 211 (14): 2263–74. doi:10.1242/jeb.015818. PMC 2760273. PMID 18587121.
- Truman, James W.; Riddiford, Lynn M. (1999). "The origins of insect metamorphosis". Nature. 401 (6752): 447–452. doi:10.1038/46737. PMID 10519548. S2CID 4327078.
- Schubiger, Margrit; et al. (1998). "Drosophila EcR-B ecdysone receptor isoforms are required for larval molting and for neuron remodeling during metamorphosis". Development. 125 (11): 2053–62. doi:10.1242/dev.125.11.2053. PMID 9570770.
- Truman, James W.; Riddiford, Lynn M. (2002). "Endocrine insights into the evolution of metamorphosis in insects". Annual Review of Entomology. 47: 467–500. doi:10.1146/annurev.ento.47.091201.145230. PMID 11729082.
- Truman, J. W.; Schuppe, H.; Shepherd, D.; Williams, D. W. (2004). "Developmental architecture of adult-specific lineages in the ventral CNS of Drosophila". Development. 131 (20): 5167–5184. doi:10.1242/dev.01371. PMID 15459108.
- Truman, J. W. (1990). "Metamorphosis of the central nervous system of Drosophila". Journal of Neurobiology. 21 (7): 1072–1084. doi:10.1002/neu.480210711. PMID 1979610.
- Truman, J. W.; Bate, M. (1988). "Spatial and temporal patterns of neurogenesis in the central nervous system of Drosophila melanogaster". Developmental Biology. 125 (1): 145–157. doi:10.1016/0012-1606(88)90067-x. PMID 3119399.
