= Julia Beatty =

British-Australian veterinary researcher

- Born: London
- Occupation: Veterinary researcher

Julia Beatty is a British-Australian veterinary researcher specialising in feline medicine clinical research and educating students of veterinary science.

== Education ==
Born in London, Beatty attended the Royal Veterinary College, University of London, graduating with a Bachelor of Veterinary Medicine in 1989. Captivated by cats from an early age, she obtained a PhD on the immune response to feline immunodeficiency virus from Oswald Jarrett's laboratory at the University of Glasgow in 1994. Beatty is a Royal College of Veterinary Surgeons recognised clinical specialist in feline medicine. She has worked in both primary and referral veterinary hospitals and is currently Professor of Feline Medicine at the University of Sydney School of Veterinary Science.

== Career ==
Beatty is best known for her research on viral diseases of cats, particularly viral causes of cancer. She initiated a collaboration with Sue VandeWoude and Ryan Troyer at Colorado State University that led to the discovery, jointly, of the first gammaherpesvirus of domestic cats, Felis catus gammaherpesvirus 1. Her research into this virus and other infectious diseases of small animals at the University of Sydney aims to improve the lives of pets and people.

Beatty was awarded the Australian Small Animal Veterinary Association's Award for Scientific Excellence in 2014 and a University of Sydney Thompson Fellowship in 2012. Her research has been funded by the Wellcome Trust, UK and the Morris Animal Foundation, US. She has authored over 100 scientific publications and book chapters and has had over 50 abstract presentations at international conferences. She is a Fellow and past-President of the Feline Chapter of the Australia and New Zealand College of Veterinary Scientists. She is Associate Editor for Veterinary Medicine and Science peer-reviewed journal, published by Wiley.

Beatty is currently a Feline Internal Medicine Specialist at the Valentine Charlton Cat Centre, University Veterinary Teaching Hospital Sydney, where she performs clinical research into diseases of small animals. In her role as Professor, she is a lecturer in undergraduate small animal medicine, supervisor of final year veterinary student clinical rotations and post-graduate Masters and PhD students.
