= Brian Perry (veterinary surgeon) =

British veterinary surgeon and epidemiologist

Brian Perry OBE, BVM&S, DTVM, MSc, DVM&S, FRCVS
- Born: Brian Derek Perry; 11 March 1946 (age 80)
- Education: University of Edinburgh
- Awards: International Outstanding Scientist award (Consultative Group for International Agricultural Research) in 2004
- Scientific career
- Fields: Economics, Veterinary epidemiology
- Institutions: International Livestock Research Institute

Brian Derek Perry, OBE (born 11 March 1946) is a British veterinary surgeon and epidemiologist renowned for the integration of veterinary epidemiology and agricultural economics, as a tool for disease control policy and strategy development, and specialised in international agricultural development. He is an Honorary Professor at the University of Edinburgh, a visiting professor at the Nuffield Department of Clinical Medicine, University of Oxford.

== Early life and education ==
Brian Perry is from a farming family in Norfolk and was educated at Town Close School, Norwich and Wymondham College, Norfolk. He studied veterinary medicine at the Royal (Dick) School of Veterinary Medicine, University of Edinburgh and graduated as a veterinary surgeon in 1969. He later completed a Diploma in Tropical Veterinary Medicine (1971), an MSc in Tropical Veterinary Science (1975), and a Doctorate of Veterinary Medicine and Surgery (1987), all at the University of Edinburgh.

== Career ==
Brian Perry has led many international research and development projects seeking a better understanding of the dynamics, control and impacts of tropical diseases of livestock, and the roles of livestock in poverty reduction and processes of international development; he has lived and worked in UK, Ethiopia, Colombia, Zambia, USA and Kenya, and has consulted widely in many countries of Africa, Asia and Latin America. He started his international career in Ethiopia on the rinderpest control programme, undertaking surveys of disease of importance to Ethiopia’s livestock sector. He then moved to Colombia, investigating the diseases of impact to the Colombian sheep industry, particularly those affecting smallholder farmers in the Andean region. He then built a veterinary epidemiology field programme for the Food and Agriculture Organisation of the United Nations (FAO) in Zambia, investigating the constraints to the traditional livestock sector, before taking up a position at the Virginia–Maryland Regional College of Veterinary Medicine in the USA in 1982, where he initiated the epidemiology teaching and research programme at the Virginia–Maryland Regional College of Veterinary Medicine in the USA in 1982. He went on to lead the epidemiology and socioeconomics research programmes at the International Laboratory for Research on Livestock Diseases (ILRAD) and the International Livestock Research Institute (ILRI) for 20 years, where he specialised in the integration of veterinary epidemiology and agricultural economics to assess the impacts of livestock diseases and their control in low and middle income country settings. After leaving ILRI in 2007 he worked as a consultant for 10 years leading initiatives by FAO and the World Bank in which he made several analytical contributions on the role of livestock and disease control in pro-poor growth. He recently reviewed the current demands on global livestock research, and the performance of the Consultative Group for International Agricultural Research (CGIAR) in a White Paper. He has led many independent evaluations of public funding investments in agricultural development and health in different countries and regions of the world, including the Real Time Evaluation of the global programme against highly pathogenic avian influenza, run by the Food and Agriculture Organization of the United Nations (FAO)., and the impacts of foot-and-mouth disease in Uruguay.

He chaired the Scientific Advisory Board of Afrique One Aspire, a Wellcome Trust-funded African Research Consortium for Ecosystem and Population Health comprising 11 universities and research institutes for 12 years. He is an advisor to the Global Alliance for Livestock Veterinary Medicine (GALVmed)-administered AgResults Foot-and-Mouth Disease Vaccine Challenge Project. He sits on the judging panel of the Global Alliance for Livestock Veterinary Medicine (GALVmed)-administered AgResults Brucellosis vaccine prize competition. He is a member of the Management Board of the Medical Research Council (MRC)-funded International Veterinary Vaccinology Network. He is a member of the International Committee of World Horse Welfare. Brian Perry also contributes to the growth of African-led health research, providing mentorship for younger scientists and support for African capacity-building initiatives. He is an author or co-author of some 300 scientific articles in refereed journals, books and proceedings.

== Honours ==
- Fellow of the Royal College of Veterinary Surgeons (1995) for meritorious contributions to learning in the field of veterinary epidemiology
- Officer of the Order of the British Empire in the 2002 New Year Honours for services to veterinary science in developing countries
- International Outstanding Scientist Award (2004) from Consultative Group for International Agricultural Research (CGIAR)
- British Veterinary Association Trevor Blackburn Award (2012) for outstanding contributions to animal health and welfare in Africa, Asia and Latin America,
- Doctor honoris causa (2015) from the Swedish University of Agricultural Sciences (SLU)

== Personal life ==
He is married to Helena Perry (née Nyberg), and they have two daughters. Brian Perry has engaged in a wide variety of sporting and social activities, including squash, Rugby union in Colombia, windsurfing, flying aeroplanes, horse-racing, three-day eventing, polo, amateur dramatics, playing jazz, cooking, photography and painting. He has been an active polo player, and was Chairman of the Nairobi Polo Club, the Manyatta Polo Club and the Kenya Polo Association and Chief Steward of the Jockey Club of Kenya.

== Selected publications ==
- Camille M. Montalcini, Marina A. G. von Keyserlingk, Donald M. Broom, Silke Bauer, Heather Browning, Delia Grace, Michael Mendl, Tomas Norton, Brian Perry, Clive J.C. Phillips, Jonathan Rushton, Laura Scherer, Cynthia Schuck-Paim, Colette S. Vogeler, Walter Veit, Cleo Verkuijl, Thomas W. Crowther. (in submission). Contribution of animal welfare in achieving the Sustainable Development Goals; Science.
- Luis G. Arroyo, Alexandre S. Borges, John D. Baird, Brian D Perry, Yasuko Rikihisa, and Stephen E. Greiman. (in submission). Equine Neorickettsiosis: A global perspective of the natural habitat of the bacteria and clinical disease. Veterinary Microbiology, VETMIC-D-25-01049
- Perry, Brian (2025). Executive Guest Editor, One Health, IDRC-One Health (Collaborative One Health Research Initiative on Epidemics (COHRIE) Special Issue, Elsevier (in preparation).
- Tyrrell, P., Evans, L., Brehony, P., Wood, P., Karimi, R., Ole Kaelo, D., Hunter, F., Muiyuro, R., Wairimu, E., & Perry, B. (2024). Bridging the conservation and development trade-off?: A working landscape critique of a conservancy in the Maasai Mara. Ecological Solutions and Evidence, 5/3, July 2024, https://doi.org/10.1002/2688-8319.12369
- Perry, B. D., Rich, Karl M., Perez Andres M. (2023). Editorial: Challenging standards and paradigms to support animal disease prevention and control. Frontiers in Veterinary Science, 10 https://www.frontiersin.org/articles/10.3389/fvets.2023.1208023 DOI=10.3389/fvets.2023.1208023 ISSN=2297-1769
- Perry B.D., Aklilu Gebreyes Y, Hailemariam S, Legese G, Smyth K, Peters AR, Allan FK, Tegegne A. (2022). A multi-stakeholder participatory pilot study of the data demands of the future Ethiopian dairy sector. Gates Open Res. 2022 Aug 2;6:51. doi: 10.12688/gatesopenres.13594.3. PMID: 35923864; PMCID: PMC9296832.
- Grace, D. C., Diall, O., Gedge, A., Maguire, L., Newton, V., Saville, K., Wild, I., Perry, B.D. (2022). The Global Contributions of Working Equids to Sustainable Agriculture and Livelihoods in Agenda 2030. EcoHealth (2022). https://doi.org/10.1007/s10393-022-01613-8
- Perry, B.D. and Dijkman, J. T. (2021). Livestock production systems, their responses to animal source food demands, and the implications for animal health services. In: Veterinary Services in a changing world: climate change and other external factors. OIE Scientific and Technical Review, Vol. 40 (2), 40 (2), 383-394 https://doi.org/10.20506/rst.40.2.3231
- Campbell, Z., Coleman, P., Guest, A., Kushwaha, P., Ramuthivheli, T., Osebe, T., Perry, B., Salt, J. (2021). Prioritizing smallholder animal health needs in East Africa, West Africa, and South Asia using three approaches: Literature review, expert workshops, and practitioner surveys. Preventive Veterinary Medicine, 189, 105279. https://doi.org/10.1016/j.prevetmed.2021.105279
- Saville, K., Bambara, C., Marry, A., Perry, B.D. (2020). ‘Invisible livestock’ – On the central roles of working horses, donkeys and mules on the smallholder farms that feed the world
- Warimwe, G.M., Purushotham, J., Perry, B.D. et al. Tackling human and animal health threats through innovative vaccinology in Africa (2018). AAS Open Res 2018, 1:18 (doi: 10.12688/aasopenres.12877.1)
- Perry, B., Robinson, T., & Grace, D. (2018). Review: Animal health and sustainable global livestock systems. Animal, 1-10. doi:10.1017/S1751731118000630
- Perry, B. D. (2017). We must tie equine welfare to international development. Debate, Veterinary Record, 181: 600-601, doi: 10.1136/vr.j5561
- Perry, B.D. (2016). The control of East Coast fever of cattle by live parasite vaccination: A science-to-impact narrative. One Health, 2, 103–114. doi:10.1016/j.onehlt.2016.07.002
- Perry, B.D., Grace, D. G. (2015). How Growing Complexity of Consumer Choices and Drivers of Consumption Behaviour Affect Demand for Animal Source Foods. EcoHealth, 12, 703–712.
- Perry, B.D. (2015). Towards a healthier planet: Veterinary epidemiology research at the International Laboratory for Research on Animal Diseases (ILRAD) and the International Livestock Research Institute (ILRI), 1987–2014. Research Report 38. International Livestock Research Institute (ILRI), Nairobi, Kenya.
- Perry, B.D., Morton, J., Stur, W. (2014). A strategic overview of livestock research undertaken by the Consultative Group for International Agricultural Research (CGIAR) Consortium, 64 pp. Perry, B.D., Grace, D., Sones, K.R. (2011). Current drivers and future directions of global livestock disease dynamics. Proceedings of the National Academy of Sciences www.pnas.org/cgi/doi/10.1073/pnas.1012953108
- Perry, B.D., Romero, J., Lora, E. (2012). Evaluación independiente del Proyecto Regional Integrado para el Control Progresivo de la Fiebre Aftosa en Bolivia, Colombia, Ecuador, Perú y Venezuela GCP/RLA/178/SPA y GTFS/RLA/172/ITA. FAO, Rome.
- Bett, B., J. Henning, P. Abdu, I. Okike, J. Poole, J. Young, T. F. Randolph and B. D. Perry (2012). Transmission Rate and Reproductive Number of the H5N1 Highly Pathogenic Avian Influenza Virus During the December 2005 – July 2008 Epidemic in Nigeria. doi:10.1111/tbed.12003
- Perry, B.D., Bell, L., Gasana, J., Kassa, Yewubdar, Kimoto, Tsukasa, Kumsa, Tesfaye, Tripp, Robert (2011). Independent Evaluation of the Programmes and Cooperation of the Food and Agriculture Organization of the United Nations in Ethiopia, FAO Rome, 89 pp.
- Perry, B.D. and Grace, D. (2009). The impacts of livestock diseases and their control on growth and development processes that are pro-poor. Philosophical Transactions of the Royal Society, B, 364, 2643 – 2655.
- Perry, B.D. and Rich, K (2007). The poverty impacts of foot and mouth disease and the poverty reduction implications of its control. Veterinary Record, 160, 238–241.
- Perry, B.D. and Sones, K. R. (2007). Poverty reduction through animal health. Science 315, 333–334.
- Perry, B.D. and Sones, K.R. (Editors) (2007). Global Roadmap for Improving the Tools to Control Foot-and-Mouth Disease in Endemic Settings. Report of a workshop held at Agra, India, 29 November −1 December 2006, and subsequent Roadmap outputs. ILRI (International Livestock Research Institute), Nairobi, Kenya, 88 pp. and CD-ROM.
- Perry, B.D., McDermott, J.J. and Randolph, T.F. (2004). Control of infectious diseases: making appropriate decisions in different epidemiological and socio-economic conditions In: Infectious Diseases of Livestock, Volume 1, Editors J.A.W. Coetzer and R.C. Tustin, Oxford University Press, Cape Town, 178–224.
- Perry, B.D., Gleeson, L.J., Khounsey, S., Bounema, P., Blacksell, S. (2002). The dynamics and impact of foot and mouth disease in smallholder farming systems in South East Asia: a case study in the Lao Peoples Democratic Republic. OIE Scientific and Technical Revue, 21, 663–673.
- Perry, B.D., Randolph, T.F., McDermott, J.J., Sones, K.R. and Thornton, P.K. (2002). Investing in Animal Health Research to Alleviate Poverty. International Livestock Research Institute (ILRI), Nairobi, Kenya, 140 pp plus CD-ROM.
- Perry, B.D., McDermott, J.J. and Randolph, T.F. (2001). Can epidemiology and economics make a meaningful contribution to national animal disease control? Preventive Veterinary Medicine, 48, 231–260.
- Perry, B.D., (Editor), (1999). The economics of animal disease control. OIE Scientific and Technical Revue, Special Edition, 18, (2), 561 pp.
- Norval, R.A.I., Perry, B.D. and Young, A.S. (1992). The Epidemiology of Theileriosis in Africa. Academic Press, London, 481 pp.
