= Leal =

Leal can refer to:

== People ==
- Abel Leal (1940–2019), Colombian baseball player
- Agapito Leal (1938-2023), American actor, known for Into the Homeland
- Alicia Leal (born 1957), Cuban visual artist
- Carlos Leal (born 1969), Swiss rapper and actor
- Cassiano Leal (born 1971), Brazilian freestyle swimmer
- Daniel Alsina Leal (born 1988), Spanish chess grandmaster
- Danny Leal (fl. 2005–present), lead singer of Upon A Burning Body
- DeMarvin Leal (born 2000), American football player
- Ernesto Leal (1945–2005), Nicaraguan politician
- Eugenio Leal (born 1954), Spanish footballer
- Fernando Leal Fonseca (born 1981), Brazilian footballer
- Fernando Leal (artist) (1896–1964), Mexican painter
- Francisco Aguilar y Leal (1776–1840), soldier, Spanish merchant and one of the main leaders of Uruguayan independence
- Hugo Leal (footballer) (born 1980), Portuguese footballer
- Hugo Leal (politician) (born 1962), Brazilian politician
- Ivonne Leal (born 1966), Cuban javelin thrower
- Jaime Pardo Leal (1941–1987), Colombian lawyer, union leader and politician
- Janine Leal (born 1976), Venezuelan television presenter and model
- Jeff Leal (born 1954), Canadian politician
- John L. Leal (1858–1914), American physician and water treatment expert
- José Leal (born 1965), Portuguese footballer
- Juan Leal (1676–1742/43), Spanish settler and politician
- Juan de Valdés Leal (1622–1690), Spanish painter and etcher
- L. Gary Leal (born 1943), American chemical engineer and professor
- Leandra Leal (born 1982), Brazilian actress
- Luis Leal (writer) (1907–2010), Mexican-American writer and literary critic
- Luis Leal (baseball) (born 1957), Venezuelan baseball pitcher
- Ninibeth Leal (born 1971), Venezuelan Miss World
- Pedro Leal (footballer) (born 1989), Costa Rican football player
- Pedro Leal (rugby union) (born 1984), Portuguese rugby player
- Rayssa Leal (born 2008), Brazilian skateboarder
- Sergio Leal (born 1982), Uruguayan footballer
- Sharon Leal (born 1972), American actress
- Walter Leal (born 1954), Brazilian-born American biochemist
- Yoandy Leal (born 1988), Cuban-Brazilian volleyball player

== Places ==
- Leal, North Dakota, United States, a city
- Lihula (German: Leal), Estonia, a town

== LEAL ==
- ICAO airport code of Alicante–Elche Miguel Hernández Airport, Elche, Spain
- Lenguaje Algorítmico, a programming language for the CID-201 computer
