= Town Close School =

Location
- Ipswich Road; Norwich, NR2 2LR; England; 52.6188°N 1.2835°E

Information
- Type: Private
- Established: 1931
- Department for Education URN: 121237 Tables
- Headmaster: Nicholas Tiley-Nunn
- Gender: Co-educational
- Age: 3 to 13
- Enrollment: 450
- Website: www.townclose.com

Town Close School, established in 1932, is a co-educational independent preparatory school located in Norwich, England.

== Playing field ==
The school's playing field is located on Newmarket Road. Norwich City's first home ground was located here, with the club playing at the ground from their foundation in 1902 until they relocated to "The Nest" on Rosary Road in 1908. A record attendance of 10,366 was set at Newmarket Road against The Wednesday in a second round FA Cup match in 1908.

Following World War II, Norwich CEYMS played at Newmarket Road.

== Notable former pupils ==
- Richard Alexander - England hockey international
- Brian Perry - veterinary surgeon and epidemiologist
- Peter Jarrold
- Robert Stern - philosopher
