= Monica Asman =

American Catholic nun and research scientist (1920–2016)

Sister Monica Asman
- Born: September 14, 1920; Germany
- Died: April 5, 2016 (aged 95)
- Education: University of Notre Dame
- Known for: mosquito genetics; male-sterile mosquitoes
- Scientific career
- Workplaces: Santa Clara University; University of California, Berkeley
- Thesis: Cytogenetic and developmental effects of gamma radiation on Aedes aegypti (L) (1966)
- Doctoral advisor: George B. Craig

Sister Monica Asman (September 14, 1920 – April 5, 2016) was an American Catholic nun and research scientist at University of California, Berkeley. She applied genetic methods to mosquitoes with the aim of reducing their ability to carry viruses that can cause disease in humans and animals, and to reduce the size of mosquito populations. She also opened the St. Francis Center of Redwood City for the poor.

== Education and personal life ==
Monica Asman was born in Germany on September 14, 1920. She was brought up in America and in 1940 she joined the Sisters of St. Francis of Penance and Christian Charity. She graduated from University of Notre Dame in 1966 with a PhD degree. In 1987 she founded the St. Francis Center for poor people in Redwood City, California. In 2004 she retired to a religious residence. She died April 5, 2016.

== Career ==
As well as her religious vocation, Asman had a successful career as a science teacher and researcher. Her reason for becoming a scientist was probably the need for science teachers at Catholic schools. Between 1944 and 1962 Asman worked as a teacher in schools run by her religious order. Making a significant change, she then began scientific research supervised by George B. Craig at the University of Notre Dame. He led a research group that was beginning to apply genetics to the mosquito Aedes aegypti. Asman's project provided her with a training in genetics and the use of cobalt-60 to induce mutations. This required evaluation of the effects of radiation as the mosquito developed from egg to adult to identify the level of radiation that would cause mutations without killing all the mosquitoes. After completing her doctorate, her religious order moved her to Mount Alverno Center in Redwood City, California with the objective of returning to teaching. She was appointed as an instructor in the Biology Department at Santa Clara University from 1966 until 1971. However, she made contact with the parasitology department at University of California, Berkeley, specifically the arbovirus research group led by William C. Reeves in order to continue genetics research. She began working with them, adding her skill and knowledge of genetics to their research, initially unpaid. From 1968 until 1988 she was an Associate Research Entomologist in the University of California, Berkeley.

At the suggestion of the Berkeley research group, she changed from A. aegypti to the mosquito species Culex tarsalis and A. sierrensis because they were more important disease vectors in the California region. She transferred the methods she had learnt to these species and applied them in projects aiming to reduce the fertility or disease transmission of these mosquitoes. The mosquitoes were tested in controlled outdoor environments as well as in the laboratory. Some genetically altered mosquitoes were also released into the wild. The research demonstrated that there were genetic determinants for how likely mosquitoes were to carry the viruses that caused disease in humans and animals. Part of the funding for this research came from the National Institute of Allergy and Infectious Diseases and the United States Army Medical Research and Development Command.

== Publications ==
Asman was the author or co-author of over 50 scientific publications. These included:

- S. M. Asman, M. M. Milby, W. C. Reeves. (1990) Genetics of Culex tarsalis. In: Reeves, W. C., Epidemiology and Control of Mosquito-borne Arboviruses in California. Calif. Mosq. Vector Control Assocn., pp. 330–356.
- Asman SM, McDonald PT and T. Prout. (1981) Field studies of genetic control systems for mosquitoes. Annual Review of Entomology 26 289–318
- Asman SM and HA Terwedow. (1980) Initial studies on the genetics of Aedes sierrensis. Mosquito News 40 224–226.
- Asman SM, Nelson RL, McDonald P, Milby M, Reeves W, White KD, et al. (1979) Pilot release of sex-linked multiple translocation into a Culex tarsalis field population in Kern County, California [Biological control]. Mosq News. 39 248–258.
- James L. Hardy, George Apperson, S. Monica Asman, and William C. Reeves. (1978) Selection of a strain of Culex tarsalis highly resistant to infection following ingestion of western equine encephalomyelitis virus. J. Heredity 27 313–321
- McDonald PT, Asman SM, Terwedow HA. (1978) Sex-linked translocations in Culex tarsalis: chromosome—linkage group correlation and segregation patterns. J Hered. 69 304–310.
- Asman, M and KS Rai (1972) Developmental effects of ionising radiation in Aedes egypti. J. Med Entomol. 9 468–478
- Rai, KS, McDonald, PT and SM Asman (1970) Cytogenetics of two radiation-induced sex-linked translocations in the yellow-fever mosquito Aedes aegypti. Genetics 66 635-651
