= Pathogens and Global Health =

- Discipline: Epidemiology
- Language: English
- Edited by: Andrea Crisanti

Publication details
- Former names: Annals of Tropical Medicine and Parasitology
- History: 1906–present
- Publisher: Taylor & Francis
- Impact factor: 3.4 (2022)

Standard abbreviations
- ISO 4: Pathog. Glob. Health

Indexing
- Pathogens and Global Health
- ISSN: 2047-7724 (print); 2047-7732 (web)
- Annals of Tropical Medicine and Parasitology
- CODEN: ATMPA2
- ISSN: 0003-4983 (print); 1364-8594 (web)

Links
- Journal homepage

Pathogens and Global Health is a peer-reviewed medical journal published by Taylor & Francis. It covers tropical diseases, including their microbiology, epidemiology and molecular biology, as well as medical entomology, HIV/AIDS, malaria, and tuberculosis. The editor-in-chief is Andrea Crisanti (Imperial College London).

== History ==
The journal was established by Sir Ronald Ross in 1906 as Annals of Tropical Medicine and Parasitology to share the results of the Liverpool School of Tropical Medicine's research and field expeditions. In May 2011, the journal was purchased by Maney Publishing, obtaining its current title in 2012, reflecting a broader focus including the biology, immunology, genetics, treatment, and control of pathogens of medical relevance beyond a regional definition.

== Abstracting and indexing ==
The journal is abstracted and indexed in:

- AGRICOLA
- BIOSIS Previews
- CAB Abstracts
- Chemical Abstracts
- Current Contents/Clinical Medicine
- Current Contents/Life Sciences
- Elsevier BIOBASE/Current Awareness in Biological Sciences
- EMBASE/Excerpta Medica
- Index Medicus/MEDLINE/PubMed
- PASCAL
- Science Citation Index
- Scopus
- Tropical Diseases Bulletin
- The Zoological Record

According to the Journal Citation Reports, the journal has a 2022 impact factor of 3.4.
