= Tuzla Cemetery =

Cemetery in Istanbul, Turkey

- Main entrance of Tuzla Cemetery.
- Interactive map of Tuzla Cemetery

Details
- Location: Tuzla, Istanbul
- Country: Turkey
- Type: Public
- Owned by: Istanbul Metropolitan Municipality

The Tuzla Cemetery (Turkish: Tuzla Mezarlığı) Located in the Cami neighborhood of Istanbul’s Tuzla district, this is the district's central cemetery, operated by the Istanbul Metropolitan Municipality (İBB) Anatolian Side Cemeteries Directorate.

The cemetery's history dates back to the 16th century Ottoman period.

The cemetery is the final resting place of some of Tuzla’s prominent figures, as well as notable figures from the worlds of art, politics, and literature.

== Notable burials ==
Listed in alphabetical order of family names:

- Ahmet Kiliç (1927–1986), Tuzla's first mayor.
- Aydın Güven Gürkan (1941–2006), Turkish politician.
- Filiz Aker (1963–2017), Turkish actress and former model.
- Güllü (1973–2025), Turkish singer.
- Kemal Çapraz (1964–2008), Turkish journalist, researcher, writer, and Turkologist.
- Kenan Kocatürk (1909–1999), retired colonel and author.
- Şıvga Gerez (1970–2026), Turkish dancer and actress.
