= John Eppig =

Professor emeritus

John J. Eppig is professor emeritus at the Jackson Laboratory in Bar Harbor, Maine. He studies the development and function of the oocyte-granulosa cell complex in mammals. He is the first researcher to achieve the first complete development of mammalian oocytes in vitro. He is a member of the National Academy of Sciences.

== Early life and education ==
Eppig was born in 1943. His father was a pediatrician and his mother was a homemaker with a master's degree in English. He received his B.S. in biology from Villanova University, and a Ph.D. in endocrinology from the Catholic University of America. He did research for his doctorate at the Molecular Anatomy Program of Oak Ridge National Laboratory, and did a postdoctoral fellowship at University of Tennessee at Oak Ridge in developmental biology.

== Career ==
He was an assistant professor.at Brooklyn College in New York for three years. In 1975 he became an assistant professor at the Jackson Laboratory until he retired in 2013.

== Honors ==
In 2011 Eppig was elected to the National Academy of Sciences.
