= Nora J. Besansky =

American molecular biologist (born 1960)

- Born: 1960 (age 65–66); Washington, D.C., US
- Spouse: Frank H. Collins

Academic background
- Education: BA, Biology, 1982, Oberlin College; M.S., 1987, Genetics, M.Phil, PhD, 1990, Yale University

Academic work
- Institutions: University of Notre Dame

Nora J. Besansky (born 1960) is an American molecular biologist. She is the Martin J. Gillen Professor of Biological Sciences at the University of Notre Dame. In 2020, Besansky was elected a Member of the National Academy of Sciences for being an expert in the genomics of malaria vectors.

== Early life and education ==
Besansky was born in 1960 as the only child to Ukrainian immigrants who raised her near Washington, D.C. She grew up in Silver Spring, Maryland and earned her first job at the Insect Zoo at the Smithsonian National Museum of Natural History. Besansky completed her Bachelor of Arts degree at Oberlin College in 1982 where she was also elected to Phi Beta Kappa. Following her undergraduate degree, Besansky accepted a technician position in a research laboratory at the National Institutes of Health. Besansky eventually returned to school where she completed her Master's degree and Master of Philosophy in Genetics at Yale University in 1987. She remained at Yale for her PhD before completing her postdoctoral research fellowship at the Centers for Disease Control and Prevention (CDC).

== Career ==
Besansky continued to work with the CDC as a scientist following her fellowship while simultaneously maintaining an adjunct assistant professor position at the University of Notre Dame. She was then promoted to the rank of associate professor in the Department of Biological Sciences until 2002. While in this role, Besansky collaborated with her husband Frank H. Collins to genetically engineer Anopheles gambiae as a response to Malaria. She focused on comparing the DNA from various gambiae populations in West Africa to determine whether they were interbreeding. Besansky was then encouraged by Harvard University professor William Gelbart to write a report proposing the sequencing of a cluster of eight Anopheles malaria vectors, including multiple An. gambiae complex members. This resulted in funding for a pilot genome-sequencing project focusing on An. gambiae Mopti (M) and Savanna (S). In 2005, Besansky was recognized by the American Association for the Advancement of Science for making "significant contributions to understanding the molecular, population and evolutionary biology of Anopheline mosquitoes, major vectors of malaria in Africa."

Once the results of her genome-sequencing project were published in 2010, Besansky was approved to start a cluster project that was upgraded to include 16 Anopheles species. Her original pilot project's genomic analysis revealed that M and S varieties of the Anopholes gambiae species were evolving into two distinct species. At the same time, she was appointed the Rev. John Cardinal O’Hara, C.S.C. Professor of Biological Sciences at the University of Notre Dame. In 2014, Besansky's second cluster project published the results of their investigation into the genetic differences between 16 Anopheles species. Their findings revealed a closer gene connection between the species and how it contributed to their flexibility to adapt to new environments and to seek out human blood. In the same year, she was elected a Fellow of the American Society of Tropical Medicine and Hygiene.

Besansky continued to focus on gene sequencing which resulted in the sequencing of the genetic code of the Y chromosome in An. gambiae and closely related species in 2016 using long single-molecule sequencing technology and physical mapping of DNA directly to the Y chromosome. Following this, Besansky was elected a Fellow of the Entomological Society of America and Royal Entomological Society. In 2020, Besansky was elected a member of the National Academy of Sciences for being an expert in the genomics of malaria vectors.

== Personal life ==
Besansky and her husband, tropical disease researcher Frank H. Collins, have two sons together.
