= Lynn Riddiford =

American entomologist

Lynn M. Riddiford
- Born: Lynn Virginia Moorhead; Tennessee
- Education: Radcliffe College, Cornell University
- Known for: Hormonal control of molting and metamorphosis
- Spouse: James W. Truman
- Awards: National Academy of Sciences
- Scientific career
- Fields: Entomology, developmental biology
- Workplaces: University of Washington, Harvard University, Wellesley College
- Thesis: Structural Studies of Paramyosin (1961)
- Doctoral advisor: Marcus Singer, Harold Scheraga
- Other academic advisors: Carroll Williams, John Edsall
- Website: www.biology.washington.edu/people/profile/lynn-m-riddiford

Lynn Moorhead Riddiford (born 1936) is an American entomologist and developmental biologist. She was the first female faculty member in the Harvard Biology Department where she served as an assistant and associate professor. She is an emeritus professor at the University of Washington. In 1997, she was the first awardee of the Recognition Award in Insect Physiology, Biochemistry, and Toxicology from the Entomological Society of America. Riddiford studies the endocrinology of insects, specifically the tobacco hornworm.

== Education ==
Riddiford attended Radcliffe College. Her junior year, she joined Carroll Williams' lab at Harvard, where she began studying juvenile hormone in insects and other animals and plants. This work led to her first major publication in Nature in 1959. She graduated in biochemical sciences in 1958. She received her Ph.D. in zoology at Cornell University in 1961, advised by Professors Marcus Singer and Harold Scheraga.

== Career ==
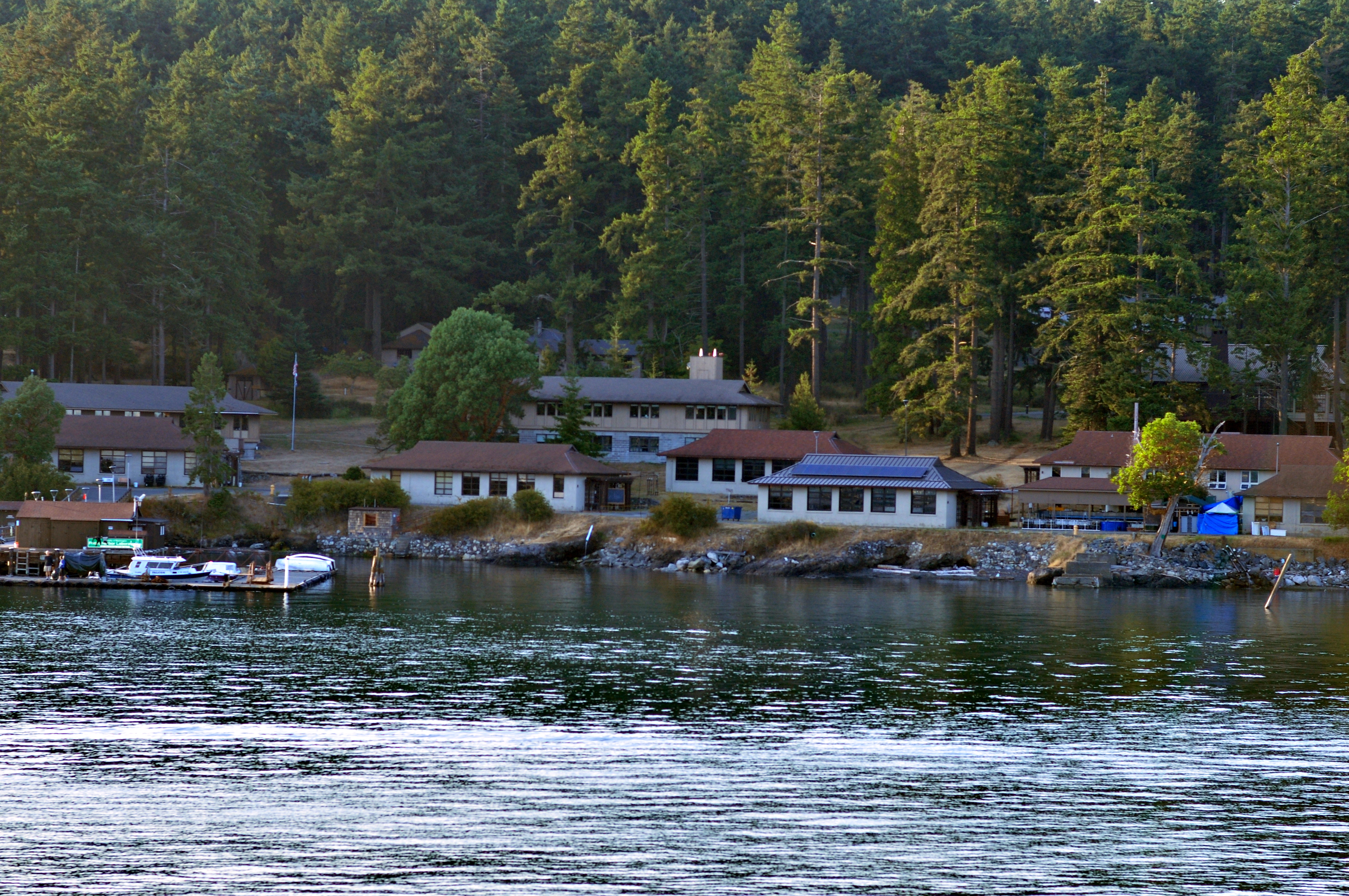
University of Washington Friday Harbor Marine Biology Laboratories

Riddiford returned to Harvard as a postdoctoral fellow in John Edsall's laboratory for two years. She then taught zoology at Wellesley College for two years. In 1965, she returned to Harvard as a research associate in Williams's laboratory, then became an assistant professor in 1966 and associate professor in 1971 in the Harvard Biology Department. Her lab focused on the endocrinology of the tobacco hornworm, Manduca sexta, and led to key findings about the interplay of juvenile hormone and molting hormone. In 1973, Riddiford moved to the Department of Zoology University of Washington. In 2007, she retired from the university and became a senior fellow at the Janelia Farm Research Campus of the Howard Hughes Medical Institute. She retired from Janelia in 2016.

In 1979, Riddiford was awarded a John Simon Guggenheim fellowship. In 1993 she was elected a fellow of the American Academy of Arts and Sciences. In 2010, Riddiford became an elected member of the National Academy of Sciences. In 2011, she was awarded the Howard Vollum Award for Distinguished Accomplishment in Science and Technology from Reed College. In June 2018, Riddiford was elected to the Washington Academy of Science for significant contributions to the field of developmental biology.

== Personal life ==
Riddiford married James Truman, her former graduate student. Riddiford and Truman retired from Janelia Research Campus in 2016 and moved back to the University of Washington setting up their laboratory at the Friday Harbor Laboratories, Friday Harbor, Washington.
