= Flaminia Catteruccia =

Italian professor of immunology and infectious disease

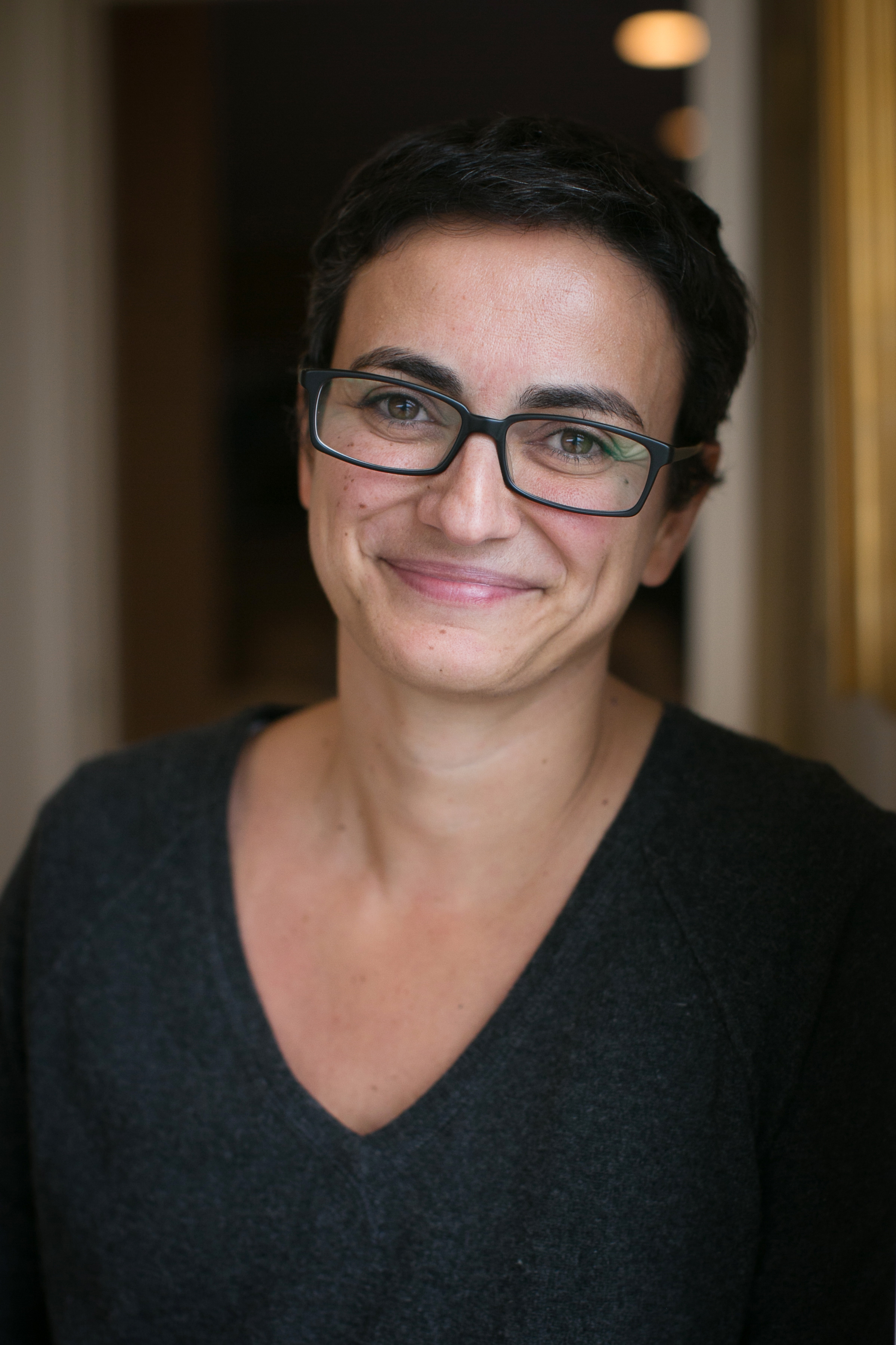
- Flaminia Catteruccia
- Education: Imperial College London
- Scientific career
- Fields: Parasitology, malariology, entomology

Flaminia Catteruccia is an Italian professor of immunology and infectious disease at the Harvard T.H. Chan School of Public Health, studying the interactions between malaria and the Anopheles mosquitoes that transmit the parasites.

== Early life and education ==
Catteruccia initially trained in chemistry for her undergraduate degree, however upon graduating she decided to venture into malaria biology with a research fellowship at the University of Rome La Sapienza. She did her PhD at Imperial College London researching genetic manipulation of Anopheles stephensi. She received her PhD in 1999, a year later publishing a demonstration of the integration of a transposon into the genome of the mosquitoes, which was inherited by progeny.

== Career ==
Catteruccia was awarded the MRC Career Development Award and Wellcome Trust Value in People Award in 2006. She first set up her own independent research group at Imperial College London in 2007.

Her lab is interested in the reproductive behaviours of mosquitoes, particularly Anopheles gambiae. In 2009 she published research showing that the seminal plug deposited by the male mosquitoes in females after mating is essential for successful reproduction. By knocking down a male enzyme involved in forming the plug (using RNAi), which led to unsuccessful reproductive attempts, her and colleagues demonstrated the necessity of the structure previously thought only to be involved in preventing competition from the sperm of other males. Later her and Andrea Crisanti's teams made a successful gene knockdown in mosquitoes which rendered males completely sterile. Females didn't attempt to mate again after their first copulation with the sterile male, suggesting that the release of sterile males into the wild (as organisations such as Oxitec are currently doing) could have a major effect on mosquito populations. After briefly moving to the University of Perugia, Catteruccia joined the faculty of Harvard as a professor in 2011 upon an invitation by Dyann Wirth. Two years later, Catteruccia and colleagues investigated the role of a male hormone in stimulating female production of eggs; an unusual direct link between copulation and ovulation as opposed to the other way round. Catteruccia is also involved in the design of gene drives to force malaria-resistance genes to spread through mosquito populations, using CRISPR gene editing.

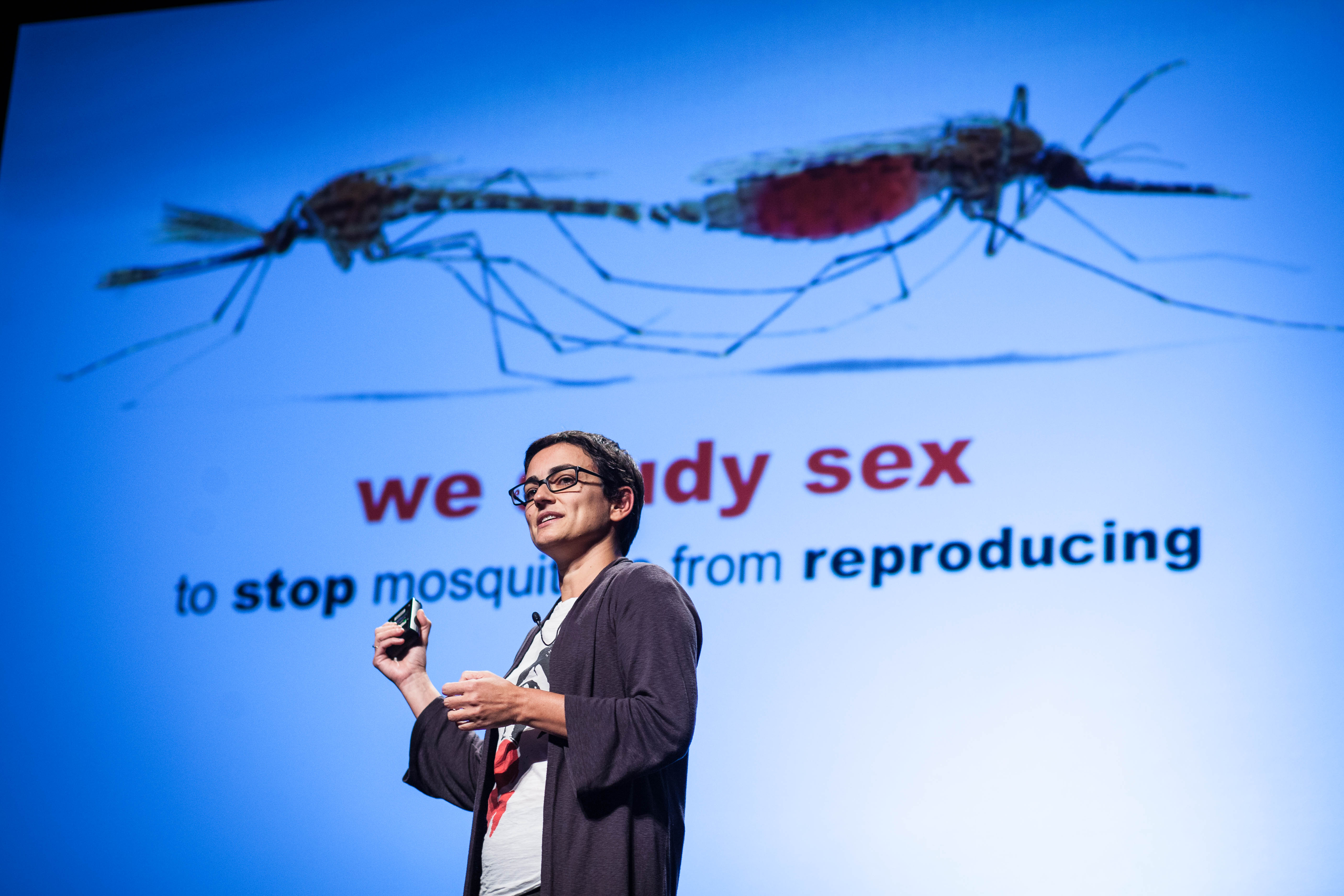
Catteruccia as a 2012 PopTech Science fellow giving a talk on the reproductive biology of Anopheles mosquitoes

In 2016 Catteruccia was awarded a faculty scholarship by the Howard Hughes Medical Institute, Bill & Melinda Gates Foundation, and the Simons Foundation worth $1.2 million to continue her malaria research.

In 2019 Catteruccia published research in Nature demonstrating that exposure of mosquitoes to antimalarial medication lead to a reduction in their parasite load. The study was notable because surprisingly low quantities of the drug atovaquone were needed to induce refractoriness of the mosquitoes towards parasite infection, and the compound could be absorbed through the legs of the insect (as if it was landing briefly on a bed net). This could potentially be used to design more effective bed nets, which are currently becoming less effective due to the spread of insecticide resistance in mosquitoes. Although mosquitoes are unlikely to develop resistance, given that their survival rates appear to be unaffected by the drug in lab conditions, malaria may still develop resistance especially if the drug is implemented on a mass scale.

== Awards ==
2024 - Elected to the National Academy of Sciences

2021 - Howard Hughes Medical Institute Investigator

2016 - Faculty Scholar award - Howard Hughes Medical Institute and Bill & Melinda Gates Foundation

2012 - PopTech Science Fellow

2006 - MRC Career Development Award

== Selected publications ==
- W. Robert Shaw, Flaminia Catteruccia. 2019. Vector biology meets disease control: using basic research to fight vector-borne diseases. Nat Microbiol; 4(1):20-34. doi:10.1038/s41564-018-0214-7.
- Kristine Werling, W Robert Shaw, Maurice A Itoe, Kathleen A Westervelt, Perrine Marcenac, Douglas G Paton, Duo Peng, Naresh Singh, Andrea L Smidler, Adam South, Amy A Deik, Liliana Mancio-Silva, Allison R Demas, Sandra March, Eric Calvo, Sangeeta N Bhatia, Clary B Clish, Flaminia Catteruccia. 2019. Steroid Hormone Function Controls Non-competitive Plasmodium Development in Anopheles. Cell;177(2):315-325.e14. doi:10.1016/j.cell.2019.02.036.
- Douglas G Paton, Lauren M Childs, Maurice A Itoe, Inga E Holmdahl, Caroline O Buckee, Flaminia Catteruccia. 2019. Exposing Anopheles mosquitoes to antimalarials blocks Plasmodium parasite transmission. Nature;567(7747):239-243. doi:10.1038/s41586-019-0973-1.
- Chloe Greppi, Willem J Laursen, Gonzalo Budelli, Elaine C Chang, Abigail M Daniels, Lena van Giesen, Andrea L Smidler, Flaminia Catteruccia, Paul A Garrity. Mosquito heat seeking is driven by an ancestral cooling receptor. Science;367(6478):681-684. doi:10.1126/science.aay9847.
- Flaminia Catteruccia. 2016. Flaminia Catteruccia – Digging into the Sex Life of Mosquitoes. Trends Parasitology; 32(10):751-752. doi:10.1016/j.pt.2016.05.012.
- Flaminia Catteruccia. 2020. Malaria-carrying mosquitoes get a leg up on insecticides. Nature;577(7790):319-320. doi:10.1038/d41586-019-03728-5.
