= Serap Aksoy =

Turkish–American medical entomologist

- Born: 1955 (age 70–71); Fatih, Istanbul
- Known for: tsetse flies

Academic background
- Education: BSc, Biology, 1978, Vassar College; PhD, 1982, Columbia University
- Thesis: Regulation of rRNA gene expression in Escherichia coli (1982)

Academic work
- Institutions: Yale School of Public Health

Fatma Serap Aksoy (born in 1955) is a Turkish–American medical entomologist.

== Early life and education ==
Aksoy was born in Fatih, Istanbul in 1955. After graduating from Robert College, she moved to the United States for her Bachelor of Science degree in biology from Vassar College. Following this, she earned a PhD in biology from Columbia University and then completed a postdoctoral fellowship the Yale School of Public Health.

== Career ==
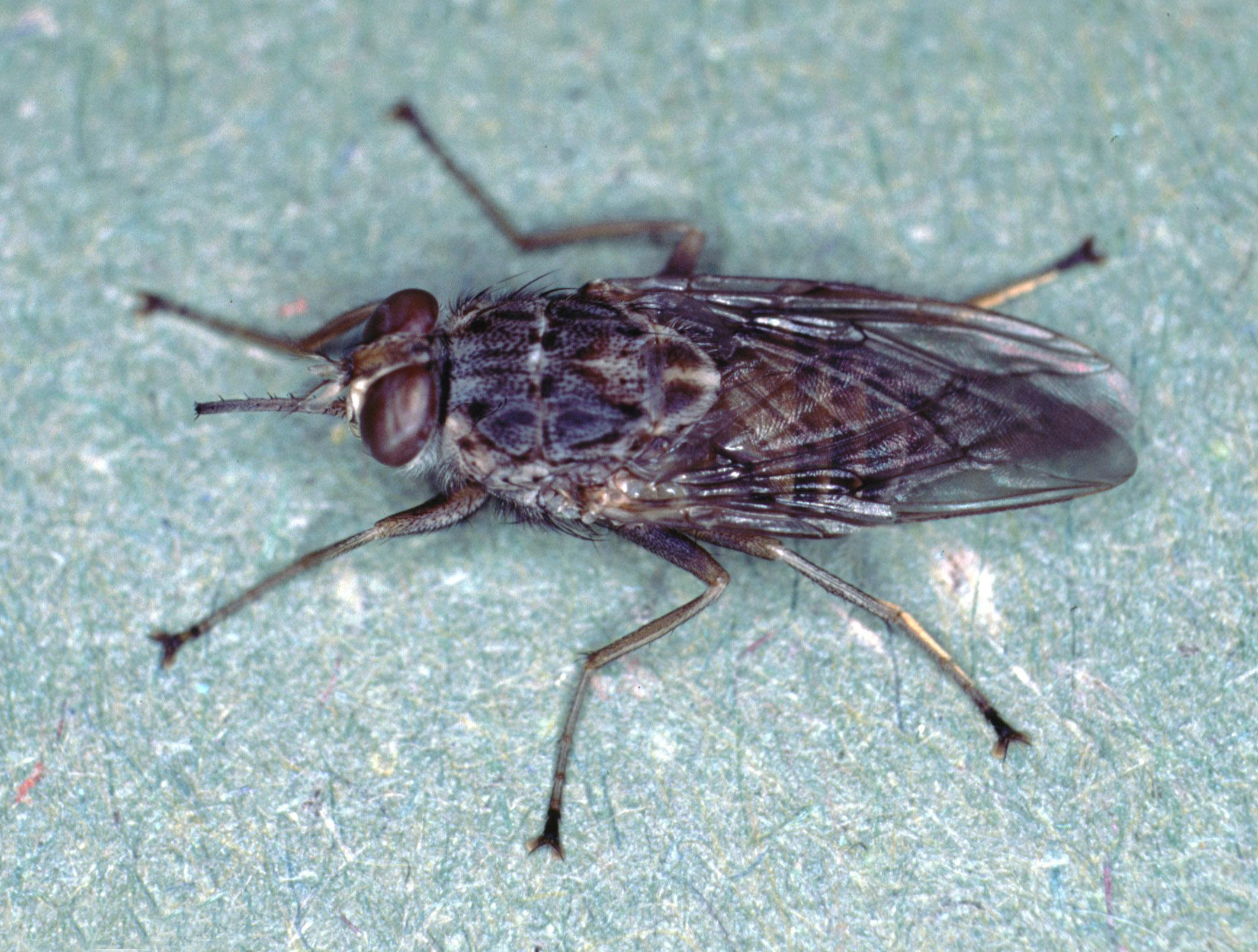
A photo of a tsetse fly

Following her post-doctoral fellowship, Aksoy joined the faculty at the Yale School of Public Health in 1988. She was eventually promoted to full professor in 2001 and served as the department chair from 2002 to 2010. As a full professor, Aksoy focused on studying the transmission of human African Trypanosomiasis. She was specifically interested in conducting studies to genetically alter tsetse flies so it would be unable to transmit the parasite to humans and livestock. As part of this research, Aksoy also studied the genome in Sodalis, which was published in Massive genome erosion and functional adaptations provide insights into the symbiotic lifestyle of Sodalis glossinidius in the tsetse host. In 2009, Aksoy was appointed editor in chief of the PLOS Neglected Tropical Diseases, after having served as the journal's deputy editor.

In 2014, Aksoy was a member of an international team of researchers that successfully sequenced the genetic code of the tsetse fly. This was a 10-year effort that began when Aksoy helped initiate the collaborative research project in the early 2000s. Following the sequencing of the genetic code, Aksoy continued to research ways to improve control methods of infections and develop strategies to reduce or eliminate its transmission. As such, she received a Fulbright Scholarship to support her project "Innovative Methods for Control of Insect-Transmitted Diseases" in Italy. Upon returning, Aksoy led a research team into examining an additional control strategy called para-transgenic expression to synthesize proteins that target trypanosomes in microbes cultivated from the gut of tsetse flies. Aksoy was also one of four Yale female professors to be honored with Women of Innovation awards by the Connecticut Technology Council. The following year, she was the first recipient of the Breakthroughs in Medical Entomology Award in recognition of her discoveries regarding the mammalian trypanosome surface proteins known as Variant Surface Glycoproteins (VSG). Her research team were the first to find why these proteins favored parasite infection transmission.

As a result of her global efforts in reducing infection, Aksoy and Peter Salovey participated in a signing ceremony with the Kenya Agricultural Research and Livestock Organization and Kenya Wildlife Service in 2018 to continue their existing partnership. The renewed agreement also allowed for the transfer of tsetse fly parts to Yale for further research. The following year, she was honored by the Connecticut Academy of Science and Engineering. In 2021, Aksoy was elected a member of the National Academy of Sciences for her research into microbial diseases.
