= Margaret A. Phillips =

American biologist

- Born: November 3, 1959 (age 66)
- Education: University of California, San Francisco; University of California, Davis
- Scientific career
- Workplaces: University of Texas Southwestern Medical Center
- Thesis: Ornithine decarboxylase in the African trypanosome (1988)

Margaret A. Phillips (born November 3, 1959) is an American biologist who is the Sam G. Winstead and F. Andrew Bell Distinguished Chair in Biochemistry at the University of Texas Southwestern Medical Center. She was elected a Fellow of the National Academy of Sciences in 2021.

== Early life and education ==
Phillips was born in Cleveland. She was an undergraduate student at the University of California, Davis, where she studied biochemistry. In 1981, Philips joined Syva, a biochemistry company in Palo Alto, California. After two years she returned to university, as a graduate student at the University of California, San Francisco and the laboratory of C. C. Wang. She remained at the University of California, San Francisco as a postdoctoral scholar with William J. Rutter.

== Research and career ==
Phillips was appointed to the faculty at the University of Texas Southwestern Medical Center in 1992, where she was promoted to Carolyn R. Bacon Professor in 2009 and Chair of the Department in 2016. Her research considers the development of novel therapeutic strategies for the treatment of malaria.

== Awards and honors ==
- 1999 Scholar Award in Molecular Parasitology
- 2010 Medicines for Malaria Venture Project of the Year
- 2021 Elected Fellow of the National Academy of Sciences

== Selected publications ==
- W Armand Guiguemde; Anang A. Shelat; David C. Bouck; et al. (1 May 2010). "Chemical genetics of Plasmodium falciparum". Nature. 465 (7296): 311–315. doi:10.1038/nature09099. ISSN 1476-4687. PMC 2874979. PMID 20485428. Wikidata Q29617272.
- N. V. Grishin; M A Phillips; E J Goldsmith (July 1995). "Modeling of the spatial structure of eukaryotic ornithine decarboxylases". Protein Science. 4 (7): 1291–304. doi:10.1002/pro.5560040705. ISSN 0961-8368. PMC 2143167. PMID 7670372. Wikidata Q24675092.
