= Pamela Fraker =

American biochemist

- Born: Williamsport, Indiana
- Education: Purdue University, University of Illinois,

Pamela Jean Fraker is professor emeritus at Michigan State University. In 2007 she was elected to the National Academy of Sciences, the first woman from MSU to be so honored. She retired as distinguished professor of biochemistry and molecular biology in May 2012, after 39 years.

== Early life ==
She grew up in Williamsport, Indiana. Despite neither of her parents having high school diplomas, Fraker was encouraged to pursue her education.

== Education ==
She attended Purdue University, starting in 1962, studying biology. She studied under microbiologist Samuel Kaplan at the University of Illinois, Champaign. Fraker earned her PhD at the University of Illinois in 1971.

== Research ==
Fraker was the lead scientist of two studies investigating the physiological factors that influence the immune system, in particular the discovery of an appetite-controlling hormone and the relationship between metabolism, the immune system and the neuroendocrine system.
