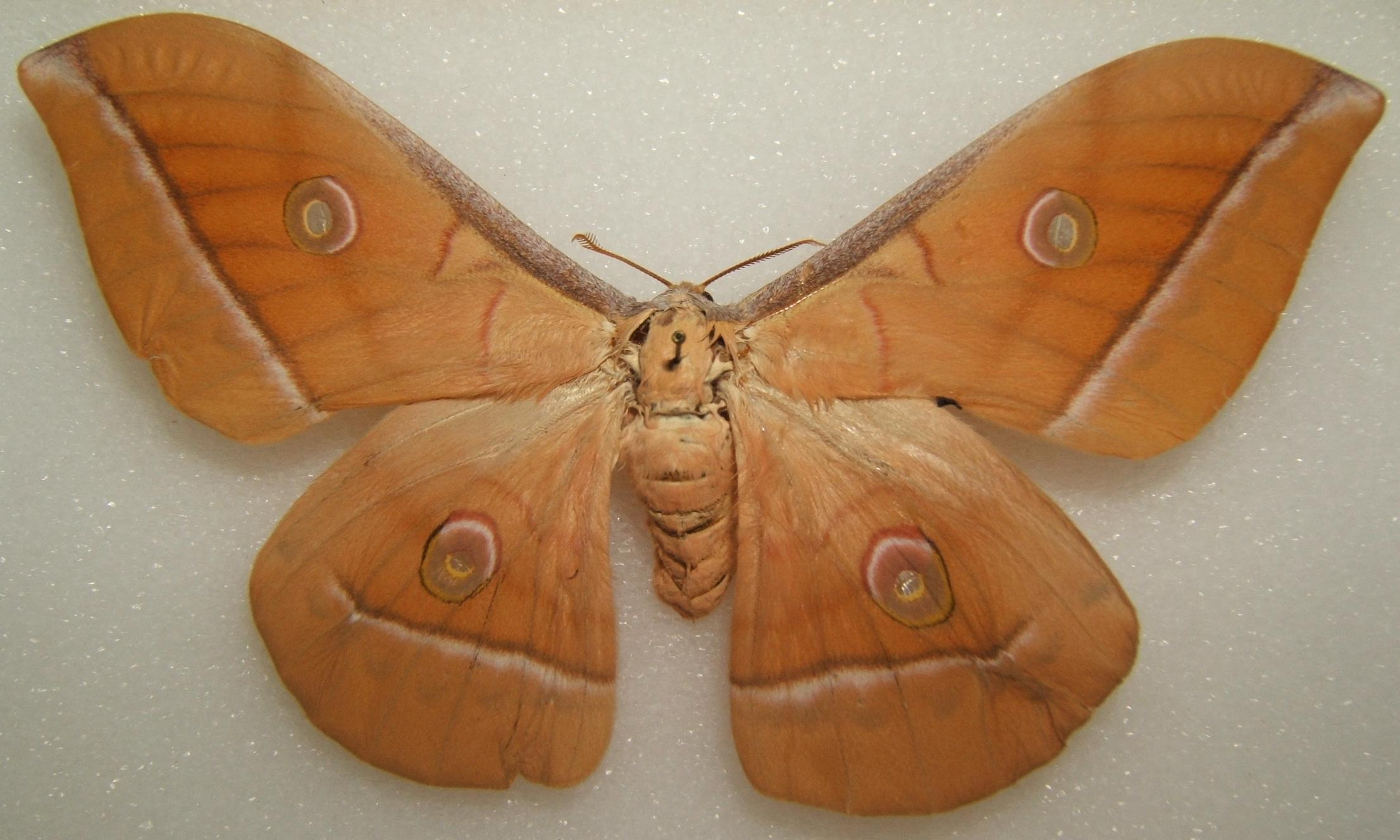
- Mounted female
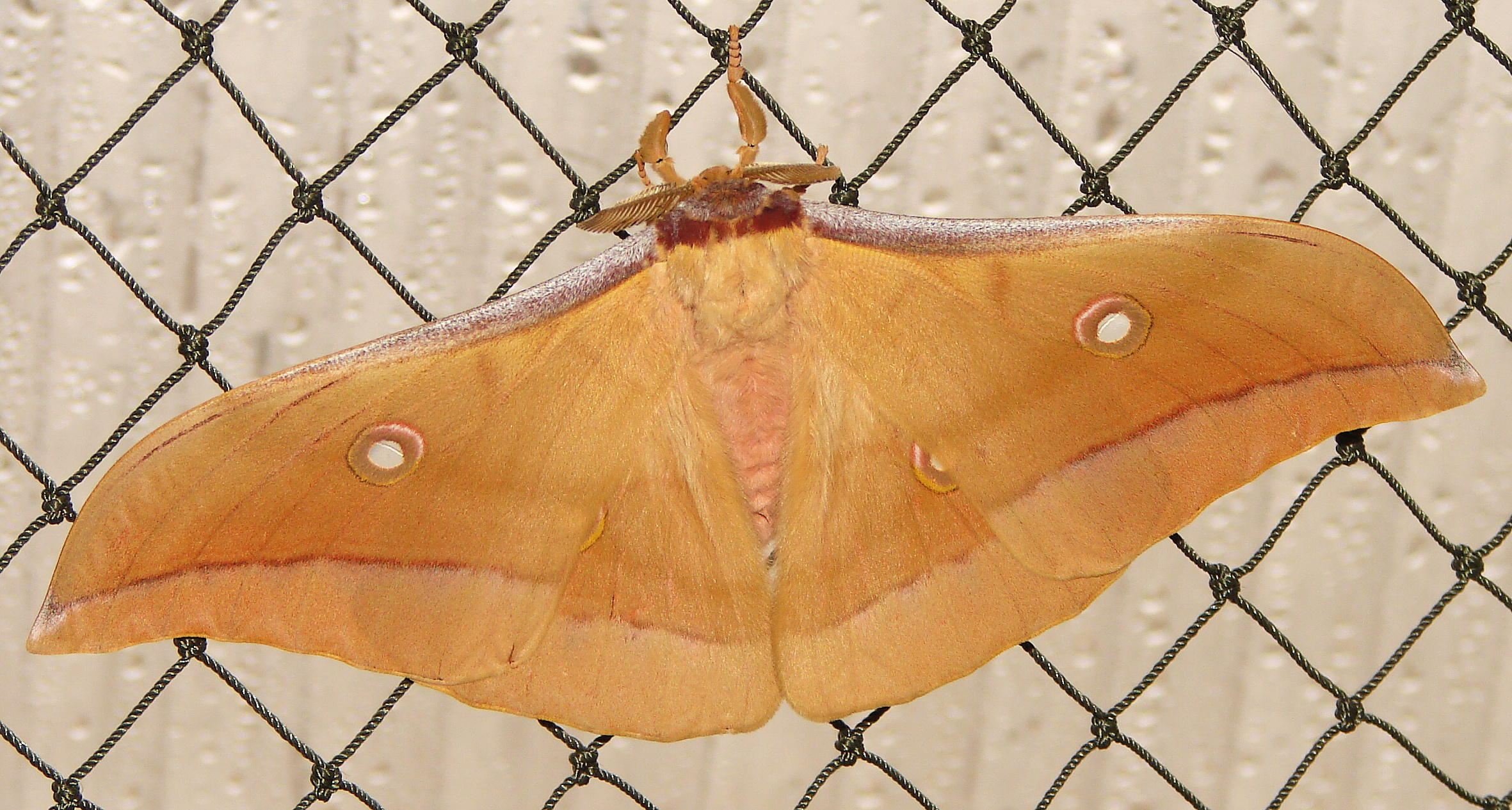
- Living specimen

Scientific classification
- Kingdom: Animalia
- Phylum: Arthropoda
- Clade: Pancrustacea
- Class: Insecta
- Order: Lepidoptera
- Family: Saturniidae
- Genus: Antheraea
- Species: A. pernyi

Binomial name
- Antheraea pernyi (Guérin-Méneville, 1855)

Synonyms
- Antheraea hartii Moore, 1892

= Antheraea pernyi =

Species of moth

Antheraea pernyi, the Chinese oak tussar moth, Chinese tasar moth, or temperate tussar moth, is a large moth in the family Saturniidae. The species was first described by Félix Édouard Guérin-Méneville in 1855. Antheraea roylei is an extremely close relative, and the present species might actually have evolved from ancestral A. roylei by chromosome rearrangement.

They are originally from southern China. Used for tussar silk production, they have been distributed more widely across subtropical and tropical Asia. Unlike the domestic silk moth which is entirely dependent on human care, tussah silk moths can survive in the wild if they escape from captivity; small local populations of such feral stock may thus occasionally occur. The colour and quality of the silk depends on the climate and soil.

This is one of the major producers of tussar silk. It was of commercial importance during the Han dynasty and early Three Kingdoms era, about 200 BC to 250 AD. More recently, the hybridogenic species Antheraea × proylei is being bred for tussah silk production. It originated from a natural hybrid between male A. pernyi and A. roylei females, F1 females of which were backcrossed to A. pernyi males. For reasons unknown, it is a case of paternal mtDNA transmission: the mitochondrial genome, normally inherited from the mother only in sexually reproducing organisms, is almost identical to that of the present species.

This silkworm is raised in China for its silk. It is referred to as tussah, Chinese tussah, oak tussah, or temperate tussah. It is the source of tussah spinning fiber that is used in the West. It is a relative of the tropical tussah silk moth, Antheraea paphia of India, and also related to Antheraea polyphemus, the American polyphemus silk moth. In China, they are fed on plantations of specially trimmed oak trees on the hillsides.

== Immune system ==
The immune responses of A. pernyi to bacterial infection have been analysed based on injection by Escherichia coli D31. Cecropin B and D, hemolin, attacin and lysozyme were detected in the hemolymph. Also, injection of E. coli led to the discovery of a 380-kDa lectin with affinity to galactose and resulted in an increase of hemagglutinating activity. A. pernyi has been used in research on virus defence in insects. It was discovered that hemolin was induced after injection of baculovirus, but also by double-stranded RNA.

== Aging ==
Changes occurring with aging at the dendrite level of olfactory receptor neurons were studied in male A peryni. These aging related changes included DNA fragmentation.

== Gallery ==
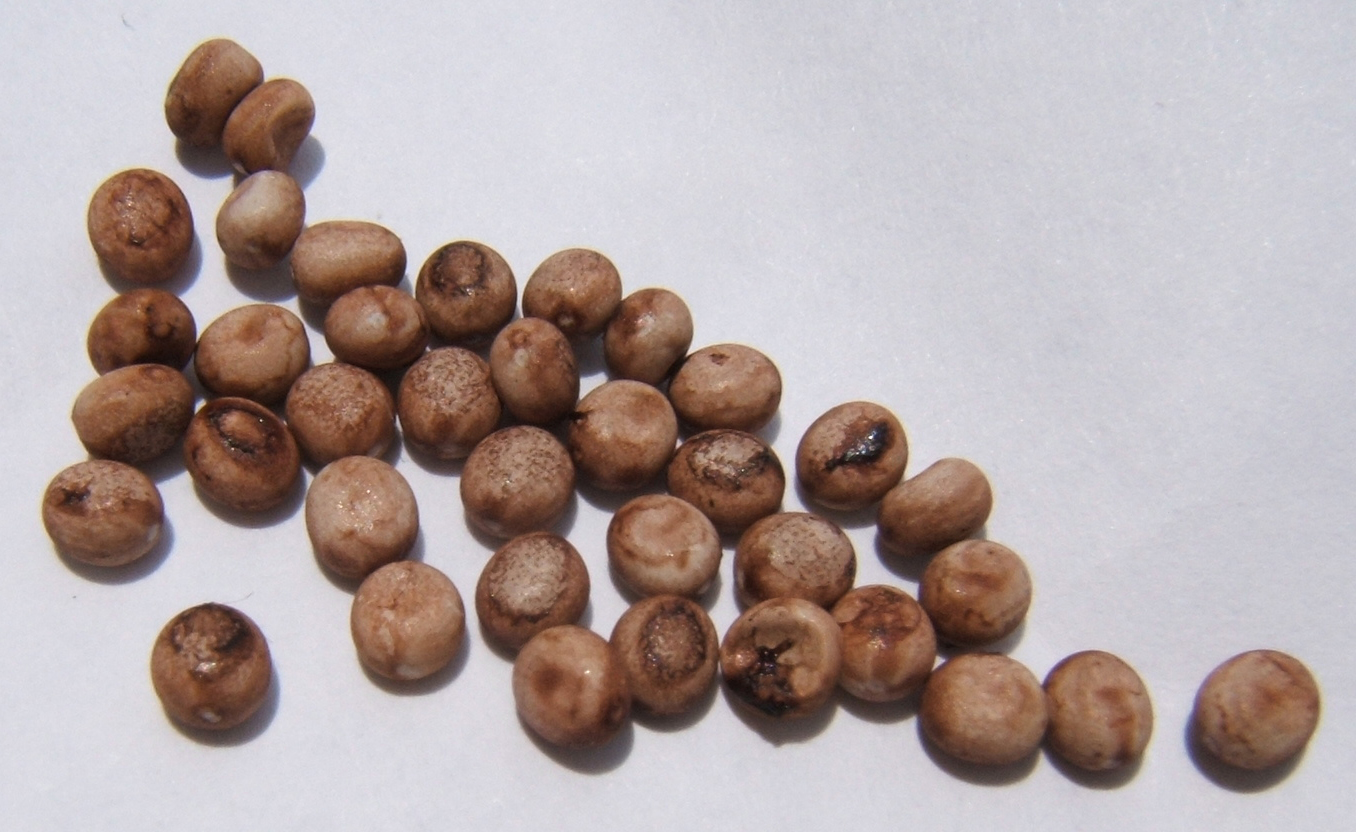
Eggs one day before hatching

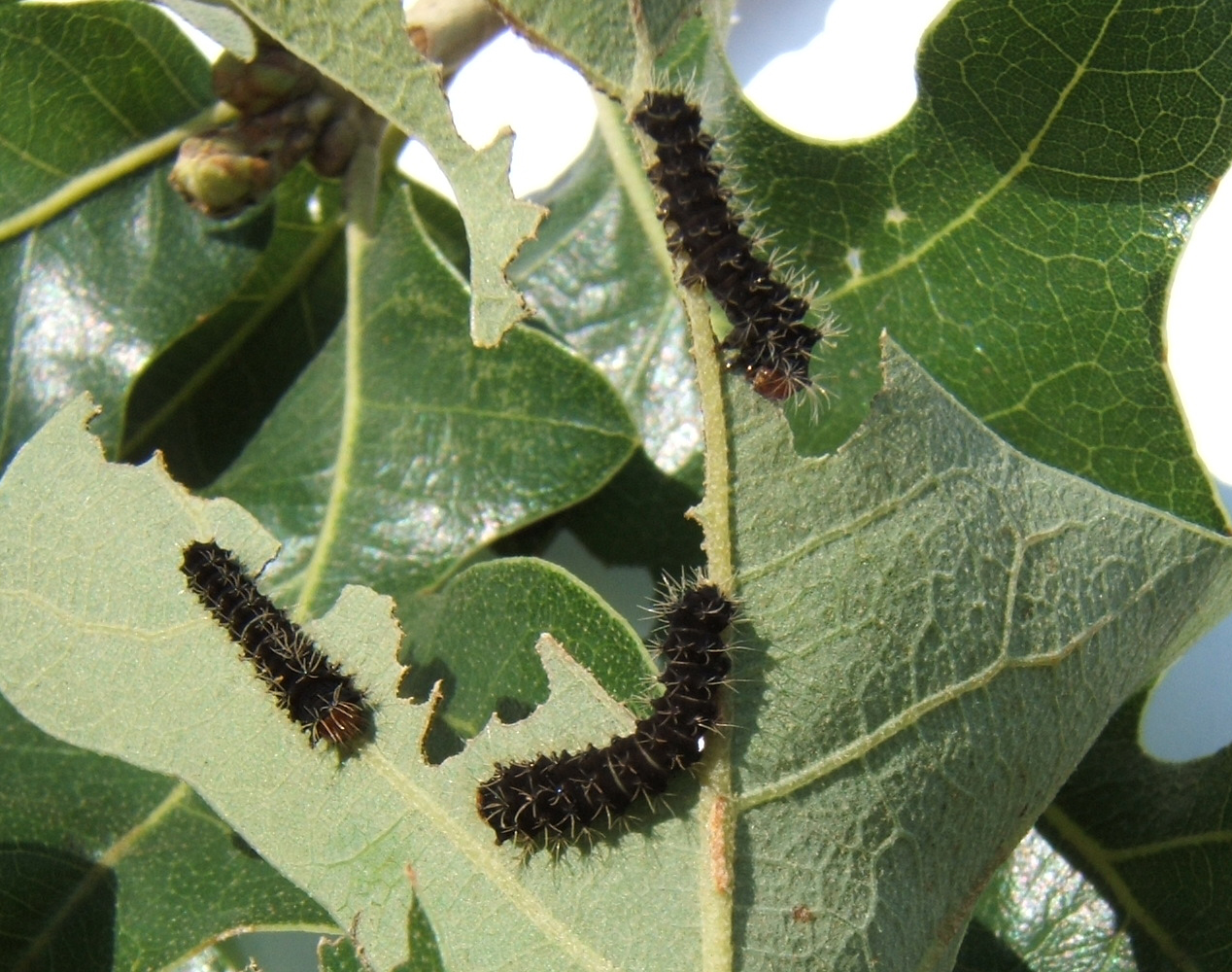
First-instar caterpillars

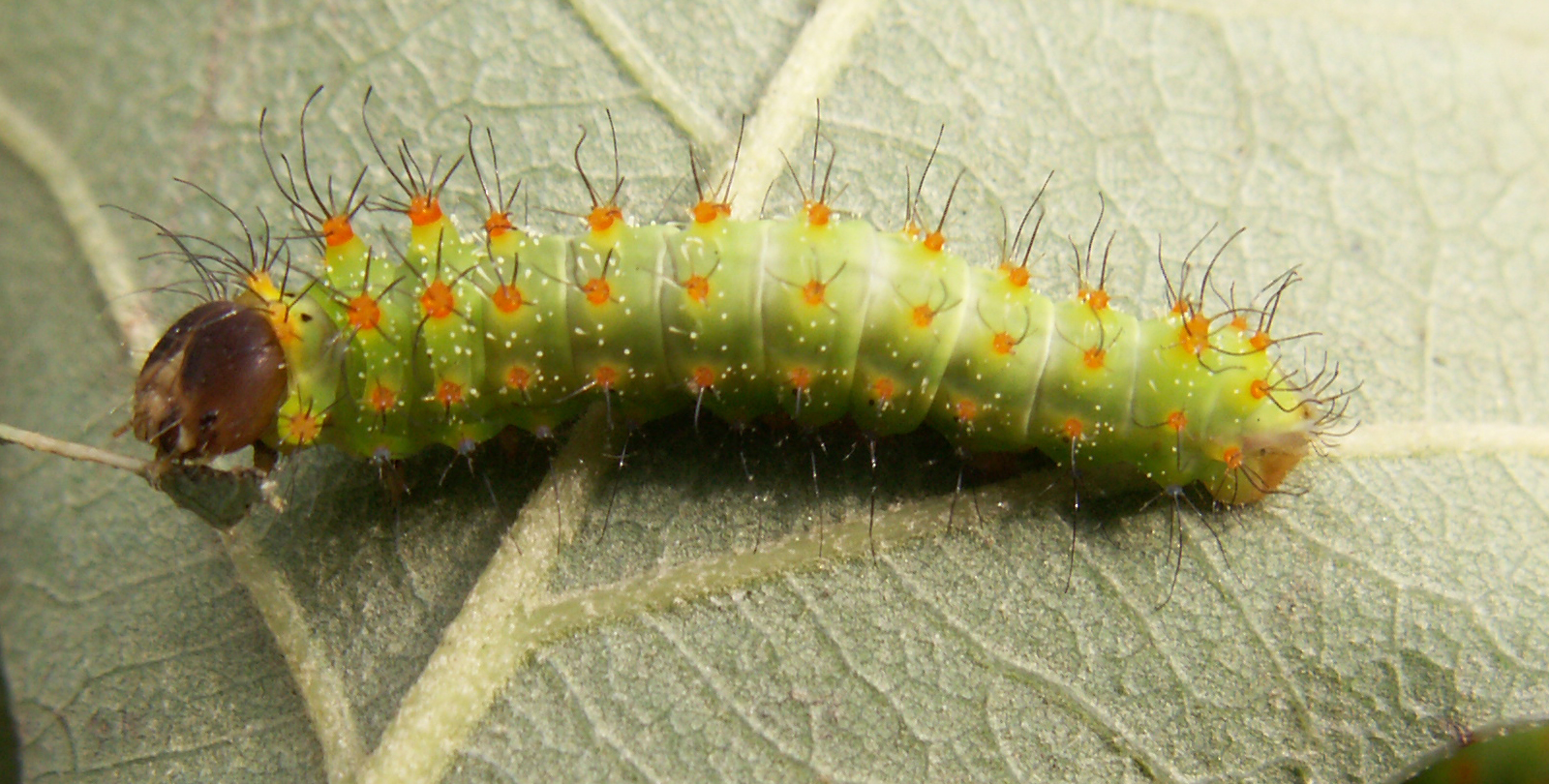
Second-instar caterpillar

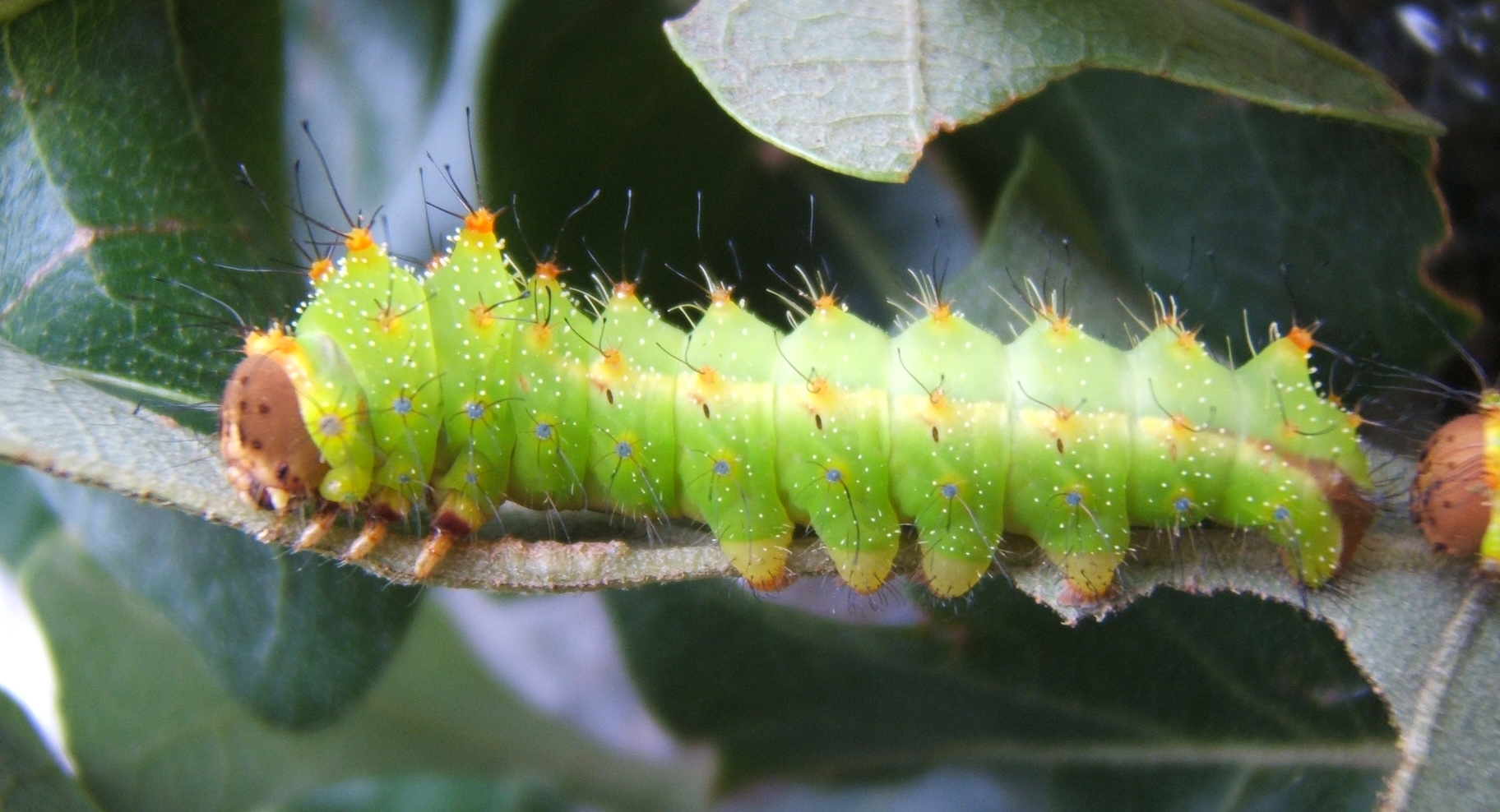
Third-instar caterpillar

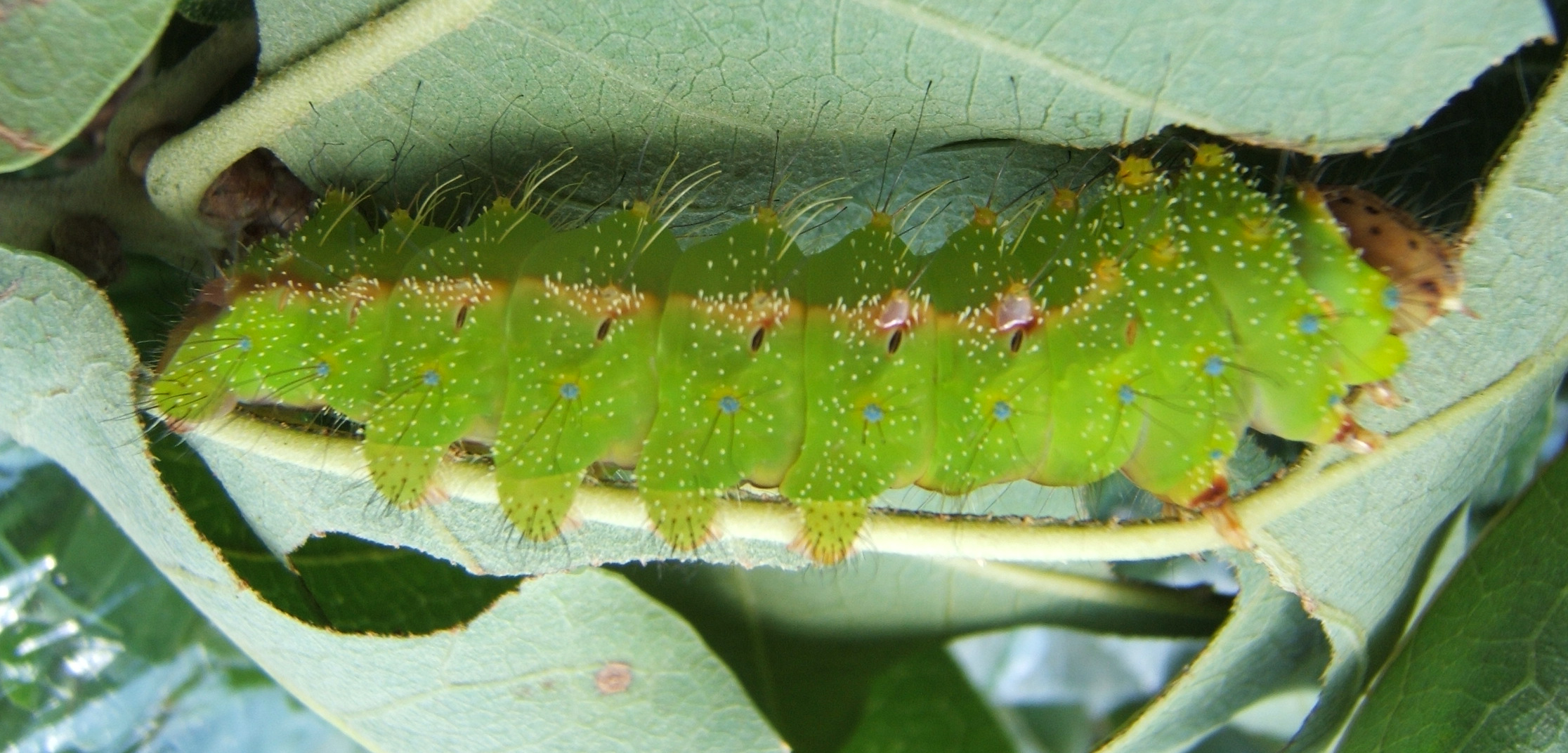
Fourth-instar caterpillar

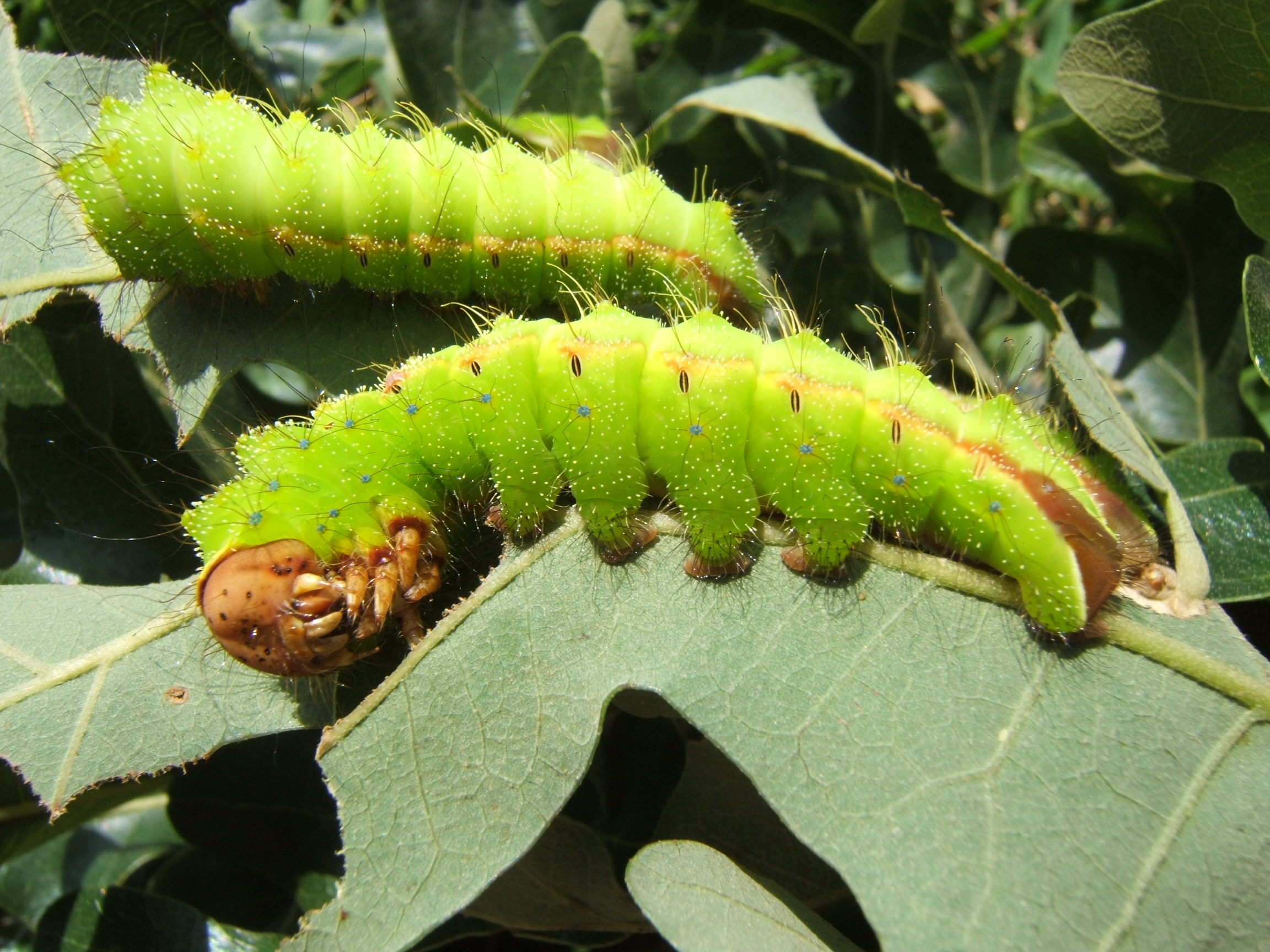
Fifth-instar caterpillars

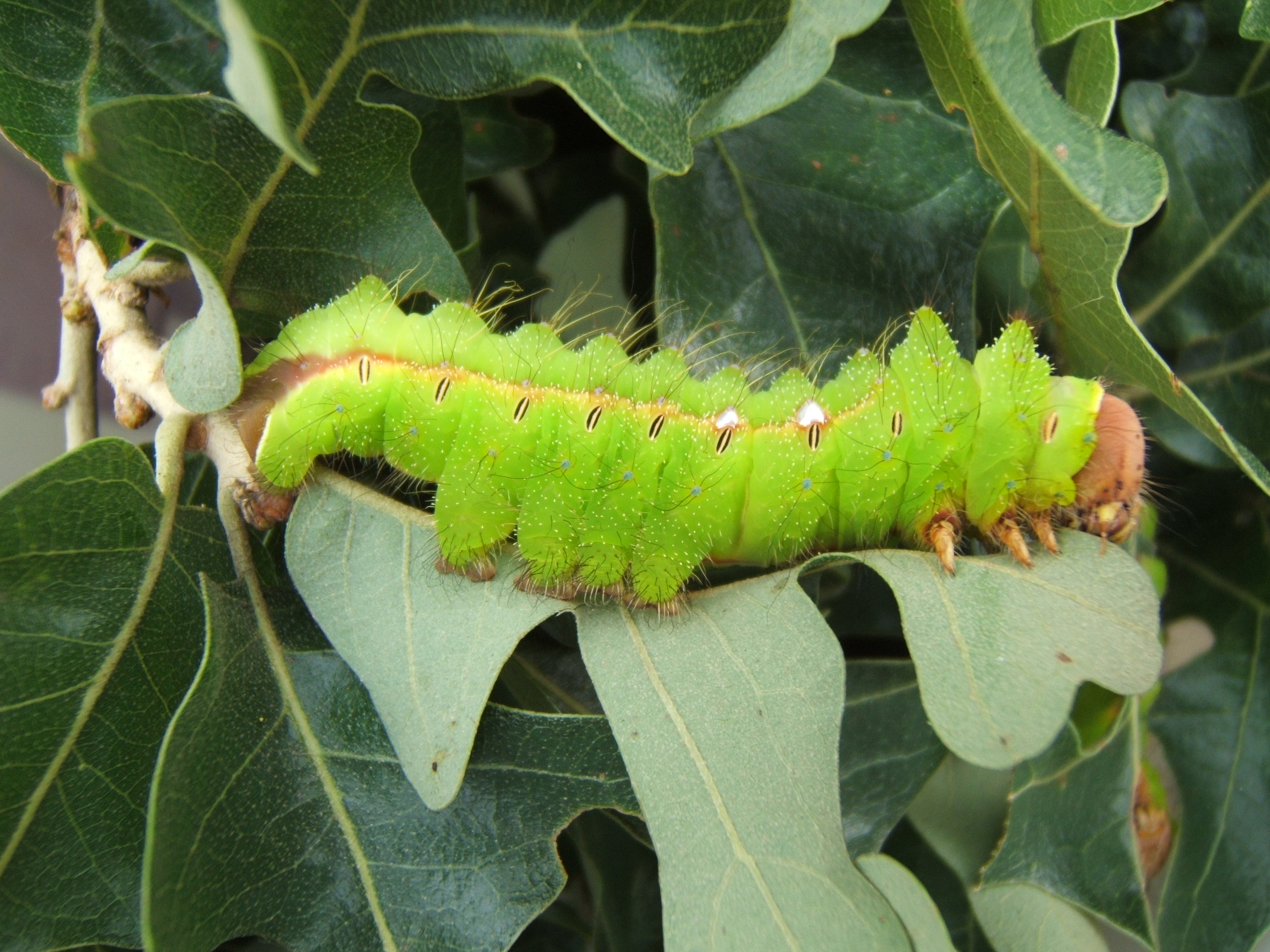
Sixth-instar caterpillar

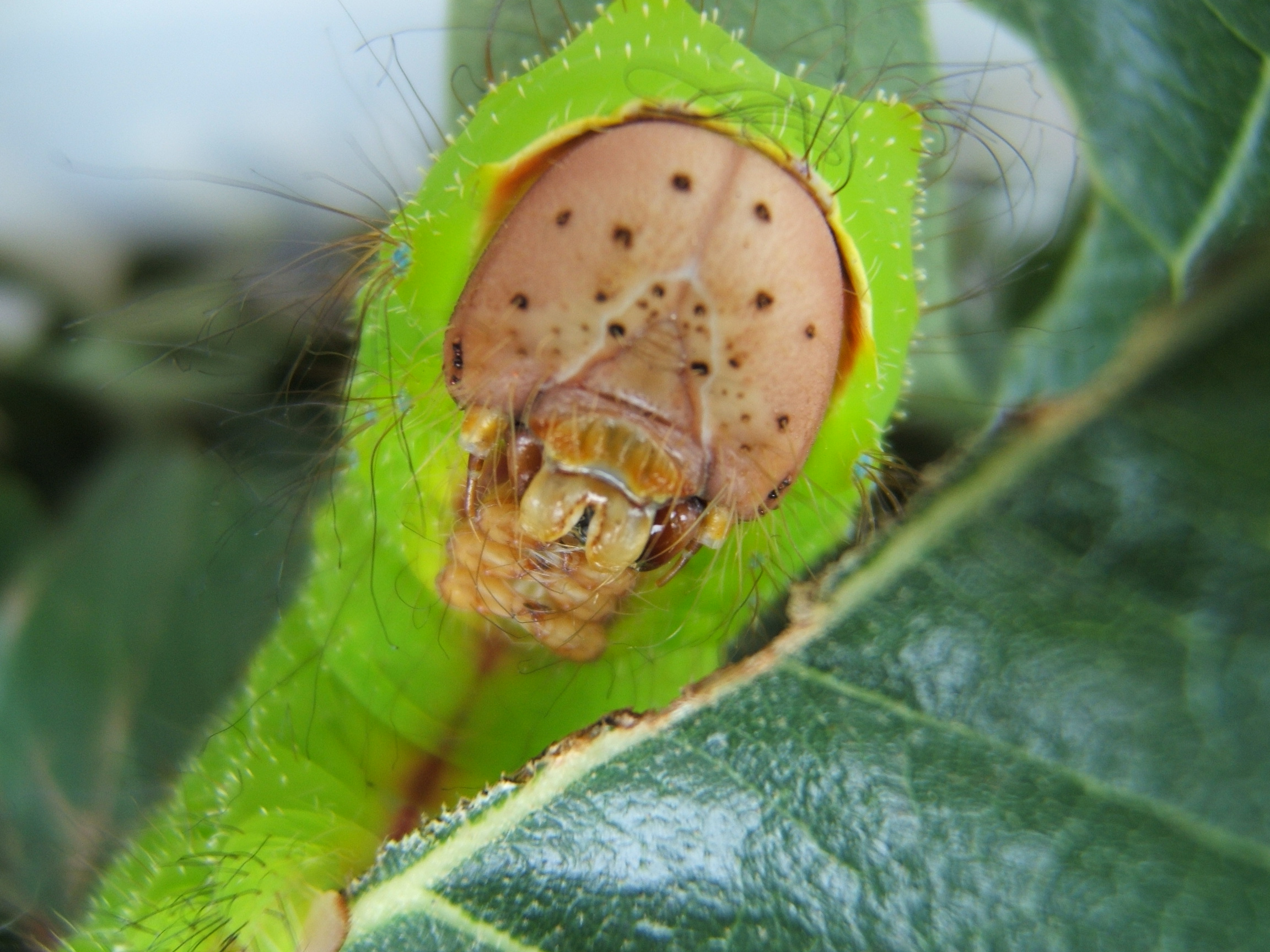
Sixth-instar caterpillar
