= Walter Leal =

Brazilian entomologist (born 1954)

Walter S. Leal
- Born: February 2, 1954 (age 72); Brazil
- Education: Chemical engineering, agricultural chemistry, applied biochemistry
- Alma mater: Federal University of Pernambuco; Mie University; University of Tsukuba
- Known for: Identification of insect pheromones and mosquito attractants and elucidating a mode of action of the insect repellent DEET
- Awards: Fellow, California Academy of Sciences; Fellow, National Academy of Inventors; Corresponding Member, Brazilian Academy of Science; Fellow, American Association for the Advancement of Science; Member, National Academy of Sciences
- Scientific career
- Fields: Chemical ecology, entomology, insect olfaction
- Workplaces: University of California, Davis
- Website: biology.ucdavis.edu/people/walter-leal

Walter Soares Leal (born February 2, 1954) is a Brazilian biochemist and entomologist who is known for identifying pheromones and mosquito attractants, and elucidating a mechanism of action of the insect repellent DEET.

Leal was the first non-Japanese to earn tenure at the Ministry of Agriculture, Forestry, and Fisheries of Japan. In 2000, he accepted a position as associate professor at the University of California, Davis. Leal is a Distinguished Professor in the Department of Molecular and Cellular Biology. He served as chair of the entomology department at UC Davis (now Department of Entomology & Nematology).

== Education and early life ==
Leal attended the Federal University of Pernambuco, from which he graduated in 1982 with a B.Eng degree in chemical engineering. In 1987, he got his MS in agricultural chemistry from Mie University in Tsu-Mie, Japan. While still residing in Japan, Leal attended the University of Tsukuba, division of Applied Biochemistry, graduating with a Ph.D. three years later. While in high school, Leal worked as a sports reporter to pay tuition and fees and later as a high school teacher – a career he started while a freshman in college, under the supervision of his favorite teacher, Aloísio Guimarães Sotero.

== Research ==
Leal has identified complex pheromones from many insect species, including scarab beetles, true bugs, long-horned beetles, and moths. Intrigued by chiral discrimination by scarab beetles, he became interested in the molecular basis of insect olfaction. His laboratory discovered a pH-dependent conformational change in pheromone-binding proteins (PBPs) from moths before their 3D structures were known. In collaboration with Jon Clardy and Nobel Laureate Kurt Wuthrich, they determine the first 3D structures of PBPs. Subsequently, his laboratory studied the kinetics of pheromone binding and release by PBPs. Leal laboratory fully identified the first odorant-degrading enzymes from moths and scarab beetles. In 2005, Leal coined the term “reverse chemical ecology” for employing olfactory proteins to identify semiochemicals of potential practical applications. Using this approach, he identified oviposition attractants for mosquitoes. His laboratory identified olfactory receptor neurons (ORNs) highly sensitive to nonanal, which might play a crucial role in Culex mosquitoes shifting from birds to humans, implicated in West Nile virus transmission. Leal and his collaborators identified mosquito ORNs sensitive to DEET and subsequently identified an odorant receptor, CquiOR136, sensitive to DEET and other commercially available insect repellents. Leal and collaborators discovered a receptor, CquiOR32, with dual inhibitory/excitatory properties manifested in the Xenopus oocyte recording system, in flies and mosquito behavior. Leal laboratory demonstrated for the first time that mosquitoes respond to carbon dioxide with a heterodimer formed by GR2 and GR3, not as GR1/GR3 as previously hypothesized. They also demonstrated that CO_{2} per se, not bicarbonate, activates these receptors. Leal is the author and co-author of more than 220 scientific articles.

== Major services to the scientific community ==
Leal served as Councilor and President of the International Society of Chemical Ecology. Along with Alvin Simmons, Leal served as co-chair of the 2016 International Congress of Entomology. At the beginning of the COVID pandemic, Leal organized a series of COVID symposia, which drew thousands of attendees. In 2021, he organized a symposium, "Insect Olfaction and Taste in 24 Hours Around the Globe", to provide a platform for young scholars to highlight their recent work and interact with other well-established scholars in the field.

== Awards ==
- Member of the National Academy of Sciences (2024)
- Honorary Member, Entomological Society of America
- Academic Senate's 2022 Distinguished Scholarly Public Service Award
- Distinguished Teaching Award for Undergraduate Teaching, UC Davis Academic Senate (2020)
- Award for Excellence in Teaching, Pacific Branch of the Entomological Society of America (2020)
- Founders’ Memorial Award, Entomological Society of America (2019)
- Fellow of the National Academy of Inventors (2019)
- Fellow of the California Academy of Sciences (2015)
- Honorary Fellow of the Royal Entomological Society (2015),
- Corresponding Member, Brazilian Academy of Sciences (2012)
- Silver Medal, International Society of Chemical Ecology (2012)
- Nan-Yao Su Award for Innovation and Creativity in Entomology (2011)
- Fellow of the Entomological Society of America (2008)
- Fellow of the American Association for the Advancement of Science (2005)
- Gakkai-show (Fellow-like award), Japanese Society of Applied Entomology and Zoology (1998)
- Entomological Society of Brazil Award, Medal of Achievement (1995)
- Gijitsusho (Technology Prize), Japan Society for Bioscience, Biotechnology & Agrochemistry (1994)
