= Yasuko Rikihisa =

Veterinary microbiologist

- Education: University of Tokyo (MS, PhD)
- Known for: Research on Ehrlichia, Anaplasma, and Neorickettsia; work on the molecular pathogenesis, culture, diagnosis, and prevention of tick-borne intracellular bacterial diseases
- Awards: Member, National Academy of Sciences
- Scientific career
- Fields: Veterinary microbiology, microbiology, infectious disease
- Workplaces: The Ohio State University, Virginia Tech, Harvard Medical School

Yasuko Rikihisa is a veterinary microbiologist known for research on obligate intracellular bacteria, especially species in the genera Ehrlichia, Anaplasma, and Neorickettsia. She is a Distinguished University Professor at The Ohio State University and has been affiliated with its College of Veterinary Medicine and Department of Microbiology. Her work has focused on the cell biology, pathogenesis, cultivation, diagnosis, and prevention of tick-borne and other vector-borne zoonotic infections affecting animals and humans.

== Education and career ==
Rikihisa earned an MS in 1972 and a PhD in 1977 from the University of Tokyo. She then completed postdoctoral training at Harvard Medical School from 1977 to 1981. She joined the Virginia-Maryland College of Veterinary Medicine at Virginia Tech, where she served as assistant professor and director of the electron microscope facility, before moving to The Ohio State University in 1986. At Ohio State she became professor in 1991 and was named Distinguished University Professor in 2014.

== Research ==
Rikihisa's research has centered on the biology of tick-borne intracellular bacteria that infect leukocytes, particularly Ehrlichia chaffeensis and Anaplasma phagocytophilum. A 1996 review in Emerging Infectious Diseases described her laboratory as a major contributor to advances in the scientific investigation of ehrlichiae. Her later reviews summarized how these pathogens invade host cells, manipulate membrane trafficking and autophagy, acquire nutrients, and avoid innate immune defenses.

One of the laboratory's findings was that E. chaffeensis and A. phagocytophilum lack genes for lipid A biosynthesis and depend on host-derived cholesterol for survival. This work helped define these pathogens as unusual gram-negative bacteria with highly reduced envelope biosynthetic capacity and strong dependence on host lipids.

Another finding from the Rikihisa laboratory was the identification of the Ehrlichia surface invasin EtpE and its host receptor pathway. In 2013, the group showed that EtpE binds the host cell-surface protein DNase X and triggers bacterial entry into mammalian cells. In 2015, they further showed that this entry mechanism recruits CD147 and hnRNP-K and activates N-WASP-dependent actin polymerization.

Rikihisa's group also showed how E. chaffeensis manipulates host endosomal trafficking and autophagy through secreted type IV secretion system effectors. In 2016, the laboratory reported that the effector Etf-1 induces RAB5- and class III phosphatidylinositol 3-kinase-dependent autophagy to obtain nutrients for bacterial growth. In 2018, they reported that Etf-2 binds active RAB5 and delays endosome maturation, helping the pathogen avoid lysosomal destruction.

In work on A. phagocytophilum, the Rikihisa laboratory identified the effector Ats-1 as a bacterial protein that is imported into host cell mitochondria and interferes with apoptosis induction. This study showed that the pathogen can prolong host-cell survival by directly targeting mitochondrial pathways.

Rikihisa and collaborators also helped to establish Ehrlichia japonica as a model organism for severe ehrlichiosis. In 2021, comparative genomic analysis of Ehrlichia sp. HF supported its classification as Ehrlichia japonica sp. nov. and emphasized its value as a model for fatal human ehrlichiosis. Subsequent work using E. japonica mutants showed that TRP120 promotes sustained bacteremia and tick acquisition, and that RipE contributes to extracellular resistance, virulence, and protection-associated immune responses in mice.

== Honors and recognition ==
Rikihisa was elected to the National Academy of Sciences in 2012. She was elected a Fellow of the American Association for the Advancement of Science in 2005, a Fellow of the American Academy of Microbiology in 2009, and a Fellow of the National Academy of Inventors in 2014. In 2015, Rikihisa was elected a Fellow of the National Academy of Inventors.

Rikihisa received Ohio State University's Innovator of the Year Award in 2011 for translational research and commercialization related to tick-borne disease diagnostics. In 2018 she received the International Award of the International Canine Health Awards, presented by The Kennel Club Charitable Trust for her work on tick-borne diseases affecting dogs and humans. Rikihisa holds the Stanton Youngberg Endowed Professorship in Veterinary Medicine.

== Selected publications ==
- Lin, Mingqun; Rikihisa, Yasuko (2003). "Ehrlichia chaffeensis and Anaplasma phagocytophilum lack genes for lipid A biosynthesis and incorporate cholesterol for their survival". Infection and Immunity. 71 (9): 5324–5331. doi:10.1128/IAI.71.9.5324-5331.2003. PMC 187327. PMID 12933880.
- Niu, Hua; Kozjak-Pavlovic, Vera; Rudel, Thomas; Rikihisa, Yasuko (2010). "Anaplasma phagocytophilum Ats-1 is imported into host cell mitochondria and interferes with apoptosis induction". PLOS Pathogens. 6 (2) e1000774. doi:10.1371/journal.ppat.1000774. PMC 2824752. PMID 20174550.
- Rikihisa, Yasuko (2010). "Anaplasma phagocytophilum and Ehrlichia chaffeensis: subversive manipulators of host cells". Nature Reviews Microbiology. 8 (5): 328–339. doi:10.1038/nrmicro2318. PMID 20372158.
- Mohan Kumar, Dipu; Lin, Mingqun; Xiong, Qingming; Niu, Hua; Rikihisa, Yasuko (2013). "Ehrlichia chaffeensis uses its surface protein EtpE to bind GPI-anchored protein DNase X and trigger entry into mammalian cells". PLOS Pathogens. 9 (11) e1003666. doi:10.1371/journal.ppat.1003666. PMC 3789761. PMID 24098122.
- Lin, Mingqun; Liu, Hongyan; Xiong, Qingming; Niu, Hua; Cheng, Zhihui; Yamamoto, Akitsugu; Rikihisa, Yasuko (2016). "Ehrlichia secretes Etf-1 to induce autophagy and capture nutrients for its growth through RAB5 and class III phosphatidylinositol 3-kinase". Autophagy. 12 (11): 2145–2166. doi:10.1080/15548627.2016.1217369. PMC 5103349.
- Yan, Qi; Lin, Mingqun; Huang, Weiyan; Teymournejad, Omid; Johnson, Jennifer M; Hays, Franklin A.; Liang, Zhimin; Li, Guangpu; Rikihisa, Yasuko (2018). "An Ehrlichia type IV secretion system effector Etf-2 binds to active RAB5 and delays endosome maturation". Proceedings of the National Academy of Sciences of the United States of America. 115 (38): E8977–E8986. Bibcode:2018PNAS..115E8977Y. doi:10.1073/pnas.1806904115. PMC 6156607. PMID 30181274.
- Lin, Mingqun; Xiong, Qingming; Chung, Matthew; Daugherty, Sean C.; Nagaraj, Sushima; Sengamalay, Naomi; Ott, Sandra; Godinez, Al; Tallon, Luke J.; Sadzewicz, Lisa; Fraser, Claire; Dunning Hotopp, Julie C.; Rikihisa, Yasuko (2021). "Comparative analysis of genome of Ehrlichia sp. HF, a model bacterium to study fatal human ehrlichiosis". Pathogens. 10 (1): 58. doi:10.1186/s12864-020-07309-z. PMC 7789307. PMID 33407096.
- Zhang, Tsian; Chien, Rory C.; Budachetri, Khemraj; Lin, Mingqun; Boyaka, Prosper N.; Huang, Weiyan; Rikihisa, Yasuko (2024). "Ehrlichia effector TRP120 manipulates bacteremia to facilitate tick acquisition". mBio. 15 (4): e00476-24. doi:10.1128/mbio.00476-24. PMID 38501870.
- Chien, Rory C.; Lin, Mingqun; Duan, Nan; Denton, Steve; Kawahara, Jeffrey; Rikihisa, Yasuko (2024). "RipE expression correlates with high ATP levels in Ehrlichia, which confers resistance during the extracellular stage to facilitate a new cycle of infection". Frontiers in Cellular and Infection Microbiology. 14 1416577. doi:10.3389/fcimb.2024.1416577. PMID 39411319.

== See also ==
- Ehrlichiosis
- Human monocytic ehrlichiosis
- Anaplasmosis
- Rickettsiales
