= George B. Craig =

American biologist and entomologist

- Born: July 8, 1930; Chicago, USA
- Died: December 21, 1995 (aged 65); Las Vegas, USA
- Education: University of Illinois
- Known for: genetics of mosquito; vector biology
- Scientific career
- Doctoral advisor: William R. Horsfall
- Notable students: Monica Asman

George Brownlee Craig Jr. (July 8, 1930 — December 21, 1995) was an American biologist and entomologist, the Clark Professor of Biology at the University of Notre Dame, a member of the National Academy of Sciences and a recipient of the National Institutes of Health Merit Award.

The New York Times called Craig "one of the world's foremost experts on mosquitoes".

The National Academies Press called him "an internationally recognized expert on the biology and control of mosquitoes" and that his "contributions made ... to medical entomology are almost incalculable".

== Education and personal life ==
Craig was born in Chicago. He studied for his B.A. degree at the University of Indiana. He then moved to University of Illinois where he studied for a master's degree in entomology University of Illinois in 1952. He was introduced to mosquitoes by William R. Horsfall and continued there, gaining his Ph.D. in 1956. In 1995 he died at an Entomological Society of America conference in Las Vegas.

== Career ==
In 1957 he was appointed to University of Notre Dame and became a full professor in 1964 and then the named the Clark Professor of Biology in 1974.

Craig's scientific interests were in entomology and vector biology, when the latter was a new concept. He also was among the first to apply genetics to mosquitoes, specifically Aedes aegypti. He began mapping morphological traits. His research group, the Vector Biology Laboratory, identified nine by 1962 and by 1967 had constructed a linkage map with 28 alleles assigned to the mosquito's three chromosome pairs. These, and further markers, were essential for developments in understanding the insect's ecology and population genetics. Researchers who had worked with Craig and his group, or taken the programme he developed to train field biologists, formed the nucleus of vector biology applications and developments in the US and other countries. The World Health Organization's collection of medically important Aedes was housed with his research group.

== Awards and honours ==
Craig was the first member of academic staff at University of Notre Dame to be elected to the National Academy of Sciences. In 1993 he was awarded the Walter Reed Medal from the American Society of Tropical Medicine and Hygiene.
