= Sue VandeWoude =

American veterinarian and researcher

Academic background
- Education: California Institute of Technology
- Alma mater: Virginia-Maryland College of Veterinary Medicine

Academic work
- Discipline: Veterinary medicine
- Sub-discipline: Feline viral diseases
- Institutions: Colorado State University

Susan VandeWoude is an American veterinarian and researcher specializing in viral diseases of cats. She is currently serving as the Dean of Colorado State University's College of Veterinary Medicine and Biomedical Sciences and is a member of the National Academy of Sciences.

== Education and career ==
VandeWoude grew up in Berryville, Virginia and received her B.S. in chemistry from the California Institute of Technology. She graduated with her Doctor of Veterinary Medicine (DVM) degree in 1986 from the Virginia-Maryland College of Veterinary Medicine. She completed her post-doctoral fellowship at Johns Hopkins University School of Medicine, where she studied the virus associated with Borna disease. She joined the faculty of Colorado State University in 1990 and became a Diplomate of the American College of Laboratory Animal Medicine in 1991. She held the position of Director of Laboratory Animal Resources at Colorado State University from 2007 to 2011 and has been the Associate Dean for Research within the College of Veterinary Medicine and Biomedical Sciences. In July 2020, she assumed the position as the director of the Colorado State University One Health Institute, after completion of a Fulbright research scholarship at the University of Tasmania in Australia.

In July 2022, VandeWoude became the 11th dean of the College of Veterinary Medicine and Biomedical Sciences at Colorado State University. She was the first woman to be appointed as dean of the college. At that time, she stepped down from the CSU One Health Institute position.

== Research interests ==
VandeWoude studies viruses including Feline Immunodeficiency Virus, Feline Leukemia Virus, and Feline Foamy Virus that infect both domestic cats and wild felids, such as bobcats and pumas. She also studies the ecology of infectious disease in felines and cross-species transmission, as well as laboratory animal medicine.

== Honors and awards ==
She has previously served as President of the American College of Laboratory Animal Medicine and the American Society of Laboratory Animal Practitioners. She has also been involved with leadership for the American Association of Veterinary Medical Colleges and the American Veterinary Medical Association. VandeWoude was elected to the National Academy of Sciences in 2019.

VandeWoude was awarded the 2019 CVMBS Diversity and Inclusion Award and the 2020 CVMBS Collaboration Award, both by Colorado State University. Other awards include the American Association of Veterinary Medical Colleges Excellence in Research Award, the Virginia Maryland College of Veterinary Medicine's Lifetime Achievement Alumni Award, and the American College of Laboratory Animal Medicine Comparative Medicine Scientist Award.

As of 2025, VandeWoude is a University Distinguished Professor of Comparative Medicine at Colorado State University.
