= 2024 King's Birthday Honours (Australia) =

Annual honours in Australia

The 2024 King's Birthday Honours for Australia were announced on 10 June 2024 by the Governor-General, David Hurley.

The Birthday Honours are appointments by some of the 15 Commonwealth realms of King Charles III to various orders and honours to reward and highlight good works by citizens of those countries. The Birthday Honours are awarded as part of the King's Official Birthday celebrations during the month of June.

== Order of Australia ==
Order of Australia civil ribbon

Order of Australia military ribbon

=== Companion of the Order of Australia (AC) ===
==== General Division ====
- The Honourable Daniel Michael Andrews – For eminent service to the people and Parliament of Victoria, to public health, to policy and regulatory reform, and to infrastructure development.
- Professor Karen Canfell – For eminent service to medicine as an epidemiologist, particularly through cancer research, to tertiary education, and as a mentor and leader.
- The late the Honourable Simon Findlay Crean – For eminent service to the people and Parliament of Australia, to tertiary education, to business, and to industrial relations.
- Mark McGowan – For eminent service to the people and Parliament of Western Australia, to public health and education, and to international trade relations.
- Sir Jonathan Mills, AO – For eminent service to international cultural leadership and diplomacy, to the performing arts, to philanthropic ventures, and to tertiary education.
- Samantha Joy Mostyn, AO – For eminent service in the social justice, gender equity, sporting, cultural and business sectors, to reconciliation, and to environmental sustainability.

=== Officer of the Order of Australia (AO) ===
==== General Division ====
- The Honourable Kevin Harcourt Bell, AM KC – For distinguished service to the judiciary, to the law, and to human rights through education and reform.
- The Honourable Gregory Ivan Combet, AM – For distinguished service to the people and Parliament of Australia, and to the banking and superannuation industries.
- Professor Ross Leon Coppel – For distinguished service to science as a microbiologist, to tertiary education, to board and advisory roles, and to innovation.
- Professor Jo Anne Douglass – For distinguished service to medical research, to clinical immunology and allergy, to respiratory medicine, and to tertiary education.
- Professor John Barton Furness – For distinguished service to medical research in the field of autonomic neuroscience and neurogastroenterology.
- Emeritus Professor Suzanne Joan Hand – For distinguished service to palaeontology and zoology, particularly as a fossil bat and marsupial researcher, and to tertiary education.
- The late Sir James Gilbert Hardy – For distinguished service to yachting, to the business sector, to charitable organisations, and to the community.
- Dr Gillian Anne Hirth – For distinguished service to environmental science, particularly radiation and nuclear safety, and to the development of national and international regulatory standards.
- Professor Thomas Maschmeyer – For distinguished service to science as a researcher, innovator and educator, and business through pioneering commercial technologies.
- Glenn Donald McGrath, AM – For distinguished service to community health through breast cancer support, and to cricket as an international coach.
- Professor Donald Nutbeam – For distinguished service to public health, to tertiary education, and to professional associations and boards.
- Laureate Professor Kate Amanda Smith-Miles – For distinguished service to tertiary education, to applied mathematical research, and as a role model and advocate for women in STEM.
- Jane Susan Tewson – For distinguished service to the community through social enterprise endeavours, to the not-for- profit sector, and as an entrepreneur.
- The late Kevin Ernest Weldon, AM – For distinguished service to international and national surf life saving, to publishing, to animal welfare, and to philanthropic endeavours.
- Felicity June Young – For distinguished service to public health, particularly to those living with HIV/AIDS, and to gender equality and human rights.

==== Military Division ====
Navy

- Rear Admiral Justin Garred Jones, CSC RAN – For distinguished service to the Royal Australian Navy in significant command positions.

Army

- Major General Matthew Richard Pearse, AM – For distinguished service in responsible positions as Commander 1st Brigade and Commander Forces Command.
- Major General Anthony John Rawlins, DSC AM – For distinguished service in responsible positions as the Deputy Chief of Army and Head Force Design Division.

=== Member of the Order of Australia (AM) ===
==== General Division ====
- Peter James Agnew, ESM – For significant service to surf lifesaving as an administrator, official, and educator.
- Margaret Ann Allison – For significant service to public administration, and to the community.
- Suzanne Maree Ardagh – For significant service to business, to the arts, and to the community.
- Dr John Aspley Davis – For significant service to veterinary science, and to professional associations.
- Dr Bronwyn Maree Bancroft – For significant service to the arts, and to the Indigenous community.
- Dr Amanda Baric – For significant service to anaesthesiology, to pain medicine, and to tertiary education.
- Dr Janice Margaret Bell – For significant service to general practice medicine, and to medical education and training.
- Craig Anthony Bennett – For significant service to health administration in leadership and advisory roles.
- Daniel Benjamin Besen – For significant service to the arts, and to philanthropy.
- Peter John Blunden – For significant service to journalism, particularly through print media, and to the community.
- Emeritus Professor Elivio Bonollo – For significant service to tertiary education, particularly industrial design research and development.
- His Honour Judge Michael Patrick Bourke – For significant service to the judiciary, to the law, and to the community of Melbourne.
- Dr George Patrick Bridger – For significant service to medicine through otolaryngology head and neck surgery.
- Emeritus Professor Thea Charlotte Brown – For significant service to social welfare, particularly through family violence and child protection research.
- Michael Paul Burgess – For significant service to public administration, particularly national security and intelligence.
- Emeritus Professor Michael Walter Buxton – For significant service to urban and environmental planning, to tertiary education, and to the community.
- Robin Jean Campbell – For significant service to arts administration, and to the community.
- Brianna Casey – For significant service to social welfare, to environmental conservation, and to the community.
- Kathy Cavanagh – For significant service to women's affairs, and to the community.
- The late Ruth Alicia Charlton – For significant service to the law, particularly dispute resolution and mediation.
- Professor Kathleen Frances Clapham – For significant service to Indigenous community health, to anthropology, and to tertiary education.
- John Andrew Collins – For significant service to the arts through music, and to the community.
- Dr Laurie Margaret Cowled – For significant service to philanthropy in the arts, education and health sectors, and to women.
- Clinical Associate Professor John Stanley Cullen – For significant service to geriatric medicine as a clinician, researcher, health innovator and advocate.
- Conjoint Professor Jacqueline Eve Curtis – For significant service to medicine, particularly as a mental health clinician and researcher.
- Roslyn Curtis – For significant service to education, and to professional associations.
- Steven Sydney Davis – For significant service to science, particularly through veterinary virology research.
- Dr John Kees De Groot – For significant service to the law, to tertiary education, and to the community.
- Dr Sherene Devanesen – For significant service to community health through governance and administrative roles.
- Professor Katina D'Onise – For significant service to public health through translational research, and policy and legislative reform.
- Lewis Rolf Driver – For significant service to the judiciary, and to the law.
- Dr Kathleen Margaret Eagar – For significant service to community through health services research and development, and as a mentor.
- Vanessa Marie Elliott – For significant service to the Indigenous community, to the mining industry, and to public administration.
- Clifford Neville Fleming – For significant service to business, and to the community of Bundaberg.
- Dr Eileen Gallery – For significant service to nephrology, to obstetric medicine, and to tertiary education.
- Dr Paul Lyttleton Gaudry – For significant service to emergency and forensic medicine, and to professional associations.
- The late Dr Arnold Gillespie – For significant service to medicine, particularly as an advocate for voluntary assisted dying.
- Christina Isabelle Gillies – For significant service to community health, and to business through governance and leadership roles.
- Professor Sharon Ruth Goldfeld – For significant service to paediatric medicine as a clinician and academic, and to public health research.
- The late Mr Jacob Kopel Goldstein – For significant service to medicine as a cardiothoracic surgeon, and as a surgical mentor.
- Professor Glen Anthony Gole – For significant service to ophthalmology, to tertiary education, and to professional organisations.
- Professor Emerita Heather Goodall – For significant service to tertiary education, particularly social science, and to the Indigenous community.
- Amanda Gordon – For significant service to psychology, and to the multicultural community.
- Ian Rodney Grace – For significant service to radio, and to the music industry.
- Christopher Warren Hall – For significant service to psychology, particularly to grief and bereavement.
- Sharene Marie Hambur – For significant service to the Jewish community, and to the law.
- Philip Gregory Harrison – For significant service to youth, and to outdoor and environmental education.
- Professor Elizabeth Hartland – For significant service to medical research, particularly microbiology, and to tertiary education.
- Gerard John Hayes – For significant service to industrial relations, particularly through the trade union sector, and to emergency service organisations.
- Robyn-Lyn Henderson – For significant service to public administration, and to social welfare.
- Dr Geoffrey David Higgins – For significant service to medicine through clinical virology testing technology, and to microbiology.
- The Honourable Justice Graham Eric Hiley, RFD – For significant service to the judiciary, to the law, and to the Indigenous community.
- George Everard Hill – For significant service to the culinary industry as a chef and educator, and to the community.
- Associate Professor Anthony David Holley – For significant service to intensive care and emergency medicine.
- Dr Sonja Hood – For significant service to community through social welfare organisations, and to sports administration.
- Ted Walter Huber – For significant service to defence through science and technology development.
- Associate Professor Christine Jeffries – For significant service as a paediatrician, to rural and remote medicine, and to the Indigenous community.
- Dr Ida Kaplan – For significant service to community health, particularly within trauma recovery.
- Anita Blanche Keelan – For significant service to netball as a coach and administrator.
- Robert James Kelly – For significant service to tertiary education, to the law, and to medical administration.
- Professor Elizabeth Kendall – For significant service to rehabilitation research, to people with disability, and to tertiary education.
- Sister Jane Irene Keogh – For significant service to the community through social welfare advocacy, and to primary education.
- Dr Pauline Kerr – For significant service to tertiary education, and to international diplomatic relations.
- Professor Lisa Kervin – For significant service to tertiary education, and to research in early childhood digital literacy.
- The late Mr Sydney George Kinsman – For significant service to the community of Alice Springs.
- Alison Mary Kitchen – For significant service to business, to governance roles, and to the community.
- Linda Maree Kochanski – For significant service to the law, particularly dispute resolution, and to tertiary education.
- Lynn Smith Kraus – For significant service to business and commerce, to gender equality, and to the community.
- Stephen Anthony Large – For significant service to historical site preservation, and to the community of the Tasman Peninsula.
- Tim Low – For significant service to conservation, and to environmental education and awareness.
- The Honourable Ann Majella Lyons – For significant service to the judiciary, to the law, and to the community.
- Richard James Marks – For significant service to rugby as a player, coach, and administrator.
- Professor Brett Michael McDermott – For significant service to medicine in the field of child and adolescent psychiatry.
- Denis William McLeod – For significant service to the law, to urban planning, and to the community of Western Australia.
- Robyn Leigh McLeod – For significant service to the community through social welfare and governance roles.
- Daniel Robert Meltz – For significant service to the law, particularly through international arbitration and dispute resolution.
- Julie Gay Millard – For significant service to the mental health sector.
- Catherine Anne Money, PSM – For significant service to leather research, and to environmental conservation.
- Dr Brendan Joseph Moore – For significant service to anaesthesiology, and to pain medicine.
- Sister Isobel Moran – For significant service to medicine, and to the church.
- Dr James Alexander Mullins – For significant service to science, and to the community through an emergency response organisation.
- Conjoint Professor Tracey Anne O'Brien – For significant service to cancer medicine, to medical research and education, and to professional bodies.
- David Charles Olsson – For significant service to Australia China business relations, and to the law.
- Professor Gretta Pecl – For significant service to science, particularly ecological research, and to tertiary education.
- Emeritus Professor Michael Paul Pender – For significant service to medicine, particularly neurology and multiple sclerosis research, and to tertiary education.
- Darren Walter Pennay – For significant service to social and behavioural research, and to population survey method development.
- Concetta Perna – For significant service to the Australian Italian community.
- Dr William James Pigott – For significant service to conservation and the environment, to medical education, and to international community health.
- Dr Winston Frank Ponder – For significant service to scientific research, particularly invertebrate and conservation biology.
- Pamela Muriel Pritchard – For significant service to the community, to social welfare, and to primary education.
- Associate Professor Carolyn Quadrio – For significant service to psychiatry as a clinician, academic and mentor.
- Professor Helen Kathryn Reddel – For significant service to respiratory medicine, and to medical research.
- Valma Fay Reeve – For significant service to the community in a range of roles and organisations.
- The Reverend Dr Charles Richard Ringma – For significant service to theology, to the community, and to youth.
- Clinical Associate Professor Christine Philippa Rodda – For significant service to paediatric endocrinology, to medical research, and to tertiary education.
- Peter Alan Rossdeutscher – For significant service to business, to digital inclusion, and to the innovation and technology commercialisation sectors.
- Nicolette Liesbeth Rubinsztein – For significant service to business, particularly the finance and commerce sectors.
- Annette Ruhotas Morgan – For significant service to the community, particularly through for-purpose organisations and governance roles.
- Professor David McRae Russell – For significant service to general medicine, to clinical education, and as a mentor.
- Sarina Russo – For significant service to business, to the community, and to vocational education and training.
- Professor Una Ryan – For significant service to tertiary education, to biochemistry, and to parasitology.
- Professor Gregory Michael Scalia – For significant service to cardiology as a clinician, academic and mentor.
- Conjoint Associate Professor James Patrick Scurry – For significant service to anatomical pathology, to women's health, and to professional societies.
- Dr Diana Bronwen Semmonds – For significant service to ophthalmology, to regulatory bodies, and to professional organisations.
- Patricia Joy Sibraa – For significant service to softball as an umpire and administrator.
- Christine Sinclair – For significant service to squash as an administrator and referee.
- Professor John Howard Skerritt – For significant service to public health administration and governance, and to scientific research.
- The Honourable Jillian Gell Skinner – For significant service to the people and Parliament of New South Wales, and to community health.
- Michael John Smith – For significant service to geological and earth sciences.
- Ray Sputore – For significant service to business, and to the construction industry.
- Anne Maree Stanfield – For significant service to community social welfare organisations.
- Raymond Anthony Steele – For significant service to cricket as a player, coach, and administrator.
- Professor Andrew Thomas Stephen – For significant service to business marketing research and development.
- Elizabeth Anne Taylor – For significant service to the community through domestic violence initiatives and organisations.
- Professor Jane Elizabeth Tomnay – For significant service to sexual and reproductive health medicine, and as a mentor.
- Mark Hayden Turra – For significant service to community health through pathology, particularly microbiology and infectious diseases.
- Dr Colin Croft Twelftree, OAM – For significant service to orthodontics, to education, and to professional associations.
- Professor Peter Vernon Van Heerden – For significant service to intensive care medicine, to professional associations, and to tertiary education.
- Leonard Stanley Vary – For significant service to the philanthropic sector, to the LGBTIQA+ community, and to the arts.
- Jocelyn Walker – For significant service to business, and to the community through philanthropic endeavours.
- Alexander James Ward – For significant service to the legal profession, and to the arts.
- Emeritus Professor Ronald Arthur Weber – For significant service to tertiary education, to accounting and information system development, and to professional associations.
- The Honourable Robert James Webster – For significant service to the people and Parliament of New South Wales, and to business.
- David Guthrie Willersdorf – For significant service to the community of the Greater Dandenong region.
- Clinical Professor Daryl Lindsay Williams – For significant service to anaesthesiology and pain medicine.
- Dr Beres Carmel Woodhead – For significant service to general practice medicine, particularly in board leadership roles, and to the community.
- Talal Yassine, OAM – For significant service to business, and to the community.
- Professor Konstantin Yastrebov – For significant service to intensive and critical care medicine, and to tertiary education.

==== Military Division ====
Army

- Colonel B – For exceptional service to Special Operations Command across a range of senior staff appointments from January 2015 to August 2023.
- Brigadier Brendan Shannon Casey – For exceptional service to the Australian Army Reserve as Commander of the 8th Brigade, Commander of Operation AGED CARE ASSIST and as the Australian Army’s Adjutant General.
- Brigadier James Andrew Davis, CSC – For exceptional service supporting the future design and employment of the Australian Defence Force, as Commanding Officer of the 2nd Cavalry Regiment, Director Chief of Army’s Initiatives Group, Director Joint Futures and Concepts, and Director General Future Land Warfare.
- Brigadier Duncan Leslie Hayward, CSC – For exceptional service in reforming recruiting practices to build an adaptable, scalable, modern recruiting system for the generation of Australian Defence Force capability.
- Brigadier Natasha Lea Ludwig – For exceptional service towards the development of Army logistics capability as Director of Logistics – Army and as Commander of the 17th Sustainment Brigade.
- Brigadier Paul Edward Smith – For exceptional service as Deputy Judge Advocate General – Army.

Air Force

- Air Commodore Veronica Marjory Tyler – For exceptional service in personnel capability management, supply assurance, enterprise resource planning, and joint logistics development.

==== General Division – Honorary ====
- Paul John Scott – For significant service to emergency response organisations through mental health support.

=== Medal of the Order of Australia (OAM) ===
==== General Division ====
- Inga Marianne (Eckerström)-Fancelli – For service to education, and to the Swedish community.
- Gregory Lawrence Aldridge – For service to community health.
- Madeline Edith Allen – For service to community sport, particularly netball.
- Anita Ilze Anderson (Apsitis) – For service to the Latvian community of Australia.
- David Vincent Archbold – For service to athletics in New South Wales.
- Wilhelmina Lara Armstrong – For service to the community of East Gippsland.
- Cameron Guy Arnold – For service to tourism, and to conservation.
- Gillian Beaudricourte Avery – For service to the community through charitable organisations.
- Effie Bacalakis – For service to the community of the Cairns region.
- Michael Dylan Bailey – For service to business and industry in Tasmania.
- Jason David Ball – For service to the community through social inclusion initiatives.
- Brigadier Neale Edmund Bavington RFD ED (Retd) – For service to veterans, and to the community.
- John Joseph Baynie – For service to emergency response organisations, and to the community.
- Paul James Beech ASM – For service to the community of Harvey.
- Judith Barbara Bissland – For service to vocational education, and to the community.
- Veronica Mary Blair – For service to the community, particularly through the church.
- Hamish Donald Blake – For service to the arts as an entertainer, and to the community.
- Ernest Noel Blake – For service to veterans and their families, and to the community.
- Kalman Bloch – For service to the community through Lions International.
- Elizabeth Kathleen Bobeff (Saunders) – For service to community health, particularly asylum seekers.
- Kerry Michael Bolger – For service to education.
- Lance Raymond Boswell – For service to the communities of Albury and Howlong.
- Helen Claire Botham – For service to childhood literacy, and to historical preservation.
- Colleen Joanne Boucher – For service to the community of Cobar.
- Barbara Ann Bowen – For service to the community of Canberra.
- Professor Asha Clare Bowen – For service to medicine in the field of clinical diseases.
- Claire Louise Braund – For service to women in business, and to the community of the Central Coast.
- John Charles Brooks – For service to the community of Scone.
- Suzanne May Brooks – For service to the LGBTQIA+ community, and to women in business.
- Mary-Ann Brown – For service to local government, and to the communities of Dunkeld and Hamilton.
- Dr Penny Browne – For service to medicine as a general practitioner.
- Kay Elanor Bryan – For service to the arts community, and to education, through philanthropic contributions.
- David John Bryant – For service to the community through a range of organisations.
- Suzanne Bulger – For service to the community of Tumut.
- Eric Walter Bumpstead – For service to the community of the Cardinia region.
- Carol Ann Bunton – For service to sport, particularly netball.
- Allison Burns – For service to community health standards.
- Judith Beatrice Caldwell – For service to the community of Cooma.
- Evelyn Callaghan – For service to early childhood education.
- Peter James Camp – For service to the livestock industry.
- Judith Rose Capovilla – For service to netball.
- The late Mr Paul Carter – For service to the community through emergency response organisations.
- Michelle Challis – For service to the communities of Geelong and Ballarat.
- Raymond Francis Chappell – For service to the community, and to state and local government.
- Gwendoline May Chisholm – For service to the community of Berrigan.
- Alexander John Clark – For service to people who are deaf or hard of hearing, and to the community.
- Dr Belinda Edith Clarke (Hunter) – For service to medicine, particularly pathology.
- Noel Terence Clement – For service to the community through charitable organisations.
- Anthony James Coen – For service to railway preservation, and to pipe band music.
- Morna Mary Colbran – For service to the community through social welfare organisations.
- Phillip Charles Collins – For service to primary industry, and to the community of Lockington.
- Rhona Carol Collinson – For service to the community of Caboolture.
- Charles Denham Cooke – For service to the Scottish community of New South Wales.
- Mary Elizabeth Coriakula (Parfrey) – For service to the community through a range of roles.
- Martin Henry Corkery – For service to youth through early education, and to the community.
- Josephine Patricia Cornish – For service to the community of Beechworth.
- Alan James Coulter – For service to community sport.
- Lynette Ann Cregan – For service to the community of Glen Innes.
- Gregory Leigh Crofts – For service to youth through Scouts.
- Michael Lawrence Cullen – For service to trade and international relations.
- David Cunningham – For service to the beef cattle industry, and to the Central Australian community.
- Norman John Cunningham – For service to youth through Scouts.
- Barbara Frances Daley – For service to the community of Bulimba.
- Laurel May Danzo – For service to the community through St John Ambulance.
- Robyn Mary Davidson – For service to adventure and exploration literature.
- Esther Valerie Davies – For service to community history, and to education.
- Lindsay Claire Davis – For service to surf lifesaving.
- Robert James Dean – For service to the community of Red Cliffs.
- The late Mr John Herbert Devine – For service to Australian rules football, and to the community of Tasmania.
- Kenneth Ronald Dixon – For service to youth, and to the community of the Central Coast.
- William Joseph Dobell – For service to veterans and their families.
- Heather Isabelle Doherty – For service to masters athletics.
- Dr Francis Richard Doughty – For service to veterinary science, and to the community.
- Scott Bruce Drummond – For service to the communities of Porongurup and Mount Barker.
- The Reverend Judith Patricia Edgar – For service to the Anglican Church of Australia, and to the community of Springsure.
- Ross James Edwards – For service to the community of Lockhart.
- Bachar El Haouli – For service to the Islamic community, to multiculturalism, and to Australian rules football.
- Dr James Edward Elder – For service to medicine as an ophthalmologist.
- Leigh William Evans – For service to softball, through international and national umpiring.
- Wiliam Edward Faint – For service to the community of Clermont.
- Susan Jane Ferguson – For service to community health.
- Alan Kimber Field – For service to the community through music, and to education.
- Margaret Josceline Findlater-Smith – For service to women's affairs in a range of organisations.
- Gwyneth Kaye Fitzgerald – For service to the community of Glen Eira.
- Reginald Terence Fitzpatrick – For service to the community of Lithgow. Vincent de Paul Society, Lithgow
- Kenneth James Forbes – For service to lawn bowls.
- John Francis Ford – For service to community health.
- Dr George Bryan Foster – For service to the Jewish community of New South Wales.
- John William Fradgley – For service to the community, to the Anglican Church in Australia, and to the law.
- Jeffrey Ewen Franklin – For service to athletics.
- Michael Munro Fraser – For service to the communities of Tweed Heads and Coolangatta.
- Tania Frazer – For service to music as a soloist and chamber musician.
- Alan Thomas Fry – For service to the communities of Cohuna and Leitchville.
- Raymond John Galliott – For service to veterans and their families.
- Heather Elizabeth Garnsey – For service to genealogy.
- Robert John Gartland – For service to the community of Geelong.
- Dr John Edward Gault – For service to the community of Bendigo.
- William Clifford Gee – For service to surf lifesaving, and to the community.
- Penelope Elizabeth Gillies – For service to athletics as a coach and competitor.
- Marlene Gilson – For service to the visual arts.
- Annette Linda Gladwin – For service to the Jewish community of Victoria.
- Jonathan Scott Gleeson – For service to martial arts.
- Farag Bassili Gobran – For service to youth, to aged welfare, and to the Egyptian community.
- Leonard George Goode – For service to the community of Sarina.
- Cecilia Rose Gore-Birch – For service to the Indigenous community of Western Australia.
- Kenneth Barnes Gourlay – For service to sailing.
- Laura Kathryn Greaves – For service to animal welfare.
- Valerie Lorraine Hall – For service to the community through a range of roles.
- The Honourable Shelley Elizabeth Hancock – For service to the people and Parliament of New South Wales.
- Malcolm Ronald Hansen – For service to the community through voluntary roles.
- Valerie Mary Hansen – For service to the community through voluntary roles.
- Suellen Hardie – For service to swimming as an official and administrator.
- Meryl Lesley Hare – For service to interior design.
- Barry Stewart Harley – For service to country music, and to the community of Tamworth.
- Cheryl Anne Harris – For service to the community of the Sunshine Coast.
- Dr Richard Brian Harrod – For service to emergency medicine.
- Richard John Harry – For service to the community through a range of organisations.
- Lance Richard Haslewood – For service to veterans and their families, and to the community.
- Denise Anne Heinjus – For service to nursing.
- John Francis Henderson – For service to the community of Inverell.
- Susan Jane Henderson – For service to the community of East Melbourne.
- Deborah Anne Henderson – For service to community health, particularly through cancer awareness.
- The late Mr Graydon Read Henning – For service to maritime history, and to tertiary education.
- Claire Marie Henshall – For service to the community of Warragul.
- Alan Francis Henson – For service to the community of Sydney.
- Margaret Smith Heslin – For service to the communities of Casey and Berwick.
- Shauna Hicks – For service to community history.
- The Reverend Dr Graham Joseph Hill – For service to theological education, and to the Baptist Churches of Australia.
- Niharika Suhas Hiremath – For service to community health.
- Mary Holt – For service to the conservation and the environment.
- Ian Holthouse – For service to veterans.
- John Harold Honeycombe – For service to community of North Queensland through a range of organisations.
- Donna Jane Hope – For service to the people and Parliament of Victoria, and to bowel cancer awareness.
- Ian Gordon Hughes – For service to the community of the Shoalhaven region.
- Kevin James Hughes BM – For service to the community through a range of organisations.
- Adele Hulse – For service to the community through a range of roles.
- Judith Margaret Hunter – For service to the community of the Lefevre Peninsula.
- Donald Ross Hurley – For service to model railways, and to rail history.
- Carolyn Elizabeth Ingvarson – For service to conservation, and to the community of Boroondara.
- Garry Keith Irvine – For service to Lions International, and to the community.
- Ronald Whitmore Irwin – For service to veterans and their families, and to local sport.
- Elisabeth Mary Jackson – For service to history preservation organisations, and to the community.
- The late Mr Kevin James Jackson – For service to the performing arts as a teacher.
- Yohanni Bey Johns – For service to tertiary education.
- Dr Richard David Johnson – For service to medicine, and to hospital administration.
- Peter Charles Johnson – For service to the community of the Shepparton region.
- Rosemary Liston Johnston – For service to the arts, and to the community.
- Henry Leonard Jones – For service to veterans, and to the community of Parramatta.
- Douglas Herbert Kaesler – For service to cycling.
- Kerrye Suzanne Katz – For service to judo, as a coach and athlete.
- Harinder Kaur – For service to the community through social welfare organisations.
- Professor Anne Marie Kavanagh – For service to medicine, particularly disability health research.
- Distinguished Professor Stuart Bruce Kaye – For service to international law, and to tertiary education.
- Geoffrey Brian Kaye – For service to education, particularly STEM.
- Neville John Kelly – For service to the community of New South Wales.
- Richard James Kennedy – For service to the community of Crookwell.
- Raymond Hunter Kidd – For service to the arts as a patron, and to oenology.
- Diana Margaret Kidd – For service to the arts, and to youth.
- Austin Suk-Hwan Kim – For service to the Korean community of New South Wales, and to the community.
- Judith Kathleen King – For service to secondary education.
- Norman Allan Kitto – For service to the communities of the Blue Mountains and Western Sydney.
- Cheryl Anne Kitto – For service to the communities of the Blue Mountains and Western Sydney, and to people with disability.
- Carolyn Joy Kitto – For service to the community through social justice initiatives.
- Barbara Knowles – For service to hockey.
- Audrey Koosmen – For service to animal welfare.
- Dr Chi Wing Lai – For service to medicine as a general practitioner, and to the community.
- Dr Buuloc Lam – For service to dentistry, and to humanitarian dental care.
- Dr Stephen Alan Langford – For service to medicine, to rural health, and to medical education.
- Prudence Ann Lawson – For service to the community through social welfare support.
- Dr Carl Le – For service to medicine in the motor sports industry.
- Jo-Ann Patricia Lees – For service to youth through Girl Guides.
- Michael Nicholas Litis – For service to the community through sports organisations.
- Rabbi Mendy Litzman – For service to the community through emergency response organisations.
- Jeanette Lockey – For service to the community of Tamborine Mountain.
- Jillian Kay Long – For service to hockey as an administrator and umpire.
- The late Professor Emeritus William John Louis – For service to medicine as a clinical pharmacologist.
- Susan Mary Love – For service to the community of Malmsbury.
- Angus Mackay – For service to philanthropy, to education, and to local sport.
- James Andrew MacLeod – For service to the community of Melbourne.
- Catia Malaquias – For service to people with disability.
- Dr Lynette Therese Masters – For service to medicine as a neuroradiologist.
- Ian Kevin Matthewson – For service to the community of Brisbane.
- Robert Armand Maul – For service to the community through emergency response organisations.
- Margaret Jane Maunsell – For service to business, and to the community of Cairns.
- Mark James McCafferty – For service to community health through cancer awareness programs.
- Paul Bradley McCann – For service to cricket.
- Maria Jeanette McConville – For service to athletics.
- Maureen Anne McInerney – For service to the community through social welfare roles.
- Lisa Anne McKenzie – For service to the community of Shepparton.
- The late Mr Brian Letham McKittrick – For service to secondary education.
- Michael Joseph McLaughlin – For service to the community of Violet Town.
- Garth Wallace McMillan – For service to the community through emergency response organisations.
- Janice Ann Mercer – For service to thoroughbred racing in the mid north coast region.
- The late Mr Mervyn James Mercer – For service to thoroughbred racing in the mid north coast region.
- Sister Helen Clifton Merrin – For service to special needs education, and to the Catholic Church in Australia.
- Dimitra Micos – For service to the Greek community of Sydney.
- Peter George Millington – For service to water conservation.
- Gino Monaco – For service to the Italian community of Fremantle.
- Edward Monaei – For service to the Indigenous community, particularly through sport.
- Clifton Barry Monaghan – For service to hockey.
- The late Mr Brian Carl Morelli – For service to veterans and their families, and to sports journalism.
- Dr Pauline Margaret Morgan – For service to the Catholic Church of Australia, and to education.
- Jennifer Lea Morris – For service to women through leadership and mentoring roles.
- Greg Munt – For service to the community through social welfare organisations.
- Robert George Nelson – For service to the communities of the mid north and the central coast.
- Sally Denene Neville – For service to the hospitality industry, and to business.
- Dr Anh Nguyen – For service to the Vietnamese community of Western Australia.
- Bich-Cam Nguyen – For service to the multicultural community of Victoria.
- Tuanh Nguyen – For service to the community through governance and advocacy roles.
- Marie Jeanette Nicholson – For service to music as a teacher and accompanist.
- Rabbi Jacqueline Ninio – For service to the Jewish community, and to interfaith organisations.
- Karen Elizabeth Noonan – For service to community music, and through emergency response organisations.
- Kai Noonan – For service to the LGBTIQ+ community, and to the domestic and family wellbeing sector.
- Joy Nugent – For service to nursing, particularly to palliative care.
- Catherine Maree Nugent – For service to country music, and to the community of Tamworth.
- Dr Mark Kevin O'Connor – For service to literature as a poet and educator.
- Stephen Mark O'Doherty – For service to the community through a range of organisations.
- The late Ms Clare O'Donnell – For service to community health through cancer awareness programs.
- Dr Janine Philippa O'Keeffe (Porter-Steele) – For service to nursing.
- Kristine Olaris – For service to the community of Victoria.
- Margaret Anne O'Leary – For service to military history.
- Kevin O'Neill – For service to football.
- Margaret Mary O'Rourke – For service to the community of Bendigo.
- Frank Gerard O'Shea – For service to international social welfare.
- Patrice Loretta O'Shea – For service to the environment, and to secondary education.
- Merrill Penelope Ovenden – For service to youth through Scouts.
- Malcolm Bruce Padgett – For service to business, and to the community.
- Nalika Priyadharshi Padmasena – For service to the multicultural community of New South Wales.
- Roger Page – For service to secondary education.
- William Palmer – For service to the community of the Hawkesbury.
- Reginald Ernest Palmer – For service to primary and secondary education.
- Maxwell William Papley – For service to the community of the Cardinia Shire.
- Donald Allan Papst – For service to the community of Horsham.
- Rhonda Joan Parker – For service to the community of Boyup Brook.
- Reginald Keith Parsons – For service to youth through Scouting.
- The late Mr Gavin Hamilton Patterson – For service to the community of Hervey Bay.
- Susan Margaret Pavish – For service to physical education.
- Rita Ann Peachey – For service to youth.
- Sam Pennisi – For service to the real estate industry, and to the community of Essendon.
- Dustin Ross Perry – For service to community health through the not-for-profit sector.
- The late Mr James Macklin Pfeiffer – For service to education, and to the Uniting Church in Australia.
- Pamela Gaye Phillips – For service to community health, and to international relations.
- Reginald Henry Pierce – For service to the communities of Wauchope and the Mid North Coast.
- Helen Nance Pittman – For service to the community through a range of organisations.
- The late Mr Robert Graham Porter – For service to the community of Officer.
- Associate Professor Sabaratnam Prathapan – For service to tertiary education, and to the community.
- Marie-Louise Marisa Previtera – For service to the Maltese community of New South Wales.
- Bassir Qadiri – For service to the multicultural community of Victoria.
- Ruth Elaine Rae – For service to the community of Somerville.
- Barbara Ramjan – For service to rowing, and to the law.
- Leonard Arthur Randell – For service to sailing, and to naval architecture.
- Janice Margaret Randles – For service to paralympic sports.
- Colin Roy Rathbone – For service to the community of Kiama.
- Domenico Rechichi – For service to the Italian community of Fremantle.
- James Rees – For service to the arts as an entertainer, and to the community.
- Distinguished Professor Andre Masumbuko Renzaho – For service to medical research, particularly refugee and migrant health.
- Dr Luz Estela de Fatima Restrepo Restrepo – For service to the multicultural community of Victoria.
- John Cyril Reynolds – For service to business.
- Catherine Mary Ringstad – For service to the community through social welfare roles.
- Sandy Roberts – For service to media as a sports commentator.
- Suzanne Roberts – For service to music, and to secondary education.
- Diana Jane Roberts – For service to the community of Nimbin.
- Dr Noel Clyde Robinson – For service to architecture.
- Evelyn Mona Robinson – For service to netball as an administrator, coach, and athlete.
- Dr Kathryn Minette Rodden – For service to conservation.
- Dr Jonathan Percy Rogers – For service to dentistry in a range of roles.
- Donna Maree Rousham – For service to people with disability.
- Ann Southcombe Rusden – For service to education, and to the community.
- Josephine Florence Rutley – For service to youth, and to the community.
- Maureen Anne Rutlidge – For service to the community of the Northern Beaches.
- Doreen Ruttledge – For service to the community of Southport.
- Dr William Robert Ryall – For service to conservation and the environment.
- Pat Ryan – For service to the community through social welfare organisations.
- Moira Therese Ryde – For service to people with disability.
- Rona Evelyn Sakko PSM – For service to science education.
- Margaret Sands – For service to the community of Leeton.
- Gail Mary Sellers – For service to the community of Gladstone.
- Peter Albert Senior – For service to golf.
- Kathy Sharon Shand – For service to the arts, and to the community.
- Trevor Robert Sharp – For service to the community of McLaren Vale.
- Nanette Gwendoline Sharp – For service to the community of southern Adelaide.
- Sandra Rae Sharp – For service to the community of McLaren Vale.
- Caroline Sharpen – For service to the performing arts through leadership roles.
- Letitia Molesworth Shelton – For service to the Royal Humane Society of Australasia.
- Fiona Shewring – For service to the building and construction industry.
- Robert Gregory Simms – For service to the Indigenous community of Western Sydney.
- Bernard James Sinnott – For service to the community of Camperdown.
- Maxwell Arthur Slee – For service to the community, particularly history preservation organisations.
- Dr David William Smith – For service to medicine in the field of microbiology.
- Dr Robyn Ada-Marie Smith-Walley – For service to the Indigenous community of Western Australia.
- Robin Peter Snowdon – For service to the community, and to Australian rules football.
- Dianne Margaret Spark – For service to the community of French Island.
- Dr David Speers – For service to medicine as a microbiologist.
- Emma Elizabeth Stanford – For service to Indigenous eye health.
- Dr Damien John Stark – For service to medicine in the field of microbiology.
- June Louise Stevens – For service to the community through social welfare organisations.
- Phillip Wasley Styles – For service to tourism in South Australia, and to the community.
- Kevin Raymond Sullivan – For service to veterans, and to the community.
- Helen Christine Summers – For service to the community of the Northern Territory, and to optometry.
- Beverley Sutherland Smith – For service to the culinary industry.
- Anthea Swann – For service to the community through a range of organisations.
- Kay Anne Taranto – For service to animal welfare.
- Colleen Mary Taylor – For service to public administration.
- Bee Ho Teow – For service to tourism, and to the community.
- Sakshi Sanjaya Thakur – For service to the community through social welfare organisations.
- Philip John Thomson – For service to the community of the Numinbah Valley.
- John William Thorpe – For service to the community of Gawler.
- Michael Eric Titley – For service to agriculture.
- Dr Rosalie Joy Triolo – For service to community and school history, and to tertiary education.
- Anne Elizabeth Tunks – For service to community health, particularly dementia support.
- Samantha Jane Turner – For service to nursing, and to the community.
- Walter John Tyson – For service to the community of the Bellingen Shire.
- Dr Laurence John Upfold – For service to people who are deaf or hard of hearing.
- Aunty Beryl Van Oploo – For service to the Indigenous community, and to the hospitality industry.
- Anne Esther Walker – For service to the community of Darwin.
- Lynette Walker (Guest) – For service to country music.
- Jennifer Anne Wallace – For service to special needs education.
- Wendy Jean Waller – For service to local government, and to the community of Liverpool.
- Paul Howard Warren – For service to the community of South West Sydney.
- Rhonda Joy Watt – For service to the community of Cumnock.
- Richard Leigh Watts – For service to the arts, and to the community of Victoria.
- The late Mr Nicholas John Way – For service to the media as a journalist, and to the community.
- Ian Clyde Westmoreland – For service to men's health, and to youth.
- Evelyn Joan White – For service to the community of the Goondiwindi region.
- Roger Charles Wilkinson – For service to the community, and to acoustic engineering.
- Cassandra Margaret Eilish Wilkinson – For service to the broadcast media, and to the community.
- Jennifer Dianne Willcox – For service to the community of the Shire of Manjimup.
- Barrie John Williams – For service to the law, and to the community.
- Leslie Charles Williams – For service to the community of Tasmania.
- Annie Williams – For service to the communities of Ravensthorpe and Jerdacuttup.
- Ruth Evelyn Wilson – For service to hot air ballooning.
- Elizabeth Carmyl Winkler – For service to the communities of Benalla and Tallangatta.
- Ann Winterton – For service to the community through social welfare organisations.
- Sister Janet Mary Woods – For service to secondary education, and to the Catholic Church in Australia.
- Lesley Ann Woolf – For service to Indigenous health, and to rural and remote nursing.
- Graeme Robert Worthington – For service to the community of the Sunraysia region.
- Jeanette Ellen Worthington – For service to the community of the Sunraysia region.
- Yvette Landau Zegenhagen – For service to international law.

==== Military Division ====
Navy

- Chief Petty Officer William James Carter – For performance of duty in the field of Navy Aviation Engineering and operational deployment support.
- Chief Petty Officer Patricia Anne Kelly – For performance of duty in the field of Navy Personnel Management.
- Captain Michael John Nipperess RAN – For performance of duty as the Executive Officer HMAS Kuttabul, Deputy Commander Shore Force and Commanding Officer HMAS Penguin.
- Commander Paul Daniel Pelczar RAN – For performance of duty as an intelligence officer in the Australian Defence Force.
- Captain Robin David Swift RAN – For meritorious service to the Royal Australian Navy in the fields of Maritime Warfare and Task Group operations.

Army

- Warrant Officer Class One Warrick Glen Butterworth – For meritorious service as a Regimental Sergeant Major and senior enlisted leader in the Australian Army.
- Lieutenant Colonel Jane Megan Evans – For meritorious service in the field of Defence financial management, and a transition support system for Australian Defence Force members.
- Warrant Officer Class One Cameron Michael Gee – For meritorious service and commitment across multiple appointments to the improvement of Army Geospatial Intelligence capability and cultural integration with the Australian Intelligence Corps.
- Major Kevin John Heyne – For meritorious service in the fields of safety, logistics and modernisation within the Australian Army Cadets.
- Warrant Officer Class One John Matthew Lines MG – For meritorious service over the course of successive Regimental Sergeant Major appointments.
- Warrant Officer Class Two Paul John Styles – For meritorious service to Indigenous recruitment and training in the Australian Defence Force.
- Warrant Officer Class One Craig Antony Webb – For meritorious service across multiple Regimental Sergeant Major positions in the Australian Army.

Air Force

- Warrant Officer J – For meritorious service in explosive ordnance safety and air transport in the Australian Defence Force.
- Flight Sergeant M – For meritorious service in the fields of airborne Electronic Warfare and Signals Intelligence.
- Wing Commander Matthew Peter Kelly – For meritorious service in Joint Logistics, Air Force Career Management and Initial Military Training capability development.

==== General Division – Honorary ====
- Giorgio Angele – For service to the restaurant and hospitality industry.
- Lee Lewis – For service to the performing arts as a theatre director.
- Noelle Eve Shader – For service to ballet.

== Meritorious Service ==
=== Public Service Medal (PSM) ===
Public Service Medal ribbon

Federal

- Susan Dorothy Bodell – For outstanding public service, contribution and achievement to Australia's interests in the Indo-Pacific region.
- Tamara Michelle Curll – For outstanding public service to the Australian Government and public through her sustained contribution to Australia's action on climate change.
- Dr Stephanie Davis – For outstanding public service through sustained leadership in supporting Australia's primary health care system throughout and beyond the COVID-19 pandemic.
- James Eynstone-Hinkins – For outstanding public service through his substantial contribution to the Australian Government in the field of data and statistics in public health, especially during the COVID-19 pandemic.
- Monique Hamilton – For outstanding public service in delivering significant and enduring reform in project and contract management.
- Jennifer Leanne Hazelton – For outstanding public service in delivering evidence-based food labelling standards and information for consumers.
- Leonie Holloway – For outstanding public service in leading the National Cultural Policy Taskforce to deliver Australia's first cultural policy in over a decade.
- Vidoshi Jana – For outstanding public service and dedication to public administration in leading the concept design, approval and establishment of the National Emergency Management Agency.
- Michelle Gaye Lees – For outstanding public service in the delivery of support and payments to Australian citizens in times of national emergencies and other critical events.
- David Charles Lewis – For outstanding public service in providing expert constitutional policy advice to all parts of the Australian Government.
- Fiona Rose Macdonald – For outstanding public service in customer service, policy and program design and service delivery.
- Dr Lindsey Mackay – For outstanding public service and commitment to advance chemical and biological measurements, particularly in anti-doping testing and intelligence gathering methods.
- Rachael Karen Moore – For outstanding public service in leading Australia's humanitarian, reconstruction and consular response as High Commissioner to the Kingdom of Tonga.
- Lauren Moran – For outstanding public service in jointly creating new, timely information on causes of deaths, by producing a range of mortality statistics to support COVID-19 responses.
- Abigael Emma Ogada-Osir – For outstanding public service in cultural diversity, particularly the Cultural Diversity Sprint Project.
- Dr Mark Andrew Schipp – For outstanding public service in improved outcomes for animal health and biosecurity in Australia and overseas.
- Dr Jodie Ward – For outstanding public service in advancing forensic human identification capabilities in Australia, particularly for the establishment of the Australian Federal Police National DNA Program for Unidentified and Missing Persons.

New South Wales

- Tish Dianne Bruce – For outstanding public service to NSW community health care.
- Belinda Lee Cashman – For outstanding public service to Aboriginal community health in Western Sydney.
- Perry Celestino – For outstanding public service to public education, particularly in innovation to support teaching.
- Kristie Clarke – For outstanding public service to residents of the Northern Rivers following the catastrophic floods in February 2022.
- Dr Malcolm Haddon – For outstanding public service in the promotion of multiculturalism, social cohesion and community harmony.
- Shane Hamilton – For outstanding public service to Aboriginal communities in NSW.
- Terry Joseph Knight – For outstanding public service to the Upper Lachlan Shire in the area of water and sewage operations.
- Sonia Marshall – For outstanding public service to the South Western Sydney Local Health District particularly in responding to the COVID-19 pandemic.
- Associate Professor Elisabeth Patricia Murphy – For outstanding public service to child and family health programs in NSW.
- Sharon Lea Pope – For outstanding public service to urban and regional planning in Muswellbrook Shire and the surrounding region.
- Marcus Ray – For outstanding public service to planning regulation in NSW.
- Malcolm Geoffrey Skewis – For outstanding public service to Stolen Generations survivors.
- Aunty Elizabeth Joyce Wright – For outstanding public service to education in Aboriginal languages.
- Dr John Murray Wright – For outstanding public service to psychiatric and mental health care in NSW.

Victoria

- Louise Galloway – For outstanding public service to primary and community health policy development in Victoria.
- Alexandra Greenwell – For outstanding public service in education and early childhood development.
- Donald Hough – For outstanding public service to the Victorian community through committed engagement and the delivery of projects.
- Jason Anthony Loos – For outstanding public service in the commercial structuring and delivery of infrastructure projects.
- Ryan William Phillips – For outstanding public service in fostering a safe and equitable justice system.
- Associate Professor Rex Pais Prabhu – For outstanding public service to regional medical services.
- William Arthur Whitford – For outstanding public service in the financial sector.

Queensland

- Graham John Atkins – For outstanding public service to housing industry in Queensland.
- Michele Fay Bauer – For outstanding public service to development in Queensland.
- Terry Paul Brennan – For outstanding public service to Queensland.
- Jon Douglas – For outstanding public service to Queensland.
- Shaun David Ferris – For outstanding public service in resources industry response to COVID-19.
- Gary McCahon – For outstanding public service to corrective services in New South Wales and Queensland.
- Michelle Gaye Wellington – For outstanding public service to disaster management and the COVID-19 response in Queensland.

Western Australia

- Deborah Anne Donation – For outstanding public service through supporting education outcomes for students of Wananami Remote Community School, and the development of local languages.
- Francine Michelle Eades – For outstanding public service through improving health outcomes for Aboriginal people during the COVID-19 pandemic.
- Dr Warrick Jeffrey Fletcher – For outstanding public service through fisheries research and the development and implementation of a holistic ecosystems-based approach to fisheries management.
- Marion June Hailes-Macdonald – For outstanding public service through leadership in the development and improvement of services and supports for people with disability, their families and carers.
- Lisa Mary Rodgers – For outstanding public service in support of the education community in Western Australia during the COVID-19 pandemic.
- Peter Sharp – For outstanding public service through leadership in the engagement of Aboriginal people in land management and advancing cultural change in government in Western Australia.

South Australia

- Sandra Bridgland – For outstanding public service in paediatric nursing specifically in eating disorder care.
- Samuel James Crafter – For outstanding public service in leading energy project delivery within the South Australian Government significantly reforming the South Australian energy sector.
- Andrew Robert Macdonald – For outstanding public service in local government providing strategic leadership during the COVID-19 pandemic.
- Caroline Mary Mealor – For outstanding public service in providing strategic leadership and reforms in the Attorney-General's Department.

=== Australian Police Medal (APM) ===
Australian Police Medal ribbon

Federal

- Assistant Commissioner Douglas Ian Boudry
- Sergeant Nikola Skoric

New South Wales

- Chief Inspector Amanda Lee Calder
- Detective Sergeant Kristi Lee Faber
- Matthew David Faber
- Superintendent Kirsty Maree Heyward
- Detective Sergeant Michael Barry Smith
- Superintendent Scott Richard Tanner
- Senior Sergeant Catherine Ann Urquhart
- Detective Superintendent David Anthony Waddell
- Detective Chief Inspector Cameron James Whiteside

Victoria

- Detective Senior Sergeant Anthony John Combridge
- Inspector William Hamilton Duncan
- Superintendent Murray James Fraser
- Commander Mark Graham Galliott
- Detective Senior Sergeant Angela Hantsis
- Detective Superintendent Michael John Sheehan

Queensland

- Senior Sergeant Craig William Berry
- Chief Inspector Michael David Fawcett
- Sergeant Kelly Suzanne Gurski
- Chief Superintendent John Edwin Hallam
- Senior Sergeant Robert William Richards
- Senior Sergeant Rima Seferovic
- Detective Senior Sergeant Peter John Ziser

Western Australia

- Assistant Commissioner Arlene Mavratsou
- Brevet Senior Sergeant Karyn Lee Meyer
- Senior Constable Bevan Keith O'Donnell
- Superintendent Craig Leslie Parkin

South Australia

- Chief Superintendent Scott Antony Allison
- Senior Sergeant Heidi Maria Baldwin
- Senior Sergeant First Class Richard James Errington

Tasmania

- Detective Inspector George John Cretu

Northern Territory

- Deputy Commissioner Martin John Dole

=== Australian Fire Service Medal (AFSM) ===
Australian Fire Service Medal ribbon

New South Wales

- Lorraine Bruce
- Paul James Dorin
- Paul Robert Johnstone
- Peter Wiley Johnstone
- Clifford John Last
- Walter Joseph Murray
- Charles Otmar Schusser
- Richard Thomas Scilley
- Fiona Stalgis
- Assistant Commissioner Cheryl Anne Steer
- Suzanne Beryl Talbert

Western Australia

- Dr Gregory John Henry
- David Leonard Holland
- Darren Peter Martin

South Australia

- James Ernest Keatch
- Phillip John McDonough

Australian Capital Territory

- Michael John Blaseotto
- Colin John O'Rourke

Northern Territory

- Garry Russell Branson
- Geoffrey Bryan Kenna

=== Ambulance Service Medal (ASM) ===
Ambulance Service Medal ribbon

Queensland

- Christopher Robert Haswell
- Rachel Veronica Latimer

Western Australia

- Brian David Gallop
- Philip Mark Stanaitis

South Australia

- Anthony Cuzzocrea
- Naomi Suzanne Stidiford

Tasmania

- Laura Georgina Butler
- Jordan David Emery

Australian Capital Territory

- Joanne Louise Miles

=== Emergency Services Medal (ESM) ===
Emergency Services Medal ribbon

- Keith William Lewis
- Ian Leslie Baker
- Andrew Edmunds
- David William Ellis
- Terrie-Ann Hurt
- Roman Jerzy Mazurek
- Rodney John McDonagh
- Colin James Tritton
- Anthony Mills Whybrow, RFD
- Dr Sara Lesley Pulford
- Grant Bruce Bedwell
- Jim Kokkalos
- David McKenzie
- Joseph Robert Watt
- Georgie Wettenhall
- Glenn Michael Hall

=== Australian Corrections Medal (ACM) ===
Australian Corrections Medal ribbon

- Peta Lewese Blood
- Melissa Brien
- Assistant Commissioner John Matthew Buckley
- Daniel Richard Colson
- Kylie Garrett
- Leanne Maree Green
- Mathew Stephen James
- Louise Lane
- Kristy Murphy
- Gwenyth Anne Owen
- John Rosset
- Vivian Joan Scott
- Nicholas Paul Selisky
- Selina Shea
- Murray Andrew Stewart
- James Edward Taylor-Dayus
- Paul Shane Verbeek

=== Australian Intelligence Medal (AIM) ===
Australian Intelligence Medal ribbon

- Avril Danica Haines

== Distinguished and Conspicuous Service ==
=== Conspicuous Service Cross (CSC) ===
Conspicuous Service Cross ribbon

Navy

- Captain Sean Archibald Andrews, RAN – For outstanding achievement as the Commander Headquarters Middle East on Operation ACCORDION from September 2022 to June 2023.
- Captain Jody Louise Bastian, RAN – For outstanding devotion to duty in managing the Defence response to cases of historical abuse as Director of the Defence Response Unit. in the Australian Defence Force Headquarters.
- Captain Benjamin Robert Favelle, RAN – For outstanding devotion to duty as Captain Defence Marine Support Services Group.
- Lieutenant Thomas Ralph Icke, RAN – For outstanding achievement as the Royal Australian Navy Submarine Liaison officer to the United States Navy Commander, Submarine Group SEVEN in support of Operation SAVILLE from July 2021 to July 2023.
- Captain Glen Andrew Miles, RAN – For outstanding achievement as the Director Nuclear Powered Submarine Capability – Operational Evaluation.
- Commander Michael Pounder, RAN – For outstanding devotion to duty in support of the Pacific Maritime Security Program.
- Captain Christopher John Smith, RAN – For outstanding achievement as Defence Attaché, Seoul in advancing Australia's defence relationship with the Republic of Korea.
- Chief Petty Officer Belinda Anne Wyard – For outstanding devotion to duty in the fields of Safety and Life Saving Equipment for the Royal Australian Navy.

Army

- Lieutenant Colonel S – For outstanding achievement as Staff Officer Grade One Special Operations Collective Training.
- Colonel L – For outstanding achievement in the field of Special Forces training and education as Commanding Officer of the Australian Defence Force School of Special Operations.
- Major Geoffrey Edward Brennan – For outstanding achievement in technical Joint Force communications integration within the Australian Defence Force.
- Lieutenant Colonel Joel Patrick Domigan – For outstanding achievement as the Commanding Officer of the 1st Aviation Regiment.
- Lieutenant Colonel Christopher Gilmore – For outstanding achievement as Commanding Officer of the 5th Battalion, the Royal Australian Regiment.
- Lieutenant Colonel Owain Stuart Griffiths – For outstanding devotion to duty as the Brigade Major of the 6th Brigade.
- Lieutenant Colonel Benjamin John Howard – For outstanding achievement in the development of Infantry Fighting Vehicle capabilities in the Australian Army.
- Colonel Scott Jamieson – For outstanding devotion to duty as the Australian Defence Advisor Central Pacific.
- Lieutenant Colonel Dayton Saul McCarthy – For outstanding achievement as the Commanding Officer of 9th Battalion, Royal Queensland Regiment and Commanding Officer of the 2nd Division's Reinforcing Battle Group.
- Colonel Richard Anthony Niessl – For outstanding devotion to duty as the Commanding Officer of the 6th Battalion, the Royal Australian Regiment.
- Lieutenant Colonel Leigh Thomas Partridge – For outstanding achievement as the Commanding Officer of 16th Battalion, the Royal Western Australia Regiment.
- Brigadier Nicholas Wilson – For outstanding achievement as the Director Strategic and Sensitive Issues Management – Army.

Air Force

- Flight Lieutenant Jack Edward Devine – For outstanding achievement as Staff Officer Grade 3 Integration, Innovation and Cyber at Headquarters Number 41 Wing.
- Flight Sergeant Ludovico Jon Lico – For outstanding achievement in training and capability development for the KC-30A Multi Role Tanker Transport Aircraft capability for the Royal Australian Air Force.
- Group Captain Craig William Nielsen – For outstanding achievement as the Commanding Officer of the Royal Australian Air Force Security and Fire School.
- Air Commodore Jarrod Lee Pendlebury – For outstanding achievement as Military Adviser to the Permanent Mission of Australia to the United Nations.
- Squadron Leader Brent Jarrett Purcell – For outstanding achievement as Staff Officer Grade 2 – Facilities, Special Operations Command.
- Flight Lieutenant Scott James Taylor – For outstanding achievement in runway remediation works at Royal Australia Air Force Base Tindal and Royal Malaysian Air Force Base Butterworth for the Royal Australian Air Force.

=== Conspicuous Service Medal (CSM) ===
Conspicuous Service Medal ribbon

Navy

- Lieutenant Commander Timothy Luke Craig, RAN – For meritorious achievement as the Training Officer of 723 Squadron – Joint Helicopter School.
- Petty Officer Stephen Raymond Dunlop – For devotion to duty as a Weapon Systems Maintainer in the Royal Australian Navy.
- Lieutenant Commander Alexander James Finnis, RAN – For meritorious achievement as the Commanding Officer of HMAS Glenelg on Operations RESOLUTE, SOLANIA and SAVILLE, from December 2020 to October 2022.
- Captain Belinda Gai Greenwood, RAN – For meritorious achievement as the Director of the Defence People System Implementation.
- Captain David Adam Hannah, RAN – For devotion to duty as the Director Domestic and Regional Commitments and Director Global United Nations and Counter Terrorism.
- Lieutenant David Alan-James Loynd, RAN – For meritorious achievement as the Joint Intelligence Officer to Headquarters Middle East on Operation ACCORDION from 10 December 2022 to 17 July 2023.
- Commander Lauren Leigh Milburn, RAN – For meritorious achievement as the Royal Australian Navy Women's Strategic Advisor.
- Petty Officer Jim William Schacht – For meritorious achievement as the Hull Supervisor at Fleet Support Unit South East.
- Lieutenant Commander William Angus Stow, RAN – For meritorious achievement in the field of Naval Aviation training and operations.

Army

- Warrant Officer Class Two C – For meritorious achievement as an Electronic Warfare Manager and Intelligence Oversight Officer in Special Operations Command from 2016 to 2023.
- Warrant Officer Class Two B – For meritorious achievement in enhancing medical training in Special Operations Command from 2021 to 2023.
- Warrant Officer Class Two T – For meritorious achievement as a Special Operations Engineer in the Special Air Service Regiment, Special Operations Command.
- Corporal T – For meritorious achievement as a Team Leader within Special Operations Command.
- Lieutenant Colonel Brian Francis Bearman – For meritorious achievement as a career manager at the Directorate of Officer Career Management – Army.
- Major Timothy Peter Bowers – For meritorious achievements as the Information Manager of the 1st (Australian) Division.
- Warrant Officer Class Two Anthony Shane Campbell – For meritorious achievement as a Squadron Sergeant Major in the 2nd Cavalry Regiment.
- Major Justin Thomas Cross – For meritorious achievement as a Project Engineer delivering key infrastructure in support of Indo-Pacific Enhance Regional Engagement.
- Warrant Officer Class Two Julian James Evans – For meritorious achievement as the acting 16th Aviation Brigade Communications Officer and Brigade Communications Manager.
- Lieutenant Colonel Steven John Frankel, CSC – For meritorious achievement commanding the Australian Defence Force element supporting the stabilisation mission in the Solomon Islands from November 2021 to March 2022.
- Warrant Officer Class Two Peter Anthony Hopkins – For devotion to duty to the Western Australian Defence region as a Warrant Officer from 2003 to 2023.
- Corporal Dylan Gary Neumann – For meritorious achievement as the Information, Communication and Technology Administrator within the Weapons Technical Intelligence Platoon, 1st Intelligence Battalion.
- Lieutenant Colonel Geoffrey David Price – For meritorious achievement in the provision of movements support for Australian Defence Force and whole-of-government operations.
- Major Gregory Thomas Sargeant – For meritorious achievement as the initial Commander of Rotation 1 of Operation KUDU over the period January to April 2023.
- Warrant Officer Class Two Brenda Joy Smith – For meritorious achievement as the Unit Welfare Officer of the 10th Force Support Battalion.
- Sergeant Leighton Barnet Wilson – For meritorious achievement as acting Artificer Sergeant Major of the 7th Signal Regiment.

Air Force

- Corporal J – For meritorious achievement in support of the Australian Signals Directorate.
- Squadron Leader Michael Paul Berry – For meritorious achievement in airworthiness and aviation safety for Remotely Piloted Aircraft Systems in the Royal Australian Air Force.
- Corporal Andrew James Fowler – For meritorious achievement in training development and regulatory compliance for the technical workforce on the E-7A Wedgetail capability at Number 2 Squadron.
- Squadron Leader Darrin John Lindsay – For meritorious achievement in security governance management and reform in Airborne Early Warning and Control, and Electronic Warfare capabilities for the Australian Defence Force.
- Squadron Leader Lindy Yvette Perrett – For meritorious achievement in the management of C-27J Spartan flying operations and future planning for the Royal Australian Air Force.
- Squadron Leader Rebecca Trembath – For meritorious achievement as the Chief Instructor at the Royal Australian Air Force Security and Fire School.
