= Kate Smith-Miles =

Australian applied mathematician

Kate Amanda Smith-Miles AO FAA is an Australian applied mathematician, known for her research on neural networks and combinatorial optimization. She is a Melbourne Laureate Professor of applied mathematics at the University of Melbourne, and a former president of the Australian Mathematical Society.

== Education and career ==
Smith-Miles earned a bachelor's degree in mathematics at the University of Melbourne. There, she did honours research on chaos theory under the mentorship of Colin J. Thompson, and initially planned to continue in graduate study in mathematics, but instead earned her Ph.D. in electrical engineering at Melbourne, working with Marimuthu Palaniswami and with Mohan Krishnamoorthy at CSIRO.

She worked as a professor of information technology in the School of Business Systems at Monash University from 1996 to 2006, as a professor of information technology and head of the school of engineering at Deakin University from 2006 to 2009, and as a professor of applied mathematics at Monash University from 2009 to 2017 and head of the school of mathematical sciences at Monash from 2009 to 2014. In 2017 she took her present position at Melbourne.

== Recognition ==
Smith-Miles is a Fellow of the Institute of Engineers Australia (elected 2006), and of the Australian Mathematical Society (elected 2008). She is the 2010 winner of the Australian Mathematical Society Medal and the 2017 winner of the E. O. Tuck Medal of ANZIAM (Australia and New Zealand Industrial and Applied Mathematics). In 2014 the Australian Research Council awarded the Georgina Sweet Australian Laureate Fellowship to her. She was elected a Fellow of the Australian Academy of Science in 2022.

Smith-Miles was appointed an Officer of the Order of Australia in the 2024 King's Birthday Honours for "distinguished service to tertiary education, to applied mathematical research, and as a role model and advocate for women in STEM". She was elected a Fellow of the Australian Academy of Technological Sciences & Engineering in 2026.
