= Clapham (disambiguation) =

Clapham may refer to:

== Places in Australia ==
- Clapham, South Australia, a suburb in Adelaide

== Places in England ==
- Clapham, a district in the London Borough of Lambeth
  - near to Clapham Junction railway station
  - Clapham Common
  - Clapham Park
  - Clapham Sect
  - the former Clapham UK parliamentary constituency
  - the former Clapham (London County Council constituency)
  - gave a name to the Man on the Clapham omnibus, a hypothetical reasonable person in English law
- Clapham, Bedfordshire, a village
- Clapham, North Yorkshire, a village
  - near to Clapham railway station
- Clapham, West Sussex, a village
- Clapham, Devon, a village in the parish of Kenn, Devon

== People ==
- Clapham (surname)
