= Natural prolongation principle =

The natural prolongation principle or principle of natural prolongation is a legal concept introduced in maritime claims submitted to the United Nations.

The phrase denotes a concept of political geography and international law that a nation's maritime boundary should reflect the 'natural prolongation' of where its land territory reaches the coast.

Oceanographic descriptions of the land mass under coastal waters became conflated and confused with criteria that are deemed relevant in border delimitation. The concept was developed in the process of settling disputes if the borders of adjacent nations were located on a contiguous continental shelf.

An unresolved issue is whether a natural prolongation defined scientifically, without reference to equitable principles, is to be construed as a "natural prolongation" for the purpose of maritime border delimitation or maritime boundary disputes.

== History ==
The phrase natural prolongation was established as a concept in the North Sea Continental Cases in 1969.

The relevance and importance of natural prolongation as a factor in delimitation disputes and agreements has declined during the period in which international acceptance of UNCLOS III has expanded.

The Malta/Libya Case in 1985 is marked as the eventual demise of the natural prolongation principle being used in delimiting between adjoining national maritime boundaries.

The Bay of Bengal cases in the early 2010s (Bangladesh v Myanmar) and (Bangladesh v India) likewise dealt a blow to natural prolongation as the guiding principle for delimitation of the continental shelf more than 200 nautical miles beyond baselines.

== See also ==
- Equidistance principle

== Sources ==
- Capaldo, Giuliana Ziccardi. (1995). Répertoire de la jurisprudence de la cour internationale de justice (1947-1992). Dordrecht: Martinus Nijhoff Publishers. ISBN 9780792329930; ISBN 9780792335146; ISBN 9780792335153; OCLC 30701545
- Dorinda G. Dallmeyer and Louis De Vorsey. (1989). Rights to Oceanic Resources: Deciding and Drawing Maritime Boundaries. Dordrecht: Martinus Nijhoff Publishers. ISBN 9780792300199; OCLC 18981568
- Francalanci, Giampiero; Tullio Scovazzi; and Daniela Romanò. (1994). Lines in the Sea. Dordrecht: Martinus Nijhoff Publishers. ISBN 978-0-7923-2846-9; OCLC 30400059
- Kaye, Stuart B. (1995). Australia's maritime boundaries. Wollongong, New South Wales: Centre for Maritime Policy (University of Wollongong). ISBN 9780864183927; OCLC 38390208
