= Vivian Lin =

Professor of public health at the University of Hong Kong

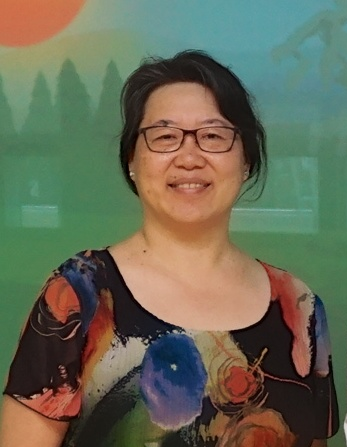
- Lin in 2014
- Education: University of California, Berkeley
- Scientific career
- Workplaces: University of Hong Kong; Li Ka Shing Faculty of Medicine
- Thesis: Health, women's work, and industrialization : semiconductor workers in Singapore and Malaysia (1986)

Vivian Kwang-wen Lin is Honorary Professor in the Li Ka Shing Faculty of Medicine at the University of Hong Kong. She was the Executive Associate Dean of the same faculty from 2019 until 2024.

== Early life and education ==
Lin earned her bachelor's degree at Yale University in 1977. She moved to the University of California, Berkeley for her graduate studies, first earning a master's degree in public health (1979) and subsequently a doctorate (1986).

== Research and career ==
Lin moved to Australia in 1982, joining the Victorian Health Department. In 1997 she was appointed Executive Officer of the National Public Health Partnership. The NPHP looked to develop a strategic response to public health challenges in Australia. It covered topics including Aboriginal health, communicable diseases, mental health and healthy ageing.

In 2000 Lin was appointed Chair of Public Health at La Trobe University in Melbourne. There she worked on Australian public health policy. She moved to the World Health Organization in 2013, where she was made Director of Health Systems in the Western Pacific Regional Office. At the WHO Lin worked on programmes including universal health coverage, gender-based violence, health law and community engagement. Working with the Australian government, Lin created an Australian health sector aid strategy for China.

In 2019 Lin joined the Li Ka Shing Faculty of Medicine at the University of Hong Kong. During the COVID-19 pandemic, Lin was appointed to the Paris Institute for Advanced Study World Pandemic Research Network (WPRN). The WPRN looked to understand the impact of coronavirus disease on the social sciences and humanities.

Lin serves on the editorial board of the Journal of Hospital Management & Health Policy.

== Selected publications ==
- Xue, Charlie C.L.; Zhang, Anthony L.; Lin, Vivian; Da Costa, Cliff; Story, David F. (2007-08-01). "Complementary and Alternative Medicine Use in Australia: A National Population-Based Survey". The Journal of Alternative and Complementary Medicine. 13 (6): 643–650. doi:10.1089/acm.2006.6355. ISSN 1075-5535. PMID 17718647.
- Choi, Bernard C. K.; Pang, Tikki; Lin, Vivian; Puska, Pekka; Sherman, Gregory; Goddard, Michael; Ackland, Michael J.; Sainsbury, Peter; Stachenko, Sylvie; Morrison, Howard; Clottey, Clarence (2005-08-01). "Can scientists and policy makers work together?". Journal of Epidemiology & Community Health. 59 (8): 632–637. doi:10.1136/jech.2004.031765. ISSN 0143-005X. PMC 1733111. PMID 16020638.

=== Books ===
- Evidence-based health policy : problems & possibilities. Lin, Vivian., Gibson, Brendan. South Melbourne, Vic.: Oxford University Press. 2003. ISBN 978-0-19-551551-0. OCLC 53286231.
- Lin, Vivian (January 2014). Public health practice in Australia : the organised effort. Smith, James, 1954-, Fawkes, Sally,, Robinson, Priscilla,, Gifford, Sandra M. (Second ed.). Crows Nest, NSW. ISBN 978-1-74331-431-9. OCLC 862728071.
- Eagar, Kathy (2001). Health planning : Australian perspectives. Garrett, Pamela., Lin, Vivian. Crows Nest, N.S.W.: Allen & Unwin. ISBN 978-1-86448-980-4. OCLC 48215263.
