= Louise Fleming (scientist) =

Consultant respiratory paediatrician

Louise Jane Fleming
- Education: National Heart and Lung Institute; Imperial College London; University of Manchester
- Scientific career
- Workplaces: National Heart and Lung Institute; Imperial College London
- Thesis: The use of non-invasive markers of inflammation to guide therapy in children with severe asthma (2010)

Louise Fleming is a British paediatrician who is Professor of Practice in Paediatric Respiratory Medicine at Imperial College London. Her research looks to improve the lives of children with asthma through applied clinical research and innovation. She is a member of the Science Committee of the Global Initiative for Asthma.

== Early life and education ==
Louise Fleming became interested in science as a child. She spent a year and a half volunteering at a hospital physiotherapy department, where she realised that working with patients was something she wanted to do as a career. Fleming went to medical school at the University of Manchester. She specialised in respiratory paediatrics. She moved to The Gambia as a Royal College of Paediatrics and Child Health – Voluntary Service Overseas fellowship. In the Gambia she studied the process of transferring people from local health centres to the main hospital, and designed low cost recommendations to improve the management of children in local health facilities. Fleming returned to the United Kingdom and started a medical doctorate at the National Heart and Lung Institute, where she studied the use of non-invasive markers of inflammation in children with severe asthma. Her research was supported by the British Lung Foundation. After completing her doctorate she finished her specialist training at the Royal Brompton Hospital complemented by an Allergy Fellow post at St Mary's Hospital.

== Research and career ==
Fleming works as a clinician and academic researcher at Imperial College London. Her research focuses on asthma and wheeze, with a focus on new treatment pathways and strategies to harness digital technologies to improve the management of asthma. This includes studying the different types of asthma that children experience, and looking to identify the best treatments for specific types/people. She looks to understand why children do not take their asthma treatments and tries to help them better control their asthma. To do this, Fleming used "Smartinhalers" to measure adherence, and demonstrated that electronic monitoring increase children's adherence to asthma treatment.

Fleming is a member of the Global Initiative for Asthma Scientific Committee. She was promoted to Professor of Practice in 2024.

Professor Fleming is a member of the board of trustees of the Brompton Fountain, a children's charity which supports children with heart and lung conditions at the Royal Brompton and Harefield hospitals.

== Selected publications ==
- Dominick E Shaw; Ana R Sousa; Stephen Fowler; et al. (10 September 2015). "Clinical and inflammatory characteristics of the European U-BIOPRED adult severe asthma cohort". European Respiratory Journal. 46 (5): 1308–1321. doi:10.1183/13993003.00779-2015. ISSN 0903-1936. PMID 26357963. Wikidata Q40552098.
- Helen Reddel; J Mark FitzGerald; Eric D Bateman; et al. (27 June 2019). "GINA 2019: a fundamental change in asthma management: Treatment of asthma with short-acting bronchodilators alone is no longer recommended for adults and adolescents". European Respiratory Journal. 53 (6). doi:10.1183/13993003.01046-2019. ISSN 0903-1936. PMID 31249014. Wikidata Q93087030.
- Elisabeth H. Bel; Ana Sousa; Louise Fleming; et al. (23 November 2010). "Diagnosis and definition of severe refractory asthma: an international consensus statement from the Innovative Medicine Initiative (IMI)" (PDF). Thorax. 66 (10): 910–917. doi:10.1136/thx.2010.153643. ISSN 0040-6376. PMID 21106547. Wikidata Q34151721.
