= Graeme Cowan =

Australian author of four books

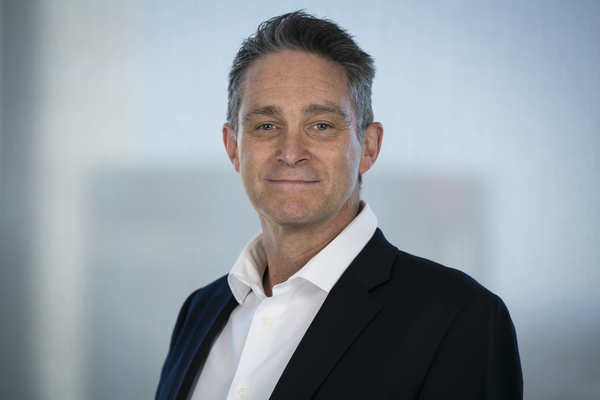
- Occupation: Author
- Writing career
- Language: English
- Genre: Non fiction

Graeme Cowan (born March 10, 1958) is an Australian author of four books. He also helped Gavin Larkin create and launch the charity R U OK?.

== Career ==
His book, Back from the Brink, includes a testimonial from the former UK Prime Minister Tony Blair, a foreword by actress Glenn Close and has been launched in China. It was written from his first-hand knowledge of surviving four suicide attempts and suffering from clinical depression. His book, Back from the Brink Too, won the 2009 SANE Australia Book of the Year Award.

He has also written Elephant in the Boardroom and Thriving Naturally. He is a non executive director for R U OK?, a columnist for PsychCentral and Psychology Today and a motivational speaker.

== Personal life ==
In 2000, Cowan went through a five-year episode of depression, including four suicide attempts, before recovering. On September 10, 2019, World Suicide Prevention Day, Graeme shared his 2004 suicide note on LinkedIn to spark a conversation about depression. The post went viral with over 70,000 views and 250 comments. He is married to Professor Karen Canfell and lives in Sydney.
