= Elizabeth Kendall =

Elizabeth Kendall may refer to:

- Liz Kendall (born 1971), British politician
- Elizabeth Kendall (disability academic), Australian disability researcher
- Elizabeth Kendall (historian) (born 1947), American academic
- Elizabeth Kimball Kendall (1855-1952), American historian and traveler
- Elisabeth Kendall, British Arabist
- Elizabeth Kendall, Utah woman who had a relationship with serial killer Ted Bundy
