= Una M. Ryan =

Irish biochemist

Una M. Ryan AM
- Born: Una M. Ryan; 1966 (age 59–60); Ireland
- Education: University College Dublin; Murdoch University
- Occupations: researcher, academic
- Years active: 1989–
- Employer: Murdoch University
- Known for: epidemiology of infectious agents particularly, Cryptosporidium, Giardia, Neospora and piroplasms

Una M. Ryan AM (born 1966) is a biochemist from Ireland, researching parasites and infectious agents in Australia, where she lives. She is an associate professor at the School of Veterinary and Biomedical Sciences of Murdoch University. In 2000, she received the Frank Fenner Prize for Life Scientist of the Year from the Prime Minister of Australia for her work in isolating a method of diagnosing parasites.

== Biography ==
Una Ryan was born in Ireland in 1966 and completed her undergraduate work in zoology at University College Dublin in 1988. The following year, she moved to Australia and began working at Murdoch University. Ryan continued her studies earning her PhD in 1996 in parasitology, with a specialisation in on protozoan parasites. Her research has analysed the transmission and epidemiology of infectious disease parasites, initially focused on Cryptosporidium, a protozoan parasite which causes diarrhoea and in severe cases can result in death. Cryptosporidium and Giardia are the two most prevalent parasites causing public health risk from water utilities in developed nations, due to contamination of water catchment areas by livestock. Ryan developed a test to verify if the parasites are present in water samples and if they are present, whether they are one of the two types that are harmful to humans. She filed a worldwide patent on her DNA method of diagnosing Cryptosporidium and was awarded a Frank Fenner Prize for Life Scientist of the Year, one of the Minister's Prizes and highest award given by the Prime Minister of Australia to recognise scientists' contributions. She was elected a Fellow of the Australian Society for Parasitology in 2021.

Her work has continued and expanded to include research on Giardia, Neospora and piroplasms and she has received grants from the Australian Research Council as well as other organisations to evaluate parasitic impact on the water supply and public health. In one study, her primary results showed that sheep, though they contribute to water contamination, are not a significant contributor to parasites which affect humans. Ryan is an associate professor at the School of Veterinary and Biomedical Sciences and lecturer in biochemistry at Murdoch University.

Ryan was appointed a Member of the Order of Australia in the 2024 King's Birthday Honours for "significant service to tertiary education, to biochemistry, and to parasitology".

== Selected works ==
- Jefferies, Ryan; Ryan, Una M; Muhlnickel, Carl J; Irwin, Peter J (April 2003). "Two Species of Canine Babesia in Australia: Detection and Characterization by PCR". Journal of Parasitology. 89 (2): 409–412. doi:10.1645/0022-3395(2003)089[0409:tsocbi]2.0.co;2. PMID 12760669. S2CID 6989927.
- Xiao, Lihua; Ryan, Una M (October 2004). "Cryptosporidiosis: an update in molecular epidemiology". Current Opinion in Infectious Diseases. 17 (5): 483–490. doi:10.1097/00001432-200410000-00014. PMID 15353969. S2CID 24433071.
- Ryan, Una M; Power, Michelle; Xiao, Lihua (January–February 2008). "Cryptosporidium fayeri n. sp. (Apicomplexa: Cryptosporidiidae) from the Red Kangaroo (Macropus rufus)". Journal of Eukaryotic Microbiology. 55 (1): 22–26. doi:10.1111/j.1550-7408.2007.00299.x. PMID 18251799. S2CID 21935538.
- Ryan, Una (2010). WaterRa cyptosporidium literature review. Adelaide, Australia: Water Research Australia Limited. ISBN 978-1-78040-621-3.
- Ryan, Una (2014). Cryptosporidium Literature Review. London: IWA Publishing. ISBN 978-1-78040-620-6.
