= Clapham (surname) =

Clapham is a surname. Notable people with the surname include:

- Aaron Clapham (born 1987), New Zealand footballer
- Arthur Roy Clapham (1904–1990), British botanist
- Charlie Clapham (football chairman), chairman of Southport Football Club
- David Clapham (1931–2005), South African racing driver and motor sport journalist
- Jamie Clapham (born 1975), English footballer.
- Sir John Clapham (economic historian) (1873–1946), British economic historian
- John Clapham (historian and poet) (1566–1619), English historian and poet
- John Greaves Clapham (c. 1796 – 1854 or later), Canadian business man and politician
- John Peele Clapham (1801–1875), English magistrate and philanthropist
- Kathleen Clapham, Indigenous Australian anthropologist and health researcher
- Mark Clapham (born 1976), British writer
- Michael Clapham (born 1943), UK politician, Labour Member of Parliament
- Olive Clapham (1898–1973), first woman pass the bar finals examinations in England and Wales
- Victor J. Clapham (South African Scout Association) Scouting notable, awardee of the Bronze Wolf in 1976
- William Clapham (or Clappan) (fl. 1747), Captain in the British Army
