= Betty Taylor (community advocate) =

Australian campaigner against domestic violence

Betty Taylor AM (born Elizabeth Anne Frost, 1949 in Queensland) is an Australian community advocate and domestic violence prevention campaigner.

== Early life and education ==
Taylor graduated in sociology from Monash University in 1997. She began her career as an outreach worker on the Gold Coast, establishing the Gold Coast Domestic Violence Prevention Centre and since then has represented various domestic violence agencies and review boards.

== Career ==
Taylor has achieved considerable success with the implementation of initiatives which aim to end domestic violence in Australia. She is a veteran campaigner against domestic violence with a particular interest in preventing the violent deaths of women, stalking and the objectification of women. Taylor is the founder and currently chief executive officer of the Red Rose Foundation which campaigned for and achieved the establishment of a Domestic Violence Review Board in Queensland and the introduction of a new offence for non-lethal strangulation. This work also resulted in an Australian Institute for Strangulation Prevention which provides training and research into intimate partner strangulation for professionals working with domestic violence and sexual assault.

The Red Rose Foundation holds a public red rose rally following domestic violence deaths. Taylor has also initiated the red bench project, where park benches are installed in locations across Australia as a reminder of domestic violence within our community, each bearing a plaque that reads:"Domestic Violence - Let's change the ending".

Her role as an anti-domestic violence campaigner sees her frequently comment on stories in the media relating to the issue of domestic violence in Australia.

As chairperson of the Ministerial Domestic and Family Violence Council, Taylor established the Domestic and Family Violence Prevention Week initiative which was eventually extended to an annual month-long campaign.

In 1995, Taylor chaired the Domestic Violence Council - an advisory body to the Department of Family and Community Services. In October of that year she travelled with Torres Strait islander woman Kailang Dorante to remote areas in Cape York and Torres Strait to consult with indigenous women on domestic violence in their communities.

In 2002, Taylor was awarded a Churchill Fellowship to investigate multi-agency interventions to domestic violence in the United States and Canada. In 2004, Taylor conducted a study tour of the United States and Canada where she researched domestic violence death review boards. Later she played a part in setting up the Domestic Violence Death Review Action Group in Queensland and the Domestic Violence Death Review Board.

In 2017, Taylor was appointed as an independent mediator to lead a reconciliation process for women who were wrongfully sent to the Wolston Park Asylum as "delinquent girls" and the Queensland Government. Following the publication of a report written by Taylor entitled Child Placements by Queensland Government in Adult Mental Health Facilities, which was tabled in state parliament, the women were financially compensated by the Queensland Government.

Taylor was appointed a Member of the Order of Australia in the 2024 King's Birthday Honours for "significant service to the community through domestic violence initiatives and organisations".

== Positions held ==
- Gold Coast Domestic Violence Prevention Centre, founder
- Gold Coast Domestic Violence Integrated Response, oversaw the development
- Queensland Domestic and Family Violence Council, chair for two terms.
- Gold Coast Centre Against Sexual Violence, board member
- Queensland Death Review Board, board member
- Child Death Review Board, board member
- TAVAN Institute (2008), owner and founding director
- Child Death Review Panel, member
- Literature and Evidence Review, consultant
- Women's Legal Service, Brisbane, board member
- Red Rose Foundation, CEO and founder

== Awards ==
In 2001, Taylor received the Centenary Medal for her significant contribution to domestic violence provision.

In 2002, Taylor was awarded a Churchill Fellowship.

On Queensland Day in 2020, Taylor was named as a Queensland Great.

== Publications ==
Becoming free from domestic violence, Taylor, Betty, was published in 1995 in Home Therapist: A Practical, Self Help Guide for Everyday Psychological Problems, p.367-370
Dying To Be Heard, discussion paper on domestic violence and death, 2008
Dying to Be Heard, media kit, 2009
Literature and Evidence Review of Women's Services in Queensland (info required)
Domestic violence and the workplace : training manual / developed for the Office of Status of Women
The Duluth Model, what it is and is not: Clarifying and correcting common misconceptions
