= Peter Blunden =

Australian journalist and newspaper editor

Peter Blunden AM is as of 2012 the former Managing Director of The Herald and Weekly Times, publisher of News Limited titles in Victoria, Australia; the Herald Sun, Sunday Herald Sun, The Weekly Times and mX.

A journalist, he was appointed to this role in 2001, after serving as the editor of the Herald Sun. The man to whom he reported, John Hartigan, said about him "He's a person who certainly expresses energy in everything he does". He was a board member of the Alannah and Madeline Foundation until November 2020 and is a board member of the Royal Children's Hospital Foundation.

Blunden was appointed a Member of the Order of Australia in the 2024 King's Birthday Honours for "significant service to journalism, particularly through print media, and to the community".

In 2024, Blunden was appointed as the chairman of South Pacific Post Limited, publisher of Papua New Guinea Post-Courier.
