= George Hill (chef) =

Australian chef, educator, and author (born 1942)

George Everard Hill AM
- Born: 20 May 1942 (age 83); Bangalore, India
- Occupation: Chef
- Years active: 1957–present
- Known for: Culinary arts and education
- Website: auschef.com

George Everard Hill AM (born 20 May 1942) is an Australian chef, educator, and author. Hill is one of seven living Black Hat Chefs in Australia and is a "2004 Pioneer" amongst Les Toques Blanches (lit. "The White Hats") Executive Chefs of Australia.

== Career ==
George Hill's professional career has borne a range of industrial titles, including these: chef de partie, chef de cuisine, executive chef, cookery teacher, commercial cookery educational manager, hospitality consultant, and business owner-operator.

Hill started his cookery career in 1956 as an apprentice cook in the Cumberland Hotel London. In 1966, he immigrated to Australia and became an Australian citizen in 1979. His first job in Australia was as a chef at the Royal Automobile Club of Victoria (RACV) Club in Melbourne. Following that, he was employed by the William Angliss Institute of TAFE in Melbourne as a commercial cookery teacher in 1971, where he eventually lead a teaching staff numbering more than thirty personnel in the foods department. Subsequently, Hill was promoted to one of the four program managers of the college.

In 1983, he received the Australian Foodservice Manufacturers Association Award, which is conferred to those "seen to have done the most for the Foodservice industry". 1994 saw Hill's induction into the National Association of Foodservice Equipment Suppliers Hall of Fame, where he was "acknowledged for contribution as an educator" within the hospitality industry. In 1986, Hill moved to the new Chisholm Institute in Victoria to head the Tourism and Hospitality Faculty.

Hill was the owner-operator of Rosehill Lodge, an externally rated five-star bed and breakfast for "foodies" which was twice acknowledged as a finalist in the 1999 and 2000 Victorian Tourism Awards.

Hill was awarded a Churchill Fellowship in 1988, and has coauthored the only technical book on the topic of margarine and butter sculpture. He was also Director of the World Championships in Commercial Cookery in Melbourne and represented Australia in the 1980 Culinary Olympics winning gold for Australia. He was appointed to represent Australia as a cookery judge in the first Worldskills 1983 and has internationally judged in New Zealand and Fiji.

In 2000, Hill was bestowed the Sidney Taylor Memorial Black Hat Award. The award's selection panel's guidelines describe the title of Black Hat Chef as the following:

The honour is considered by professional chefs in Australia to be the highest industry achievement possible. The award acknowledges the holder of a Black Hat's pursuit of excellence, contribution to industry, professional standards, industry standing and commitments, which must be measurably and significantly beyond that, would be expected in a normal career of a commercial chef. The award is conferred following: an industry nomination, investigation and a secret ballot requiring unanimous support of a convened selection committee and must finally have complete endorsement by all member chefs.

Hill has worked for the education and training of chefs, creating the Australian chefs' portal web site, SalonCulinaire.com, AusChef.com, Chefpedia.org, and initiating the Australian Culinary Code of Practices for Australian Commercial chefs. These codes have been adopted by every professional chefs association in Australia.

When George Hill created salonculinaire.com two years ago it soon became popular as a tool assisting with the preservation of culinary standards and encouraging debate on culinary issues between the 450 registered chefs. Many projects have been achieved, but the most significant was the creation of the Australian Culinary Codes of Practice.”

— James Mussak, Executive Chef, author, past founding president NSW Chefs Association

Hill was appointed a Member of the Order of Australia in the 2024 King's Birthday Honours for "significant service to the culinary industry as a chef and educator, and to the community".

== Acknowledgements ==
Title	Issuer	Year	Source
Chairman of Jury	"Australian Chef of the Year", Foodservice Australia	2010–2012	
National Award for Excellence	Foodservice Suppliers Association of Australia	2010	
Life Member	Australian Culinary Federation	2005	
Pioneer	Les Toques Blanches, The Executive Chef Association of Australia	2004	
Black Hat	Australian Culinary Federation Victoria	2001	
Australian Hall of Fame	National Association of Food Equipment Suppliers	Inducted in 1994	
For Contribution to the Hospitality Industry	Australia Food Service Manufacturers Association	1983	
Gold Medalist	National Team Member, Culinary Olympics in Frankfurt, Germany	1980	

== Bibliography ==
- (2014) Am I Chef?: Back to Basics with the "SAKE" Philosophy
