= Anne Kavanagh =

Australian epidemiologist and researcher

Anne Kavanagh OAM FASSA FAHMS
- Education: Flinders University, Australian National University
- Occupations: Epidemiologist and medical researcher
- Employer: University of Melbourne
- Known for: Disability medicine
- Title: Professor
- Board member of: National Disability Research Partnership, 2024

Anne Kavanagh is an Australian epidemiologist and professor at the University of Melbourne. Her research specialises in inequalities in health across different types of social determinants including gender, disability, the built environment, socioeconomic situations, as well as other factors such as housing and employment.

== Education and career ==
Kavanagh graduated from Flinders University with an MBBS, and then subsequently obtained a PhD from ANU in 1995.

She is a professor of Disability and Health at the University of Melbourne, at the school of population and global health.

Kavanagh's passion for her career and medical research is led by her personal journey, with a child with autism, as well as intellectual disability. She was also later diagnosed with multiple sclerosis.

When my eldest child was diagnosed with Autism and an intellectual disability, I learned first-hand how people with disabilities and their families experienced poorer health outcomes because they were often marginalised from society.

Kavanagh also regularly works in science communications, and publishes her research in The Conversation, including work around the National Disability Insurance Scheme (NDIS) and impacts of funding cuts to the NDIS on families, particularly those from low socioeconomic backgrounds. She has also published work on impacts of Covid lockdowns and vaccinations on the general population.

== Publications ==
Kavanagh has authored a suite of journal articles, over 300 as at June 2024, and has an H index of 62. She was on the editorial board of Disability & Society in 2021. She was also the associate editor of the journal Social Science & Medicine for the years 2008 to 2014.

Select publications include:

- G Turrell, AM Kavanagh (2006) Socio-economic pathways to diet: modelling the association between socio-economic position and food purchasing behaviour. Public health nutrition 9 (3), 375–383.
- AM Kavanagh, DH Broom (1998) Embodied risk: my body, myself?. Social science & medicine 46 (3), 437-444
- AM Kavanagh, JL Goller, T King, D Jolley, D Crawford, G Turrell (2005) Urban area disadvantage and physical activity: a multilevel study in Melbourne, Australia. Journal of Epidemiology & Community Health 59 (11), 934–940.

== Awards and recognition ==
- 2024 – Medal of the Order of Australia (OAM), King's Birthday Honours
- 2022 – Fellow of the Australian Academy of Health and Medical Sciences (FAHMS)
- 2020 – Dame Kate Campbell Fellowship, University of Melbourne.
- 2019 – Convocation Medal Alumni Award, Flinders University.
- 2018 – Fellow of the Academy of the Social Sciences in Australia (FASSA)
- 2018 – Leadership Award, University of Melbourne.
- 2015 – Equity, Diversity and Staff Development Award, University of Melbourne.
- 2007 – Knowledge Transfer Award, School of Population and Global Health, University of Melbourne.
- 2006 – DHS Victoria Public Health Award for Research Innovation.
- 2002 – Young Tall Poppy Award.
