= Christine Rodda =

Australian paediatric endocrinologist and academic (born 1955)

Christine Philippa Rodda AM (born 27 March 1955) is an Australian paediatric endocrinologist and academic. She is an Associate Professor of Paediatrics at the Melbourne Medical School – Western Campus, Sunshine Hospital. Rodda is known for her research on metabolic bone disease and vitamin D deficiency in children.

== Early life and education ==
Christine Rodda was born in Adelaide, South Australia. She completed her Bachelor of Medicine, Bachelor of Surgery (MBBS) at the University of Melbourne in 1978. She became a Fellow of the Royal Australasian College of Physicians (FRACP) in 1987 and earned her Doctor of Philosophy (PhD) from the University of Melbourne in 1990.

== Career ==
Rodda began her medical career as a paediatric registrar at the Royal Children's Hospital in Melbourne in 1984. From 1986 to 1987, she served as a clinical assistant in endocrinology at the same institution.

In 1999, she was appointed Head of Paediatric Endocrinology and Diabetes at Monash Medical Centre, a position she held until 2012. During her tenure, she contributed significantly to the development of paediatric endocrine services including the establishment of a multidisciplinary Young Adult Diabetes Service at Monash Medical Centre.

Since 2012, Rodda has been an associate professor at the Melbourne Medical School – Western Campus, Sunshine Hospital. She was instrumental in developing a new paediatric course for Doctor of Medicine (MD) students and establishing multidisciplinary clinics for young adults with diabetes and for paediatric and adolescent endocrinology.

From 2013 to 2021, she served as a paediatric endocrinologist at Western Health.

== Research ==
Rodda's research focuses on genetic disorders of calcium and vitamin D metabolism, metabolic bone disease, and vitamin D deficiency during pregnancy, infancy, and childhood. She has published extensively, with over 100 publications in peer-reviewed journals, including articles in Science and The Lancet.

== Professional leadership ==
Rodda has held several leadership positions in professional organizations. She served as President of the Australasian Paediatric Endocrine Group (APEG) from 1999 to 2001 and as Treasurer from 1995 to 1999.

== Honors and awards ==
In 2023, Rodda was awarded honorary life membership by the Australian and New Zealand Society of Paediatric Endocrinology and Diabetes in recognition of her significant contributions to paediatric endocrinology. She was also recognized in the King's Birthday Honours list in 2024 for her exceptional achievements and service to paediatric endocrinology, to medical research, and to tertiary education.
