= Sharon Goldfeld =

Paediatrician and public health physician

Sharon Goldfeld AM FAHMS is a paediatrician and public health physician, who is Director of the Centre for Community and Child Health at the Royal Children's Hospital, Co-Group Leader of the Policy and Equity Research Group, and Theme Director, Population Health, at the Murdoch Children's Research Institute.

Goldfeld's research and publications cover early childhood development, parenting and social impacts. Her right@home randomised controlled trial, early intervention nurse home visitation project was recognised with the Marles Medal for outstanding impact in research, and as the most robust of its kind across Australia.

Goldfeld was closely involved in the initial development of the Australian Early Development Index (AEDI), which has been adapted and is now used extensively in Australian Schools as the Australian Early Development Census.

Additionally, Goldfeld is Lead Chief Investigator in the nationwide Kids in Communities data linkage study, funded by the Australian Research Council (ARC) to identify the community-level factors that improve children's outcomes in low socio-economic areas and develop an evidence-base for future studies.

== Awards ==
Goldfeld was awarded the inaugural Marles Medal in 2020 by the University of Melbourne. She won the Rue Wright Award for "best community child health research" in 2010 and 2011. The award was presented during the Annual Scientific Meeting of the Royal Australasian College of Physicians.

Goldfeld won the inaugural Aileen Plant Award in 2008 in recognition of her "contribution to Australian public health leadership and research". The award was sponsored by the Public Health Association of Australia, the Australian Epidemiological Association, the Australasian Faculty of Public Health Medicine and the Australian Health Promotion Association.

She was awarded the Exam Medal by the Australasian Faculty of Public Health Medicine in 2007. She won a Creswick Foundation Travelling Fellowship in 2003 and a Harkness International Fellowship in Health Care Policy, for 1999–2000.

Goldfeld was appointed a Member of the Order of Australia in the 2024 King's Birthday Honours for "significant service to paediatric medicine as a clinician and academic, and to public health research". In the same year, she was elected a Fellow of the Australian Academy of Health and Medical Sciences in 2024.

== Highlighted publications ==
- Potential indirect impacts of the COVID‐19 pandemic on children: a narrative review using a community child health lens.
- 'right@home': a randomised controlled trial of sustained nurse home visiting from pregnancy to child age 2 years, versus usual care, to improve parent care, parent responsivity and the home learning environment at 2 years.
- Kids in Communities Study (KiCS) study protocol: a cross-sectional mixed-methods approach to measuring community-level factors influencing early child development in Australia.
- Epidemiology of positive mental health in a national census of children at school entry.
- Jurisdictional, socioeconomic and gender inequalities in child health and development: Analysis of a national census of 5-year-olds in Australia.
