= Stuart Kaye =

Australian professor of law (born 1967)

Stuart Kaye OAM
- Born: 22 June 1967 (age 58); Sydney, Australia
- Education: Newington College; University of Sydney; Dalhousie University
- Occupations: Professor; captain
- Title: Professor; Captain RANR

Stuart Bruce Kaye OAM (born 22 June 1967) is an Australian professor of law and was, until early 2013, Dean of the Law School at the University of Western Australia. He is a Captain in the Royal Australian Navy Reserve and a Fellow of the Royal Geographical Society.

== Education ==
Kaye was educated at Newington College (1980–1985) and holds degrees in arts and law from the University of Sydney, and a doctorate in law from Dalhousie University. He was admitted as a barrister of the supreme courts of New South Wales, Tasmania, and Queensland.

== Legal career ==
Kaye is currently the Director of the Australian National Centre for Ocean Resources and Security (ANCORS) at the University of Wollongong. Kaye was a senior lecturer in law at the University of Tasmania and was Head of the Law School at James Cook University. In 1995 he was appointed one of the two Australian nominees to the International Hydrographic Organisation's Panel of Experts on Maritime Boundary delimitation. In 2000, he was appointed by the Australian Government to the list of Arbitrators under the 1991 Madrid Protocol to the Antarctic Treaty. He was Dean of Law at the University of Wollongong between 2002 and 2006. Kaye was appointed to a Chair in Law at the University of Melbourne in 2006, and from 2011 to 2013 was Dean of the Law School at the University of Western Australia. He is on the Board of Editors of Ocean development and International Law and the Antarctic and southern Ocean Law and Policy Occasional Papers. He is also a member of the advisory Board of the Asia-Pacific Centre for Military law at the University of Melbourne. Kaye was appointed to a Chair in Law at the University of Melbourne in 2006. He is on the Board of Editors of Ocean development and International Law and the Antarctic and southern Ocean Law and Policy Occasional Papers. He is also a member of the advisory Board of the Asia-Pacific Centre for Military law at the University of Melbourne. He was appointed to the International Hydrographic Organization's Panel of Experts on Maritime Boundary Delimitation in 1995 and in 2000 was appointed to the List of Arbitrators under the Environmental Protocol to the Antarctic Treaty. He has been chair of the Australian Red Cross National International Humanitarian Law Committee since 2003. He is a legal officer in the Royal Australian Navy Reserve and a Fellow of the Royal Geographical Society and the Australian Academy of Law.

== Honours and recognition ==
Kaye was awarded the Medal of the Order of Australia in the 2024 King's Birthday Honours for "service to international law, and to tertiary education".

== Qualifications ==
- Doctor in the Science of Law, Dalhousie University, 1999
- Master of Laws, University of Sydney, 1994
- Bachelor of Laws, University of Sydney, 1991
- Bachelor of Arts, University of Sydney, 1989
- Graduate Diploma of Legal Practice, University of Technology, Sydney, 1992

== Selected works ==
Kaye's published writings encompass 17 works in 27 publications in 1 language and 512 library holdings.

- An Examination of Australia's Maritime Boundaries (1994)
- The Torres Strait Treaty: a Decade in Perspective (1994)
- Legal Approaches to Polar Fisheries Regimes: a Ccomparative Analysis of the Convention for the Conservation of Antarctic Marine Living Resources and the Bering Sea Doughnut Hole Convention (1995)
- Australia's Antarctic Maritime Claims and Boundaries (1995)
- The Torres Strait (1997)
- The Laws of the Australian Antarctic Territory (1999)
- International Fisheries Management: a Comparative Analysis of Legal Approaches to Management in the Context of Polar Fisheries Regimes (1999)
- International Fisheries Management (2000)
- Torres Strait Native Title Sea Claim Legal Issues Paper (2004)
- Threats from the Global Commons Problems of Jurisdiction and Enforcement (2007)
- Freedom of Navigation in the Indo-Pacific Region (2008)
