= Katina D'Onise =

Australian public health researcher

Katina D'Onise AM
- Employer: University of Adelaide
- Known for: Prevention and Population Health
- Title: Professor
- Board member of: Non Executive Director

Katina D'Onise AM is an Australian public health researcher, with experience in prevention and population health, communicable diseases, and Indigenous health. She was appointed a Member of the Order of Australia in 2024, on the King's Birthday.

== Selected publications ==
D'Onise has published multiple studies on population health and prevention.

- Andrew P Black; Katina D'Onise; Robyn McDermott; Hassan Vally; Kerin O'Dea (2017). "How effective are family-based and institutional nutrition interventions in improving children's diet and health? A systematic review". BMC Public Health. 17 (1): 818. doi:10.1186/s12889-017-4795-5. PMC 5645887. PMID 29041899. Wikidata Q42682645.
- Katina D'Onise; John W. Lynch; Michael G. Sawyer; Robyn A. McDermott (2010). "Can preschool improve child health outcomes? A systematic review". Social Science & Medicine. 70 (9): 1423–1440. doi:10.1016/j.socscimed.2009.12.037. PMID 20199834. Wikidata Q30978974.
- K D'Onise; R A McDermott; J W Lynch (2010). "Does attendance at preschool affect adult health? A systematic review". Public Health. 124 (9): 500–511. doi:10.1016/j.puhe.2010.05.004. PMID 20716457. Wikidata Q33661252.

== Awards ==
- 2024 - Order of Australia.
