= Jackie Curtis (psychiatrist) =

Jackie Curtis AM
- Born: Jacqueline Eve Curtis
- Employer: University of New South Wales
- Known for: Mental health clinician
- Title: Professor
- Website: https://www.unsw.edu.au/staff/jackie-curtis

Jacqueline E. Curtis AM, best known as Jackie Curtis, is a psychiatrist and mental health clinician, director of the Mindgardens Neuroscience Network, and was appointed a Member of the Order of Australia in 2024 for "service to medicine, particularly as a mental health clinician and researcher". Her research aims to reduce health inequalities among communities and increase life expectancy. She is a professor at the University of New South Wales.

== Education and career ==
Curtis graduated with a Bachelor of Medicine, and Bachelor of Surgery from the University of New South Wales.

Curtis's research bridges the gaps between mental and physical health care. Curtis is the clinical lead and a psychiatric professor at the Youth Mental Health within the South Eastern Sydney Local Area Health District. She is co-founder of iphYs, an international working group which advocates for improved physical health outcomes for young people who experience mental health conditions such as psychosis. Curtis is also a member of the international organisation, the World Health Organisation, for international guidelines on the management of physical health amongst adults and young people with severe mental disorders.

During Curtis's Margaret Tobin oration, on the intersection of mental and physical health, and the colleagues and patients who impacted her journey, she highlighted the following calls to action:

- Each practitioner is responsible for their patient's quality of care, and practitioners need to 'stand with the patients' and put themselves on the 'right side of history'.
- Administrative psychiatry is not separate from the clinicians day job, and it is important to go where your observations take you.
- Public psychiatry is very rewarding, and with disadvantaged patients, together with over-worked colleagues, clinicians have the potential to make a difference.

== Publications ==
Curtis had over 5,900 citations and an H index of 32 as at May 2025. Select publications from Curtis include the following:

- Curtis J; Teasdale SB; Morell R; Wadhwa P; Watkins A; Lederman O; O'Donnell C; et al., (2024), 'The Implementation of a lifestyle intervention to prevent the gain of weight and cardiometabolic abnormalities...: The Keeping the Body in Mind program', Early Intervention in Psychiatry, 18, pp. 731 - 738, doi.org/10.1111/eip.13508.
- Sara G; Gould P; Curtis J; et al. (2023), 'Vaccine-preventable hospitalisations in adult mental health service users', Psych Medicine, 53, pp. 7232 - 7241, doi.org/10.1017/S0033291723000776.
- Curtis J; Teasdale S; Morell R; Wadhwa P; Lederman O; Fibbins H; et al., (2022), 'Implementation of a life-skills and lifestyle intervention to prevent cardiometabolic abnormalities and weight-gain in first-episode psychosis: the Body in Mind program', Euro Psych , 65, pp. S131 - S132, doi.org/10.1192/j.eurpsy.2022.359.
- McKeon G; Curtis J; Rosenbaum S, (2022), 'Promoting physical activity for improving mental health: A review of updated evidence', Curr Opinion in Psych, 35, pp. 270 - 276, doi.org/10.1097/YCO.0000000000000796.

== Awards ==
- 2023 – Margaret Tobin award for administrative psychiatry
- 2024 – Member of the Order of Australia
