= Marimuthu Palaniswami =

Marimuthu Palaniswami from The University of Melbourne, Parkville, Victoria, Australia was named Fellow of the Institute of Electrical and Electronics Engineers (IEEE) in 2012 for contributions to computational intelligence, learning systems, and nonlinear modelling.

Palaniswami received his Ph.D. from the University of Newcastle, Australia.
