= Asha Bowen =

Australian clinician researcher

Asha Bowen is an Australian paediatric infectious diseases clinician-scientist, and public health researcher based in Western Australia. Bowen is an advocate for children's health and well-being. Her work focuses on Aboriginal child health, skin infections, and the prevention of acute rheumatic fever (ARF), alongside translational infectious diseases research and investigator‑initiated clinical trials.

She is a consultant paediatric infectious diseases physician at Perth Children’s Hospital, where she served as Head of the Department of Infectious Diseases from 2020 to 2024. Bowen leads the Healthy Skin and ARF Prevention Team at The Kids Research Institute Australia and previously served as Program Head of the End Rheumatic Heart Disease (END RHD) Program at the Telethon Kids Institute.

She is Western Australia Chair of the Australian Academy of Health and Medical Sciences and Immediate Past President of the World Society for Paediatric Infectious Diseases.

== Education ==
After completing her medical studies at the University of Sydney, Bowen was awarded a Fellowship of the Royal Australasian College of Physicians (FRACP) as a paediatric infectious diseases specialist in 2009. She obtained her PhD at the Menzies School of Health Research in Darwin in 2014 for her thesis titled "The skin sore trial: exploring a better treatment option for impetigo in Indigenous children living in remote Australia". "The skin sore trial". Charles Darwin University. Her doctoral work involved the development and delivery of the first randomized controlled trial of treatment options for impetigo amongst remote living Indigenous Australian children, and, one of the largest impetigo trials in the world.

== Career and research ==
Bowen’s research centres on paediatric infectious diseases, with a particular focus on skin health and ARF prevention in Aboriginal children. Her program spans clinical care, epidemiology, implementation science, and public health, with an emphasis on translation into practice and policy.

Bowen is an expert on Streptococcus pyogenes and Staphylococcus aureus infections which, if left untreated, can lead to life-threatening complications including sepsis, glomerulonephritis and rheumatic fever. She is a lead author of the 2018 "National Healthy Skin Guideline: for the Prevention and Public Health Control of Impetigo, Scabies, Crusted Scabies, and Tinea for Indigenous Populations and Communities in Australia - 1st edition". This guideline is designed to support healthcare professionals, including medical, nursing, allied health and Aboriginal healthcare providers, in the diagnosis, treatment and prevention of these infections. It has been endorsed by The Royal Australasian College of Physicians, Public Health Association Australia, Rheumatic Heart Disease Australia, The Lowitja Institute, Murdoch Children's Research Institute and The Peter Doherty Institute for Infection and Immunity. She has been involved in research that examined the utilization of rapid molecular point-of-care tests to detect and treat Strep A pharyngitis (strep throat) in remote settings to prevent sequalae.

Bowen has been vocal about antimicrobial stewardship and antibiotic resistance issues affecting Indigenous communities residing remote Australia. She has also spoken publicly about shortages in the supply of essential antibiotics, specifically oral trimethoprim-sulfamethoxazole syrup formulations, needed to treat school sores in Aboriginal children.

Throughout the COVID-19 pandemic Bowen has been a leading voice on children's health and well-being. She has advocated for keeping schools open and prioritizing vaccination for teachers and school staff alongside other measures of control such as rapid antigen testing protocols. Bowen has contributed to recommendations on the clinical care of children and adolescents with COVID-19 as part of the Australian National COVID-19 Clinical Evidence Taskforce.

She has led community‑partnered research programs in remote Aboriginal communities in the Kimberley region of Western Australia. Her work integrates clinical services, surveillance, workforce development, and health promotion with environmental health strategies.

Bowen is the lead investigator on the SToP (See Treat and Prevent) skin sores and scabies Trial which aims to strengthen skin health practices in partnership with healthcare workers and community in the Kimberley. Her research seeks to address the gap in infectious skin conditions between Aboriginal children and other Australian children. Bowen says “I would like to see that Aboriginal children in our country are no more likely to have skin infections and the sequelae of those, such as rheumatic fever, rheumatic heart disease or sepsis than any other children. Working in partnership with Aboriginal people and communities to achieve this, and listening for guidance and opportunities to include a strengths based approach is important'.

Bowen is also lead researcher for the "Staph aureus Network Adaptive Platform Paediatrics and Youth" (SNAP-PY) trial which commenced in February 2022 and will involve 7,000 children and adults across more than 100 hospitals in six countries. The trial aims to identify the most effective treatments for Staphylococcus aureus bloodstream infection.

She also led the Missing Piece Surveillance Study (2018–2024), which identified high rates of asymptomatic Group A Streptococcus carriage among Kimberley school children. These findings contributed to changes in ARF prevention strategies and informed guideline development.

Her work has contributed to the development of research methods for remote settings, including specimen transport, diagnostic approaches for skin and throat infections, and point‑of‑care testing for Group A Streptococcus.

Bowen has also participated in international multicentre clinical trials, including as paediatric lead for the SNAP adaptive platform trial investigating Staphylococcus aureus bacteraemia.

In addition to research, she has contributed to national infectious diseases guidelines, including development of the National Healthy Skin Guidelines, and has served on advisory committees in clinical and public health settings, including during the COVID‑19 pandemic. She also leads the Australian Congenital CMV Registry and contributes to public communication of science.

== Academic appointments ==
Bowen is Professor in the Division of Paediatrics, School of Medicine at the University of Western Australia She holds additional honorary and adjunct appointments at:

- Menzies School of Health Research
- The University of Notre Dame Australia
- University of Cape Town
- University of New South Wales
- She has held continuous National Health and Medical Research Council (NHMRC) fellowships since 2010 and currently holds an NHMRC Investigator Award (Leadership 1, 2025–2029).

Her research program has secured substantial competitive funding and includes supervision of medical trainees and higher degree research students.

== Research and public health impact ==
Bowen’s work has focused on improving outcomes for Aboriginal children through community‑led research and its translation into clinical practice and public health policy. Her programs incorporate clinical trials, implementation science, and culturally informed approaches to care.

She has contributed to national and international guideline development and served in advisory roles across hospital and public health sectors. Her work also includes mentoring clinician‑researchers and supporting workforce development in Aboriginal health research.

== Strong Skin ==
Bowen contributed to the development of Strong Skin, a digital health application co‑designed with Aboriginal communities and healthcare providers in Western Australia. The application supports recognition and management of common childhood skin infections and facilitates access to care.

== Selected roles ==
- Western Australia Chair, Australian Academy of Health and Medical Sciences
- Immediate Past President, World Society for Paediatric Infectious Diseases
- Head, Healthy Skin and ARF Prevention Team, The Kids Research Institute Australia
- Professor, Division of Paediatrics, University of Western Australia
- Consultant Paediatric Infectious Diseases Physician, Perth Children’s Hospital

== Awards and honours ==
- 2018 L'Oreal-UNCESCO For Women in Science Australia and New Zealand Fellowship
- 2019 Bayer Australia Medical Research Establishment Fellowship
- 2019 Australian Institute of Policy and Science Tall Poppy Award
- 2020 Eureka Prize Emerging Leader in Science
- 2022 Frank Fenner Award for Advanced Research in Infectious Diseases
- 2024 Medal of the Order of Australia
- 2024 Fellow of the Australian Academy of Health and Medical Sciences
- 2025 WA Premier’s Science Award – Mid‑Career Scientist of the Year
- 2025 UWA Vice‑Chancellor’s Mid‑Career Research Award
- 2026 Eric Susman Prize
