= Vanessa Elliott =

Vanessa Elliott AM
- Known for: Services to the Indigenous community

Vanessa Marie Elliott AM received an Order of Australia, for "significant service to the Indigenous community, to the mining industry, and to public administration" in June 2024. She is a non-executive board member on various First Nations stakeholder boards and has expertise in sustainable land management, with over twenty years experience in managing stakeholders from First Nations communities and the mining community in Western Australia's Kimberley area.

== Early life and career ==
Elliott is from the Kimberley region of Western Australia and also a Jaru woman. She has worked in negotiations for Native Title projects, with facilitating dialogues between various stakeholders around mine expansion projects, as well as communicating amongst mining industry and First Nations infrastructure projects. Elliott was on the 2014 committee for Australian Indigenous Women in Mining.

Elliott has worked in Land Access Agreements, between First Nations communities, as well as Social Impact Assessments. She runs her own consulting company in Perth.

Elliott has worked in community development and indigenous affairs. She joined the Indigenous Board of Australia in 2020. She is also on the board of the Cooperative Research Centre for Transformations in Mining Economics.

She was also appointed to the Northern Australia Infrastructure Facility (NAIF) board, which provides infrastructure and financial assistance to First Nations people. She is an Independent Non-Executive Director, and speaker on topics including 'Developing Better Indigenous Partnerships', and sharing prosperity between First Nations people and industry.

When awarded the Order of Australia, she said,

It's very important as First Nations people that we get to decide who we are and that we should never embody shame. We should never be ashamed, and we should never tell anyone shame job on you that we have a right to be the kind of people that we want to be.

== Awards ==
- 2024 – Member of the Order of Australia.
- 2021 – John Curtin Medal.
- 2011 – 100 Most Influential women in WA.
- 2000 – National NAIDOC Young person of the year.
