= Gillian Hirth =

Health scientist

Gillian Hirth AO
- Education: PhD
- Employer: Australian Radiation Protection and Nuclear Safety Agency
- Known for: Radiation safety

Gillian Anne Hirth AO, also known as Gillian A. Hirth, is a health scientist and CEO of Australian Radiation Protection and Nuclear Safety Agency (ARPANSA). She was appointed an Officer of the Order of Australia for "service to environmental science, nuclear and radiation safety and the development of national and international regulatory standards", and worked with the United Nations following the Fukushima accident, advising on environmental radiology.

== Education and career ==
Hirth graduated in 1999, with a PhD in environmental radiochemistry. She began work at Australian Nuclear Science and Technology Organisation (ANSTO) as a Post-Doctoral Research Fellow from 2000 to 2003. After her position at ANSTO, Hirth worked in the Australian Defence Organisation in the field of hazardous materials and environmental management.

Hirth was previously Chief Radiation Health Scientist of Australian Radiation Protection and Nuclear Safety Agency (ARPANSA), and as at July 2024, is CEO of ARPANSA.

From 2020 to 2023 she was a member of the Commission on Safety Standards of the International Atomic Energy Agency (IAEA). She is also on the Board of Council of the International Union of Radioecology. Hirth was Chair of the United Nations Scientific Committee on the Effects of Atomic Radiation for 2019 to 2020.

Hirth's career has involved developing safety codes and standards, including radionuclide activity concentrations in wildlife in ecosystems around uranium mining.

== Publications ==
Hirth has published on radiation safety, radionuclide activity, and on the radiation levels in wildlife in uranium mining ecosystems.

- Hirth, Gillian. (2014). "A review of existing Australian radionuclide activity concentration data in non-human biota inhabiting uranium environments." Australia.
- Hirth, Gillian A., Mathew P. Johansen, Julia G. Carpenter, Andreas Bollhöfer, Nicholas A. Beresford. (2017). Whole-organism concentration ratios in wildlife inhabiting Australian uranium mining environments, Journal of Environmental Radioactivity, Volumes 178–179, (p. 385–393).
- Hirth, Gillian, Grzechnik, Marcus, & Ainsworth, Anthony (2017). Improving public health relating to ultra-violet radiation exposure – innovations and plans at ARPANSA. ARPS2017 Conference Handbook Science and the Art of Radiation Protection: Broadening the Horizon, (p. 100). Australia.

== Awards ==
- 2024 - King's Birthday - Officer of the Order of Australia.
