= Helen Reddel =

Respiratory physician

- Education: University of Sydney
- Occupation: Respiratory Physician
- Employer: Woolcock Institute of Medical Research
- Known for: Respiratory medicine
- Title: Professor
- Website: https://researchers.mq.edu.au/en/persons/helen-reddel

Helen Reddel or Helen Kathryn Reddel is a respiratory physician, a professor at Macquarie University, and adjunct professor at the University of Sydney, Chair of the Global Initiative for Asthma, who was awarded an Order of Australia in 2024, for services to respiratory medicine.

== Education ==
Reddell was awarded a Bachelor of Science in 1977, and a PhD from the University of Sydney in 2000. She is also a member of the Royal Australasian College of Physicians.

== Career ==
Reddell is a physician working in respiratory health, researching improved methods for treating asthma and respiratory conditions including COPD. Her research focusses on improving the management, treatment and quality of life for people with respiratory conditions, including use of medicines in primary care, as well as monitoring populations and public health.

Reddel has been working on a project, as co-chair, which examines a longitudinal, multinational project which has 15,000 patients, each with either asthma or COPD. The purpose of the study is to determine the disease mechanisms, which underlie the physiology, to enable improved and targeted treatments can be found.

Reddel is chair of the Science Committee for the Global Initiative for Asthma (GINA). She was also chair of the Task Force on Standardized Assessment of Asthma Control, Severity and Exacerbations, from five years from 2004 to 2009. Since 2021, she has also been the Director of the Australian Centre for Airways disease Monitoring.

== Publications ==
Reddel has over 237 publications, with an H-index of 75, and over 23,000 citations as at September 2024, according to Google Scholar. Select publications include the following:

- Davis SR, Ampon RD, Poulos LM, Lee T, Marks GB, Toelle BG, et al. Prevalence and burden of difficult-to-treat and severe asthma in Australia: A national population survey. Respirology. 2024; 29(8): 685–693. doi:10.1111/resp.14722.
- Yorgancıoğlu, A., Reddel, H.K. and (2023), Global initiative for asthma: 30 years of promoting evidence-based asthma care. Allergy, 78: 1737–1739. doi:10.1111/all.15714.
- HK Reddel, ED Bateman, A Becker, LP Boulet, AA Cruz, JM Drazen, et al. (2015). A summary of the new GINA strategy: a roadmap to asthma control. European Respiratory Journal 46 (3), 622–639. doi:10.1183/13993003.00853-2015

== Awards ==
- 2014 – Award for Excellence in e-Health resources, NPS Medicinewise
- 2017 – Research Excellence award, Asthma Australia
- 2019 – Society medal, Thoracic Society of Australia and New Zealand
- 2024 – Member of the Order of Australia in the King's Birthday Honours
- 2025 – Fellow of the Australian Academy of Health and Medical Sciences
