= Jo Douglass =

Australian asthma researcher

Jo A. Douglass
- Education: Monash University
- Occupation: Health researcher
- Employer: Royal Melbourne Hospital
- Known for: Asthma and Allergy research
- Title: Professor
- Website: https://findanexpert.unimelb.edu.au/profile/32737-jo-douglass

Jo A. Douglass or Jo Anne Douglass is an Australian asthma researcher, Director of Research within the Royal Melbourne Hospital, James Stewart Professor of Medicine and she is also Department Head of Medicine within the Melbourne Medical School. She was awarded an Order of Australia, for her "distinguished service to medical research, to clinical immunology and allergy, to respiratory medicine, and to tertiary education."

== Education and career ==
Douglass received her undergraduate degree, in Medical Science, and Bachelor of Medicine and Bachelor of Surgery at Monash University, and subsequently completed postgraduate education in London. She was the president of the Australasian Society of Clinical Immunology and Allergy from 2010 to 2012, as well as a member of the European Respiratory Society.

At the Royal Melbourne Hospital, Douglass was the head of Department of Immunology and Allergy. She specialises in the clinical and research of both asthma and allergic disease, at Royal Melbourne Hospital.

Douglass's research is centered around the clinical and research of asthma and allergies, including thunderstorm asthma, diagnosis using genomic medicine, as well as immune deficiencies.

== Publications ==
Douglass has an H-index of 43, according to Google Scholar, and more than 100 publications as at July 2024. Select examples include:

- Holgate ST, Douglass JA (eds) (2013) Fast Facts: Asthma. Health Press Ltd, Oxford UK. 2013
- Chua JC, Douglass JA, et al. (2012) Galectin-10, a Potential Biomarker of Eosinophilic Airway Inflam. PLoS ONE 7(8): e42549.
- Thompson BR, Douglass JA, et al. (2013) Peripheral Lung Function in patients with ... asthma. Jour of Allergy and Clin Immunology 2013; 131: P1322-1328.
- Chen Y, Stirling R, Hore-Lacy F, Thompson B, Douglass JA. (2011) Longitudinal decline in lung function in patients with primary immunoglobulin deficiencies. J Allergy Clinical Immunolology. 127: P1414-7.
- Douglass, et al. (2012) Over-the-counter β2-agonist purchase vs script: a cross-sectional study. Respiritory Med. 106(2):P 223–9.
- Gillman A, Douglass JA. (2010) What do asthmatics have to fear from food and additive allergy? Clinical Exp Allergy 40: P1295-1302.
- O'Hehir RE, Gardner LM, de Leon MP, Hales BJ, Biondo M, Douglass JA, et al.. (2009) House dust mite immunotherapy: the role for transforming growth factor-beta and ... T cells. Am Journal of Respir Critical Care Med 80: P936-47.

== Awards ==
- 2024 - Order of Australia.
- 2015 – Fellow, Thoracic Society of Australia and New Zealand.
- 2013 – Fellowship, Thoracic Society of Australia and New Zealand.
- 1992 – FRACP – Fellow of the Royal Australasian College of Physicians
