= Thea Brown =

Australian social work educator

- Education: University of Sydney University of Melbourne
- Known for: Domestic violence research
- Title: Emeritus Professor

Thea Brown or Thea Charlotte Brown is an emeritus Professor in filicide and social work education, and was awarded an Order of Australia in June 2024, for "significant service to social welfare, particularly through family violence and child protection research". She has examined which programs and policies lead to reductions in domestic violence. Her research and findings on domestic violence around relationship breakdown resulted in changes in Federal Family Court programs and laws, and in particular, in 2011, her research was instrumental in changes to the Australian Family Law Legislation (Family Violence and Other Measures).

== Early life and education ==
Brown's first position was as a social worker, at the Professorial Units of Medicine and Surgery, within the Royal Prince Alfred Hospital.

Brown received a Bachelor of Arts, in 1962, Diploma of Social work in 1962, and a PhD from the University of Melbourne. Brown also worked at the Royal Prince Alfred Hospital, Sydney, the Mater Hospital at Newcastle, as well as Melbourne University.

== Career ==
Brown was the head of department from 1987 to 2013 at Monash University. She was later the Director of International Programs from 2004 to 2007, Chair of Residential Services from 1995 to 2004,

Brown specialises in research around family violence, partnership breakdown, including divorce, as well as social work, education and filicide. She received recognition for her research, 'for the contribution she's made to child and family welfare issues that many have shied away from, particularly shining a light on the complex phenomena of filicide, as well as family violence and men's behavioural change", commented Associate Professor Catherine Flynn. Her research has examined if men's behaviour programs lead to reduced domestic violence and behavioural change amongst men. Her research has also involved programs for LGBTQ victims or survivors and perpetrators of domestic violence, providing appropriate solutions and interventions as well as support structures for people who wish to alter their behaviours, given the perception of domestic or family violence can often be that this behaviour is largely occurring in heterosexual families.

Brown's research on partnership breakdown resulted in changes in the Family Court programs in Australia, as well as changes in legislation, including the Family Law Legislation Amendment, in 2011.

Since 2013, Brown has been professor emerita at the Monash Deakin Filicide research Hub, which centres around searching for solutions and patterns around why parents kill children. The goal is to find patterns or behaviours that may enable prevention programs, and her research has uncovered many patterns around situations, familial and social, that lead to a higher likelihood of filicide and family violence. Brown has been on Commonwealth and state committees around the policy of social work, including family violence, filicide and family breakdown.

== Publications ==
Brown has published numerous books and peer-reviewed journal articles, including the following:

- Brown and Alexander, (2020) Child Abuse and Family Law.
- Brown, T., Tyson, D. and Arias, P.F. (2014), Filicide and Parental Separation and Divorce. Child Abuse Rev., 23: 79–88. https://doi.org/10.1002/car.2327
- Bagshaw, D., Brown, T., Wendt, S., Campbell, A., McInnes, E., Tinning, B., Batagol, B., Sifris, A., Tyson, D., Baker, J., & Arias, P. F. (2011). The Effect of Family Violence on Post-separation Parenting Arrangements: The Experiences and Views of Children and Adults from Families Who Separated Post-1995 and Post-2006. Family Matters, (86), 49–61. https://doi/10.3316/informit.702873923415841
- DiPasquale, S.A. Uricoli, B., DiCerbo, M.C., Brown, T.L., Byrne, M.E. (2021) Controlled Release of Multiple Therapeutics From Silicone Hydrogel Contact Lenses for Post-Cataract/Post-Refractive Surgery and Uveitis Treatment. Trans. Vis. Sci. Tech. 10(14):5. https://doi.org/10.1167/tvst.10.14.5.

Brown, with co-authors Tyson, Fendandez Arias and Razali, published an editorial in Frontiers in Psychology, in 2023, synthesizing global research on differences in filicide across various countries, and states within Australia. The editorial discussed reasons why the filicides may have taken place, and steps or programs which may possibly be introduced to prevent the filicide by a parent, stepparent or equivalent guardian. Research from Ghana, Malaysia, Sweden and Australia was described and synthesized, along with causal factors associated with filicide, as well as differences in victims and perpetrators.

== Awards and recognition ==
- 2024 - Order of Australia - King's Birthday honours.
