= Karen Canfell =

Australian epidemiologist and cancer researcher

Professor Karen Canfell AC FAHMS

Personal details
- Occupation: Epidemiologist, cancer researcher

Karen Canfell is an Australian epidemiologist and cancer researcher. After being awarded a D.Phil. from Oxford in 2004 with a thesis entitled Use of hormone replacement therapy as a potential co-factor in the neoplastic progression of HPV-related cervical disease, Canfell returned to Australia to work for the Cancer Council in Sydney where she continued to work on cervical cancer in particular and all its ramifications, as well as the epidemiology of breast and other cancers.

== Screening for Human Papilloma Virus ==
With the advent of HPV vaccines and the mass HPV vaccination programs in Australia for girls (starting in 2007) and boys (starting in 2013) to prevent HPV infection, her interests turned to monitoring the effects of such programs, appropriate screening for cervical cancer in Australia and other countries. A major focus has been how to do this effectively in developing and low-income countries as well as in high-income countries.

Together with her team, her work was fundamental in Australia making the 2017 transition of their national cervical screening program from cytology (pap smears) to a 5-yearly HPV DNA-based screening, and her work both with respect to other countries and in Australia means that Australia is on track to eliminate cervical cancer by 2028.

== Career ==
Canfell worked for the NSW Cancer Council from approximately 2004 to 2011. By 2012, she was affiliated with both the Cancer Research Division of the Cancer Council and the School of Public Health at the University of Sydney. By 2013, she was a professor at UNSW (Prince of Wales Clinical School) and continued there until at least 2019.

From approximately 2020, she has been the director of The Daffodil Centre at the University of Sydney (a joint venture with the Cancer Council). She is a co-leader of the World Health Organization (WHO) Cervical Cancer Elimination Modelling Consortium.

Canfell is a member of the NHMRC Public Health and Health Systems Committee 2024–2027.

== Awards ==
In 2019 she was elected a Fellow of the Australian Academy of Health and Medical Science, and in 2020 won an Elizabeth Blackburn Investigator grant award for leadership in Health Services Research. In 2015 she won the National Health and Medical Research Council National Award for Research Excellence and was also nominated that year as a Woman of Influence by Westpac and the Australian Financial Review.

In 2021, she was invited to give the prestigious Richard Doll Seminar at Oxford where she spoke as co-leader of the World Health Organization (WHO) Cervical Cancer Elimination Modelling Consortium on the topic of the WHO's strategy for the elimination of cervical cancer (The road to cervical cancer elimination).

Canfell was appointed a Companion of the Order of Australia in the 2024 King's Birthday Honours for "eminent service to medicine as an epidemiologist, particularly through cancer research, to tertiary education, and as a mentor and leader".

== Selected publications ==
- Brisson, M; Kim, JJ; Canfell, K; Drolet, M; Gingras, G; Burger, EA; Martin, D; Simms, KT; Bénard, É; Boily, MC; Sy, S; Regan, C; Keane, A; Caruana, M; Nguyen, DTN; Smith, MA; Laprise, JF; Jit, M; Alary, M; Bray, F; Fidarova, E; Elsheikh, F; Bloem, PJN; Broutet, N; Hutubessy, R (2020). "Impact of HPV vaccination and cervical screening on cervical cancer elimination: a comparative modelling analysis in 78 low-income and lower-middle-income countries". Lancet. 395: 575–590. doi:10.1016/S0140-6736(20)30068-4. PMC 7043009. PMID 32007141.
- Canfell, K; Kim, JJ; Brisson, M; Keane, A; Simms, KT; Caruana, M; Burger, EA; Martin, D; Nguyen, DTN; Bénard, É; Sy, S; Regan, C; Drolet, M; Gingras, G; Laprise, JF; Torode, J; Smith, MA; Fidarova, E; Trapani, D; Bray, F; Ilbawi, A; Broutet, N; Hutubessy, R (2020). "Mortality impact of achieving WHO cervical cancer elimination targets: a comparative modelling analysis in 78 low-income and lower-middle-income countries". Lancet. 395: 591–603. doi:10.1016/S0140-6736(20)30157-4. PMC 7043006. PMID 32007142.
- Simms, KT; Steinberg, J; Caruana, M; Smith, MA; Lew, JB; Soerjomataram, I; Castle, PE; Bray, F; Canfell, K (2019). "Impact of scaled up human papillomavirus vaccination and cervical screening and the potential for global elimination of cervical cancer in 181 countries, 2020-99: a modelling study". Lancet Oncol. 20: 394–407. doi:10.1016/S1470-2045(18)30836-2. PMID 30795950..
- Bosch, FX; Broker, TR; Forman, D; Moscicki, AB; Gillison, ML; Doorbar, J; Stern, PL; Stanley, M; Arbyn, M; Poljak, M; Cuzick, J; Castle, PE; Schiller, JT; Markowitz, LE; Fisher, WA; Canfell, K; Denny, LA; Franco, EL; Steben, M; Kane, MA; Schiffman, M; Meijer, CJ; Sankaranarayanan, R; Castellsagué, X; Kim, JJ; Brotons, M; Alemany, L; Albero, G; Diaz, M; de Sanjosé, S (2013). "Comprehensive control of human papillomavirus infections and related diseases". Vaccine. 31 Suppl 6: G1-31. doi:10.1016/j.vaccine.2013.10.002. PMID 24331817..
