= Kathryn Rodden =

Australian conservationist

Kathryn Minette Rodden
- Employer: Self Employed
- Known for: Sustainability and conservation

Kathryn "Kaye" Minette Rodden AOM, is an Australian conservationist who is a founding member of Baraboo Hills Landcare Group and a board member of Corangamite Catchment Management Authority. She was awarded a United Nations prize for her Rabbit Action Plan in Victoria. She was awarded an Order of Australia for "services to conservation" in June 2024.

== Education and career ==
Rodden was raised on a farm, located within the Yarra Valley, and moved to a sheep farm on the Barwon River.

Rodden graduated from La Trobe University. Her doctorate thesis was written about the nutrition of trace elements of the diet of grazing animals, such as sheep. She also was awarded an honours degree in Agricultural Science, as well as a Diploma of Education. Rodden also holds a Master Tree Grower certificate.

Rodden works in conservation, sustainability and landcare in the regional areas of south west Victoria, Australia. She is a member of Landcare a community-government synthesis model of natural resource management, which involves governance across local community members.

Rodden was also involved in the Management Committee, Geelong Landcare Network from 2019 to 2022, as well as Australian Landcare International from 2013 to 2016. She was the Director of the Australian Agroforestry Foundation, from 2012 to 2015, and Chair of the Otway Agroforestry Network, from 2011 to 2015.

== Awards and recognition ==
- 2019 - United Nations award for Rabbit Action Network
- 2021 - Joan Kirner award - highly commended - Landcare
- 2021 - Victorian volunteer award - nominated.
- 2024 - Medal of the Order of Australia
