= Kathleen Clapham =

Australian anthropologist and health researcher

Kathleen Frances Clapham
- Education: University of Sydney
- Occupations: Anthropologist; health researcher
- Employer: University of Wollongong
- Known for: Indigenous Health
- Title: Professor

Kathleen Frances Clapham AM is an Indigenous Australian anthropologist and health researcher, who was the recipient of an Order of Australia, for services to "indigenous community health and tertiary education". She is the founding director of both the Ngarruwan Ngadjul: First People's Health and Wellbeing Research Centre as well as Professor of Indigenous Health at the University of Wollongong.

== Education and career ==
Clapham's father was the source of her drive and passion for education, and inspired her to work in academia. She is a descendant of the Murrawarri people, who are based in the north-west of New South Wales, Australia.

Clapham received a Bachelor of Arts (hons) from the University of Sydney, in 1981, and a PhD in anthropology, from the University of Sydney, in 1990. She has been Professor (Indigenous Health) at the University of Wollongong since 2007, and is an Honorary Professorial Fellow at the George Institute for Global Health since 2010, in the Injury Division.

She has worked in improving health and learning of Aboriginal and Torres Strait Islander students, combined with a focus on improving the health and access to health care, across Australia. Her research has focused on the delivery and accessibility of health care in Indigenous communities and community health care. Clapham is the founding Director of the Ngarruwan Ngadjul: First People's Health and Wellbeing Research Centre at the University of Wollongong and is a Professor of Indigenous Health.

Her research in indigenous health focuses on social factors and determinants which contribute towards health, and she advocates for Indigenous world views, such as self-determination, autonomy, and social justice.

Clapham has been a chief investigator on 12 NHMRC and ARC-funded studies, with a total of more than $17.5 million in grant funding as of July 2024. She is the primary investigator of an ARC research project, which has the goal of creating a 'place based' model for solutions to complex health and social issues, that are community led.

She focuses on health services improvements and community-led solutions to complex health and social issues. She has developed strong partnerships with Aboriginal community organizations, particularly in southeastern New South Wales. She has worked on projects to prevent injury of Aboriginal children, based on community-led solutions. She has delivered many place-based solutions, which is a strength of local communities.

"These local communities have got good linkages and good communication between each other, and so are able to operate in a different way than government and non-Aboriginal organisations,"

== Publications ==
Clapham has over 1300 citations and an H-index of 20, according to Google Scholar, as of July 2024

- Clapham, Kathleen; Senior, Kate; Longbottom, Marlene; Bessarab, Dawn; Fredericks, Bronwyn; Harwood, Valerie; Sheppeard, Fiona; Haynes, Bronte; Wellington, Kaitlen; Kelly, Peter (1 September 2024). "Shifting sands: Indigenous conceptions of health and place in fragile times". Health & Place. 89 103308. doi:10.1016/j.healthplace.2024.103308. hdl:11343/349575. ISSN 1353-8292. PMID 38972267.
- Young, Christian; Burgess, Leonie; Falster, Kathleen; Zoega, Helga; Banks, Emily; Clapham, Kathleen; Woolfenden, Sue; Cutmore, Mandy; Williamson, Anna (6 May 2024). "Mental health–related service and medicine use among a cohort of urban Aboriginal children and young people: Data linkage study". Australian & New Zealand Journal of Psychiatry. doi:10.1177/00048674241248357. ISSN 0004-8674.
- Cullen, Patricia; Mackean, Tamara; Walker, Natasha; Coombes, Julieann; Bennett-Brook, Keziah; Clapham, Kathleen; Ivers, Rebecca; Hackett, Maree; Worner, Faye; Longbottom, Marlene (October 2022). "Integrating Trauma and Violence Informed Care in Primary Health Care Settings for First Nations Women Experiencing Violence: A Systematic Review". Trauma, Violence, & Abuse. 23 (4): 1204–1219. doi:10.1177/1524838020985571. hdl:1959.4/102451. ISSN 1524-8380. PMID 33573523.

== Awards & recognition ==
- 2024 - Order of Australia - King's Birthday honours.
- 2022 - Australia Day Awards.
- 2021 - First Nations Health, Wellbeing and Health Services Research Award.
