= Kathy Eagar =

Australian researcher and academic

Kathy Eagar AM
- Other name: Kathleen Margaret Eagar
- Education: University of Wollongong
- Employer: University of Wollongong
- Known for: Health Services
- Title: Professor

Kathleen Margaret Eagar AM, known as Kathy Eagar, is an Australian clinician and health services academic, who was awarded an Order of Australia in 2024 for services to health services. She was professor of health services research at the University of Wollongong until 2023.

== Education and career ==
Eagar received her degree at the University of Wollongong, where she was a professor at the Australian Health Services Research Institute from 1998 to 2023.

She has published numerous publications on palliative and end of life care, policy and research around better health care, chronic diseases and aged care.

Eagar has commented that the main audience to which health services research should be focused would ideally be politicians and consumers.

== Publications ==
Eagar written over 500 publications, with over 4,000 citations, as at July 2024 and an H-index of 35. Select publications include:

- Eagar Kathy, Watters Prue, Currow David C., Aoun Samar M., Yates Patsy (2010) The Australian Palliative Care Outcomes Collaboration (PCOC) – measuring the quality and outcomes of palliative care on a routine basis. Australian Health Review 34, 186–192.
- Green, J.P. and Eagar, K. (2010), The health of people in Australian immigration detention centres. Medical Journal of Australia, 192: 65–70.
- Eagar, K.; Gordon, R.; Hodkinson, A.; Green, J.; Eagar, L.; Erven, J.; Eckstein, G.; Spooner, G.; Kennedy, C.; Owen, A.; Cromwell, D.; Leotta, T.; and Rigley, A., "The Australian National Sub-Acute and Non-Acute Patient Classification (AN-SNAP): Report of the National Sub-Acute and Non-Acute Casemix Classification Study" (1997). Centre for Health Service Development - CHSD. Paper 7. http://ro.uow.edu.au/chsd/7

== Awards ==
- 2024 - Order of Australia.
- 2015 - HSRAANZ Professional award for health services.
