= Elizabeth Kendall (disability academic) =

Australian disability researcher

Elizabeth Kendall AM
- Education: University of Queensland
- Occupation: Academic
- Employer: Griffith University
- Known for: Disability research
- Title: Professor
- Website: https://experts.griffith.edu.au/18657-elizabeth-kendall

Elizabeth Kendall AM is a disability researcher, founding director of the Hopkins Centre, and professor at Griffith University. She was appointed a Member of the Order of Australia in June 2024 for "significant service to rehabilitation research, to people with disability, and to tertiary education".

== Early life and education ==
Kendall received her PhD, from the University of Queensland, and won the Dean's Commendation for Outstanding PhD Thesis, for her research on adjustment after traumatic injury, in 1997.

Kendall is a disability and rehabilitation researcher, based at the Hopkins Centre, where she is also the leader of Inclusive Futures: Reimagining Disability initiative at Griffith University. Her research in disability care and recovery has contributed to improvements and sustainable developments in improving the lives of people with disability. Her career and research focus has on improving and enabling the kinds of technologies which lead to creating inclusive environments and workplaces.

Kendall was the chair of the Social Behavioural and Economic Sciences Panel, for the Australian Research Council College of Experts, and the chair of the Disability Advisory Committee.

Kendall was invited to be a visiting professor at the University of Manchester, at the National Primary Care Research and Development Centre, and she is also a member of the ARC college of experts.

== Publications ==
Kendall has over 200 publications, and H-index of 52 and over 10,643 citations, according to Google Scholar, as at July 2024. She also has over 65 industry reports.

Select publications include:

- McKimmie A, Hicks AJ, Hill R, Romero L, Ponsford JL, Lannin NA, Gabbe BJ, Cameron PA, Cooper DJ, Rushworth N, Fitzgerald M, O'Brien TJ.The Australian Traumatic Brain Injury Initiative: Systematic Review and Consensus Process to Determine the Predictive Value of Pre-existing Health Conditions for People with Moderate-Severe Traumatic Brain Injury (2024) JOURNAL OF NEUROTRAUMA15 Antonic-Baker A, Auvrez C, Tao G, Bagg MK, Gadowski A, 10.1089/NEU.2023.0462.
- Whitty JA, Littlejohns P, Ratcliffe J, Rixon K, Wilson A, Kendall E, Burton P, Chalkidou K, Scuffham PA (2023) Impact of information and deliberation on the consistency of preferences for prioritization in health care - evidence from discrete choice experiments undertaken alongside citizens' juries. JOURNAL OF MEDICAL ECONOMICS26(1):1237–1249.
- Kendall E (2023) Overview of NDIS in Queensland and Priority Actions Griffith University.
- Norwood, M. F., Lakhani, A., & Kendall, E. (2022). ‘Almost pooped on — dislike!’: student and teacher reactions to nature-based learning and resulting practical advice for implementing in secondary schools. Journal of Adventure Education and Outdoor Learning, 22(4), 298–312.
- Kendall, E. (1996). Psychosocial Adjustment Following Closed Head Injury: A Model for Understanding Individual Differences and Predicting Outcome. Neuropsychological Rehabilitation, 6(2), 101–132. https://doi.org/10.1080/713755502.
- Joyce Y. Caldwell, BS, Jamie D. Davis, PhD, Barbara Du Bois, PhD, Holly Echo-Hawk, MS, Jill Shephard Erickson, MSW, ACSW, R. Turner Goins, PhD, Calvin Hill, BS, Walter Hillabrant, PhD, Sharon R. Johnson, MA, Elizabeth Kendall, PhD, Kelly Keemer, BS, Spero M. Manson, PhD, Catherine A. Marshall, PhD, Paulette Running Wolf, PhD, Rolando L. Santiago, PhD, Robert Schacht, PhD, and Joseph B. Stone, PhD (2005) Culturally Competent Research with American Indians and Alaska Natives: Findings and Recommendations of the First Symposium of the Work Group on American Indian Research and Program Evaluation Methodology. Vol 12. Issue 1. doi: 10.5820/aian.1201.2005.1

== Awards and recognition ==
- 2024 – Kings Birthday Member of the Order of Australia.
- 2023 – ARC Expert Panel for Social and Behavioural Sciences.
- 2001 – Medal for Contribution to Logan Community.
- 1998 – Outstanding PhD Thesis - Dean's commendation.
