= Jan Klein =

Czech-American immunologist (1936–2023)

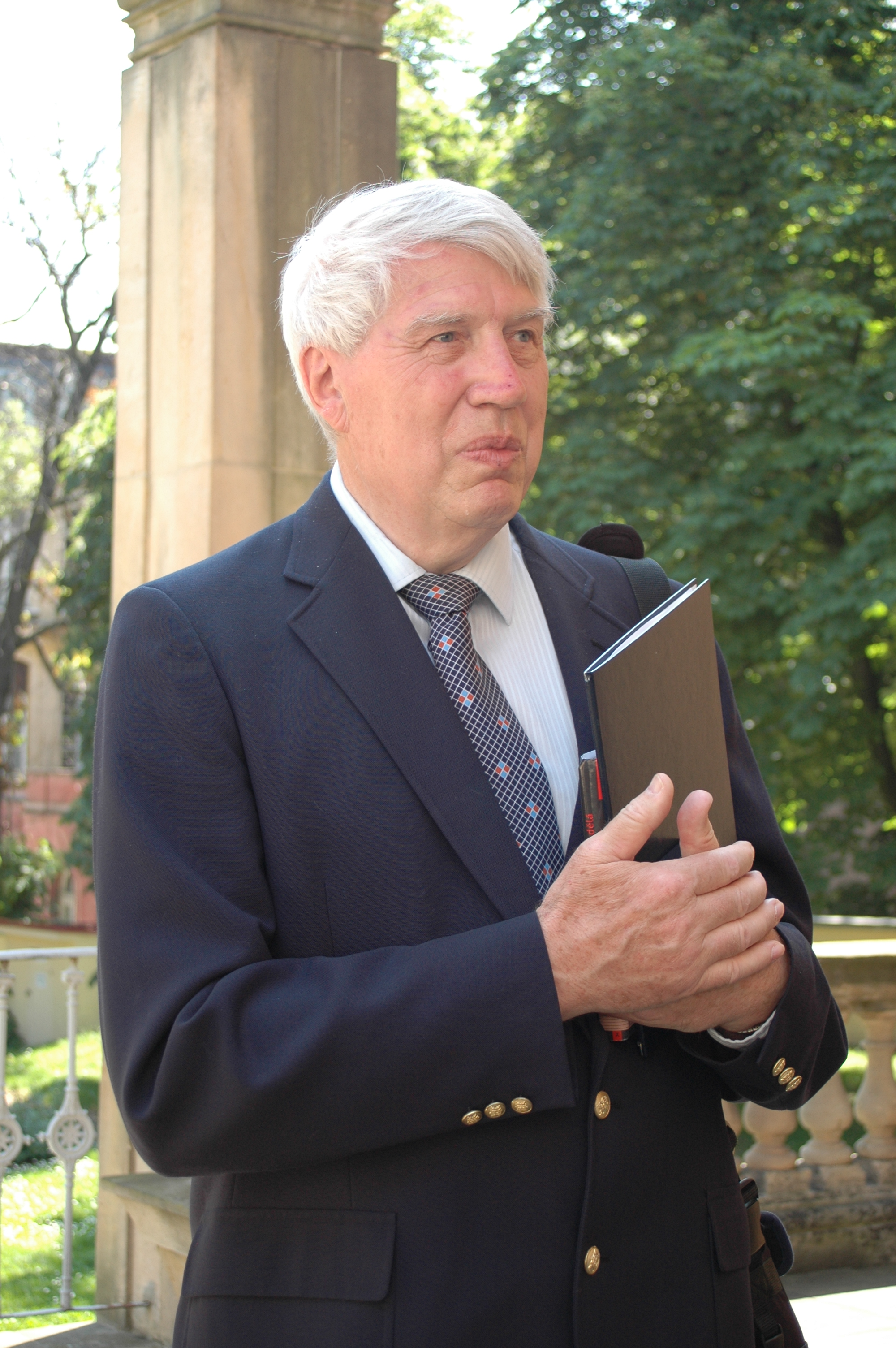
- Jan in 2006
- Born: January 18, 1936; Štemplovec, Opava, Czech Republic
- Died: May 7, 2023 (aged 87); State College, Pennsylvania, U.S.
- Education: Czechoslovak Academy of Sciences; Charles University
- Known for: genetics, immunology, evolutionary biology, Mhc, trans-species polymorphism
- Awards: Neuron Prize (2018); Gregor Johann Mendel Medal (2004); Jan Evangelista Purkyne Medal (1985)
- Scientific career
- Workplaces: Pennsylvania State University; Max-Planck-Institut für Biologie; University of Texas Southwestern Medical School; University of Michigan

Jan Klein (January 18, 1936 – May 7, 2023) was a Czech–American immunologist.

== Professional life ==
Jan Klein was a Czech-American immunologist, best known for his work on the major histocompatibility complex (MHC). He was born in 1936 in Stemplovec, Opava, Czech Republic. He graduated from the Charles University at Prague, in 1955, and received his M.S. (magna cum laude) in botany from the same school in 1958. He was a teacher at the Neruda High School in Prague from 1958 to 1961. He received his Ph.D. in genetics from the Czechoslovak Academy of Sciences in 1965, and moved to Stanford University as a postdoctoral fellow in 1968. He became assistant professor in 1969, and associate professor in 1973 at the University of Michigan. He assumed the position of professor at the University of Texas Southwestern Medical School in 1975. From 1977 to his retirement in 2004, he was the director of the Max-Planck-Institut für Biologie at Tübingen, Germany. From 2004 to his death in 2023, he was a Frances R. and Helen M. Pentz Visiting Professor of Science and adjunct professor of biology at the Pennsylvania State University.

== Research interests ==
Klein's scientific output encompasses 600 publications in scientific journals and a dozen of books, which he either authored or edited. It spans three major disciplines: genetics, immunology, and evolutionary biology, as well as one interface discipline: immunogenetics. His major research focus was on the major histocompatibility complex, (MHC or Mhc), which comprises series of genes, which play a critical part in the initiation of the adaptive immune response (AIS), exemplified by the production of antibodies specific for different pathogens.

== Major accomplishments ==
=== Redefinition of Immunology ===
In his textbooks and other writings, Klein introduced a new concept of immunology, in which he conceived the discipline as a branch of biological sciences, rather than as a narrow province of medical studies, as it had been represented traditionally. He defined immunology as the science of self-nonself discrimination, concerned not just with the human species and its animal models (mouse, rabbit, and others), but with all organisms; and not just with issues of human health, but with normal physiological functions, executed with specialized body systems. He was the first to include in an immunology textbook sections emphasizing the importance of the so-called non-adaptive immune system (NAIS; he preferred to call it non-anticipatory). He also gave immunology a logical internal structure. Instead of organizing his textbooks into sections such as immunochemistry, immunobiology, immunogenetics, immunopathology, and so on, as was then customary (i.e., according to immunology’s interfaces with other disciplines and leaving very little for immunology itself), he presented it as a self-contained science. He organized it as a science operating with specialized organs, cells, genes, molecules, mechanisms, phenotypes, and functions.

=== Redefinition of Immunogenetics ===
In his experimental work, his 25 years as a director of the Immunogenetics Division of the Max Planck Institute of Biology, and nearly the same period of time at the helm of the journal Immunogenetics, Klein strived to redefine the immunogenetics discipline. Immunogenetics emerged in the 1930s as the study of genes controlling antigens (such as those of the various blood group systems) detected by antibodies. This was a very artificial delineation of a discipline, based essentially on a method, rather than on an internal content. In Klein's conception, immunogenetics was to deal with what immunology and genetics have in common—a set of genes that control and effect immune responses of any kind.

=== Discovery of Class II Genes and the Concept of Mhc ===
In the adaptive immune system, the three preeminent sets of genes are those that code for the Mhc, T-cell receptor (Tcr), and B-cell receptor (Bcr, the antibodies) proteins. Klein contributed to the study of all three systems, but his primary interest was in the Mhc system. He developed the modern concept of the Mhc as consisting of two principal kinds of gene, for which he coined the designations class I and class II genes. The class I genes were discovered in 1936 (the year Jan Klein was born) as coding for blood group (red blood cell) antigens, which, however, were also responsible for the rejection of incompatible grafts. Klein, with his coworker Vera Hauptfeld and his wife Dagmar Klein, were the first to describe the product of the class II genes and identify them as the molecules that control level of antibodies synthesized in response to foreign antigens. Earlier, Hugh O. McDevitt and his coworkers mapped an Immune response-1 (Ir-1) locus influencing the level of antibody production against the synthetic polypeptide (T,G)-L—A into the Mhc. Klein and his coworkers, finding their locus inseparable from the postulated Ir-1 locus, concluded that the class II antigens they demonstrated on the surfaces of lymphocytes were the product of the Ir-1 locus. Later studies confirmed this interpretation. Genetic mapping of the loci controlling the class I and class II antigens of the mouse showed them to be part of a cluster, which Klein mapped to the chromosome 17 and for which he championed the name major histocompatibility locus, Mhc. The name referred to the fact that the genes were part of a set that controlled tissue compatibility and in this set one cluster had the strongest (major) effect. George D. Snell named the tissue compatibility genes histocompatibility 1, 2, 3, etc., in the order of discovery, and since the H2 genes happened to be strongest of the set, they became the first Mhc known. All other histocompatibility genes came to be called minor.

Initially, genetic mapping of the mouse class I antigens suggested the existence of multiple class I loci in the H2 complex. Soon, however, inconsistencies in the assignment of certain antigens to loci signaled that something was amiss with the H2 maps, as they were then drawn. Klein and Donald C. Shreffler solved the problem by demonstrating that a given antigen could be present on molecules controlled by different loci. Taking this finding into account, they were able to reduce the number of the class I loci to two, H2K and H2D. This "two-locus model" played a n important part in subsequent interpretations of the Mhc. The model was also consistent with the results of earlier Klein's PhD work, in which he discovered that immune selection for a loss of certain H2 antigens on somatic cells was accompanied by the loss of some but not other unselected antigens. In this respect, the antigens fell into two groups as if carried by two different molecules. The discovery of the class II genes had been fitted into the model by the demonstration that they mapped between the H2K and the H2D. Shreffler also demonstrated the existence of another locus mapping between the two class I loci. It coded for what he called the "serum serological" or Ss protein, present in a soluble form in the blood fluid phase, in contrast to the class I and class II antigens, which were expressed on cell surfaces. At that stage, the H2 complex could be divided into four regions: class I (H2K)...Class II (Ir-1)...Ss...Class I (H2D).

These developments alerted immunologists on the one hand and transplantation biologists on the other of the Mhc’s potential importance for their respective disciplines. The consequence was a proliferation of reports describing association of a variety of phenomena with the complex. The associations were demonstrated by testing the responses of congenic strains differing at the H2 complex and mapping the genes controlling the responses within the H2 complex with the help of strains carrying H2 haplotypes derived by intra-H2 recombinations. These strains were developed by George D. Snell, Jack H. Stimpfling, Donald C. Shreffler, and Jan Klein. The phenomena included control of antibody response to a variety of antigens, both natural and synthetic; suppression of immune response by special suppressor cells or soluble factors; proliferation of lymphocytes in an in vitro culture challenged with H2-incompatible stimulating cell (the so-called mixed lymphocyte reaction, MLR); killing of H2-icompatible target cells by sensitized lymphocytes (cell-mediated lymphocytotoxicity, CML); response of transplanted immune cell against the tissues of the host (graft versus host reaction, GVHR); rejection of H2-incompatible grafts (skin, heart, bone marrow, etc.) by the recipients; and others. All these phenomena appeared to be controlled by different loci within the Mhc. As a result, the H2 complex appeared to expand by the addition of new loci (regions). Klein's group, however, challenged this interpretation and in a series of carefully controlled studies demonstrated that the new loci were in reality mirages generated by various forms of interaction involving the established class I and class II loci. In this manner, Klein contracted the H2 complex back to the version established by the serological methods, and propounded the view that the various responses (MLR, CML, etc.) were controlled by the class I and class II loci, rather than by separate loci. Later, other loci were again mapped within the H2 complex and these were no phantoms. They were real but, as Klein argued, they were unrelated to the class I and class II loci and ended up in the region by chance. The general opinion was, however, that they represented the class III region of the Mhc, that they were functionally related to the Mhc by being involved in immune response, and that the complex functioned as an immune supergene. The first of these class III loci was the Ss locus, which was later identified as coding for complement component 4. The C4 protein was indeed involved in immunity by being one in a series of protein molecules that attach to a cell-bound antibody to puncture a hole in it and thus kill it. But nobody could come up with a reason why it had to be linked to the class I or class II genes to function properly. Similar arguments could be applied to the other class III genes. Later, Klein's view received a strong support when his group discovered that in the fishes, which comprise more than half of jawed vertebrates, not even the class I and class II genes were in a single cluster and the class III genes were scattered all over the genome. Ultimately, the modern concept prevailed against the tendencies to make the Mhc unnecessarily nonparsimonious.

=== Nature of the Mhc-controlled Immune Response ===
The control of antibody response by the Mhc raised many question. The one on the top of immunologists’ agenda was: Why were some individuals carrying a certain H2 haplotype high responders to a given antigen, while others, carrying certain other haplotype were low responders or nonresponders? The phenomenon could be reproduced in vitro by the exposure to the antigen. Lymphocytes isolated from the high responder proliferated to a much higher degree than those isolated from a low responder individual. The assay required, in addition to the thymus-derived (T) lymphocytes, also "macrophages" or antigen-presenting cells (APCs) from the same individual. In this set-up the question reduced itself to: Are the T lymphocytes or the APCs responsible for the difference in responsiveness? Many immunologists were inclined to put the blame on the APCs, but the Klein-Nagy group, in a series of elegant experiments, falsified this hypothesis and explained why T lymphocytes bearing different Mhc haplotypes might differ in their response to specific antigens. The receptors of the T lymphocytes recognize an antigen in association with their own Mhc molecules. The different specificities of the Tcrs born by the individual T cells are generated by a special mechanism during the lymphocyte development from precursor cells in the thymus. The generation is entirely random, so that receptors arise against all possible antigens, including those borne by the individual in which the differentiation takes place (the self-molecules). The cells with receptors for self-molecules must be eliminated to prevent an immune reaction against the individual's own components. The eliminated Tcrs might, however, by chance have had the capability of recognizing certain foreign antigens (nonself) in association with the nonresponder’ own Mhc molecules. The T-cell repertoire thus has "blind spots", making an individual nonresponsive not only to self but also against certain foreign antigens.

=== Mhc Polymorphism, Variation in Chromosome Numbers, and t-haplotypes ===
Typing of inbred strains suggested that the Mhc might manifest unusually high variability (polymorphism). Inbred strains were, however, not suited for determining polymorphism, because assessing it required measuring gene frequencies in populations. There were all sorts of problems associated with such an effort, most of which could, however, be alleviated by transferring a sample of H2 haplotypes from wild mice onto inbred (C57BL/10 or B10) background and thus producing a set of congenic B10.W lines. These lines proved to be essential for the complete characterization of the new haplotypes; for the identification of natural intra-H2 recombinants; and for their use as a tool for mapping H2-associated traits. Using a variety of methods, Klein and his colleagues were able to characterize H2 polymorphism in populations of wild mice from different parts of the world. The studies revealed that the polymorphism was indeed staggering, both in the number of alleles and haplotypes (a haplotype being a particular combination of alleles borne by a particular chromosomal segment) that occurred in appreciable frequencies in the populations. Exceptions from the high polymorphism were found only in certain island populations and in populations that have passed recently through a bottleneck phase. The H2 polymorphism, in combination with other markers, could then be used to characterize a population. H2- typing of the global wild mice population revealed it to be fragmented into a large number of small subpopulations (demes), which differed in the presence and frequencies of alleles at the individual loci. Skin grafting and other methods indicated inbreeding within the demes, but sharing of certain alleles between the demes suggested a continuous gene flow between demes.

These findings were supported by analyses of other markers, primarily chromosomal polymorphism and t-haplotypes. The karyotype of the house mouse normally consists of 40 telocentric chromosomes, but in certain regions in Europe, mice with karyotypes containing fewer than 40 chromosomes can be found. The reduction in chromosome number is due to centric fusion (Robertsonian translocation) of two telocentrics into a single metacentric. Klein's group found populations with metacentric chromosomes in different regions of Europe, but concentrated its effort on the system of metacentrics in southern Germany. An in-depth study of these populations revealed subdivision into subpopulations, which correlated with that established by the studies of H2 polymorphism.

A t-haplotype is a designation for a chromosomal region adjacent to or encompassing the H2 complex. Three features characterize the t region: suppression of recombination over the entire length of a complete t-haplotype; segregation distortion (t/+ males transmit the t-chromosome into more than 90 percent of their progeny); and frequent presence of homozygous lethal genes. Klein group's combined t and H2 studies on wild mice from all over the world led to the identification and characterization of a number of new t-haplotypes. Their characterization demonstrated that all the haplotypes were derived from a single ancestral haplotype; that the ancestral haplotype originated in the western European Mus domesticus; that it arose recently; and that from M. domesticus a single t-haplotype introgressed into the eastern European M. musculus, where it then underwent limited diversification.

=== Trans-species Polymorphism ===
Dictionaries define genetic polymorphism as the presence, in appreciable frequencies, of two or more alleles at a locus in a species. Hence H2 polymorphism was expected to have arisen by an unusually high mutation (evolutionary) rate in the house mouse after its divergence from its nearest relative. There was, however, no indication that this was the case. On the contrary, Klein and his co-workers found, by the methods then available, indistinguishable alleles in the two European house mouse species, Mus domesticus and M. musculus, which diverged from each other some 1–2 million years (my) ago. Similarly, in M. domesticus populations, whose divergence times could be dated, they found no new variants. Klein's group could also not find any new Mhc (HLA) variants in isolated human populations such as those of the South American Indians and the indigenous populations of Siberia. These and other observations led Klein to the formulation of the trans-species polymorphism (TSP) hypothesis positing that the divergence of similar Mhc alleles predates the divergence of the species in which they occur. The original detection of trans-species polymorphism relied on serological (antibody-based) identification of antigenic molecules. Later, however, the identity of alleles in different species could be confirmed by peptide-mapping analysis of the antigenic proteins. Ultimately, DNA-sequencing not only confirmed the results obtained with the earlier methods, but also introduced a new dimension into the TSP studies. The tests revealed that closely related species such as M. domesticus and M. musculus, the many haplochromine fish species in East African lakes and rivers, or Darwin's finches on the Galapagos Islands, shared many alleles at not only the Mhc, but also at some of the non-Mhc loci. In more distantly related species, such as human and chimpanzee or the house mouse and the Norwegian rat, sharing of identical alleles could no longer be demonstrated, but shared related alleles were clearly in evidence. This finding led to the concept of allelic lineages, in which members of a given lineage in one species were more similar to members of the same lineage in another species than they were to other alleles in either of the two species, TSP of Mhc and other loci has since been documented in many species and found applications to a variety of issues in evolutionary biology.

=== Applications of the TSP Concept in Evolutionary Biology ===
The essence of the TSP concept is that a certain number of alleles at a locus must pass through the speciation phase from the ancestral to the descendant species to assure the retention of the ancestral polymorphism in the new species. If this number is known, the size of the founding population of the emerging species can be estimated. The TSP thus provides a window into the otherwise poorly accessible phase of evolution. Klein's group used the TSP concept to estimate the founding population sizes of several species. For the human species, the size estimated from the HLA polymorphism was 10,000 breeding individuals. Similarly large founding populations had to be postulated for the two lineages from which most of the hundreds of species inhabiting Lake Victoria in East Africa had diverged. And even for Darwin's finches, widely believed to have arisen from a single pair of founders, Vincek and his colleagues came to the conclusion that the founding flock was at least 30 heads strong.

These studies became Klein's bridge to evolutionary biology. He crossed this bridge in a series of investigations into the nature of the speciation process in Darwin's finches and in haplochromine fishes of East Africa. With Akie Sato and collaborators, they provided molecular evidence that the 14 extant species of Darwin's finches on the Galapagos Islands and the one species on the Cocos Island were all derived from a single ancestral species that arrived on the islands some 5 my ago. They identified the ancestral species as being related to Tiaris obscura, a species now inhabiting Ecuador and other parts of the South American continent. Using DNA markers they were able to determine phylogenetic relationships among the extant Darwin's finches, except for the group of Ground finches. In the latter, the morphologically poorly distinguishable species were indistinguishable at the molecular level. This result could mean either that the species diverged quite recently and that the polymorphisms of their genomes have not have had enough time to sort themselves out among the species, or that the species continue exchanging genes.

Haplochromines are one of two main groups of cichlid fishes in East Africa; the other group being the tilapiine fishes. Klein and his associates studied both groups and using a variety of molecular markers contributed to the resolution of their phylogenetic relationships. They then focused on the haplochromines of both the lakes, large and small, and the rivers. The studies revealed degree of relatedness between the various groups that correlated roughly with their geographical distribution. The main focus of Klein's group became Lake Victoria, however. The lake is the youngest of all the large lakes in East Africa, its latest refill after a desiccation dated to 14,600 years ago. The lake is inhabited with more 200 haplochromine species distinguishable morphologically and behaviorally. Contrary to earlier claims, Klein's group demonstrated that the species are not monophyletic and are by no means pauperized in their genetic polymorphism. They fall into at least two lineages, which separated from each other 41,500 years ago, presumably outside of the lake. The lineages diverged from haplochromines inhabiting smaller lakes west of Lake Victoria more than 80,000 years ago. As in the case of the Ground finches of the Galapagos Islands, the haplochromine species of Lake Victoria are not distinguishable by any molecular markers Klein's group used in their studies. All population genetics methods used to compute genetic distances showed no significant difference between species and between populations of the same species. In this case, however, Klein's group was able to rule out insufficient separation time as the explanation of the data and to argue that the explanation lies in the continuation of a gene flow between the incipient species. They argue further that speciation is a protracted affair during which the arising species diverge in a few genes responsible for phenotypic differences, but continue exchanging genes until the emergence of a reproductive barrier stops the process. They argue furthermore that because of this phenomenon, many phylogenies of so-called adaptive radiations will remain unresolved. One such case is the radiation that gave rise to the tetrapods in the evolution of jawed vertebrates. In this case, Klein's group has demonstrated that increasing the number of genes in the input database does not improve the resolution power of the output phylogenetic trees.

=== Evolution of the Mhc ===
Three critical assumptions underlie the study of Mhc evolution: First, the Mhc is absent in all non-vertebrates. Second, jawless vertebrates (Agnatha) are monophyletic and are a sister group of jawed vertebrates (Gnathostoma). And third, jawless vertebrates lack the Mhc, which is present in all the jawed vertebrates. Klein's group contributed significantly to the current general acceptance of these suppositions. The absence of the Mhc in non-vertebrates became apparent when scrutiny of non-vertebrate genomes failed to identify homologs of Mhc genes. Klein's group provided strong support for agnathan monophyly by cloning, sequencing, and analyzing long DNA stretches of the representative agnathan and gnathostome species. And they isolated, in collaboration with Max Cooper's group, lymphocyte-like cells, cloned, sequenced, and analyzed genes expressed in these cells, and found no evidence for expressed Mhc gene homologs. They did find, however, evidence for gradual evolution of the adaptive immune system. They could demonstrate the presence in jawless vertebrates of several auxiliary components and pathways, which the AIS co-opted when the three central receptors (Mhc, Tcr, and Bcr) emerged in the jawed vertebrates. They also contributed evidence for the omnipresence of Mhc genes in jawed vertebrates by identifying such genes in a wide range of species from bony fishes [zebrafish (Danio rerio), cichlid Aulonocara hansbaenschi, tilapia (Oreochromis niloticus), carp (Cyprinus carpio), guppy (Poecilia reticulata), threespine stickleback (Gasterosteus aculeatus), swordtail (Xiphophorus)]; through coelacanth (Latimeria chalumnae), African lungfish (Protopterus aethiopicus); birds [Bengalese finch (Lonchura striata), Darwin's finches and their South American relatives]; to metatherian mammals [red-necked wallaby (Macropus rufogriseus) and eutherian mammal [rodents such as the mole rat (Spalax ehrenbergi)] and a variety of primates including prosimians, New World monkeys (NWM, Platyrrhini), Old World monkeys (OWM, Catarrhini) and apes]. In several of these species they worked out also the organization of the Mhcs, most notably in the zebrafish.

As for the evolution of the Mhc genes themselves, Klein's group contributed significantly to the description of its general outline. In collaboration with Yoko Satta and Naoyuki Takahata, they developed a method for estimating the evolutionary rates of the Mhc genes and demonstrated that the rate was close to the average rate of most non-Mhc genes, and they provided evidence that the Mhc genes are subject to balancing selection. They also provided evidence that the selection leads to the independent, repeated emergence of similar or identical short sequence motifs by convergent evolution. Klein himself has long championed the view that this mechanism and mechanisms similar to it, rather than the generally favored "gene conversion", explained the origin of the motifs.

Klein's group demonstrated that during its evolution, the Mhc undergoes repeated rounds of expansion and contraction by gene duplications and deletions –in Klein's terminology, an accordion mode of evolution. Thus, for example, they showed that in each of the three major primate lineages – the prosimians, the NWM and the OWM – evolution of some of the class II gene families started anew after a contraction to a single ancestral gene. And on the example of two "class III" genes, C4 and CYP21, they illustrated a mechanism by which the accordion might be expanding and contracting. The C4 gene, as already stated, codes for a component of the complement system; the CYP21gene codes for a key enzyme in the synthesis of glucocorticoid and mineralcorticoid hormones. The two genes are thus unrelated to each other and to the class I and class II genes, but they are accidentally hooked together into a module, which has been found to duplicate or triplicate as a unit during primate evolution. The hook-up seems to have arisen, when an identical short sequence motif arose by chance at both flanks of the initial C4-CYP21 doublet. Since then, an occasional misalignment of the opposite flanks has led to an unequal crossing-over and so to duplications or deletion of the module.

== Honors and awards ==
- 2018 Neuron Prize for Lifelong Contribution to Science – Biology
- 2004 Gregor Johann Mendel Medal, Moravian Museum, Brno
- 1994 Jan Evangelista Purkyne Medal
- 1990 Glaxo Prize for Medical Writing
- 1986 James W. Mclaughlin Medal
- 1986 6th J.F. Heremans Memorial Lecture, Institute of Cellular and Molecular Pathology
- 1985-1990 Member, Institute Scientific Council, ICP
- 1985 5th Maude L. Menten Lecturer, University of Pittsburgh School of Medicine
- 1985 Culpepper Lecturer, University of North Carolina
- 1985 Francois 1er Fonde le College de France Medal
- 1981 Rabbi Shai Shacknai Memorial Prize in Immunology and Cancer Research, Hebrew University of Jerusalem
- 1979 Elisabeth Goldschmid Memorial Lecture, Hebrew University of Jerusalem

== Memberships ==
- 1997–1998, Immunogenetics honorary editor
- 1991, International Mammalian Genome Society founding member
- 1990–1993, Mammalian Genome, editor-in-chief
- 1989–Present, Folia Biologica, member, editorial board
- 1989–1991, EMBO Journal, member, editorial board
- 1988–1995, Cambridge Studies in Evolutionary Biology, member, editorial board
- 1987–1995, Molecular Biology and Evolution, associate editor
- 1987, CRC Critical Reviews in Immunology, member, editorial board
- 1987, National Institutes of Health, member, National Advisory Council of Immunology
- 1985–1990, Mouse Newsletter, member, editorial board
- 1984–1991, International Reviews of Immunology, member, editorial board
- 1984–1990, Bioscience Research Reports, Immunology Series, member, editorial board
- 1983–1997, EOS, Journal of Immunology and Immunopharmacology, member, editorial board
- 1983–1996, Immunological Reviews, member, editorial board
- 1983–1987, Cell, member, editorial board
- 1982–Present, Scandinavian Journal of Immunology, member, editorial board
- 1981–1990, Journal of Craniofacial Genetics and Developmental Biology, member, editorial board
- 1981–1987, Transplantation Society, councilor
- 1977–1991, European Journal of Immunology, member, editorial board
- 1977–1983, Developmental and Comparative Immunology, member, editorial board
- 1977–1980, Current Topics in Microbiology and Immunology, member, editorial board
- 1974–1997, Immunogenetics, editor-in-chief
- 1974–1978, National Institutes of Health, member, Immunology Study Section
- 1974–1976, Transplantation, member, editorial board
- 1974–1975, Journal of Immunology, member, editorial board
- 1982, European Molecular Biology Organization, member
- American Association of Immunologists, honorary member
- Scandinavian Society of Immunology, honorary member
- French Society of Immunology, honorary member
- American Association for Advancement of Science, Fellow Member
- American Association for the Advancement of Science, Fellow
- American Association of Immunologists, honorary member
- Societas Scientarum Bohemica, honorary member

== Books ==
- Klein, J. and Klein, N. Solitude of a Humble Genius - Gregor Johann Mendel: Volume 1, Springer-Verlag Berlin Heidelberg 2013
- Klein, J. and Takahata, N. Where Do We Come From? Springer-Verlag, Heidelberg 2002
- Klein, J. and Horejsi, V. Immunology. 2nd edn. Blackwell Science, Oxford 1997.
- Blancher, A., Klein, J., and Socha, W.W. (eds.). Molecular Biology and Evolution of Blood Group and MHC antigens in Primates. Springer-Verlag, Berlin 1997.
- Klein, J. and Klein, D. (eds.) Molecular Biology of the Major Histocompatibility Complex. Springer-Verlag, Heidelberg 1991
- Klein, J. Immunology. Blackwell, Oxford 1990.
- Klein, J. Natural History of the Major Histocompatibility Complex. Wiley, New York 1986.
- Klein, J. Immunology. The Science of Self-Nonself Discrimination. Wiley, New York 1982.
- Klein, J. Biology of the Mouse Histocompatibility-2 Complex. Principles of Immunogenetics Applied to a Single System. Springer-Verlag, New York 1975.
- Klein, J., Vojtíšková, M., and Zelený, V. (eds.) Genetic Variations in Somatic Cells. Academia, Praha 1966.
- Klein, J. Molekulární základy dedicnosti (Molecular Basis of Heredity). Orbis, Praha 1964 (in Czech).
- Klein, J. The Use of Tissue Incompatibility in the Genetics of the Somatic Cell. Academia, Praha 1966 (in Czech).
