= Annual Review of Nutrition =

- Discipline: Nutrition science
- Language: English
- Edited by: Patrick J. Stover

Publication details
- History: 1981–present, 45 years old
- Publisher: Annual Reviews (US)
- Frequency: Annually
- Open access: Subscribe to Open
- Impact factor: 13.3 (2025)

Standard abbreviations
- ISO 4: Annu. Rev. Nutr.

Indexing
- CODEN: ARNTD8
- ISSN: 0199-9885 (print); 1545-4312 (web)
- OCLC no.: 928268874

Links
- Journal homepage

The Annual Review of Nutrition is a peer-reviewed scientific journal published by Annual Reviews (AR) that releases an annual volume of review articles about nutrition. It has been in publication since 1981. As of 2026, Journal Citation Reports gives the journal a 2025 impact factor of 13.3, ranking it third of 114 journals in the category "Nutrition & Dietetics". The current editor is Patrick J. Stover. As of 2023, it is being published as open access, under the Subscribe to Open model.

== History ==
Annual Reviews (AR) is a nonprofit organization whose stated mission is to synthesize knowledge "for the progress of science and the benefit of society." One of AR's titles, the Annual Review of Biochemistry, contained a chapter related to human nutrition during its first twenty-nine years of publication. However, as the breadth of subjects covered in each volume grew larger, nutrition was largely dropped from the journal. The AR board of directors decided that nutrition warranted its own journal, and the first volume of the Annual Review of Nutrition was published in 1981. It became the twenty-fourth journal title published by AR. As of 2021, it was published both in print and electronically.

== Scope and indexing ==
The Annual Review of Nutrition defines its scope as covering significant developments in the field of nutrition and its subfields such as macronutrients (proteins, fats, and carbohydrates), bioenergetics, micronutrients, metabolic regulation, nutritional genomics, clinical nutrition, nutritional anthropology, epidemiology, toxicology, and nutrition as it pertains to public health. Each volume includes a prefatory chapter written by a prominent nutrition scientist, reflecting on their careers and accomplishments. It is abstracted and indexed in Scopus, Science Citation Index Expanded, PASCAL, CINAHL, MEDLINE, EMBASE, and Academic Search, among others.

== Editorial processes ==
The Annual Review of Nutrition is helmed by the editor or the co-editors. The editor is assisted by the editorial committee, which includes associate editors, regular members, and occasionally guest editors. Guest members participate at the invitation of the editor, and serve terms of one year. All other members of the editorial committee are appointed by the AR board of directors and serve five-year terms. The editorial committee determines which topics should be included in each volume and solicits reviews from qualified authors. Unsolicited manuscripts are not accepted. Peer review of accepted manuscripts is undertaken by the editorial committee.

=== Editors of volumes ===
Dates indicate publication years in which someone was credited as a lead editor or co-editor of a journal volume. The planning process for a volume begins well before the volume appears, so appointment to the position of lead editor generally occurred prior to the first year shown here. An editor who has retired or died may be credited as a lead editor of a volume that they helped to plan, even if it is published after their retirement or death.

- William J. Darby (1981–1984)
- Robert E. Olson (1985–1994)
- Donald B. McCormick (Appointed as of July 1, 1994; credited 1995–2004)
- Robert J. Cousins (2005–2014; retired 2014; also credited 2015–2016)
- Patrick J. Stover and Barbara A. Bowman (Appointed 2015; credited 2017)
- Stover and Rudi Balling (2018–2025)
- Patrick J. Stover (2025–present)

=== Current editorial board ===
As of 2025, the editorial committee consists of two co-editors and the following members:

- Tracy G. Anthony
- Martha S. Field
- Cheryl A. M. Anderson
- Bo Angelin
- Sarah L. Booth
- Yan Chen
- Jessica Fanzo
- Vadim N. Gladyshev
- John P. Kirwan

Previous members include:

- William S. Blaner
- Cutberto Garza
- Zhaoping Li
- Mary Story
