= Elizabeth Fisher (neuroscientist) =

British geneticist

Elizabeth Fisher FRS FMedSci FRSB
- Born: Elizabeth Mary Claire Fisher
- Education: University of Oxford (BSc); Imperial College London (PhD)
- Scientific career
- Workplaces: Massachusetts Institute of Technology; Imperial College London; University College London
- Thesis: Microcloning and molecular mapping of the mouse X chromosome (1987)
- Doctoral advisors: Mary F. Lyon; Stephen Brown
- Website: iris.ucl.ac.uk/iris/browse/profile?upi=EMCFI97

Elizabeth Mary Claire Fisher FRS FMedSci FRSB is a British geneticist and Professor at University College London. Her research investigates the degeneration of motor neurons during amyotrophic lateral sclerosis and Alzheimer's disease triggered by Down syndrome.

== Education ==
Fisher studied physiological sciences at the University of Oxford where she was an undergraduate student at St Anne's College, Oxford in 1981. After completing her undergraduate studies Fisher left science and trained as a typist and worked in several different jobs in UK and Australia and in 1983 moved to Imperial College London, where she worked on mouse molecular genetics. At St Mary's Hospital, London Fisher completed microdissection on the mouse X chromosome. During her doctoral research she worked alongside Mary F. Lyon and Stephen Brown at the Medical Research Council in Harwell. She dissected individual chromosomes and cloned DNA fragments into plasmids.

== Career and research ==
After graduating from Imperial College London in 1986, Fisher moved to the United States, where she was appointed a postdoctoral fellow at Massachusetts Institute of Technology (MIT). At MIT, Fisher worked on Turner syndrome as a postdoc in the lab of David C. Page at the Whitehead Institute. Her early work looked at the male sex determining factor and then considered the genes responsible for Turner syndrome. Fisher returned to Imperial College London in 1990, when she was awarded a Royal Society University Research Fellowship to start an independent research group looking at aneuploidy. In collaboration with Victor Tybulewicz of the MRC, she was awarded Wellcome Trust research funding in 1991, which allowed her to expand her research into creating a new mouse model of Down syndrome. In 2001 Fisher was appointed Professor at University College London and in 2017 she also set up a lab at the Medical Research Council Mammalian Genetics Unit in Harwell. Her research considers motor neuron degeneration, genome editing and the development of mouse models to understand neurological disorders.

Fisher received the 2011 Faculty Member of the Year Award for Neurological Disorders on Faculty of 1000 (F1000) and an Addgene Blue Flame Award in 2017 for depositing a plasmid that has been shared more than 100 times. Fisher serves as an academic editor on the journal PLoS Genetics and on the boards for the journals Disease Models and Mechanism and Mammalian Genome. She is also on the Board of the Guarantors of Brain, a UK-based charity, and Mouse News Letter.

In 2003, work from Fisher's lab provided one of the first demonstrations in a mammalian model of the link between defects in retrograde transport and neurodegeneration. In a paper published in Science, Fisher found that two spontaneous mouse mutants generated from an ENU (N-ethyl-N-nitrosourea) screen harbored missense point mutations in the cytoplasmic dynein heavy chain gene. In cells, dynein is the motor protein that moves cargos toward the minus end of microtubules. These mutants were named Loa (Legs at odd angles) and Cra1 (Cramping 1) due to the phenotypes of body twisting and hindlimb clenching when suspended by the tail. Heterozygotes show locomotion defects with neuronal loss. Homozygotes are unable to feed and move and die within 24 hours of birth, but embryonic neurons have intracellular inclusions that are positive for ubiquitin, SOD, CDK5, and neurofilament.

Fisher and Tybulewicz have demonstrated that mouse models can be used to understand the genes that give rise to aspects of Down syndrome. Fisher and Tybulewicz were the first to successfully introduce an almost full-length human chromosome into mice – a significant technical achievement, as it had previously only been possible to introduce small fragments of chromosomes. People with Down syndrome, a condition which occurs due to trisomy of Chromosome 21, are particularly susceptible to Alzheimer's disease. The mouse models that Fisher and Tybulewicz created have allowed scientists to study the genes responsible for complex conditions. Fisher and Tybulewicz have investigated a series of proteins that are dosage sensitive in Down syndrome models including those modified by Alzheimer's disease and impacted by trisomy.

Fisher develops new models for amyotrophic lateral sclerosis (ALS) that arise from genetic mutations. ALS is a form of motor neuron disease that mainly occurs during middle age. Whilst it is well known that certain genes cause motor neuron disease, it is not clear how. Working with Medical Research Council Harwell; Fisher has described several novel mouse models including those genome engineered to have genomically humanised "ALS" genes, including FUS, SOD1, TARDBP (TDP-43), and part of C9orf72, to look at the molecular changes that occur during ALS. She has investigated how the RNA-binding protein mutant FUS behaves in mouse models. Fisher was on the Council of the Academy of Medical Sciences and is a member of the Board of the Parliamentary Office of Science and Technology.

=== Selected publications ===
- Homologous ribosomal protein genes on the human X and Y chromosomes: escape from X inactivation and possible implications for Turner syndrome
- The sex-determining region of the human Y chromosome encodes a finger protein
- Genealogies of mouse inbred strains
- Mutations in the endosomal ESCRTIII-complex subunit CHMP2B in frontotemporal dementia
- Balancing selection at the prion protein gene consistent with prehistoric kuru-like epidemics

=== Awards and honours ===
She was elected a Fellow of the Academy of Medical Sciences (FMedSci) in 2007 and a Fellow of the Royal Society of Biology (FRSB) in 2010. She was made a Faculty of 1000 member in 2010. In 2013 she was elected to Academia Net. In 2019 Fisher appeared on The Life Scientific. She was elected a Fellow of the Royal Society in 2026.
