= Mouse News Letter =

Mouse News Letter (MNL) was a bulletin of mouse genetics information published from 1949 to 1998. In 1990 Mouse News Letter changed its name to Mouse Genome which merged with the journal Mammalian Genome in 1998. Mouse News Letter now exists as a company, Mouse News Letter Ltd, which promotes the science of Genetics and provides funds to enable younger scientists to attend Genetics Conferences. “To survey the history of the Mouse News Letter is to see the history of mouse genetics unfold.” So wrote Mary F Lyon in 1997.

== Origins ==
At the Eighth International Genetics Congress in 1948 eminent geneticists Douglas Falconer, R.A.Fisher, Salome Gluecksohn-Waelsch, Hans Grüneberg and Paula Hertwig agreed that investigators working on mouse genetics and development needed a regular information bulletin. Hence, the first issue of Mouse News Letter edited by L.C.Dunn and Salome Gluecksohn-Waelsch was published in June 1949. It comprised lists of inbred strains, mutant stocks and new mutants. Toby Carter, who had been one of R.A. Fisher's students, took over as editor until 1956. The Mouse News Letter logo, a circular mouse emblem, first appeared on the cover of the third issue reaching its final form in Mouse News Letter number 4.

== Mouse News Letter as an informal bulletin ==
Although Mouse News Letter became more sophisticated over the years, many of the basic elements seen in the first issues were retained throughout. These included lists and maps of mouse genes and mutants, information on inbred strains, and brief reports of useful results that did not merit a full paper. The first gene list appeared in 1951, containing only 125 genes. The first linkage map, comprising 15 “linkage groups” with 58 loci was published in MNL in 1953. The database underlying the linkage map was maintained for many years by Margaret Green and subsequently by Muriel Davisson and Tom Roderick and colleagues. On behalf of the Committee for Standardised Genetic Nomenclature for Mice, nomenclature rules for naming mouse genes and mouse strains were published. MNL was issued twice a year and was free until 1972 when subscription fees were introduced. Lists of inbred strains appeared from very early days but between 1958 and 1984 were issued as a separate entity “Inbred Strains of Mice” every two years as a supplement. MNL was edited by Mary Lyon from 1956-1972 and then by Tony Searle until 1982.

In 1986, during Jo Peters’ time as editor, MNL became a formal publication of genetic information published by Oxford University Press. Then, for the first time, contributions could be quoted without seeking permission from the author. The Nomenclature Committee formed the Editorial Board. The number of issues per year increased from two to three with the third one being an “Inbred Strains” issue edited by Michael Festing. This replaced Inbred Strains of Mice. The journal was run by a company Mouse News Letter Ltd, limited by guarantee and with charitable status. Over the years, with the inexorable increase in genetic information, MNL also grew and the size and variety of lists and maps published increased greatly. In keeping with the then new field of recombinant DNA work, lists of restriction fragment length polymorphisms (RFLPs) and probes and clones were included. The new maps ranged from a Mouse Chromosome Atlas that showed man-mouse homologies and correspondence between the genetic and G-band maps and replaced the previous linkage map, to maps of man-mouse homologies, cancer-related genes, the Genetic Imprinting map (http://mousebook.org), the chromosome aberration map, and a probe/clone map.

== Mouse Genome and Mammalian Genome ==
In February 1990 Mouse News Letter changed its name to Mouse Genome. In addition to the lists, maps and unrefereed contributions, short refereed papers were published. Starting in 1991 Mouse Genome was published four times a year as one volume with four issues. As before, each issue had a theme and contained contributions and short papers. The first issue of the year was a “Maps” issue, the second issue was a “Genes“ issue, the third issue was “Inbred Strains” and the fourth issue was a DNA probes and Restriction fragment length polymorphism issue.

During the 1990s it became clear with the exponential increase in knowledge that the long-term future of mouse genetics information was an electronic one. In 1998 Mouse Genome, the official journal of the International Committee for Standardized Genetic Nomenclature for Mice, merged with Mammalian Genome the official journal of the International Mammalian Genome Society. The merged journal kept the name Mammalian Genome and includes the words “Incorporating Mouse Genome” on its front cover. Information contained in the lists and maps is available from the Jackson Laboratory (http://www.jax.org) and MRC Harwell (http://mousebook.org).

== Mouse News Letter since 1998 ==
Mouse News Letter continues to exist as a company Mouse News Letter Ltd, limited by guarantee and with charitable status. Its purpose is “To promote the advancement of knowledge in the science of genetics for the benefit of the public”. It receives an income from Mammalian Genome to which it sold its publishing assets. It uses this income to provide funds to enable younger scientists to attend Mouse Genetics Conferences.

== Mouse News Letter archive ==
For a complete archive of Mouse News Letter the MRC Harwell website see (https://www.har.mrc.ac.uk/about-harwell/history/)

== Editors ==
1949 LC Dunn and Salome Gluecksohn-Waelsch, 1950-1956 Toby Carter, 1956-1970 Mary Lyon, 1970-1982 Tony Searle, 1982-1997 Jo Peters, 1986 -1997 Michael Festing for the Inbred Strains issue, 1991-1997 Steve Brown for the Maps issue
