= Barbara Bowman =

Barbara Bowman may refer to:

- Barbara A. Bowman (born 1954), American nutritionist
- Barbara H. Bowman (1930–1996), American geneticist
- Barbara T. Bowman (1928–2024), American early childhood education expert
