= Rudi Balling =

German geneticist

Rudolf Balling
- Born: 17 October 1953 (age 72); Daun, Rhineland-Palatinate
- Awards: Member of Berlin-Brandenburg Academy of Sciences, Germany Member of Braunschweig Academy of Sciences Member EMBO Orde de Mérite (Commandeur), Luxembourg
- Scientific career
- Fields: Nutrition, Genetics, Developmental Biology, Systems Biology
- Workplaces: University of Bonn, Institute of Molecular Psychiatry
- Doctoral advisor: Henning M. Beier

Rudi Balling (born 17 October 1953 in Daun, Rhineland-Palatinate) is a German geneticist. He is the founding director of the Luxembourg Centre for Systems Biomedicine at the University of Luxembourg (2009-2021) He has served as president of the International Mammalian Genome Society (IMGS, 2001–2002) and as co-editor of the Annual Review of Nutrition from 2018-2025. In 2016 Balling received Luxembourg's Ordre de Mérite (Commandeur) from Prime Minister Xavier Bettel.

== Biography ==
Following his abitur (1972) at the Geschwister-Scholl Gymnasium in Daun, Germany and military service, Rudi Balling studied nutritional science at the University of Bonn, Germany from 1974 - 1981. He held a Fulbright scholarship from 1978 - 1979 at Washington State University in Pullman, Washington, USA where he studied animal nutrition. Balling received a master's degree from Washington State in 1980 and a Diploma in Human Nutrition from the University of Bonn in 1981. He was a DAAD-Scholar Laboratory of Reproductive and Developmental Toxicology at the NIEHS (NIH) in 1981–1982. Balling received his PhD (Dr. troph.) in 1984 from the Institute of Anatomy and Reproductive Biology of the Rheinisch-Westfälische Technische Hochschule Aachen (RWTH Aachen).

Balling was a Postdoctoral Fellow from 1985 - 1987 with Janet Rossant at the Samuel Lunenfeld Research Institute at the Mount Sinai Hospital in Toronto, Canada. There he researched imprinting mechanisms in developmental biology. From 1987 - 1991 he was a staff scientist in the lab of Peter Gruss at the Max Planck Institute for Biophysical Chemistry in Göttingen, Germany In 1991 Rudi Balling took his Habilitation at the University of Aachen and joined the Max Planck Institute for Immunobiology in Freiburg, Germany.

Balling was involved in clarifying morphogenetic mechanisms during development. He was able to connect overexpression of the HOXA7 gene to changes in mice vertebrae, the first occasion in which a definite function was assigned to a vertebrate developmental gene. Balling also helped to link mutation in the PAX3 paired box gene in mice with Waardenburg syndrome in humans, the gene family's first association with an inherited disorder in human.

From 1993 until 2000 he was Director of the Institute of Mammalian Genetics at the GSF-National Research Center for Environment and Health (GSF) in Munich, Germany (later renamed Helmholtz Zentrum München). As well, Balling accepted a professorship at the RWTH Aachen in 1994, followed in 1998 by a professorship and Chair of Developmental Genetics at the Technical University of Munich. His research focused on genetic predispositions for various diseases, using mice as a model for the comparative genomics of humans and mice.

Under Balling's direction, the focus of the Institute of Mammalian Genetics at GSF shifted from its original radiation- and environment-related risk assessment to genetic-related risk assessment, examining relationships between genetic influences and the effects of drugs and toxic chemicals. In addition to expanding the center's work into pharmacogenomics, toxicogenomics, developmental genetics and human genetics, Balling worked with Martin Hrabě de Angelis to develop one of the world's largest mutagenesis screens for research into gene function. The Munich ENU Mouse Mutagenesis Screen was an important part of the German Human Genome Project (DGHP), providing an approach to comparative phenotyping. Balling was one of three scientists elected to the advisory board of Germany's Human Genome Project, serving from 1996 to 2000.

From 2001 to 2009 Balling was Scientific Director of the Gesellschaft für Biotechnologische Forschung mbh (GBF, German Research Centre for Biotechnology), in Braunschweig, Germany. Under his leadership the center shifted its focus to infection research. On 18 July 2006 the GBF was renamed the Helmholtz Centre for Infection Research (HZI).

In September 2009 Rudi Balling became the founding Director of the Luxembourg Centre for Systems Biomedicine (LCSB) at the University of Luxembourg. The Center focused on "understanding the molecular and cellular mechanisms underlying the development and progression of neurodegenerative diseases". Balling will be succeeded as Director in 2022 by Michael Heneka. Since January 2022 Balling is Senior Professor at the University of Bonn, Institute of Molecular Psychiatry.

About 176 of his publications are listed in the Science Citation Index. These have been cited more than 24000 times. Rudi Balling's Hirsch-Index is 81.

== Awards ==
- Ordre de Mérite (Commandeur), Luxembourg, presented by Prime Minister Xavier Bettel (2016)
- Honorary Member der Association of American Anatomists (1999)
- Friedrich Wilhelm Preis der RWTH Aachen (1992)
- DFG-Scholarship, Mount Sinai Research Institute, Toronto, Canada (1984–1986)
- DAAD-Postgraduate Scholarship, NIEHS (NIH), N.C., United States (1981–1982)
- Fulbright Scholarship and Exchange-Scholarship of the University of Bonn and Washington State University, Pullman, Washington, United States (1978–1979)

== Membership of scientific societies ==
- First President of the Verband Biologie, Biowissenschaften und Biomedizin in Deutschland (Association for biology, bio-sciences and biomedicine in Germany, VBIO, 2007)
- First President of the Verband deutscher Biologen und biowissenschaftlicher Fachgesellschaften (Association of Bioscientific and Biomedical Societies, VBBM, 2003–2007)
- President of the Gesellschaft für Genetik (GfG, 2002–2004)
- President of the International Mammalian Genome Society (IMGS, 2001–2002)
