= Donald McCormick (disambiguation) =

Donald or Don McCormick may refer to:

- Donald McCormick (1911–1998), British journalist and historian
- Donald B. McCormick (born 1932), American biochemist and nutritionist
- Donald McCormick (footballer), English footballer
- Don McCormick (born 1945), Canadian tennis player

== See also ==
- Donald MacCormick (1939–2009), Scottish broadcast journalist
- Don McCormack (born 1955), American baseball player and coach
