= Donald B. McCormick =

American biochemist (1932–2022)

- Born: September 15, 1932; Front Royal, Virginia, U.S.
- Died: April 21, 2022 (aged 89)
- Education: Vanderbilt University
- Partner: Norma Jean née Dunn
- Children: 3
- Scientific career
- Workplaces: Cornell University; Emory University
- Doctoral advisor: Oscar Touster

Donald Bruce McCormick (September 15, 1932 – April 21, 2022) was an American biochemist who researched nutrition. His research focused on vitamins that were soluble in water and the processes of metabolism. He was recognized with a Guggenheim Fellowship and fellowship in the American Association for the Advancement of Sciences in 1966; he was editor of the Annual Review of Nutrition for ten years.

== Early life and education ==
Donald Bruce McCormick was born on September 15, 1932, in Front Royal, Virginia, to parents Elizabeth née Hord and Jesse A. McCormick. His older siblings were James, Mary, and Edward, with younger sibling William. His father was a high school teacher who taught chemistry and biology and was also involved in the production of explosives like TNT. His family later moved to Tennessee and he attended high school in Oak Ridge, Tennessee. In 1950 he won second place in the Westinghouse Science Talent Search for high school seniors. He attended Vanderbilt University, graduating with a bachelor's degree in chemistry in 1953 and a PhD under the advisorship of Oscar Touster in 1958. His doctoral thesis was about the metabolism of glucuronic acid, ribitol, and xylulose. He then completed a postdoctoral appointment with Esmond Emerson Snell at the University of California, Berkeley where he researched the metabolism of vitamin B_{6} and pyridoxal kinases.

== Career ==
McCormick's research mostly focused on water-soluble vitamins and metabolism. In 1960 he became an assistant professor at Cornell University; he was promoted in 1963 to associate professor and 1969 to professor. From 1979 to 1994 he was the chair of the department of biochemistry at Emory University. He retired from Emory in 1997, at which point he became a professor emeritus. He succeeded Robert E. Olson as the editor of the Annual Review of Nutrition in 1995, holding the position through 2004.

== Personal life and death ==
In 1955 he married Norma Jean née Dunn. They had three children. McCormick died on April 21, 2022, at the age of 89.

== Awards and honors ==
McCormick was awarded a Guggenheim Fellowship in 1966 in the molecular and cellular biology division. Also in 1966 he was elected a fellow of the American Association for the Advancement of Science. He was additionally a fellow of the American Institute of Chemists and served as president of the American Institute of Nutrition in 1991.
