= Robert J. Cousins =

American nutrition scientist

- Born: 1941 (age 84–85); New York, NY, United States
- Education: University of Vermont; University of Connecticut
- Partner: Elizabeth (née Ward) Cousins
- Children: 3
- Scientific career
- Fields: Zinc Nutrition, Metabolism and Physiology, Molecular Biology, Nutritional Biochemistry
- Workplaces: University of Wisconsin–Madison; Rutgers University; University of Florida

Robert John Cousins (born 1941) is an American nutritional biochemist who has researched the metabolism of heavy metals, especially zinc. He has served as president of the Federation of American Societies for Experimental Biology (FASEB) and the American Society for Nutrition (ASN). He was recognized with membership in the National Academy of Sciences in 2000 and served as editor of the Annual Review of Nutrition for ten years.

== Early life and education ==
Robert John Cousins was born in New York City in 1941 as the only child born to Doris E. Cousins (née Sifferlen) and C. Robert Cousins. His maternal grandparents were immigrants to the United States from Alsace. On his father's side, his heritage is predominantly Scottish, Irish, English, and German. He grew up in rural Kingston, New York.

Cousins attended the University of Vermont, graduating with a bachelor's degree in 1963 (zoology major and chemistry minor), thus becoming the first college graduate in his family. He completed a master's degree in animal science at the University of Connecticut in 1965, followed by a PhD in nutritional biochemistry at the same university in 1968 under the mentorship of Hamilton Eaton. Cousins then joined the lab of Hector DeLuca at the University of Wisconsin (Madison) in a post-doctoral position supported through an NIH Postdoctoral Fellowship to study vitamin D biochemistry.

== Academic career and appointments ==
After completing his postdoc at the University of Wisconsin, Cousins began a position as an assistant professor at Rutgers University in their animal sciences department in 1971. In 1974 he transferred to the department of nutrition. He was promoted to associate professor in 1974, full professor in 1977 and Professor II (distinguished professor) in 1979. He served as director of the Rutgers Nutritional Sciences Graduate Program, was a member of the Biochemistry Graduate Program, and was involved in governance of biological sciences.

In 1982, Cousins accepted an offer from the University of Florida (UF) Food Science and Human Nutrition Department for a newly established endowed chair, the Boston Family Professor of Nutrition. At UF, he continued researching zinc physiology and metabolism.

In the mid-1980s, the Pew National Nutrition Program held a competition to establish five nutrition centers throughout the country. Cousins spearheaded UF's successful entry in that competition, founding the Center for Nutritional Sciences at UF. He currently serves as the director. During the same period, Cousins was elected to the council of the American Institute of Nutrition (now American Society for Nutrition).

Cousins later served on the board of directors of the Federation of American Societies for Experimental Biology (FASEB). FASEB underwent a major reorganization in governance structure following the organization's Williamsburg Retreat in 1989. In 1991, Cousins was elected to serve a term as FASEB President. During that year he was involved in the Federation's focus on improving scientific integrity investigations including testifying before a United States Congress subcommittee on Proposed Regulations of the Office of Government Ethics. The following year, Cousins became chair of the newly established Public Affairs Executive Committee (PAEC) of FASEB. After his year as president, Cousins remained active in FASEB working on biomedical and life sciences research funding recommendations and the influence of lobbyists on those recommendations.

In the 1990s, Cousins was named an associate editor of the Journal of Nutrition and was elected president of the American Society for Nutritional Sciences, which later was renamed the American Society for Nutrition (ASN). Cousins served on the Institute of Medicine's Food and Nutrition Board (FNB) for two terms (1997–2002), during the period when the Dietary Reference Intakes for micronutrients were being formulated. These Dietary Reference Intake recommendations still represent the standards for nutritional guidance in the US.

Cousins served two terms as editor of the Annual Review of Nutrition (2005 to 2014).

In April 2000, Cousins was elected to the US National Academy of Sciences (NAS). He currently runs an active research lab at the University of Florida and is the Boston Family Professor of Nutrition at the University of Florida.

== Research ==
While at Rutgers, Cousins initially researched the metabolism of the heavy metal cadmium. He initiated concurrent studies with zinc, which gradually became a primary area of focus for his lab research. While at Rutgers University, preliminary work included demonstrating that cadmium from the diet was bound to metallothionein (MT), a low-molecular-weight metal-binding protein. MT levels were found to be proportional to the dietary cadmium level. Working on the hypothesis that cadmium regulated MT synthesis de novo, Cousins' research was aided by using actinomycin D to block mRNA transcription of the Mt gene. Because zinc is also a Group IIB element, Cousins initiated concurrent studies with zinc. The idea that a trace element could induce the expression of a gene, Mt in this case, was novel. Cousins developed techniques to study the synthesis of metal-binding proteins using radioisotopes and differential liquid scintillation counting (LSC). His lab also conducted some of the first studies on the role of hormones, endotoxins, and immune regulators (later called interleukins) on trace metal metabolism.

At the University of Florida, Cousins focused on zinc transporter research in the 1990s; identifying tissue specificity and physiologic stimuli as regulators of zinc transport. Heavy emphasis was placed on identifying genes that were responsive to dietary zinc intake in animals and human cells. In the late 1990s, the Cousins lab and other UF faculty colleagues developed an ELISA (enzyme-linked immunosorbent assay) for human MT, to study the influence of zinc intake on MT as a zinc biomarker. This research with human subjects extended into quantitative polymerase chain reactions, microarray profiling, microRNA screening, and proteomic signatures of zinc restriction and repletion.

Using murine transporter gene knockouts for zinc transporters, Cousins and his lab are researching zinc's silent influences on carbohydrate and lipid metabolism and physiologic stress through activity as a signaling molecule with significant phenotypic outcomes that influence health. This research is ongoing.

=== Selected publications ===
- Cousins, R. J. (1985). "Absorption, transport, and hepatic metabolism of copper and zinc: Special reference to metallothionein and ceruloplasmin". Physiological Reviews. 65 (2): 238–309. doi:10.1152/physrev.1985.65.2.238. PMID 3885271.
- Cousins, Robert J.; Liuzzi, Juan P.; Lichten, Louis A. (2006). "Mammalian Zinc Transport, Trafficking, and Signals". Journal of Biological Chemistry. 281 (34): 24085–24089. doi:10.1074/jbc.R600011200. PMID 16793761. S2CID 33581887.
- Liuzzi, Juan P.; Cousins, Robert J. (2004). "Mammalian Zinc Transporters". Annual Review of Nutrition. 24: 151–172. doi:10.1146/annurev.nutr.24.012003.132402. PMID 15189117.

== Awards and honors ==
In 1991 Cousins served as president of the Federation of American Societies for Experimental Biology. In 1996 he was the president of the American Society for Nutritional Sciences (now the American Society for Nutrition). In 2000 he was elected to the National Academy of Sciences. He was awarded the Bristol-Myers Squibb Award in 2003 in the nutrition research section.

- E. Mead Johnson Award for Research (American Society for Nutrition), 1979
- University of Florida, Eminent Scholar Chair, 1982-ongoing
- Osbourne and Mendel Award for Outstanding Basic Research (American Society for Nutrition), 1989
- National Institute of Diabetes and Digestive Diseases MERIT Award, 1992–2000
- President and board chair, Federation of American Societies for Experimental Biology, 1991–1992
- University of Florida, Gamma Sigma Delta Senior Faculty Award of Merit, 1993
- President, American Society for Nutrition, 1997–1998
- USDA Secretary's Honor Award, 2000
- National Academy of Sciences, Elected Member, 2000
- American College of Nutrition Research Award, 2003
- Bristol-Myers Squibb Award for Distinguished Achievement in Biomedical (Nutrition) Research, 2003
- Dannon Institute Mentorship Award (American Society for Nutrition), 2011
- International Society for Trace Element Research in Humans-Distinguished Scientist, 2011
- American Society for Nutrition, Elected Fellow, 2011
- University of Florida, Sigma Xi Senior Faculty Award, 2012
- American Society for Nutrition, Elected Fellow, 2011
- American Association for the Advancement of Science (AAAS), Elected Fellow, 2014

Named Lectureships

- John Lee Pratt Lecturer in Nutrition, Virginia Tech, 1980
- Burroughs-Welcome Visiting Professorship, Auburn University, 1986
- Mary S. Shorb Lecturer in Nutrition, University of Maryland, 1989
- Distinguished Speaker in Biochemistry and Molecular Biology, University of Wisconsin, Milwaukee, 1989
- James Waddell Memorial Lecturer, University of Wisconsin, Madison 1989
- Stars in Nutrition Lecturer, Pennsylvania State University, 1990
- Hans Fisher Lectureship, Rutgers University, 1995
- Lucille B. Hurley Lectureship, University of California, Davis, 1997
- Eric Underwood Lectureship, TEMA 10, Evian, France, 1999
- G. Malcolm Trout Visiting Scholar, Michigan State University, 2003
- Rank Prize Lecturer, Grasmere, UK, 2008
- W.O. Atwater (Agricultural Research Service, USDA), 2011
- Prichard Lecture in Nutritional Sciences (Inaugural), Cornell University, 2015

== Personal life ==
In 1965, while Cousins was a student at the University of Connecticut, he met Elizabeth Ward on a blind date. They married in January 1969 in Stamford, Connecticut and have three children: Sarah, Jonathan, Allison. He has an affinity for dogs, new and vintage tube audio, jazz and classical music, cooking, Lionel trains, and British sports cars.
