= Sohaila Rastan =

British geneticist

- Known for: Characterisation of the mouse Xist gene
- Scientific career
- Fields: Genetics
- Institutions: MRC Radiobiology Unit; MRC Clinical Research Centre; SmithKline Beecham; Wellcome Trust; Royal National Institute for Deaf People
- Academic advisors: Richard Gardner (embryologist); Mary F. Lyon

Sohaila Rastan is a British geneticist and former Director of Science Funding at the Wellcome Trust.

== Education ==
Rastan studied Zoology at the University of Oxford, where she was an undergraduate student at Somerville College. She then stayed in Oxford to do a PhD under the supervision of Richard Gardner and Mary Lyon at the MRC Radiobiology Unit in Harwell, developing a model of X chromosome inactivation based on counting X chromosome inactivation centres.

== Research and career ==
Rastan did postdoctoral research at the MRC Clinical Research Centre in Harrow, where she subsequently became head of the Division of Comparative Medicine and her team, including Neil Brockdorff, mapped, cloned, and characterised the mouse Xist gene, proving functionally that it is the X inactivation centre. Her team demonstrated that the Xist gene has no open reading frame, with its product consisting of mRNA transcripts.

After a period with the Benedictine order, Rastan spent four years at SmithKline Beecham, initially as director of Comparative Genetics and subsequently as group director of Biotechnology and Genetics. After leading a start-up biotechnology company, Ceros Ltd, she has served as Director of Science Funding at Wellcome and as Executive Director of Biomedical Research at the Royal National Institute for Deaf People/Action on Hearing Loss.

Rastan was elected a Fellow of the Academy of Medical Sciences in 2001 and was a Suffrage Science Awardee in 2011.
