= Barbara A. Bowman =

American nutritionist (born 1954)

Barbara Ann Brown Bowman
- Born: 1954 (age 71–72)
- Citizenship: US
- Education: Illinois Institute of Technology; University of Chicago
- Scientific career
- Workplaces: Georgia State University; Centers for Disease Control and Prevention

Barbara Ann Brown Bowman (born 1954) is an American nutritionist who spent more than twenty years of her career at the Centers for Disease Control and Prevention (CDC) in various positions. Before she retired in 2016, she was the director of the Division for Heart Disease and Stroke Prevention. Her retirement came shortly after her emails with a former Coca-Cola executive were made public, which were held as evidence that Coca-Cola tried to influence the CDC. She was co-editor of the Annual Review of Nutrition from 2015 to 2017.

== Early life and education ==
Barbara Ann Brown Bowman was born in 1954. She attended the Illinois Institute of Technology, graduating with a bachelor's degree in biology in 1974. She then attended the University of Chicago for a master's degree in clinical nutrition (1979) and PhD in human nutrition and nutritional biology (1986).

== Career ==
After graduating with her PhD, Bowman worked at Georgia State University as an associate professor of dietetics and nutrition. Bowman began working at the Centers for Disease Control and Prevention (CDC) in 1992. She held various positions within the agency, including Associate Director for Science, Interim Director of the Division of Cancer Prevention and Control, Associate Director for Policy Studies in the Division of Diabetes Translation, Chief of the Chronic Disease Nutrition Branch in the Division of Nutrition and Physical Activity, Acting Chief of the Nutritional Biochemistry Branch. She was also the CDC liaison to National Institutes of Health from 2003 to 2009. By 2016, she was the director of its Division for Heart Disease and Stroke Prevention. During this, she also contributed to national research and public health guidance on reducing dietary sodium intake and emphasizing its relationship to hypertension and cardiovascular disease. Bowman resigned from her position in 2016 shortly after correspondence between her and Alex Malaspina, former executive of Coca-Cola, became public. The communications were cited as evidence of Coca-Cola trying to lobby the CDC by building relationships with its employees. In the correspondence, Bowman advises Malaspina how to encourage the director of the World Health Organization to cease promotion of sugary drink taxes.

Along with Patrick J. Stover, Bowman was co-editor of the Annual Review of Nutrition from 2015 to 2017. She co-edited several editions of Present Knowledge in Nutrition. In 2017, Bowman also co-authored a review published in The American Journal of Cardiology, examining the potential healthcare cost savings of dietary improvements.

== Awards and honors ==
In 2012 she was awarded the International Award of Merit from Illinois Institute of Technology.

== Personal life ==
Bowman was a recreational pilot and has accrued more than one thousand hours of flight time. Barbara Bowman and her husband, Dr. James Bowman, have one daughter named Valerie Jarrett, and they are also grandparents to Laura Jarrett. Her favorite color was yellow, her favorite food was lamb roast, her favorite vacation spot was the Middle East. Barbara Bowman passed away on November 4, 2024.
