= Stephen D. M. Brown =

British geneticist

Steve Brown FRS FMedSci
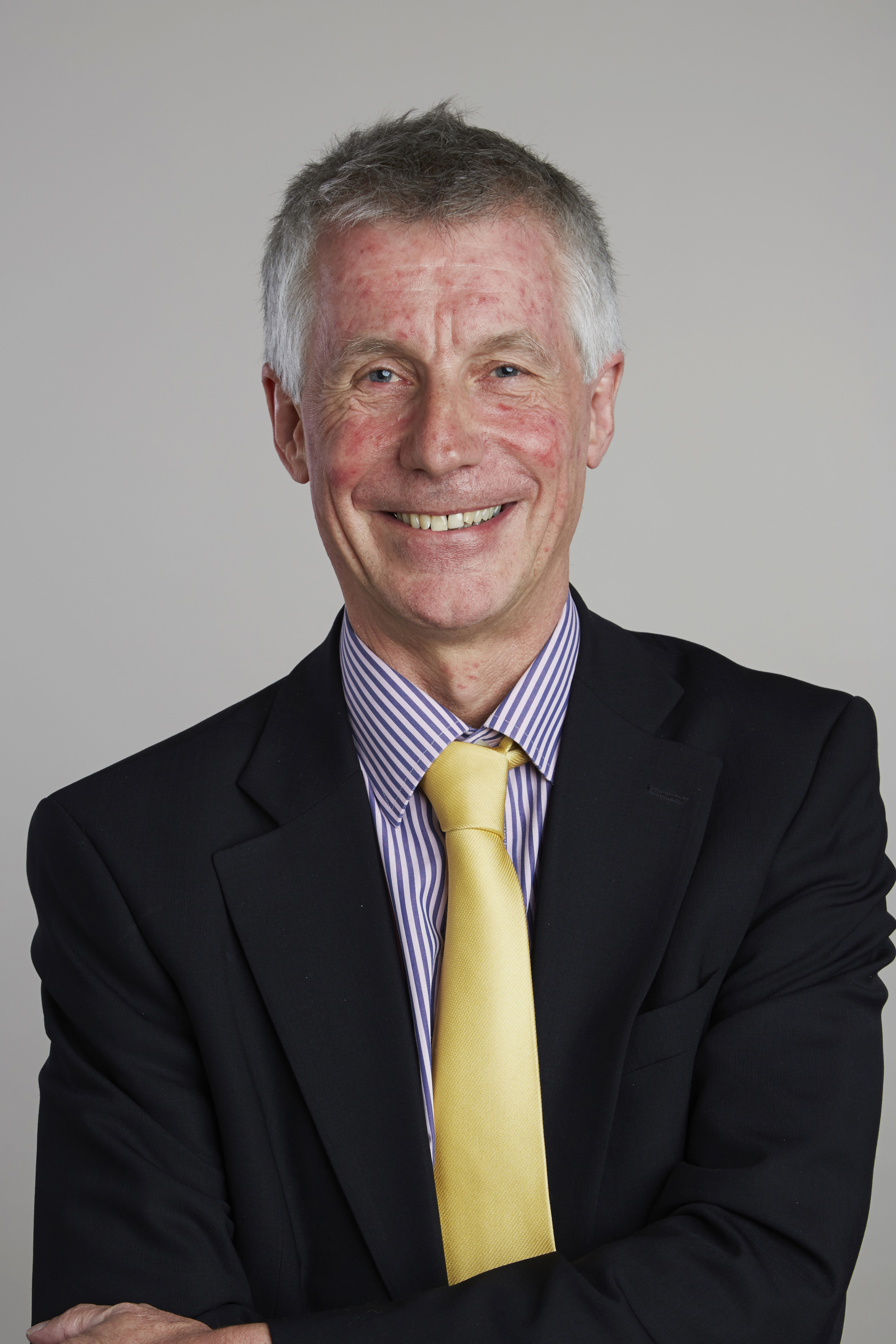
- Brown in 2015
- Born: Stephen David Macleod Brown; 3 May 1955 (age 71); Dumfries, Scotland
- Education: Belfast Royal Academy; University of Cambridge (BA, PhD)
- Scientific career
- Fields: Genetics; Genetic deafness; Functional genomics
- Workplaces: MRC Harwell; Imperial College London; St Mary's Hospital Medical School
- Thesis: The molecular organisation and evolution of rodent genomes (1981)
- Doctoral advisor: Gabriel Dover
- Doctoral students: Elizabeth Fisher
- Website: har.mrc.ac.uk/research/lifetime-studies/genetics-and-pathobiology-deafness

Steve David Macleod Brown (born 3 May 1955) is a British geneticist and director of the Medical Research Council (MRC) Mammalian Genetics Unit, MRC Harwell at Harwell Science and Innovation Campus, Oxfordshire, a research centre on mouse genetics. In addition, he leads the Genetics and Pathobiology of Deafness research group.

== Education ==
Brown was educated at Belfast Royal Academy and St Catharine's College, Cambridge, where he was awarded a Bachelor of Arts degree in 1977 followed by a PhD in 1981 for research on the molecular organisation and evolution of rodent genomes supervised by Gabriel Dover.

== Career and research ==
Brown conducts research in mouse genetics and genomics. He has studied repeated sequences in the DNA of mice and produced molecular maps of mouse chromosomes, which were used to sequence the mouse genome. He subsequently pioneered efforts to functionally annotate the mouse genome and identify and generate novel disease models through mutagenesis and phenotyping. In particular, he has identified key proteins involved in hearing, contributing to the understanding of the genetics of deafness. For example, research in Brown's laboratory has shown that a mutation in the Evi1 gene increases susceptibility to inflammation of the middle ear (otitis media) in mice, leading to hearing loss.

A particular focus has been the use of mouse models to elucidate the molecular basis of genetic deafness. With Karen Steel, he discovered myosin VIIA as the gene underlying the shaker-1 mutant – one of the first deafness genes to be identified.

Prior to being appointed director of Harwell in 1998, Brown was a professor at Imperial College London. He is chair of the International Mouse Phenotyping Consortium steering committee and joint editor-in-chief of the journal Mammalian Genome.

=== Awards and honours ===
Brown was awarded The Genetics Society Medal in 2009, elected a Fellow of the Academy of Medical Sciences in 2001, and elected a Fellow of the Royal Society (FRS) in 2015. His certificate of election reads:

Stephen Brown is distinguished for his research in mouse genetics and genomics. He pioneered studies of repeated sequences in the mouse genome and the use of novel approaches to generate molecular maps of mouse chromosomes, work that underpinned the sequencing of the mouse genome. He has been at the forefront of new approaches in mutagenesis and phenotyping for the functional annotation of the mouse genome and the identification and characterisation of disease models. Notably, in collaboration he has utilised the mouse to study the genetics of deafness, identifying key proteins involved in auditory transduction, which has transformed our understanding in this field.
