= Robert E. Olson =

American biochemist and physician

- Born: January 23, 1919; Minneapolis
- Died: August 11, 2011 (aged 92); Boston
- Education: Gustavus Adolphus College; Saint Louis University School of Medicine; Harvard Medical School
- Partner: Catherine née Silvoso
- Children: 6
- Scientific career
- Institutions: United States Navy; Harvard University; University of Pittsburgh; St. Louis University
- Doctoral advisor: Edward Adelbert Doisy

Robert Eugene Olson (January 23, 1919 – August 11, 2011) was an American biochemist and physician who researched nutrition. The recipient of a Guggenheim Fellowship, he held the editor position at both Nutrition Reviews and the Annual Review of Nutrition.

== Early life and education ==
Robert Eugene Olson was born in Minneapolis on January 23, 1919 to mother Minnie A. née Holtin, a secretary at the University of Minnesota College of Agriculture, and Ralph W. Olson, who worked at a carpet business. His family descended from Swedish farmers in Värmland and Småland, with his grandparents immigrating to the United States in the mid-19th century. He was the eldest of three sons born to his parents. While attending South High School in Minneapolis, his interests included physics and electronics, and he was an amateur radio operator.

He attended Gustavus Adolphus College in Minnesota for his bachelor's degree, graduating in 1938. He then attended Saint Louis University School of Medicine for a PhD in biochemistry under the advisorship of Edward Adelbert Doisy, graduating in 1944. Initially he researched choline deficiency in rats in the laboratory of Wendell H. Griffith. The war interrupted his studies, as Griffith was called to Europe during World War II to serve as Chief of Nutrition. Thus, Olson had to change the subject of this thesis, as Doisy believed no one else in the department was qualified to oversee the choline research. His final thesis research was on the bioassay of adrenal cortical hormones.

== Career ==
Olson was enlisted in the United States Navy during World War II, with a tour of duty from 1944 to 1946. Upon finishing his tour, he accepted a position at Harvard University as an instructor of biochemistry and nutrition. While at Harvard, he decided that he should apply to Harvard Medical School to learn more about clinical nutrition. He graduated with his Doctor of Medicine in 1951, then was hired at the University of Pittsburgh where he was chair of the department of biochemistry and nutrition. He worked at the University of Pittsburgh until 1965, at which point he returned to his alma mater St. Louis University. There, he succeeded Doisy as the chair of the biochemistry department in 1965, holding the position until 1982. From 1967 to 1977 he was the director of the Anemia and Malnutrition Center in Thailand where he researched malnutrition in children. Towards the end of his career he was on the faculty of Stony Brook University as a professor of medicine; he retired in 1990. In 1991 he joined the University of South Florida College of Medicine as a professor of pediatrics.

In 1978 he became the editor of the journal Nutrition Reviews. He succeeded William J. Darby as the editor of the Annual Review of Nutrition in 1985, remaining editor until 1994.

== Awards and honors ==
Olson was the first recipient of the McCollum Prize, awarded by the American Society of Nutrition. In 1961 he won a Guggenheim Fellowship in the molecular and cellular biology field.

== Personal life and death ==
In 1944, he became engaged to Catherine Silvoso, a nurse at a children's hospital in St. Louis. They married later that year when Olson arrived in St. Louis on break after finishing his basic training for the Navy. One of their children, a daughter born in 1947, died in infancy. Additionally, they had three other daughters and two sons. Their marriage of 62 years ended with her death in 2006. He died on August 11, 2011, in Boston at the age of 92.
