= International Mammalian Genome Society =

Nonprofit organization of mammalian geneticists

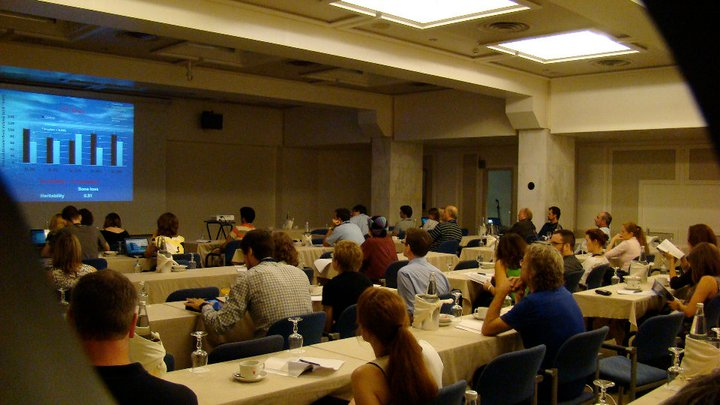
- Members of the IMGS attending a session of the 24th International Mouse Genome Conference, held near Heraklion, Crete
- Abbreviation: IMGS
- Formation: 1991; 35 years ago
- Type: Scientific society
- Purpose: To foster and stimulate research in mammalian genetics from systems genetics to functional genomics and genetic engineering, and to represent the concerns of its members in their professional activities
- Region served: Worldwide
- Members: 200+ individuals
- President: Fernando Pardo-Manuel de Villena
- Vice President: Laura Reinholdt
- Main organ: Mammalian Genome
- Website: www.imgs.org

The International Mammalian Genome Society (IMGS) is a professional scientific organization that promotes and coordinates the genetic and genomic study of mammals. It has a scientific journal, Mammalian Genome, and organizes an annual international meeting, the International Mammalian Genome Conference (IMGC).

== History and governance ==
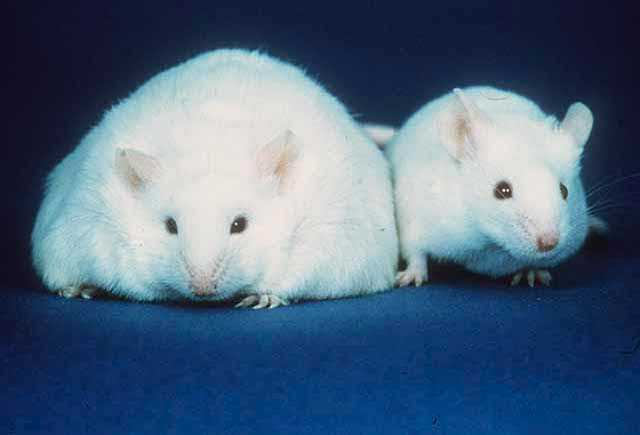
The gene affected by the obese mutation (left) was identified by Jeffrey M. Friedman, a founding member of the IMGS.

The society was formed in 1991 from informal discussions within the mouse genetics scientific community. It had 48 founding members, including Gail R. Martin, Eric Lander, Mary Lyon, Tsui Lap-chee and Shirley M. Tilghman. It has three stated goals:

- To facilitate the creation of databases of genetic information,
- Organize meetings for mammalian geneticists to share expertise and supervise the organization of genetic data (for example, into genetic maps and reference genomes), and
- To coordinate the mapping and sequencing of model organisms with similar efforts focusing on the human genome.

The society has served as an organizing body for a number of initiatives in mouse genetics. It coordinated the formation of the International Mouse Mutagenesis Consortium, an effort to assign a function to every gene in the mammalian genome, oversaw activities of chromosome committees and advised on biological database developments. Membership of the International Mammalian Genome Society is open to all people interested in mammalian genetics. Members pay yearly dues, for which they receive voting rights and access to Mammalian Genome. The society is governed by a secretariat of three presidents (vice, current and past president) and elected officers. Each officer is elected by a ballot of members for a period of two years; the presidents serve for a consecutive six-year period, two in each position. From 2009 the graduate student or post-doctoral fellow who wins the Verne Chapman Young Scientist Award at the annual meeting also joins the secretariat for the following two years. Secretariat elections are organized by a Nomination and Election Committee consisting of six active society members. The society also maintains an administrative office at the University of North Carolina at Chapel Hill.

== Publications ==
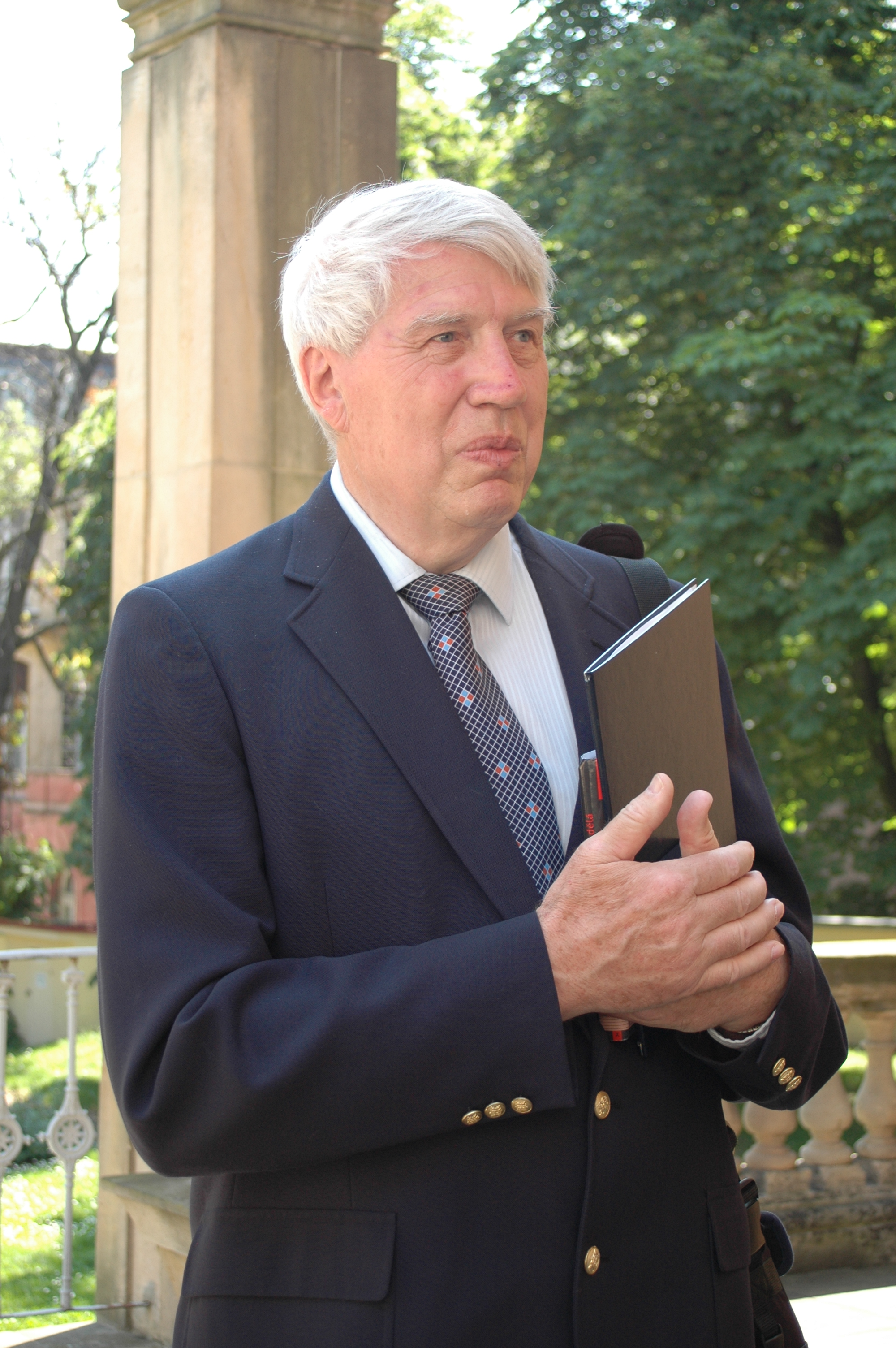
Jan Klein, a founding editor of Mammalian Genome

The IMGS has an official peer reviewed journal, Mammalian Genome, which was launched with the society in 1991 but published and managed by Springer. Three of the founding members of the society, Lee M. Silver, Jan Klein and Joseph H. Nadeau, served as the journal's first editors. Mammalian Genome currently accepts both original and review articles on "experimental, theoretical, and technical aspects of genomics and genetics in mouse, human, and other species." Any changes in editors and editorial board members are by mutual agreement of the IMGC Secretariat, Springer and the remaining editors.

== Annual meeting ==
The IMGS holds an annual meeting, the International Mouse Genome Conference (IMGC), that is attended by scientists from around the world. Prior to the formation of the society the mouse genetics community held a number of annual workshops, which the society adopted at the 4th workshop in Lunteren, Netherlands. The location for the meeting has rotated between Europe, the USA, and Japan. Recent IMGCs have hosted satellite events, including student symposia, bioinformatic workshops and mentoring breakfasts. In addition to the scientific program, the IMGC hosts the annual business meeting of the society, the annual secretariat meeting and often includes cultural or social events characteristic of host city or country.

In 1997, at the 11th Annual meeting, the IMGS inaugurated its first Verne Chapman Memorial Lecture. The annual seminar was named in honor of Verne M. Chapman, a former director of scientific affairs at Roswell Park Comprehensive Cancer Center and a founding member of the society. A number of awards are also presented at each meeting, including the Verne Chapman Young Scientist Award.

In 2018, the society established the Mary Lyon Award and memorial lecture. The award was established in honor of Mary Lyon and her role as a mentor and her remarkable career. Mary Lyon began her career at a time when very few women became scientists, and the award recognizesearly- and mid-stage independent female researchers.

From 1999 meeting, the conference program and abstracts are published online.

Year	Venue	Country	Verne Chapman Lecturer	Citation
2023	Tsukuba City	Japan	David Threadgill	
2022	Vancouver, BC	Canada	Monica Justice	
2020	Washington, DC	USA		
2019	Strasbourg	France	Rudi Balling	
2018	Rio Mar	Puerto Rico	Terry Magnuson	
2017	Heidelberg	Germany	Maja Bucan	
2016	Orlando	USA	Joe Nadeau	
2015	Yokohama	Japan	John Mattick	
2014	Bar Harbor	USA	Bruce Beutler	
2013	Salamanca	Spain	Nancy Jenkins	
2012	St. Pete Beach	USA	Eva Eicher	
2011	Washington, D.C.	USA	William Dove	
2010	Heraklion	Greece	Steve D. M. Brown	
2009	La Jolla	USA	Christopher Goodnow	
2008	Prague	Czech Republic	Philip Avner	
2007	Kyoto	Japan	Hiroaki Kitano	
2006	Charleston	USA	James Womack	
2005	Strasbourg	France	Yoshihide Hayashizaki	
2004	Seattle	USA	Richard Palmiter	
2003	Braunschweig	Germany	Kenneth Paigen	
2002	San Antonio	USA	Miriam Meisler	
2001	Edinburgh	UK	Jean-Louis Guenet	
2000	Narita	Japan	Mary F. Lyon	
1999	Philadelphia	USA	Janet Rossant	
1998	Garmisch-Partenkirchen	Germany	Oliver Smithies	
1997	St. Pete Beach	USA	Harold Varmus	
1996	Paris	France	n/a	
1995	Ann Arbor	USA	n/a	
1994	London	UK	n/a	
1993	Hamanako	Japan	n/a	
1992	Buffalo NY	USA	n/a	
1991	Lunteren	Netherlands	n/a	
1990	Annapolis	USA	n/a	
1989	Oxford	UK	n/a	
1988	Bar Harbor	USA	n/a	
1987	Paris	France	n/a	

== See also ==
- List of genetics research organizations
- Human Genome Organisation
- Genetics Society of America
