= Critical Reviews in Immunology =

- Discipline: Immunology
- Language: English
- Edited by: Subramaniam Malarkannan

Publication details
- History: 1981–present
- Publisher: Begell House
- Impact factor: 2.327 (2016)

Standard abbreviations
- ISO 4: Crit. Rev. Immunol.

Indexing
- CODEN: CCRIDE
- ISSN: 1040-8401
- LCCN: 90657708
- OCLC no.: 18553639

Links
- Journal homepage

Critical Reviews in Immunology is a bimonthly scientific journal published by Begell House covering the field of immunology. The editor-in-chief is Subramaniam Malarkannan.

== Abstracting and indexing ==
The journal is abstracted and indexed in BIOSIS Previews, Current Contents/Life Science, MEDLINE/PubMed, and the Science Citation Index. According to the Journal Citation Reports, its 2016 impact factor is 2.327, ranking it 106th out of 150 journals in the category "Immunology".

As of 2024, the Journal Impact Factor is 0.8, ranking it in the latest quartile of the category "Immunology".
