= Mary Story =

American medical researcher

- Occupation: Professor

Mary T. Story is Professor of Global Health and Community and Family Medicine, and director of Education and Training, Duke Global Health Institute at Duke University. Dr. Story is a leading scholar on child and adolescent nutrition and child obesity prevention.

She was a former Senior Associate Dean for Academic and Student Affairs and Professor in the Division of Epidemiology and Community Health in the School of Public Health at the University of Minnesota. She was also the adjunct professor in the Department of Pediatrics, School of Medicine there. She is the Director of the national program office for the Robert Wood Johnson Foundation Healthy Eating Research program. This program supports research on environmental and policy strategies to promote healthy eating for children to prevent from childhood obesity.

== Research areas ==
Story has devoted her research career studying on child and adolescent nutrition and childhood obesity. Her research primarily focuses on nutrition and diet-related issues of low-income and minority youth and their families and on environmental and behavioral community-based obesity prevention interventions for youth. She has conducted several NIH funded school and trials for community-based obesity prevention.

== Career ==
Story has published 400 articles. She is the director of the Robert Wood Johnson Foundation national program office of Healthy Eating Research and is a member of the Institute of Medicine. She was a member of the advisory committee that drew up the 2015 Dietary Guidelines, an influential set of federal recommendations that are updated every five years.

== Selected publications ==
- Laska MN, Hearst MO, Lust K, Lytle, Story M How we eat what we eat: identifying meal routines and practices most strongly associated with healthy and unhealthy dietary factors among young adults, Public Health Nutrition, doi:10.1017/S136898001400
- Larson N, Story M, Barriers to Equity in Nutritional Health for U.S. Children and Adolescents: A Review of the Literature. Current Nutrition Reports, in press.
- Larson, N, Laska MN, Story M, Neumark-Sztainer D, Sports and energy drink consumption among a population-based sample of young adults, Public Health Nutrition, in press.
- Kraak VI, Story M. Influence of food companies' brand mascots and entertainment companies' cartoon media characters on children's diet and health: a systematic review and research needs. Obesity Reviews. doi: 10.1111/obr.12237.
- Barr-Anderson DJ, Bauer KW, Hannan PJ, Story M, Neumark-Sztainer D. Perception vs Reality: Is perceived or objective proximity to environmental, physical activity opportunities more associated with recent use among adolescent girls? Women in Sport and Physical Activity Journal.
- Kristensen AH, Flottemesch TJ, Maciosek MV Jenson J, Barclay G, Ashe A, Sanchez R, Story M, Teutsch MT, Brownson R, Reducing Childhood Obesity through U.S. Federal Policy: A microsimulation Analysis. American Journal of Preventive Medicine 47(5): 604–612, 2014.
- Fulkerson J, D Neumark-Sztainer, Story M, Gurvich, Kubik M, Garwick A, Dudovitz B. The Healthy Home Offerings via the Mealtime Environment (HOME) Plus study: Design and methods Contemporary Clinical Trials. 38(1):59-68, May 2014
- 4. Bruening M, MacLehose R, Eisenberg ME, Nanney M, Story M, Neumark-Sztainer D, Associations Between Sugar-Sweetened Beverage Consumption and Fast-Food Restaurant Frequency Among Adolescents and Their Friends. Journal of Nutrition Education and Behavior. 46(4): 277–285, 2014
- Cohen D, Story M Mitigating the Health Risks of Dining Out: The Need for Standardized Portion Sizes in Restaurants. American Journal of Public Health. 104(4) 586–590, 2014.
- Chriqui J, Pickel M, Story M Influence of School Competitive Food and Beverage Policies on Obesity, Consumption, and Availability: A Systematic Review. JAMA Pediatrics;168(3):279-286, 2014.
- Larson N, DeWolfe J, Story M, Neumark-Sztainer, D.Adolescent Consumption of Sports and Energy Drinks: Linkages to Higher Physical Activity, Unhealthy Beverage Patterns, Cigarette Smoking, and Screen Media Use. Journal of Nutrition Education and Behavior.46:181-187, 2014
