= Vadim N. Gladyshev =

Medical researcher

- Born: Vadim N. Gladyshev
- Education: Moscow University (PhD)
- Scientific career
- Fields: Aging
- Workplaces: Harvard University
- Website: gladyshevlab.bwh.harvard.edu

Vadim N. Gladyshev is a professor of medicine at Brigham and Women's Hospital, Harvard Medical School, who specializes in antioxidant biology. His first faculty position was in the Department of Biochemistry at the University of Nebraska, where he was a Charles Bessey Professor and director of the Redox Biology Center. He is known for his characterization of the human selenoproteome. He is also known for his work on the effects of aging in humans. He has conducted studies on whether organisms can acquire cellular damage from their food; the role selenium plays as a micro-nutrient with significant health benefits; In 2013 he won the NIH Pioneer Award.

In 2021, he was elected member of the U. S. National Academy of Sciences.
