= Oscar Touster =

Oscar Touster (July 3, 1921 – February 27, 2015) was an American molecular biologist. He was the founder and first chair of the molecular biology department of Vanderbilt University. He served as the president of the Oak Ridge Associated Universities from 1976 to 1988 and chaired the board of directors from 1988 until 1991.

== Biography ==
Touster was born in New York City and attended the City College of New York. He received a master's degree from Oberlin College in 1942. Touster then went to work for Atlas Powder Company, only to leave after a year for a job at Abbott Laboratories, where Touster and H. E. Carter focused on penicillin research. Touster earned a Ph.D. due to his collaboration with Carter and joined the faculty of Vanderbilt in 1947. At Vanderbilt, Touster researched pentose metabolic pathways, and was awarded the Theobald Smith Award by the American Association for the Advancement of Science for his work in 1956. The next year, Touster became a Guggenheim Fellow. In 1963, Touster founded the Vanderbilt's molecular biology department. He was named a Harvie Branscomb Distinguished Professor in 1982. He retired from Vanderbilt in 2003.
