= Martin Hrabě de Angelis =

German geneticist

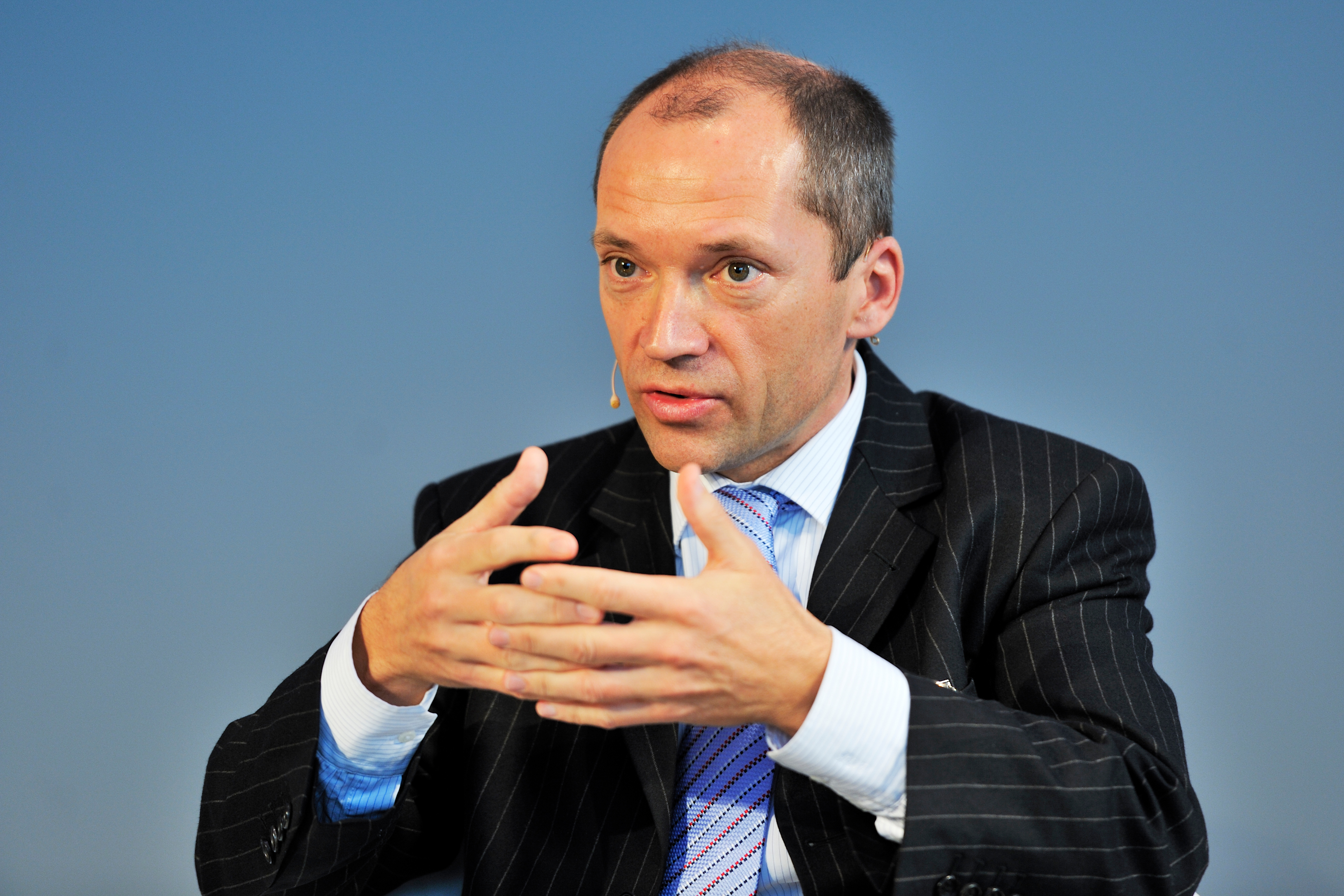
Martin Hrabě de Angelis, 2010

Martin Hrabě de Angelis is a German geneticist and director of the Institute of Experimental Genetics at Helmholtz Zentrum München and director of the European Mouse Mutant Archive (EMMA) in Monterotondo, Italy. Since 2003, he has held the Chair of Experimental Genetics at the Technical University of Munich. He is co-founder, speaker and board member of the German Center for Diabetes Research (DZD). His research focuses on metabolism and diabetes, large-scale functional genomics/genetics and epigenetics.

== Career ==
Hrabě de Angelis studied biology at Marburg University and completed his doctorate in 1994 with a dissertation on the influence of growth factors on early embryonic development (1985–1994). From 1994 to 1997, he was a postdoc at The Jackson Laboratory in Bar Harbor (US). There, he analyzed the delta/notch signaling pathway of the mouse and investigated mouse mutations as a model for somitogenesis. From 1997 to 2000, Hrabě de Angelis was head of the research group "Functional Genetics" at the Institute of Mammalian Genetics of the former Society for Radiation Research, GSF (now Helmholtz Zentrum München). Since 2000, he has been director of the Institute of Experimental Genetics at Helmholtz Zentrum München. In 2003, he was appointed to the Chair of Experimental Genetics at the Technical University of Munich. At the same time, he is director of the pan-European research consortium INFRAFRONTIER. In 2001, Hrabě de Angelis founded the German Mouse Clinic (GMC) for the systemic analysis of human diseases. The main research focus is the elucidation of genetic and epigenetic factors of diabetes mellitus. Hrabě de Angelis was co-founder of the German Center for Diabetes Research in 2009. (DZD) (https://dzd-ev.de) and is a speaker and board member. He is a past-president (president 2017–18) of the International Mammalian Genome Society.

Using a mouse model, Hrabě de Angelis has shown that dietary obesity and diabetes can be epigenetically inherited by offspring both via oocytes and sperm. By studying knockout mice, each of which lacked a precisely selected gene, he succeeded in identifying a network of genes that could play an important role in the development of metabolic diseases such as diabetes (3).

Hrabě de Angelis has published more than 500 scientific articles in peer-reviewed journals (Google Scholar Citations: 57924) as well as numerous articles in reference books. His h-index is 114 (As of January 2026).

== Academic and Professional Background ==
- 10/2023-02/2024: CFO/CTO (acting) Helmholtz Zentrum München
- 2023–2024: Chair of the German Center for Health Research Board, Forum (DZG Board and Forum)
- 2020–2023: Chair of Task Force "Fight COVID19 @ Helmholtz Munich"
- since 2020: Research Director Helmholtz Zentrum München, Neuherberg
- since 2008: Director, research consortium INFRAFRONTIER GmbH
- since 2024: Founding director of INFRAFRONTIER ERIC, Neuherberg
- since 2003: Chair, Experimental Genetics, Technical University of Munich (TUM)
- since 2000: Director, Institute of Experimental Genetics, Helmholtz Zentrum München, Neuherberg
- 2001: Founder, German Mouse Clinic (GMC), Helmholtz Zentrum München, Neuherberg
- 1997–2000: head, working group "functional genetics", Helmholtz Zentrum München, Neuherberg
- 1994–1997: Postdoctoral fellow, Jackson Laboratory, Bar Harbour, USA
- 1994: Promotion in biology, Marburg University
- 1985–1994: Degree in biology, Marburg University

== Awards and honors (selection) ==
- 2025: George D. Snell Lecture, International Mammalien Genome Society
- 2021: Paul-Langerhans-Medal, Deutsche Diabetes Gesellschaft
- 2018: Honorary doctorate from LMU Munich, Germany
- 2018: Acceptance as member in the German National Academy of Sciences Leopoldina
- 2018: Honorary Doctorate from the Technical University of Dresden, Germany
- 2016: Honorary doctorate from the University of Tübingen, Germany
- 2010: Paula und Richard von Hertwig Prize for Interdisciplinary Collaboration
- 2003: Paula und Richard von Hertwig Prize for Interdisciplinary Collaboration

== Memberships in scientific associations (selection) ==
- 2017–2019: President of the International Mammalian Genome Society
- Since 2015: Member of the Scientific Advisory Board Mary Lyon Centre at Medical Research Council (MRC) Harwell, Harwell Science and Innovation Campus, UK
- Since 2014: Member of the External Advisory Board, Karolinska Institutet – Comparative Medicine, Karolinska Institutet, Stockholm, Sweden
- Since 2014: Member of the Scientific Advisory Board, RIKEN Bioresource Research Center, Tsukuba, Japan
- Since 2009: Board Member and Spokesperson of the German Center for Diabetes Research (DZD), Office at Helmholtz Zentrum München, Neuherberg
- Since 2009: Member of the Steering Committee of the International Mouse Phenotyping Consortium (IMPC)
- 2002–2010: Member of the Scientific Advisory Board of the Mouse Genetics Program, Academia Sinica, Taipei Taiwan
- 2002–2005: Member of the Office of the International Mammalian Genome Society
- 1999–2012: Official member of the Scientific Advisory Board "Mutagenesis," Jackson Laboratory, Bar Harbor, USA

== Project Coordination, Membership in Joint Projects ==
- 2006–2010: Spokesperson of the Committee of the National Genome Research Network (NGFN), Federal Ministry of Education and Research (BMBF)
- 2001–2012: Member of the Committee of the National Genome Research Network 1 and 2 (NGFN1 and NGFN2), BMBF
- 1999–2004: Member of the Scientific Coordination Committee of the German Human Genome Project (DHGP), BMBF and German Research Foundation (DFG)
- 1997–2003: Member of the Patent Coordination Committee, DHGP, BMBF and DFG
- 1997–1998: Member of the Working Group for Licensing and Granting of Patents, DHGP, BMBF and DFG
