= William J. Darby =

American nutrition scientist (1913–2001)

- Born: November 6, 1913; North Little Rock, Arkansas, United States
- Died: June 6, 2001 (aged 87); Nashville, Tennessee
- Education: University of Arkansas; University of Michigan
- Partner: Elva Louise née Mayo
- Children: 3
- Scientific career
- Fields: Nutrition scientist
- Institutions: Vanderbilt University; University of North Carolina

William Jefferson Darby (November 6, 1913 – June 6, 2001) was an American nutrition scientist who spent the majority of his career at Vanderbilt University. He was elected to the National Academy of Sciences in 1972. He was the founding editor of the Annual Review of Nutrition.

== Early life and education ==
William Jefferson Darby was born on November 6, 1913, in Galloway, a neighborhood of North Little Rock, Arkansas. His mother was a schoolteacher. While a high school student, his chemistry teacher Ora Parks introduced him to Paul L. Day, chair of physiological chemistry at the University of Arkansas for Medical Sciences. Day later asked Parks to recommend a high school graduate who could work as an assistant in his laboratory. Darby had graduated in 1930 and was then working as a salesman at the Fuller Brush Company to earn income in the face of the Great Depression. He accepted Day's offer so that he could pursue his goal at the time of attending university and studying chemical engineering. Day encouraged Darby to enroll as a part-time student and Darby graduated from the University of Arkansas in 1936 with his bachelor's degree. One year later he received his Doctor of Medicine from the University of Arkansas for Medical Sciences. He then received a master's degree in biological chemistry in 1941 from the University of Michigan under the advisorship of Howard B. Lewis; the following year he received a PhD from the University of Michigan.

== Career ==
Following his PhD, Darby moved to Nashville, Tennessee to work at the Vanderbilt University School of Medicine as a Special Fellow in Nutrition in the International Health Division. He then had a one-year appointment as an assistant research professor of nutrition at the University of North Carolina in its school of public health. He returned to Vanderbilt University in 1944 as an assistant professor in two departments, medicine and biochemistry. He remained at Vanderbilt until his retirement in 1979, at which point he became a professor emeritus. In 1946 he was promoted to associate professor, and in 1948 he became the director of the school of medicine's division of nutrition, remaining director until 1971. In 1972 he became the chair of the biochemistry department, and carried out his directorship and chair duties while on leave to become president of the Nutrition Foundation until 1982. He was the founding editor of the Annual Review of Nutrition in 1981, remaining in the position until 1984.

== Awards and honors ==
He was elected to the National Academy of Sciences in 1972.

== Personal life and death ==
Darby met Elva Louise née Mayo while they attended high school together. They were both in the orchestra, where Darby played the clarinet and Mayo played violin. They married on June 12, 1935. They had three children together. He died at his home in Nashville on June 6, 2001, at the age of 87.
