= Patrick J. Stover =

American nutritionist (born 1964)

- Born: 1964 (age 61–62)
- Citizenship: US
- Education: Saint Joseph's University; VCU Medical Center
- Children: 4
- Scientific career
- Workplaces: VCU Medical Center; University of California, Berkeley; Cornell University; Texas A&M University; Florida State University

Patrick J. Stover (born 1964) is an American nutrition scientist who researches B vitamins. Currently a professor at Florida State University, he is a fellow of the American Association for the Advancement of Science and a member of the National Academy of Sciences. He has been co-editor of the Annual Review of Nutrition since 2015. He serves as a Deputy Editor of PNAS Nexus. He is the Co-Founder of the Institute of Connecting Nutrition and Health (ICON-Health) at Florida State University.

== Early life and education ==
Patrick J. Stover was born in 1964 to parents Katherine Hanlon and William Stover. His father, William H. Stover, was a decorated WWII veteran. As a Private First Class in the 1st Marine Division, he was awarded the Silver Star from the president of the United States “for conspicuous gallantry and intrepidity during action against enemy Japanese forces on Guadalcanal, Solomon Islands on November 3, 1942".

Stover grew up in rural Pennsylvania and he and his siblings were first generation college students. He attended Saint Joseph's University in Pennsylvania, graduating with a bachelor's degree in chemistry in 1986. He then graduated from VCU Medical Center in 1990 with a PhD in biochemistry and molecular biophysics.

== Career ==
Much of Stover's research centers on the B vitamins folate, vitamin B_{12} and riboflavin. Following the completion of his PhD, Stover had two postdoctoral appointments. The first was at VCU Medical Center from 1990 to 1991 with his PhD advisor Verne Schirch. Next, he went to the University of California, Berkeley to work with Barry Shane from 1992 to 1994. He served as Director of the Division of Nutritional Sciences at Cornell University from 2005 to 2018, a tenure of more than ten years. In 2018, he was appointed Vice Chancellor and Dean for Agriculture and Life Sciences at Texas A&M University and Director of Texas A&M AgriLife Research. As Vice Chancellor he oversaw more than 5,000 employees across the Texas A&M System’s four statewide agricultural agencies—AgriLife Research, the Texas A&M AgriLife Extension Service, the Texas A&M Forest Service, and the Texas A&M Veterinary Medical Diagnostic Laboratory—and as Dean led more than 7,800 students and 400 faculty members in 15 academic departments. The Vice Chancellor and Dean administers agency funds of approximately $468 million per year, with the College of Agriculture and Life Sciences operating on an annual budget of approximately $53 million. During his tenure he directed new investment into academic departments, including more than $850,000 in financial commitments to recruit faculty and upgrade facilities in the Department of Poultry Science. Stover established the Texas A&M Institute for Advancing Health through Agriculture (IHA) and served as its founding director. He also established the Agriculture, Food, & Nutrition Evidence Center, located in Fort Worth, Texas. He stepped down as Vice Chancellor and Dean at the end of 2021 to focus full-time on standing up the Institute and the Evidence Center. He has been co-editor of the Annual Review of Nutrition since 2015.

He has made several fundamental discoveries by identifying new pathways in the field of folate biochemistry. These discoveries include identification of the pathway for the synthesis of 5-formyltetrahydrfolate, otherwise known as lucovorin, the regulation of folate metabolism by iron, the presence of de novo thymidylate biosynthesis in mitochondria including discovery of a novel isozyme of dihydrofolate reductase, and the role of sumoylation in nuclear folate metabolism. His research group also identified impaired de novo thymidylate biosynthesis in the etiology of folic acid-responsive neural tube defects including spina bifida in mouse models. He has participated on many panels and expert committees related to folic acid fortification of the food supply and neural tube defect prevention.

Stover has provided congressional testimony on nutrition and agriculture policy. In November 2021 he testified before the U.S. Senate Committee on Agriculture, Nutrition, and Forestry at its hearing “The State of Nutrition in America 2021. In June 2023 he testified before the full U.S. House of Representatives Committee on Agriculture regarding diet-related chronic disease and federal nutrition programs.

== Awards and honors ==
He received a Presidential Early Career Award for Scientists and Engineers from President Bill Clinton in 1996. The American Association for the Advancement of Science elected him as a fellow in 2014. He served as president of the American Society for Nutrition from 2015 to 2016. In 2016 he was elected as a member of the National Academy of Sciences. In 2020 he was named a Texas A&M University Distinguished Professor, the university’s highest faculty honor. In 2023 he was selected as the W.O. Atwater Memorial Lecturer by the U.S. Department of Agriculture’s Agricultural Research Service.

== Personal life ==
He has four children.
