= Mary F. Lyon =

English geneticist (1925–2014)

Mary Lyon FRS
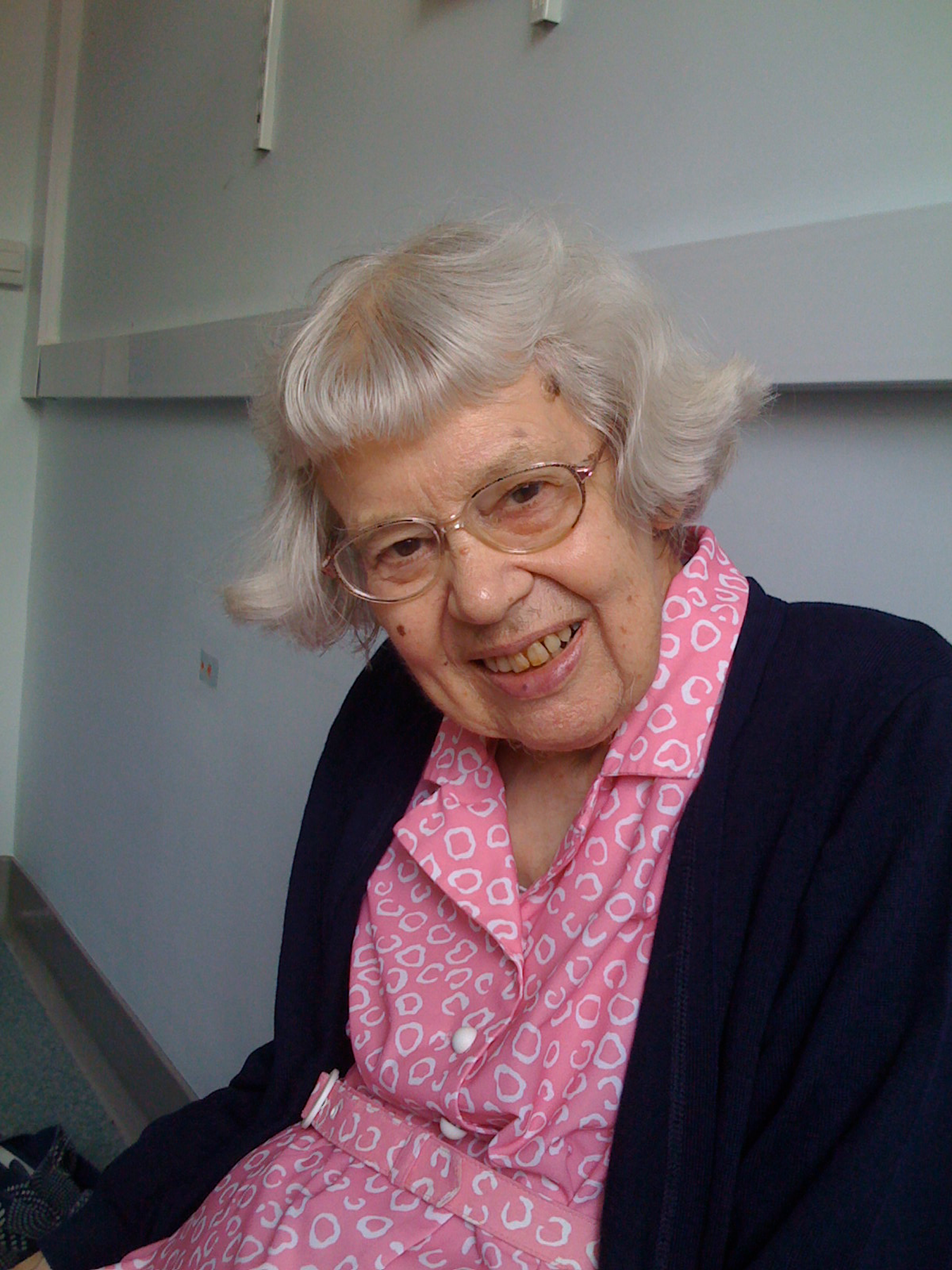
- Lyon in 2010
- Born: Mary Frances Lyon; 15 May 1925; Norwich, England
- Died: 25 December 2014 (aged 89)
- Education: University of Cambridge (BA, PhD)
- Known for: X-chromosome inactivation
- Awards: Royal Medal (1984); Doctor of Science; William Allan Award (1986); Wolf Prize in Medicine (1997)
- Scientific career
- Workplaces: University of Edinburgh
- Doctoral advisor: Ronald Fisher
- Doctoral students: Elizabeth Fisher; Sohaila Rastan

Mary Frances Lyon FRS (15 May 1925 – 25 December 2014) was an English geneticist best known for her discovery of X-chromosome inactivation, an important biological phenomenon.

== Early life and education ==
Mary Lyon was born on 15 May 1925 in Norwich, England as the eldest out of three children of a civil servant and a schoolteacher. She was educated at a grammar school in Birmingham. During that time, she said, she became interested in science thanks to a good schoolteacher and nature books she won in an essay competition. During the Second World War in 1943, she began her studies at Girton College, Cambridge at the University of Cambridge, where she read zoology, physiology, organic chemistry and biochemistry, with zoology as her main subject. At this time, only 500 (less than 10%) female students were allowed to study at the university, in contrast to more than 5,000 men. Furthermore, despite doing the same work as male students, female students received only "titular" degrees, rather than full Cambridge degrees that would make them members of the university. During her studies at Cambridge, she became interested in embryology. She went on to do her PhD with Ronald Fisher, who was Professor of Genetics in Cambridge, where she characterised a mutant mice strain with a 'pallid' mutation and published the research. During the course of her PhD she moved to the University of Edinburgh, where she completed her studies under the direction of Douglas Falconer.

== Research and career ==
After her PhD (awarded 1950), Lyon joined the group of Conrad Hal Waddington, with whom she worked in the last part of her PhD. The group was funded by the Medical Research Council, and she worked with TC Carter to investigate mutagenesis and the genetic risks of radiation. In addition to the 'pallid' mutation mice, she studied mutations such as 'ataxia' (a nervous mutation which caused walking difficulties in the mice) and 'twirler' (a mutation which induced inner ear issues, causing the mice to shake their heads and walk in circles due to lack of balance).

In 1955, her group moved to the MRC radiobiology unit in Harwell, where there was room for more mouse facilities. There she continued to investigate the mouse mutations. She also scrutinised a 'mottled' mutant, which had a different effect on male and female mice: male embryos sometimes died, and the surviving males had white coats, but females lived and were variegated. Through calculated and deliberated breeding of mutants, she investigated the transition of the mutation and concluded that the mutation was positioned on the X chromosome. This, together with new findings at that time concerning the X chromosome, led her to hypothesize about X chromosome silencing.

Lyon published many papers on radiation and chemical mutagenesis and on studies of mutant genes. She also did extensive work on the mouse t-complex.

She was head of the Genetics Section of the MRC Radiology Unit at Harwell from 1962 to 1987. Although she retired from research in 1990, according to an interview from 2010, she was still active in the laboratory a few times a week.

=== X-inactivation ===
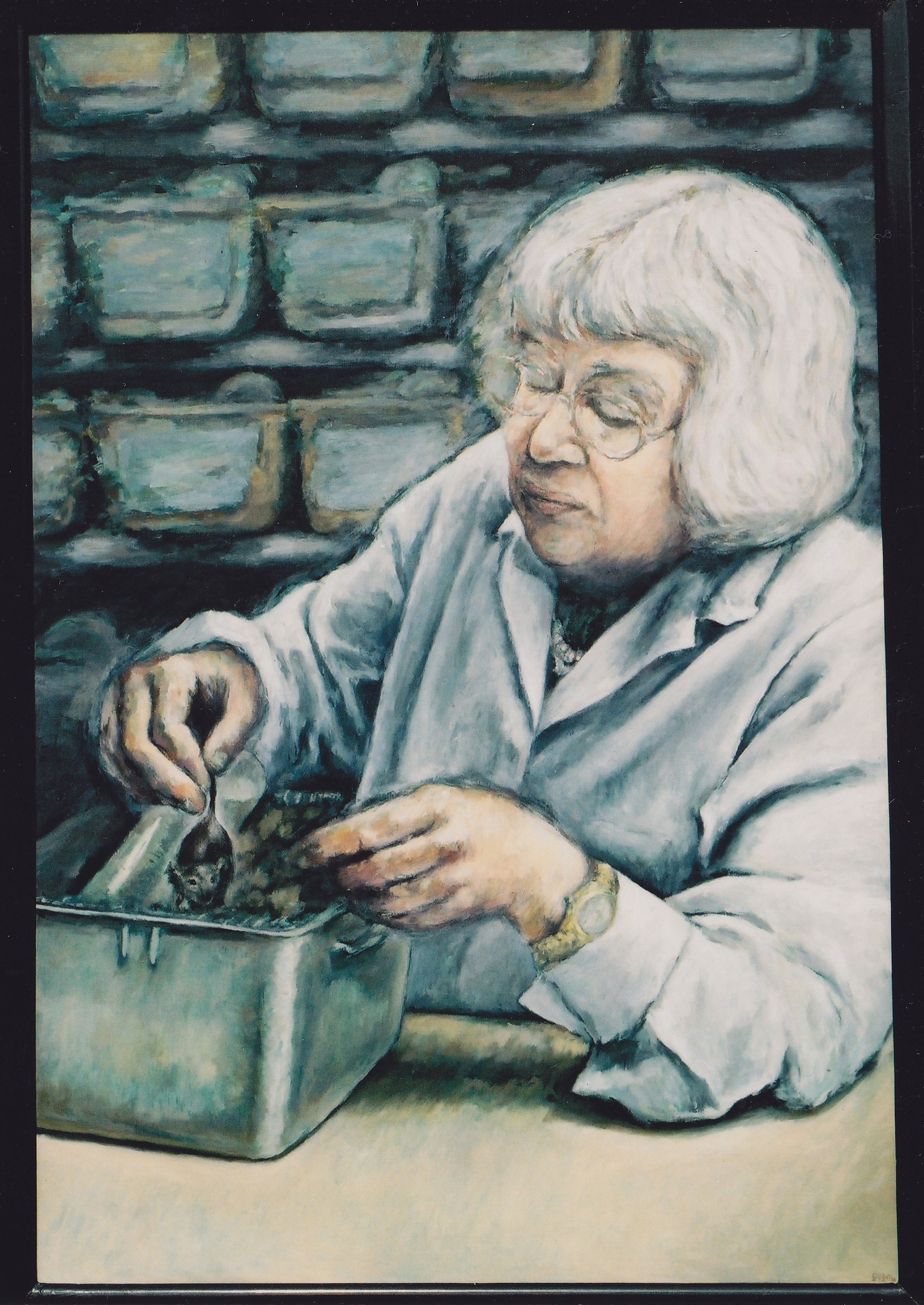
Portrait of Dr Mary Lyon in 2004 in the laboratory by Dr Lizzie Burns

It was while working on radiation hazards in 1961 that she discovered X-chromosome inactivation, for which she is best known, and the phenomenon is sometimes known as Lyonization in her honour. Her subsequent research helped elucidate the genetic control mechanisms of the X chromosome and helped explain why female 'carriers' of X-linked genetic disorders can display mild symptoms.

=== Awards and honours ===
Lyon was elected a Fellow of the Royal Society in 1973, a Foreign Associate of the US National Academy of Sciences, and a Foreign Honorary Member of the American Academy of Arts and Sciences. In 1994 she won the Mauro Baschirotto Award in Human Genetics, in 1997 the Wolf Prize for Medicine, for her hypothesis concerning the random inactivation of X-chromosomes in mammals. In 1997 she also received the Amory Prize, for genetic discoveries relating to mammalian sex chromosomes. In 2004 she was awarded the March of Dimes Prize in Developmental Biology. In 2006 she received the Pearl Meister Greengard Prize awarded by the Rockefeller University.

Since 2015 The Genetics Society has awarded the Mary Lyon Medal in her honour.

Other awards and honours include:

- In 1973 Mary Lyon was elected Fellow of the Royal Society.
- In 1979 she became Foreign Associate of the US National Academy of Sciences.
- In 1984 she won the Royal Medal of the Royal Society.
- In 1994 she won the Mauro Baschirotto Award in Human Genetics.
- In 1997 she was awarded the Wolf Prize in Medicine.
- In 1997 she also received the Amory Prize.
- In 2003 Mary was awarded the Mendel Medal by The Genetics Society.
- In 2004 she was awarded the March of Dimes Prize in Developmental Biology.
- In 2006 she received the Pearl Meister Greengard Prize.
- In 2006 she was awarded the Rosenstiel Award, jointly with Davor Solter and Azim Surani.

Her nomination for the Royal Society reads:

Distinguished for many important contributions to mammalian genetics, notably on the mutagenic effects of irradiation as measured in mice, and on the building of the hypothesis that one of the two X chromosomes of the female is inactivated at an early stage of embryogenesis. The hypothesis, which is now almost universally accepted as proved, offered a solution to the long standing problem of X-dosage compensation in the female mammal, has thrown much light on the nature of sex-chromosome aneuploidy, has influenced ideas on the origin of certain tumours and of chronic granulocytic leukaemia in man, and has provided food for thought about the fundamental mechanism of switching off genes. Lyonisation, as others were quick to call the phenomenon, has perhaps opened more lines of enquiry and stimulated more work than any recent biological concept.

=== Legacy ===
In 2004, the Mary Lyon Centre, a new purpose-built mouse facility was opened on the MRC Harwell site where she had spent most of her career. The facility was initially built to primarily support the work of the MRC Mammalian Genetics Unit. It now provides services to researchers elsewhere in the UK and internationally, as the home of the National Mouse Archive, a frozen sperm and embryo repository started by Lyon and colleagues in the 1970s, as the UK node of the European Mouse Mutant Archive, and as the central hub of the MRC National Mouse Genetics Network.

In 2018, the International Mammalian Genome Society established the Mary Lyon Award in recognition her role as a mentor and her remarkable career which began in a time period where very few women became scientists. The award is presented annually to early- and mid-stage independent female researchers.
