= Mammalian Genome =

- Discipline: Genetics
- Language: English
- Edited by: Joseph H. Nadeau; Stephen D. M. Brown

Publication details
- History: 1991–present (Mouse Genome merged with Mammalian Genome in 1998)
- Publisher: Springer-Verlag (United States)
- Frequency: Monthly
- Impact factor: 2.078 (2015)

Standard abbreviations
- ISO 4: Mamm. Genome

Indexing
- ISSN: 0938-8990 (print); 1432-1777 (web)
- OCLC no.: 39981254

Mammalian Genome is a peer-reviewed journal that publishes research and review articles in the fields of genetics and genomics in mouse, human and related organisms. As of July 2009 its editors-in-chief are Joseph H. Nadeau and Stephen D. M. Brown. Mammalian Genome has been published by Springer since the journal was launched in 1991, and is the official journal of the International Mammalian Genome Society. In 1998 the journal Mouse Genome (Mouse News Letter prior to 1990) was merged into Mammalian Genome. Authors are allowed to self-archive, and can pay extra for open access for an article.
