= Lois Salamonsen =

Reproductive endocrinologist and researcher

Lois Adrienne Salamonsen FAA is an expert in uterine and endometrium biology, currently holding the role of Adjunct Professor (Research) at Hudson Institute, Centre for Reproductive Health. Her research focuses on the mechanisms underlying endometrial remodeling, with a focus on menstruation, endometrial receptivity for implantation and endometriosis, and endometrial repair. She is a Fellow of the Australian Academy of Science.

== Education and career ==
Salamonsen studied biochemistry and received her bachelor's degree with first class honours from the University of Otago (New Zealand). At the beginning of her career in reproductive biology, she worked as a research assistant with Prof. Henry Burger and Dr. James Goding Sr. at Prince Henry's Institute of Medical Research and pioneered a radioimmunoassay for ovine Follicle-stimulating hormone (FSH) that allowed tracking of its release. She earned her Ph.D. in Reproductive Biology from Monash University in 1987. Salamonsen started her independent laboratory at Prince Henry's Institute of Medical Research, which later merged with Monash Institute of Medical Research to become the Hudson Institute of Medical Research, and was the inaugural Head of Centre for Reproductive Health from 2014 to 2016.

Salamonsen has authored more than 260 peer-reviewed papers, review articles, and book chapters focused on endometrial remodeling and implantation, accumulating over 7,000 citations. She has served as an Associate Editor for the international journals Biology of Reproduction and Reproductive Sciences, and has been a member of the Editorial Boards for Endocrinology, Reproductive Biology and Endocrinology, and Repropedia. Additionally, she has been part of the Faculty of 1000. Frontiers in Reproduction USA recognized her dedication to training and mentoring young scientists with the Beacon Award in 2014. This award acknowledged her efforts in advancing the research careers of young scholars in the field of reproductive sciences, positioning her as a nationally recognized source of insight and mentorship in the growth of research careers within reproductive sciences. Several of her former students now lead their own significant research groups.

== Awards and honours ==
- Fellow and Life Member, Society for Reproductive Biology
- President, Society for Reproductive Biology (2004-2006)
- Founders' Award, Society for Reproductive Biology (2009)
- Fellow, Society for Reproductive Biology (2011)
- Honorary Fellow, Royal Australian and New Zealand College of Obstetricians and Gynaecologists (2012)
- High Achiever in Health and Medical Research, National Health and Medical Research Council (2013)
- Fellow, Society for the Study of Reproduction (2014)
- Beacon Award from Frontiers in Reproduction Research Program (for distinguished guidance in developing young scient1sts (2014)
- Fellow, Australian Academy of Science (2017)
- Lifetime Achievement Award, Monash University Faculty of Medicine Nursing and Health Sciences (2019)
- Distinguished Fellowship, Society for the Study of Reproduction: Madison, Wisconsin, US (2021)

== Publications ==
- Poh QH, Rai A, Salamonsen LA, Greening DW. Omics insights into extracellular vesicles in embryo implantation and their therapeutic utility. Proteomics. 2023 Mar;23(6):e2200107. doi: 10.1002/pmic.202200107. Epub 2023 Jan 10. PMID: 36591946.
- Poh QH, Rai A, Pangestu M, Salamonsen LA, Greening DW. Rapid generation of functional nanovesicles from human trophectodermal cells for embryo attachment and outgrowth. Proteomics. 2024 Jun;24(11):e2300056. doi: 10.1002/pmic.202300056. Epub 2023 Sep 12. PMID: 37698557.
- Ng YH, Rome S, Jalabert A, Forterre A, Singh H, Hincks CL, et al. (2013) Endometrial Exosomes/Microvesicles in the Uterine Microenvironment: A New Paradigm for Embryo-Endometrial Cross Talk at Implantation. PLoS ONE 8(3): e58502. https://doi.org/10.1371/journal.pone.0058502
- E. Dimitriadis, C.A. White, R.L. Jones, L.A. Salamonsen, Cytokines, chemokines and growth factors in endometrium related to implantation, Human Reproduction Update, Volume 11, Issue 6, November/December 2005, Pages 613–630, https://doi.org/10.1093/humupd/dmi023
- Lois A. Salamonsen, Louise J. Lathbury, Endometrial leukocytes and menstruation, Human Reproduction Update, Volume 6, Issue 1, 1 January 2000, Pages 16–27, https://doi.org/10.1093/humupd/6.1.16
