= Lein =

Lein may refer to:

== People with that name ==
- Allen Lein (1913–2003), American endocrinologist and medical school professor
- Anatoly Lein (1931–2018), Soviet-born American chess Grandmaster
- Lars O. Lein (1874–1958), American farmer and politician
- Mahide Lein (born 1949), German LGBTQ+ activist
- Simonetta Lein (born 1983), Italian-American columnist and model

== Other ==
- Lein (Neckar), a river of Baden-Württemberg, Germany, tributary of the Neckar
- Lein (Kocher), a river of Baden-Württemberg, Germany, tributary of the Kocher
- Forbregd/Lein, two small adjoining villages in the municipality of Verdal in Trøndelag county, Norway
- Leiningen (software), the command lein is used for this packaging software

== See also ==
- Col du Lein, a high mountain pass in the Alps in Switzerland
