= Neena Schwartz =

American biology researcher (1926–2018)

- Born: December 10, 1926; Baltimore, Maryland
- Died: April 15, 2018 (aged 91)
- Education: Goucher College; Northwestern University
- Known for: Discovery of inhibin Feminism in science LGBT advocacy
- Scientific career
- Fields: Physiology, Endocrinology, Reproductive Health, Activism
- Institutions: Northwestern University
- Academic advisors: Allen Lein

Neena Betty Schwartz (December 10, 1926 – April 15, 2018) was an American endocrinologist and William Deering Professor of Endocrinology Emerita in the Department of Neurobiology at Northwestern University. She was best known for her work on female reproductive biology and the regulation of hormonal signaling pathways, particularly for the discovery of the signaling hormone inhibin. Schwartz was an active feminist advocate for women in science throughout her career; she was a founding member of the Association for Women in Science organization in 1971 and shared the founding presidency with Judith Pool. She also co-founded the Women in Endocrinology group under the auspices of the Endocrine Society, served terms as the president of the Endocrine Society and the Society for the Study of Reproduction, and was recognized for her exceptional mentorship of women scientists. In 2010, she published a memoir of her life in science, A Lab of My Own, in which she came out as lesbian.

== Early life and education ==
Schwartz was born in Baltimore, Maryland, in 1926. to a family of Russian descent who she has described as politically active. She received her bachelor's degree from Goucher College (a women's college at the time) in 1948. Despite originally being interested in English and journalism, she became interested in physiology during her undergraduate studies and spent summers conducting undergraduate research with Curt Richter at Johns Hopkins University, and separately at the Jackson Laboratory in Bar Harbor, Maine.

After graduation, Schwartz began her graduate studies at Northwestern University, where she received her Ph.D. in physiology in 1953 under the supervision of Allen Lein. She was the only female Ph.D. student in the department at the time.

== Academic career ==
In 1954 Schwartz was hired as a physiology instructor at the University of Illinois College of Medicine, which she left a year later to take a position at Michael Reese Hospital. In 1961 she returned to the University of Illinois with tenure, as the only woman in her department. She moved to her alma mater Northwestern University in 1973, becoming the chair of the biology department of the medical school a year later and serving for four years. In 1974, Schwartz organized the founding of the Program for Reproductive Research at Northwestern, which would evolve into the Center for Reproductive Science in 1987 with Schwartz as its director.

Schwartz was among the very few women who served in the 1960s on American Physiological Society program committees, was the first woman president of the Society for the Study of Reproduction from 1977 to 1978, and was the second woman president of the Endocrine Society from 1982 to 1983. Schwartz retired from her academic positions in 1999.

== Research ==
Schwartz's research group studied the feedback mechanisms that govern hormonal signaling pathways in the female reproductive cycle, using rats as an animal model. Her work played a major role in the developing the modern understanding of the hypothalamic–pituitary–adrenal axis in endocrinology and was particularly significant in discovering the hormone inhibin.

While investigating the secretion of gonadotropins by the pituitary, Schwartz and her research group observed that then-dominant models of the reproductive cycle did not explain the observed changes in levels of luteinizing hormone and follicle-stimulating hormone in response to gonadotropin-releasing hormone. A hypothetical additional hormone given the name inhibin had been suggested years prior based on work with male animals, potentially being secreted from the testes. Schwartz's key insight was to instead investigate secretion from the ovaries in female subjects. The existence of inhibin in ovarian follicular fluid was confirmed by the Schwartz group in collaboration with Cornelia Channing in the mid-1970s. Inhibin – which plays a role in both male and female hormonal signaling – was molecularly characterized in the mid-1980s as a protein dimer. Inhibin levels have since been identified as one of several biomarkers that can be used to screen for Down syndrome in the fetus by testing a woman's blood.

== Awards and honors ==
Schwartz received the Williams Distinguished Service Award from the Endocrine Society in 1985 and the Carl Hartman Research Award from the Society for the Study of Reproduction in 1992.

Schwartz was elected a fellow of the American Association for the Advancement of Science in 1986 and of the American Academy of Arts and Sciences in 1992. She served on the board of the American Association for the Advancement of Science from 2000 to 2002 and received their Mentor Award for Lifetime Achievement in 2002.

Neena has also received the following honors: Northwestern Alumni Excellence in Teaching Award, Women in Endocrinology Mentor of the Year Award, Distinguished Educator Award from the endocrine Society, Northwestern School of Medicine alumni Merit Award, and Pioneer in Reproductive Research Award. Page text.

== Activism ==
In the 1970s Schwartz became involved in the feminist movement. She was a founding member of the Association for Women in Science (AWIS) – which she recalled originating after drinks at a Federation of American Societies for Experimental Biology meeting with other women scientists frustrated with their situation. She served as founding co-president of AWIS along with Judith Pool, taking a primarily executive role while Pool worked in fundraising. Notable early achievements of AWIS, along with other women in science organizations, include initiating a class action lawsuit against the National Institutes of Health for poor representation of women on NIH grant review committees. The lawsuit was dropped after Robert Marston, then head of the NIH, met with representatives of the groups, including Schwartz, and committed to appointing more women.

In the 1970s Schwartz co-founded the Women in Endocrinology society within the Endocrine Society after discovering a lack of women's representation on the society's key organizing committees. She later served as the group's president from 1990 to 1992.

Schwartz was one of forty women in non-traditional professions interviewed by filmmaker and artist Michelle Citron for her 1983 film What You Take for Granted.

As a 20th-century female scientist, Schwartz faced micro aggressions and macro aggressions. She wrote her 2010 memoir, A Lab of My Own. to detail her experience as a female scientist to lend visibility to her experiences. At her first job at the University of Illinois, the chairman of the department asked her to pour the tea. She details her experiences like this, her successes and struggles all in the hopes of providing lessons and possibilities for a new generation of scientists and world citizens.

== Personal life and LGBTQ+ experience ==
Schwartz identified as lesbian. She discovered her sexuality as a teenager in the 1940s, but kept her sexuality private during her scientific career and publicly came out in her 2010 memoir, A Lab of My Own. She began writing the book "because no one had documented the feminist movement in science" and concluded as she wrote that revealing her sexuality was necessary to telling the story. She hopes that the book will "provide young gay scientists or other professionals with a lesson of possibilities for success and happiness without such splits in their lives.". She lived in Evanston Illinois with her life partner of over 20 years Harriet Wadeson.
