= Harry Shamoon =

Harry Shamoon is professor emeritus of endocrinology, diabetes and metabolism at the Albert Einstein College of Medicine and Montefiore Medical Center.

== Education ==
Shamoon obtained B.A. with Magna cum laude from the Columbia College in 1970 and four years later got an M.D. from the Yale School of Medicine. Following graduation, he became an intern and resident at the Jacobi Medical Center and from 1977 to 1979 worked at the Robert S. Sherwin's laboratory of Yale School of Medicine.

== Career ==
Following postdoctoral training, Shamoon was an instructor at the Albert Einstein College of Medicine, where he was later promoted to the Assistant and associate professor in 1980 and 1985 respectively. In 1990, he became a professor of medicine at Albert Einstein College of Medicine and seven years later became its Program Director. In 1999 and 2005 respectively, he was promoted to the position of Associate Dean for Clinical and Translational Research.

In 1992 he became an Elected Member of the American Society for Clinical Investigation.

From 1996 to 1999 Shamoon served on the Board of Directors of the American Diabetes Association.

Shamoon serves on the JDRF International Medical Science Review Committee and the Scientific and Medical Advisory Group of the American Diabetes Association. Dr. Shamoon is a member of the Association of American Physicians, the American Federation for Medical Research, Federation of American Societies for Experimental Biology, the American Association for the Advancement of Science, Endocrine Society, the American College of Physicians, the American Physiological Society, and the New York Academy of Medicine.
