= Wadeson =

Wadeson is an English surname. Notable people with the surname include:

- Harriet Wadeson (1931–2016), American psychotherapist, author, researcher, and educator
- Richard Wadeson (1826–1885), British soldier
