= Monash Medical Centre =

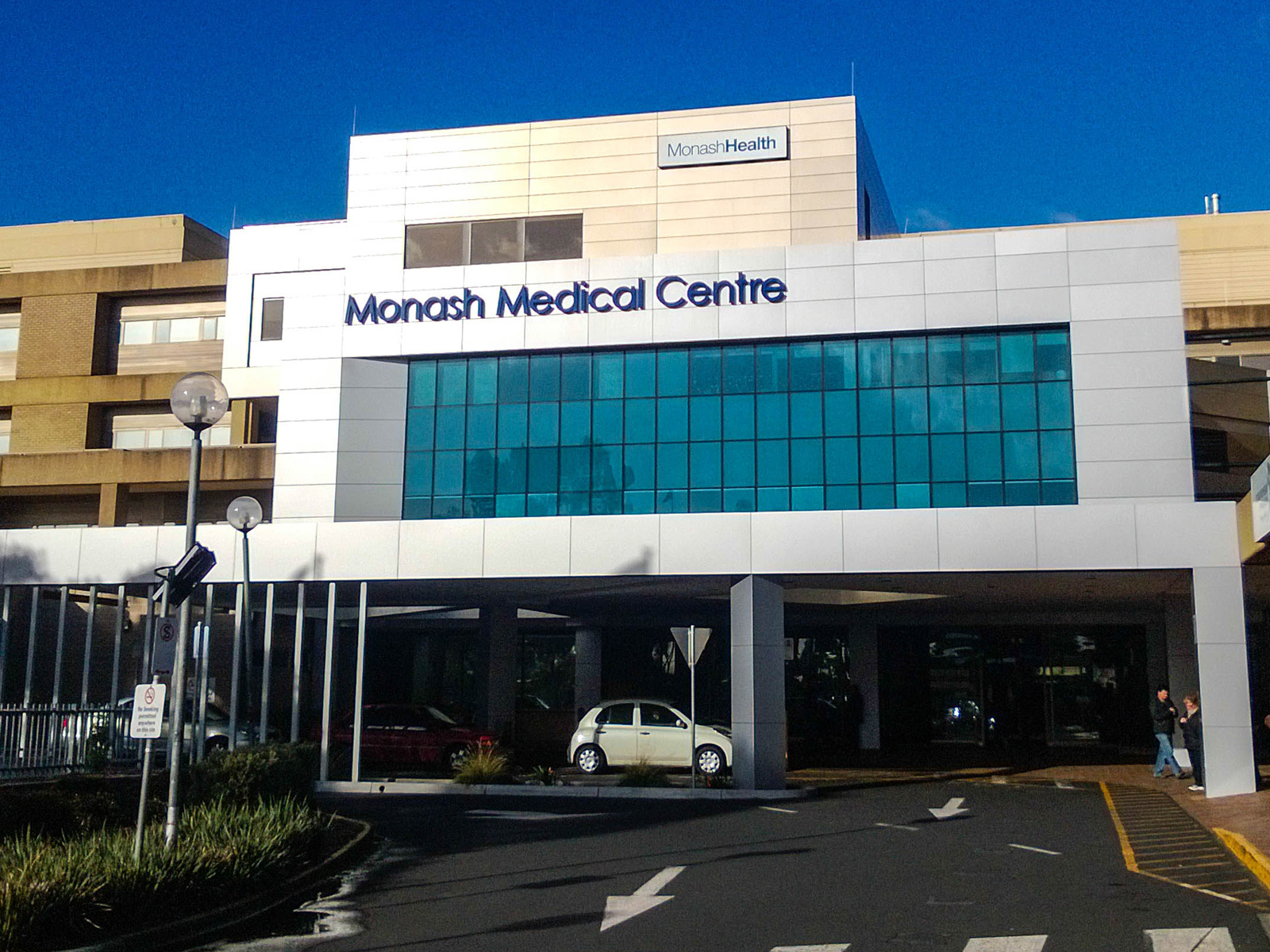
- The main entrance to Monash Medical Centre

Geography
- Location: Melbourne, Victoria, Australia
- Coordinates: 37°55′10″S 145°07′17″E

Organisation
- Care system: Public Medicare (AU)
- Type: Teaching
- Affiliated university: Monash University

Services
- Emergency department: Yes
- Beds: 640

History
- Founded: 1987

Links
- Website: monashhealth.org/contact/monash-medical-centre
- Lists: Hospitals in Australia

Monash Medical Centre (MMC) is a teaching hospital in Melbourne, Australia. It provides specialist tertiary-level healthcare to Melbourne's south-east.

Monash Medical Centre is part of Monash Health, the largest public health service in Victoria.

== History ==
Monash Medical Centre was formed in 1987 with the amalgamation of the Queen Victoria Medical Centre (an obstetric and gynaecological hospital in central Melbourne), Prince Henry's Hospital (a general hospital in South Melbourne) and the Moorabbin Hospital (a general hospital in Moorabbin). It was built on the site of McCulloch House, a nursing home.

== Services ==
=== Cardiology ===
MonashHeart provides cardiology related services and cardiac care at the Monash Medical Centre, Clayton, and at Dandenong Hospital. MonashHeart is the busiest interventional cardiology service in the state, providing coronary angiography and coronary angioplasty services to the entire south eastern area of the state. MonashHeart is the largest non-invasive imaging service in Victoria, performing nearly 14,000 echocardiograms each year for newborns through to adults.

Acute cardiac inpatient services are provided across the network. There is a 21-bed cardiac care unit at Monash Medical Centre, Clayton, which manages a high case load of ST-elevation acute myocardial infarctions, with a daily case load of 3–4 cases not being unusual; A 12-bed cardiac care unit at Dandenong Hospital, which shares the coronary angiography and angioplasty services with Monash Medical Centre, Clayton; A 24-bed combined cardiology and cardiothoracic unit, Monash Medical Centre, Clayton which manages all the post op cardiothoracic cases, as well as other general cardiology cases.

MonashHeart became a luminary site for the 320-slice Toshiba Aquilion One CT scanner in September 2008, the first health service to do so in the southern hemisphere.

There have been numerous other medical firsts achieved by MonashHeart:

- first robotic heart operation in the southern hemisphere
- first Arctic Front case in Australia
- first WATCHMAN case in Australia
- first Australian centre approved for independent percutaneous valve replacement

=== Kidney and pancreatic transplant ===
Monash Medical Centre is designated a national provider of kidney and pancreatic transplants. This is a legacy of the endocrinology service provided at the former Prince Henry's Hospital, which transferred its services to Monash Medical Centre, Clayton in 1987. It is currently the second largest kidney transplant unit in Melbourne in terms of numbers, after the Royal Melbourne Hospital. In 2011, there were a record number of kidney transplants performed at the Monash Medical Centre, with 92 recorded. The renal ward at Monash Medical Centre has 18 beds and accommodates acutely ill patients with all kidney conditions, including pre- and post- kidney and pancreas transplant patients, (including donors), and vascular access surgery.

=== Emergency ===
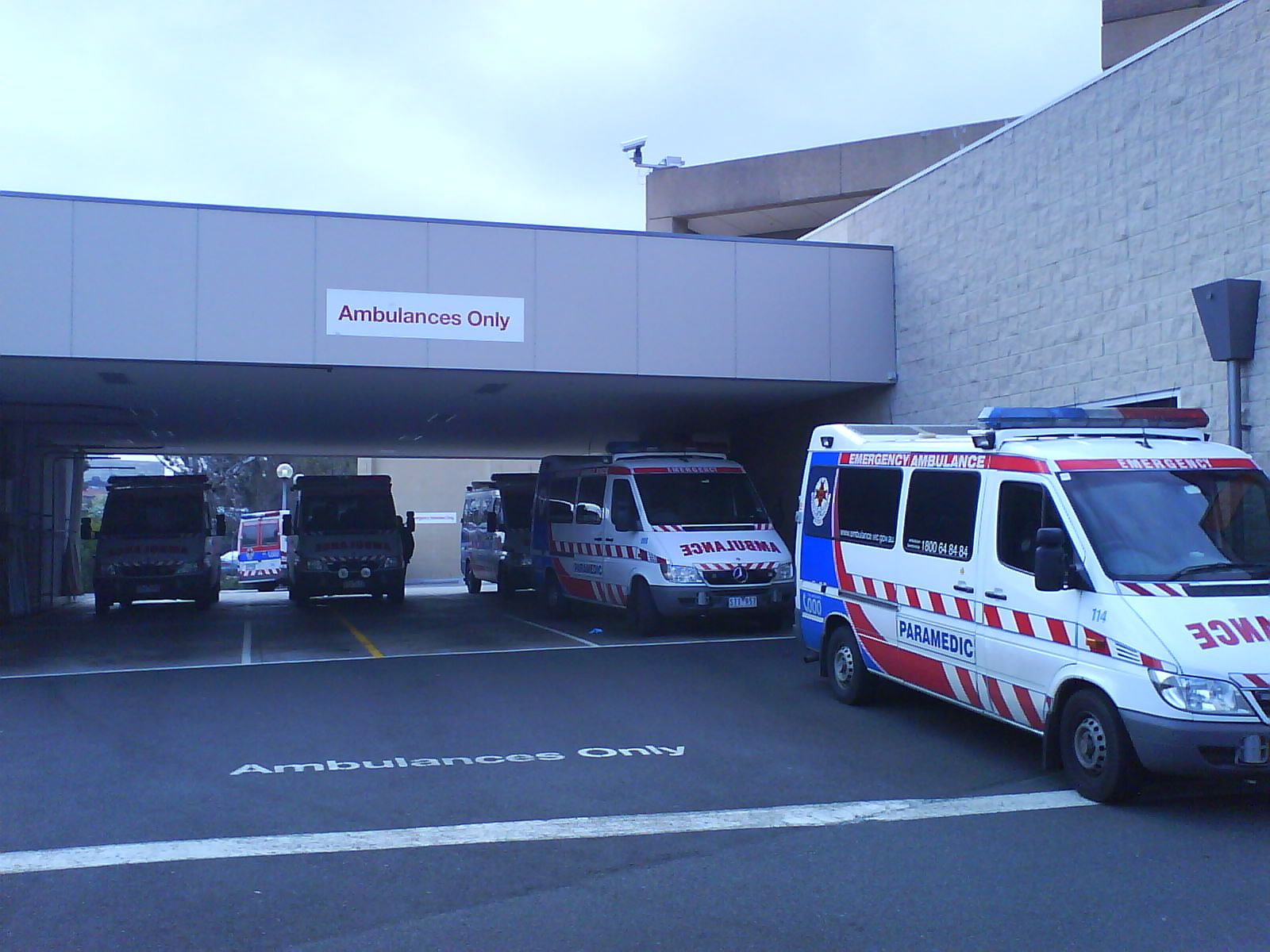
Ambulances outside ED at MMC

As of 2012, the Emergency Department at Monash Medical Centre Clayton was Victoria's busiest Emergency Department, with 69,951 presentations between July 2011 and June 2012.

=== Thalassemia ===
It is the statewide provider of Thalassemia services, for both children and adult populations. Most of the services are provided on an outpatient basis with the clinics located on the 2nd floor of the hospital, next to the allied health offices.

=== Infectious diseases ===
Due to its large refugee population in its catchment area, Monash Medical Centre, Clayton provides specialist care for a large number of patients with tuberculosis and non-tuberculous mycobacterial infections. There is a weekly TB clinic that is run every Wednesday, as well as an inpatient service that cares for patients who need to be isolated and treated as an inpatient. The hospital provide specialist care for many patients with tuberculosis, and nontuberculous mycobacterial infections, including infections due to Mycobacterium avium complex, Mycobacterium leprae and Mycobacterium ulcerans. Along with the Western Hospital, which hosts the migrant screening clinic, Monash Medical Centre, Clayton arguably cares for the highest number of inpatient TB patients in the state.

=== Mental health ===
The mental health program of Monash Health is one of the largest mental health services in Victoria, providing comprehensive mental health services for all age groups for the people living in the south eastern region of Melbourne. Mental health program works in close collaboration with Monash University School of Psychiatry, Psychology and Psychological Medicine.

The mental health program is the largest post graduate training for RANZCP training program in Melbourne. The program employs 45 Consultant psychiatrists and 35 psychiatry trainees. There is an extensive teaching program for all levels of trainees.

==== Gender dysphoria service ====
The Monash gender dysphoria service is largest government-funded gender dysphoria health service clinic in Australia.

In 2016, the Andrews government allocated $6.4 million to this Monash gender dysphoria program, which now has 250 referrals per annum.

=== Intensive care ===
As a large tertiary referral hospital it provides neurosurgery, nephrology, cardiothoracic surgery, and houses intensive care units treating neonatal, paediatric and adult patients.

It has a 26-bed Intensive Care Unit (mixed between adults and children), an even larger Neonatal Intensive Care Unit, and 16 peripheral High Dependency Unit beds throughout the hospital. The Intensive Care Unit specialises in both post-cardiac surgery and post-neurosurgical care, as well as severe sepsis and acute medical illness management. It also has a high number of patients with chronic kidney failure related illness.

=== Research and training ===
The hospital is highly involved with advanced medical training, including accredited training programs for all medical specialties and boasts excellent pass rates across all speciality training programs. Eight departments of Monash University are based at Monash Medical Centre.

Monash Medical Centre will stand alongside the planned Monash Health Translational Precinct, a partnership between Monash Health, Monash University, and Hudson Institute of Medical Research.

== See also ==
- List of hospitals in Australia
- Healthcare in Australia
