= Monash University Faculty of Medicine, Nursing and Health Sciences =

Medical school in Melbourne, Victoria, Australia

The Monash University Faculty of Medicine, Nursing and Health Sciences is an Australian healthcare provider. It comprises 10 schools, teaching and clinical centers and research institutes. The faculty offers undergraduate, postgraduate and professional education programs in medicine, nursing and allied health, and is a member of the M8 Alliance of Academic Health Centers, Universities and National Academies.

The faculty's current dean is Christina Mitchell.

== Campuses ==
=== Australia ===
The faculty primarily operates from Monash University's Clayton, Caulfield and Peninsula campuses, all based in metropolitan Melbourne. Of these, Monash Clayton is home to the majority of the faculty's schools, research centers and technology platforms.

The Peninsula campus is located close to Frankston Hospital. Courses taught at this campus include nursing and midwifery, emergency health and paramedic practice, physiotherapy and occupational therapy. In 2016, the university committed $20 million to developing the campus.

The graduate-entry Bachelor of Medical Science and Doctor of Medicine (MD) program is the only course still offered at Churchill, following the transfer of the Monash Gippsland campus to Federation University Australia in 2014.

Researchers, clinicians and students are also based at off-campus locations such as The Alfred Hospital, Monash Medical Centre and Box Hill Hospital.

=== International ===
Monash Malaysia is home to the Jeffrey Cheah School of Medicine and Health Sciences, which offers undergraduate courses in medicine and psychology. The medical course is the only program outside of Australia to be accredited by the Australian Medical Council. This campus is also home to the Brains Research Institute at Monash Sunway (BRIMS) and the Southeast Community Observatory (SEACO).

At Monash South Africa, the School of Health Sciences teaches undergraduate programs in public health and social science. It is one of the only institutions in Africa to offer a degree in public health.

== Schools ==
The Faculty of Medicine, Nursing and Health Sciences is made up of ten schools.

- Eastern Health Clinical School
- Monash School of Medicine
- School of Biomedical Sciences
- School of Clinical Sciences at Monash Health
- School of Nursing and Midwifery
- School of Psychological Sciences
- School of Primary and Allied Health Care
- School of Public Health and Preventive Medicine
- School of Rural Health
- School of Translational Medicine

== Research ==
The Faculty of Medicine, Nursing and Health Sciences is Monash's largest research faculty, with a research income of over $380 million in 2022. Research from the faculty has been published in Nature Publishing Group, The Lancet and The New England Journal of Medicine.

The faculty's research is categorized into nine thematic areas:

- Cancer and blood diseases
- Cardiovascular disease
- Critical care, trauma and perioperative medicine
- Development, stem cells and regenerative medicine
- Infection, inflammation and immunity
- Metabolism, obesity and men's health
- Neurosciences and mental health
- Public health and health systems improvement
- Women's, children's and reproductive health

=== Research centers and institutes ===
The Faculty of Medicine, Nursing and Health Sciences incorporates three research institutes:

- Australian Regenerative Medicine Institute (ARMI)
- Monash Biomedicine Discovery Institute (BDI)
- Monash Institute of Cognitive and Clinical Neurosciences (MICCN)

Research centers within or jointly established by the faculty include:

- Andrology Australia
- Australia New Zealand Intensive Care Research Centre (ANZIC-RC)
- Australian Centre for Blood Diseases
- Australian Centre for Human Health Risk Assessment
- Australian Cochrane Centre ACC
- Brain Research Institute at Monash Sunway (BRIMS)
- Centre for Developmental Psychiatry and Psychology
- Centre for Inflammatory Diseases (CID)
- Centre for Obesity Research and Education (CORE)
- Centre of Cardiovascular Research and Education in Therapeutics (CCRET)
- Centre for Research Excellence in Patient Safety (CRE-PS)
- Hudson Institute of Medical Research
- Michael Kirby Centre for Public Health and Human Rights
- Monash Ageing Research Centre (MONARC)
- Monash Alfred Psychiatry Research Centre (MAPrc)
- Monash Cardiovascular Research Centre (MCRC)
- Monash Centre for Occupational and Environmental Health (MonCOEH)
- Monash Centre for the Study of Ethics in Medicine and Society (CEMS)
- Monash Institute of Medical Engineering (MIME)
- Problem Gambling Research and Treatment Centre (PGRTC)
- The Ritchie Centre
- Southern Synergy

The faculty also participates in the Monash Partners Academic Health Science Centre, 1 of 4 advanced health research and translation centres in Australia. Monash Partners comprises:

- Alfred Health
- Baker IDI Heart and Diabetes Institute
- Burnet Institute
- Cabrini Health
- Epworth HealthCare
- Hudson Institute of Medical Research
- Monash Health
- Monash University

=== Translational research ===
Monash's Faculty of Medicine, Nursing and Health Science has demonstrated a commitment to translational research and offers a PhD and Graduate Certificate in Translational Research.

In 2016, Monash University partnered with the Hudson Institute of Medical Research and Monash Health to open a new translational research facility at the Monash Health Translation Precinct (MHTP), which co-locates scientists, researchers, clinicians and patients in a collaborative environment.

== Teaching and learning ==
The Faculty of Medicine, Nursing and Health Sciences is one of the largest providers of education for doctors, nurses and allied health professionals in Australia. Courses are offered across all areas of health and most incorporate clinical placement.

=== Undergraduate ===
The faculty offers bachelor-level degrees in:

- Biomedical science
- Health sciences (emergency health and paramedic practice, human services, public health and radiation sciences)
- Medicine
- Nursing
- Nutrition science
- Occupational therapy
- Physiotherapy
- Psychology
- Radiography and medical imaging

The faculty also offers several one-year honors level research degrees.

As of 2017 the Bachelor of Medicine and Bachelor of Surgery (Honors) MBBS program has been replaced with a Bachelor of Medical Science and Doctor of Medicine (MD).

=== Postgraduate ===
Graduate courses (by coursework and research) are available across areas including:

- Addictive behaviors
- Dietetics
- Forensic medicine
- Medical ultrasound
- Public health
- Reproductive Sciences
- Social work

The faculty also offers higher research degrees with research masters, doctoral courses (PhD) and professional doctorates. In 2017, over 1300 students completed higher degrees by research within the faculty.

=== Professional education ===
The Monash Institute for Health and Clinical Education launched in 2016 to offer short courses and workshops for healthcare professionals.

== Education programs ==
The university conducts parent education programs such as The Early Journey of Life, focused on the first 1000 days of a child's life (from pregnancy to 2-year-old). The intervention is conducted by the RTCCD Vietnam and Monash University in rural Ha Nam province of Vietnam by addressing maternal physical and mental health and child health and development through a combination of learning activities and social support.

== Rankings ==
- 34 for Clinical Medicine and Pharmacy, Academic Ranking of World Universities (ARWU), 2016
- 41 for Clinical, Preclinical and Health Sciences, Times Higher Education World University Rankings, 2016-2017
- 14 for Nursing, QS World University Rankings, 2020
- 31 for Medicine, QS World University Rankings, 2020

== Student life ==
=== Clubs and societies ===
Monash University Medical Undergraduates’ Society (MUMUS) represents all medical students across the Monash Clayton and Churchill campuses.

Wildfire is the university's rural and indigenous health club.

The Monash Medical Orchestra (MMO) is a musical ensemble of medical students and other students from the Faculty of Medicine, Nursing and Health Sciences, founded by MBBS student Tim Martin in 2011.

== Alumni ==
As of 2017, the Faculty of Medicine, Nursing and Health Sciences has an alumni network of over 41,000 alumni across 90 countries. Counting Rhodes and Fulbright scholars and Australian of the Year recipients among their graduates, notable Faculty alumni include:

- David de Kretser – medical researcher and former Governor of Victoria
- Julian Savulescu - Director of the Oxford Uehiro Centre for Practical Ethics
- Thomas Oxley - CEO of Synchron, Inventor of Stent rode
- Richard Di Natale – Australian Senator and leader of the Australian Greens
- Patrick McGorry – psychiatrist and Australian of the Year 2010
- John Murtagh AM – author of leading medical textbook John Murtagh’s General Practice
- Sam Prince – doctor, entrepreneur and philanthropist; founder of Zambrero
- Ranjana Srivastava – oncologist and author
