= Association for Women in Science =

The Association for Women in Science (AWIS) was founded in 1971 at the annual Federation of American Societies for Experimental Biology (FASEB) meeting. The organization aims to combat job discrimination, lower pay, and professional isolation. The main issue areas that the modern Association addresses are fair compensation, work-life integration, attrition, and professional development.

== History ==
AWIS was founded in 1971 at the annual meeting of the Federation of American Societies for Experimental Biology (FASEB), after a series of champagne brunches organized by an informal women's caucus. After establishing an executive director and an office in Washington, DC, chapters were organized across the country for individual members. Its founding co-presidents were Neena Schwartz and Judith Pool. Along with other women in science associations, an early AWIS action involved initiating a class action lawsuit against the National Institutes of Health (NIH) in response to poor representation on NIH grant review committees. The lawsuit was dropped after representatives of the groups, including Schwartz, met with Robert Marsten, then head of the NIH, who solicited recommendations and committed to appointing more women. Early projects include the creation of the AWIS Educational Foundation (now known as the Educational Awards) to receive donations and award fellowships. In 1997, AWIS won the Presidents Mentoring Award.

== Organization ==
As of 2026, the AWIS chair of board is Neelima Rao, and the CEO is Meridith Gibson.

== Activities and publications ==
AWIS activities include public advocacy, news and media distribution, and educational programs such as mentorship programs and scholarship awards. AWIS publishes a variety of materials to inform women about science programs and women's issues, including the quarterly AWIS Magazine and the AWIS in Action! Advocacy and Public Policy Newsletter.

== Charter ==
Representing the 7.4 million women working in STEM, AWIS members are professionals and students in a variety of STEM fields. Over 50% of AWIS members have doctorates in their respective fields.

AWIS has 49 chapters in the United States, which support local networking and mentorship, as well as outreach to young women considering careers in STEM.

== Coalitions and Partner Organizations ==
- STEM Education Coalition
- National Coalition for Women and Girls in Education (NCWGE)
- American Association of University Women (AAUW)
- Society of Women Engineers (SWE)
- Society of Hispanic Professional Engineers (SHPE)

== Notable members ==
- Carol Greider (Nobel Prize Winner in Physiology or Medicine, 2009 "for the discovery of how chromosomes are protected by telomeres and the enzyme telomerase")
- Phoebe Leboy (President 2008–2009)
- Lydia Villa-Komaroff (Molecular and cellular biologist who has been an academic laboratory scientist, a university administrator, and a business woman. She was the third Mexican American woman in the United States to receive a doctorate degree in the sciences (1975) and is a co-founding member of The Society for the Advancement of Chicanos/Hispanics and Native Americans in Science (SACNAS) and an AWIS Fellow, Class of 1998)
- Marion Webster, biochemist who served as president of AWIS

== See also ==
- List of prizes, medals, and awards for women in science
