= Sam Prince =

Sam Prince may refer to:

- Sam Prince (restaurateur), (born 1983) an Australian entrepreneur
- Sam Prince (journalist), a journalist with Heavy.com
- Sam Prince (TV personality), a cast member on the Made in Chelsea reality television show
