= Helen Wendler Deane =

American histochemist (1917–1966)

Helen W. Deane
- Deane at Harvard Medical School
- Born: Helen Wendler Deane; 1917; Franklin, North Carolina, US
- Died: July 20, 1966 (aged 49); Boston, Massachusetts, US
- Other name: Helen Wendler Deane Markham
- Education: Brown University; Wellesley College
- Spouse: George F. Markham (m. 1947)
- Scientific career
- Fields: Histochemistry, histophysiology
- Workplaces: Albert Einstein College of Medicine; Harvard Medical School; McGill University
- Thesis: A Cytological Study of the Diurnal Cycle of the Liver of the Mouse in Relation to Storage and Secretion (1943)
- Doctoral advisor: J. Walter Wilson

Helen Wendler Markham (née Deane; 1917 – 1966) was an American histochemist and histophysiologist. She researched the cytology and histology of the liver, ovaries, and adrenal glands. She was a professor at Harvard Medical School, where she was the first woman professor in the department of anatomy. She later taught at the Albert Einstein College of Medicine.

During her career, she published 147 journal articles and co-founded The Histochemical Society. She earned her PhD from Brown University and a bachelor's degree from Wellesley College. During McCarthyism, Deane was accused of being a Communist and was subpoenaed twice to appear before a Senate Committee chaired by William E. Jenner. Following the hearings, Harvard denied her tenure and terminated her position.

== Early life and education ==
Helen Wendler Deane was born in 1917 in Franklin, North Carolina, to Bertha and Julian Deane. Her parents were of English and German descent. She grew up in New England, attending public schools in Springfield, Massachusetts. She earned her BS cum laude from Wellesley College in 1938 where she studied zoology and was part of the Wellesley Choir. She then attended Brown University, earning her master's in biology in 1940 and her PhD in biology in 1943. In 1943 she was awarded Wellesley's Horton-Hallowell Fellowship. Her doctoral thesis on the mammalian liver, "A Cytological Study of the Diurnal Cycle of the Liver of the Mouse in Relation to Storage and Secretion", was done under J. Walter Wilson.

== Academic career ==
After completing her doctorate in 1943, Deane taught zoology for a term at McGill University in Montreal. She then joined Harvard Medical School's Department of Anatomy. She was an instructor from 1944 until 1948 and an associate in anatomy from 1948 to 1951. She became assistant professor in 1951. She was the department's first woman instructor and the first woman professor. She also taught a biology course at Samuel Adams School in 1945.

During her career, Deane conducted research into the histology and cytology of the liver, ovaries and adrenal glands. At Harvard, she collaborated with Roy O. Greep in tissue research, finding functional distinctions between the zona fasciculata and the zona glomerulosa of the adrenal cortex. She also conducted pioneering research with Albert Coons in localizing antigens in tissue sections. She collaborated with Manfred Karnovsky to demonstrate that aldehyde formation occurs in the lipids of steroid-secreting cells during fixation. She also used cytochemical procedures for demonstrating lysosomal enzymes to address stromal differentiation during uterine regression and the detection of follicular atresia. She studied the association of plasma cells, macrophages, and eosinophils in the lamina propria of the intestine.

=== Accusations of Communism ===
Morris: Mrs. Markham, are you at the present time a member of the Communist Party?
Jenner: Let the record show that the witness is consulting with counsel before answering the question.
Mrs. Markham: I am going to decline to answer that question, and I should like to have the opportunity to explain why, briefly.
Jenner: You may.
Mrs. Markham: It is demanded that all be loyal to the Constitution, and I am certainly loyal both to its letter and to its spirit. Under the fifth amendment, everyone has the protection of due process of the law, which means knowing the specific charges leveled against him, knowing his accusers, and having the opportunity to cross-examine these accusers. That opportunity has been completely denied in these hearings. I decline to answer that question upon the ground that my answer might tend to incriminate me.

In the 1950s, Deane was a victim of the McCarthyist attacks on professors in higher education who were alleged to be Communists. On March 27, 1953, Deane was subpoenaed to testify before a U.S. Senate subcommittee chaired by Indiana Senator William E. Jenner to address "subversive influence in the educational process". She was questioned about her involvement with the Communist Party by Jenner and Robert J. Morris. She refused to answer most of the questions, invoking the Fifth Amendment.

On May 20, Harvard issued a statement regarding three teachers brought before the committee, Deane, Wendell H. Furry, and Leon Kamin. The statement indicated that Deane was not a member of the Communist Party and that Harvard wouldn't be taking action against Deane as it did not consider her guilty of grave misconduct. She was brought before the Jenner Committee again on May 28.

=== Later career ===
Following her appearances before the Jenner Committee, Deane was denied tenure by Harvard and her position was terminated. She had difficulty finding employment.

Deane later returned to Harvard where she worked at the Biological Laboratories on visual mechanisms with Alexander Forbes. She was hired by the Albert Einstein College of Medicine in 1957 and earned the position of full professor. As a distinguished histochemist and histophysiologist, Deane published 147 journal articles, was the editor of The Adrenocortical Hormones, and co-founded The Histochemical Society.

== Death ==
Deane died of breast cancer on July 20, 1966, in Boston. She was 49 years old.

== Personal life ==
Deane married George F. Markham in 1947.

He worked for the International Fur & Leather Workers Union and was a candidate for the state legislature with the Progressive Party. They supported humanitarian causes.
