= De Sola Pool =

De Sola Pool is a surname. Notable people with the surname include:

- David de Sola Pool (1885–1970), spiritual leader of the Sephardic Congregation Shearith Israel in New York City, father of Ithiel
- Ithiel de Sola Pool (1917–1984), pioneer in the development of social science
