= Cornelia Channing =

American professor of physiology

- Born: April 23, 1938
- Died: April 8, 1985 (aged 46); Maryland
- Education: Harvard Medical School
- Known for: Biology of reproduction
- Awards: Newcomb Cleveland Prize (1969)
- Scientific career
- Fields: Physiology, endocrinology
- Institutions: University of Maryland

Cornelia "Nina" Channing (1938–1985) was an American professor of physiology at the University of Maryland School of Medicine. Her research focused on endocrinology and fertility; along with longtime collaborators Neena Schwartz and Darrell Ward, she was involved in the discovery of hormones involved in regulating the female reproductive cycle. She died of breast cancer in 1985.

== Early life and education ==
Channing was born in Boston, Massachusetts in 1938. She received her bachelor's degree from Hood College in 1961 and her PhD in biochemistry from Harvard Medical School in 1965, advised by Claude Villee. She worked as a postdoctoral fellow in Cambridge.

== Academic career ==
Channing returned to the US to serve as an instructor and later an assistant professor at the University of Pittsburgh, where she spent seven years in total. In 1973 she moved to the University of Maryland as an associate professor and was promoted to full professor in 1976. Channing served on the board of directors of the Society for the Study of Reproduction in 1978-80 and was the recipient of its first Research Award in 1978. Channing was a close collaborator of endocrinologist Neena Schwartz, whose work on their shared research interests continued after Channing's death; along with other researchers including Darrell Ward, they identified the peptide hormone inhibin and worked out molecular mechanisms of hormonal signaling in the female reproductive cycle. Channing's interest in the biology of reproduction was motivated in part by an interest in contraceptive research.
