= Phoebe S. Leboy =

American biochemist and advocate for women in science

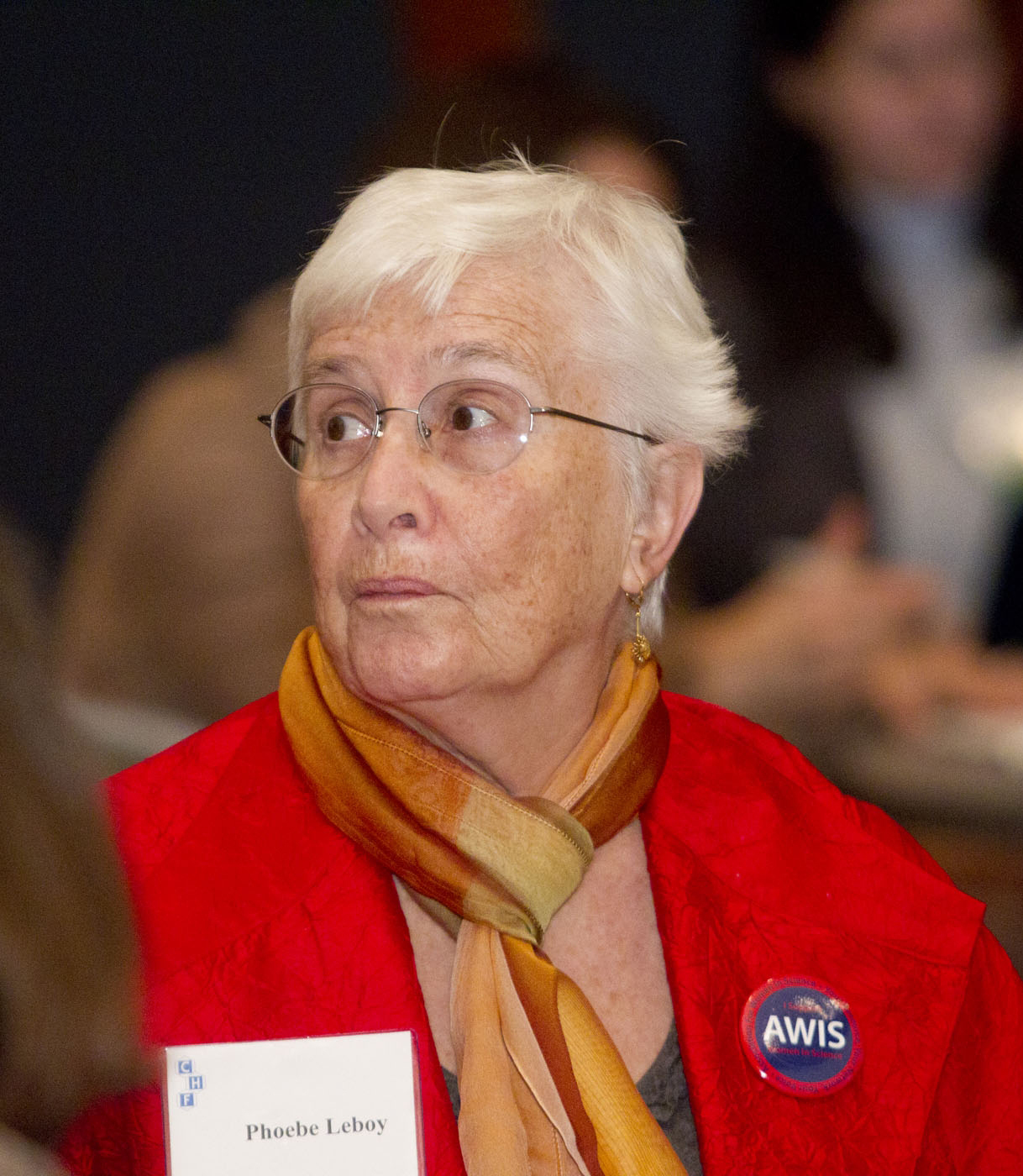
- Phoebe Leboy in 2011
- Born: July 29, 1936; Brooklyn, New York, United States
- Died: June 16, 2012 (aged 75); Narberth, Pennsylvania, United States
- Education: Swarthmore College (B.A., 1957), Bryn Mawr College (Ph.D, 1962)
- Scientific career
- Fields: Epigenetics, regenerative medicine
- Workplaces: University of Pennsylvania

Phoebe Starfield Leboy (July 29, 1936 – June 16, 2012) was an American biochemist and advocate for women in science.

== Education ==
Leboy earned a bachelor's degree in zoology from Swarthmore College in 1957 and a doctorate in biochemistry from Bryn Mawr College in 1962.

== Scientific career ==
Leboy worked as a research associate at Bryn Mawr (1962-3) and the University of Pennsylvania School of Medicine (1963-6), a postdoctoral fellow at the Weizmann Institute of Science (1966-7), and an assistant professor in the biochemistry department of the University of Pennsylvania School of Dental Medicine (1966–70). She was promoted to full professor in the dental school and graduate group in cell and molecular biology (1976-2000). Leboy chaired Penn's Faculty Senate (1981-2) and the dental school's biochemistry department (1992-5). She was a visiting professor at the University of California, San Francisco (1979–80) and Wolfson College of Oxford University (1989–90).

Leboy's early work dealt with nucleic acid modifications. She later focused upon bone-forming adult stem cells. Her research placed her at the forefront of epigenetics and regenerative medicine.

== Advocacy ==
Leboy was deeply concerned with the lack of professional opportunities for women in science. Though she found professional mentors, including a thesis advisor who encouraged her to start her own lab, "the closest I had [to a role model] was Madame Curie and even that was actually Greer Garson, the actress playing her in the movie!"

Leboy worked to make the University of Pennsylvania safer and more welcoming to women. In 1970, she chaired and founded Women for Equal Opportunity at the University of Pennsylvania (WEOUP). A series of on-campus rapes prompted her to organize a sit-in. She was a member of the University Council Committee on the Status of Women (Cohn Committee) and co-chaired Penn's Task Force on Gender Equity (2000-1).

She was active in the Association for Women in Science (AWIS) for decades and served in a variety of roles, including on the executive board (1974-6) and as President (2008-9). She also served on the American Society for Biochemistry Committee on Women (1972-5) and the American Association of University Professors (AAUP) Committee on Women (1985-8).

Leboy experienced explicit discrimination, told outright as a postdoc that neither she nor any other woman would be hired as an assistant professor. In the early 2000s, decades after "the really hard stuff" had been done to address sexism, Leboy doubted the relevance of AWIS--"and then Larry Summers opened his mouth." In response to those 2005 comments regarding the underrepresentation of women in science and engineering positions, she refocused AWIS on its advocacy function and looked to the more subtle systemic difficulties of women in science.

In 2012, the Phoebe Leboy Professional Development Award was created by the American Society for Bone and Mineral Research to support a female young investigator living outside the United States. The award has continued to be presented in years since, such as being won by Dr. Marlene Chakhtoura in 2015.

== Personal life ==
Leboy's marriage to Eugene Leboy ended in divorce. She later married Neal Nathanson and became the step-mother of his three children, Kate, John, and Daniel. Leboy died of amyotrophic lateral sclerosis.
