= Elizabeth Hartland =

Australian academic, microbiologist and immunologist

Elizabeth L. Hartland AM FAHMS
- Education: University of Melbourne
- Occupation: Immunologist
- Employer: Monash University
- Known for: Immunology
- Title: Professor
- Website: https://research.monash.edu/en/persons/elizabeth-hartland

Elizabeth Louise Hartland AM, who publishes as Elizabeth L. Hartland, is a microbiologist and immunologist, and Eureka prize judge. She was appointed a Member of the Order of Australia in 2024, for service to "medical research, particularly microbiology, and to tertiary education". She is CEO and Director of the Hudson Institute of Medical Research within Monash University.

== Education ==
Hartland received a Bachelor of Science (Hons), in 1990, a PhD in Microbiology and Immunology in 1996 for her thesis, "The genetic basis of virulence in Yersinia enterocolitica". She was then awarded a Bachelor of Arts from the University of Melbourne in 1997, and a Graduate Certificate in Higher Education in 2004, from Monash University.

== Career ==
Hartland worked at the Department of Biochemistry at Imperial College, at London, with a Royal Society/NHMCR Howard Florey Fellowship. She was one of the first ARC Future Fellows at the University of Melbourne. Hartland was the Head of the Department of Microbiology and Immunology at the University of Melbourne. She then was employed as the deputy director of the Doherty Institute. Hartland was also the president of the Association of Australian Medical Research Institutes (AAMRI). As at 2024, Hartland is the Director of the Hudson Institute of Medical Research.

Hartland's research interests include pathogenesis and infections which are involved with Gram-negative pathogens. She also has research interests in immune evasion and bacterial colonisation. Her main areas of expertise include cell intrinsic immunity, intestinal bacterial pathogens and human microbiota and immune responses.

Hartland has an oration at the Victorian Infection and Immunity Network named after her, where the winner receives prize money, and delivers a speech at the Lorne conference. She is also the chair of the Victorian Premier's award, for the selection panel of Health and Medical Research.

== Publications ==
Hartland has over 165 publications, with an H-index of 58 and over 10,000 citations as at July 2024, according to Google Scholar.

- Marshall, S. A., Young, R. B., Lewis, J. M., Rutten, E. L., Gould, J., Barlow, C. K., Giogha, C., Marcelino, V. R., Fields, N., Schittenhelm, R. B., Hartland, E. L., Scott, N. E., Forster, S. C. & Gulliver, E. L., (2023) The broccoli-derived antioxidant sulforaphane changes the growth of gastrointestinal microbiota, allowing for the production of anti-inflammatory metabolites,Journal of Functional Foods. 107,105645, ISSN 1756-4646.
- Giogha C, Scott NE, Wong Fok Lung T, Pollock GL, Harper M, Goddard-Borger ED, et al. (2021) NleB2 from enteropathogenic Escherichia coli is a novel arginine-glucose transferase effector. PLoS Pathog 17(6): e1009658.
- Srikhanta, Y.N., Gorrell, R.J., Power, P.M. et al. (2017) Methylomic and phenotypic analysis of the ModH5 phasevarion of Helicobacter pylori . Sci Rep 7, 16140.
- Hartland, E. Bacterial pathogenesis: (2017) Legionella phosphoinositide tailoring. Nat Microbiol 2, 17013.

== Awards ==
- 2014 – Eureka Prize finalist
- 2015 – NHMRC – Project grant
- 2024 – NHMRC – Investigator grant
- 2024 – Member of the Order of Australia, King's Birthday awards
- 2024 – Fellow of the Australian Academy of Health and Medical Sciences
