= Journal of Histochemistry and Cytochemistry =

- Discipline: Cell biology
- Language: English
- Edited by: Stephen M. Hewitt

Publication details
- History: 1953-present
- Publisher: SAGE Publications on behalf of The Histochemical Society (United States)
- Frequency: Monthly
- Open access: Delayed, after 12 months
- Impact factor: 4.137 (2021)

Standard abbreviations
- ISO 4: J. Histochem. Cytochem.

Indexing
- CODEN: JHCYAS
- ISSN: 0022-1554 (print); 1551-5044 (web)
- LCCN: a54002826

Links
- Journal homepage

The Journal of Histochemistry and Cytochemistry is a peer-reviewed scientific journal of cell biology established in 1953. It covers research in the structure and function of cells, tissues, and organs as well as components of development, differentiation, and disease, as well as microscopy and imaging techniques. The journal is the official publication of The Histochemical Society and is published by SAGE Publications. The editor-in-chief as of January 1, 2016 is Stephen M. Hewitt of the National Cancer Institute, National Institutes of Health, in Bethesda Maryland, USA. The immediate past editor-in-chief is John R. Couchman (University of Copenhagen). The journal is published online and in print monthly. Journal content is available for free after twelve months.

== History ==
The Histochemical Society was founded in 1950 and at its 1951 meeting a committee tasked with creating a journal for histochemistry was appointed. The founding editor was Ralph D. Lillie and the first issue of the Journal of Histochemistry and Cytochemistry was published in January 1953.

In 1997, the journal began publishing online through HighWire Press and beginning in 2004 began to digitize all of its back content. All content back to and including 1953 is now available online.

== Abstracting and indexing ==
The journal is abstracted and indexed in Scopus and the Social Sciences Citation Index. According to the Journal Citation Reports, its 2021 impact factor is 4.137.
