= Judith Graham Pool =

American scientist (1919–1975)

- Born: Judith Ethel Graham; June 1, 1919; Queens, New York, US
- Died: July 13, 1975 (aged 56); Stanford, California, US
- Resting place: Hills of Eternity Memorial Park
- Education: University of Chicago
- Known for: Discovery of cryoprecipitate
- Scientific career
- Fields: Medicine
- Workplaces: Stanford University

Judith Ethel Graham Pool (June 1, 1919 — July 13, 1975) was an American scientist. She is best known for the discovery of cryoprecipitation, a process for creating concentrated blood clotting factors which significantly improved the quality of life for hemophiliacs around the world.

== Background ==
Judith Graham was born on June 1, 1919 in Queens, New York into a Jewish family. Her mother was a school teacher and her father was a stockbroker. She married Ithiel de Sola Pool, a political scientist, in her junior year. She left her graduate program when she gave birth to her two sons, Jonathan Robert and Jeremy David Pool, in the 1940s. The couple divorced in the 1950s. She moved to Oslo, Norway in 1958—1959. She had a daughter twenty years after the birth of her second son, and married Maurice Sokolow, professor of medicine and hematology. Their marriage ended after three years.

Judith Pool died at age 56, from a brain tumor.

== Education ==
Pool studied physics at the University of Chicago, then went on to graduate work and served as an assistant in her department. She taught physics at Hobart College in Geneva, N.Y., while writing her dissertation on the electrophysiology of muscle fibers. She finally completed her degree in 1946, produced a remarkable study of the electropotential of a single isolated muscle fiber. After her doctoral degree, she moved to California with her family and obtained a research position at the Stanford Research Institute. In 1953, she began to do blood coagulation studies at the Stanford School of Medicine as a research fellow supported by a Bank of America-Giannini Foundation grant. She went to Oslo, Norway, on a Fulbright research fellowship.

== Career ==
She was a Stanford senior research associate from 1956 to 1970, then advanced to senior scientist in 1970. In 1972, she was promoted to full professor with a high professorial rank. She also gave lectures, such as the Paul M. Aggeler Memorial Lecture in 1974, at several institutions and congresses. She was a member of the national scientific advisory committees of the National Institutes of Health and the American Red Cross Blood Program, the Advisory Committee of the National Blood Resource Program, the Medical and Scientific Advisory Committee of the National Hemophilia Foundation, the Medical and Scientific Advisory Committee of the World Federation of Hemophilia, and the editorial boards of Transfusion and the American Journal of Hematology.

In her last year, she spent most of her time and effort on advocacy of greater opportunities for women in science nationally. She founded and chaired the Professional Women of Stanford University Medical School organization, was a founding member and co-president (along with Neena Schwartz) of the Association for Women in Science in 1971, and was a member of the AWIS steering committee from 1972 to 1973.

== Contribution ==
Pool's work on blood coagulation resulted in the development of a cold-insoluble protein fraction of blood plasma, cryoprecipitate, which contains an antihemophilic factor (AHF) still used in blood banks. She received awards for this discovery. Pool's major observation was that factor VIII can be simply and cheaply prepared from frozen human plasma, and can be easily and safely given to patients with hemophilia A, the subset of hemophilia resulting from a deficiency in factor VIII. Cryorecipitate can be used to terminate bleeding in the hemophiliac patient, or to preoperatively prepare the hemophiliac patient. In addition to devising and introducing into clinical medicine a preparation containing the lacking protein in the hemophiliacs, which changed their treatment in a major way, she also made a number of contributions on the extraction, preservation, and survival of proteins. At the time of her death, she was widely respected in the field of hematology.

== Legacy ==
In 1972 The National Bleeding Disorder Foundation (NBDF) launched a research fellowship program called the Judith Graham Pool Postdoctoral Research Fellowship. The foundation funds new research developments made possible by Pool's 1965 discovery and formulation of cryoprecipitate. JGP research fellows are doctoral or postdoctoral students researching hemophilia or other bleeding disorders.

=== Selected work ===
- Measurements of membrane potential in a single muscle fiber (with Dr. Ralph W. Gerard), 1942
- The coagulation of the blood, contribution on assays of coagulation factors
- The coagulation of the blood, in vitro synthesis of coagulation factors
- The coagulation of the blood, antibody inhibitors of factor VIII, 1954
- The Fifth Annual Paul M. Aggeler Memorial Lecture, 1974

== Honors ==
- The Murray Thelin Award of the National Hemophilia Foundation, 1968
- The Elizabeth Blackwell Award from Hobart and William Smith Colleges, 1973
- The Paul M. Aggeler Memorial Lectureship, 1974
- The Professional Achievement Award from University of Chicago, 1975
- The National Hemophilia Foundation renamed its Research Fellowship Awards the Judith Graham Pool Research Fellowships
