= Marion Webster =

American biochemist

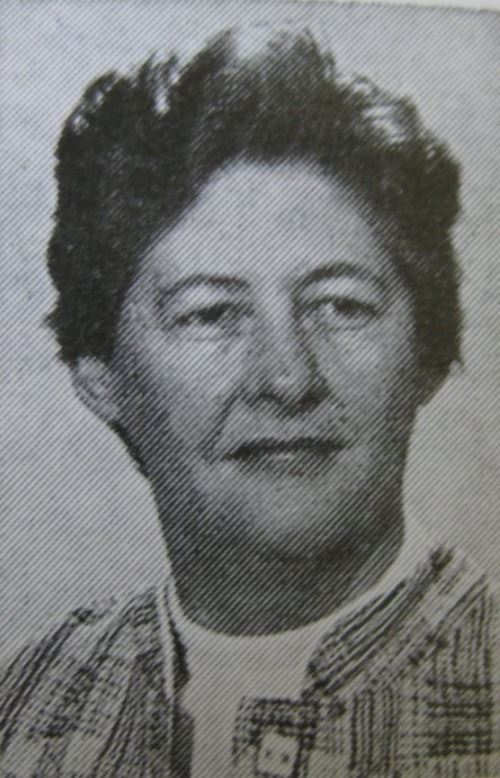
- Born: Marion Elizabeth Webster; April 9, 1921; Ottawa, Ontario, Canada
- Died: July 6, 1985 (aged 64); Winter Park, Florida, US
- Other name: Marion Webster-Bukovsky
- Citizenship: Canada; United States
- Education: Florida State University; Georgetown University
- Scientific career
- Fields: Biochemistry
- Workplaces: United States Department of Agriculture; Walter Reed Army Institute of Research; National Heart, Lung, and Blood Institute
- Thesis: The Purification of Vi Antigen from Salmonella Coli (1950)

Marion Elizabeth Webster-Bukovsky (née Webster; April 9, 1921 − July 6, 1985) was a Canadian-American biochemist who was the first to isolate the Vi antigen of typhoid and to determine its structure. She published extensively on the kinin–kallikrein system while at the National Heart, Lung, and Blood Institute. Webster was an advocate for women in science and served as president of the Association for Women in Science and Graduate Women in Science.

== Career and research ==
After graduating from Florida State University, Webster joined a team of scientists at the United States Department of Agriculture who developed DDT as an insecticide. She then joined the Walter Reed Army Institute of Research, and earned a Ph.D. at Georgetown University. Her 1950 dissertation was titled, The Purification of Vi Antigen from Salmonella Coli. Webster was the first to isolate the Vi antigen of typhoid and to determine its structure. Joining NIH’s National Heart, Lung, and Blood Institute (NHLBI) in 1958, Webster published extensively on the kinin–kallikrein system.

An advocate for women in science, Webster believed in helping other women develop their careers, so she served as president of the Association for Women in Science and Graduate Women in Science. Webster was a member of the American Chemical Society, American Association for the Advancement of Science, American Association of Clinical Chemists, American Society for Pharmacology and Experimental Therapeutics, American Physiological Society, International Society for Biochemical Pharmacology, New York Academy of Sciences, and the Society of Experimental Biology and Medicine.

== Personal life ==
Marion Elizabeth Webster was born in Ottawa on April 9, 1921. She married Alexis P. Bukovsky. Webster moved from Washington, D.C., to Winter Park, Florida, in 1976. She was a member of the First United Methodist Church and Virginia Heights Association in Winter Park. She served as a member the Winter Park Housing Authority Commission. Webster died on July 6, 1985, in Winter Park. She was survived by her husband and brothers, Bruce S. Webster of North Fort Myers, Florida, and Donald A. Webster of Ottawa. Webster was buried at Palm Cemetery in Florida.

== Selected works ==
- Landerman, Nathaniel S.; Webster, Marion E.; Becker, Elmer L.; Ratcliffe, Harold E. (July 1962). "Hereditary Angioneurotic Edema". Journal of Allergy. 33 (4): 330–341. doi:10.1016/0021-8707(62)90032-1. PMID 14461960.
- Webster, Marion E.; Gilmore, Joseph P. (April 1964). "Influence of Kallidin-10 on Renal Function". American Journal of Physiology. Legacy Content. 206 (4): 714–718. doi:10.1152/ajplegacy.1964.206.4.714. ISSN 0002-9513. PMID 14166162.
- Webster, Marion E. (June 1966). "The Kallikrein-Kininogen-Kinin System". Arthritis & Rheumatism. 9 (3): 473–482. doi:10.1002/art.1780090311. PMID 5938060.
- Webster, Marion E.; Pierce, Jack V. (December 2006). "The Nature of the Kallidins Released from Human Plasma by Kallikreins and other Enzymes". Annals of the New York Academy of Sciences. 104 (1): 91–107. doi:10.1111/j.1749-6632.1963.tb17655.x. PMID 13999415. S2CID 20156560.
