= Col du Lein =

Mountain pass in the Swiss Alps

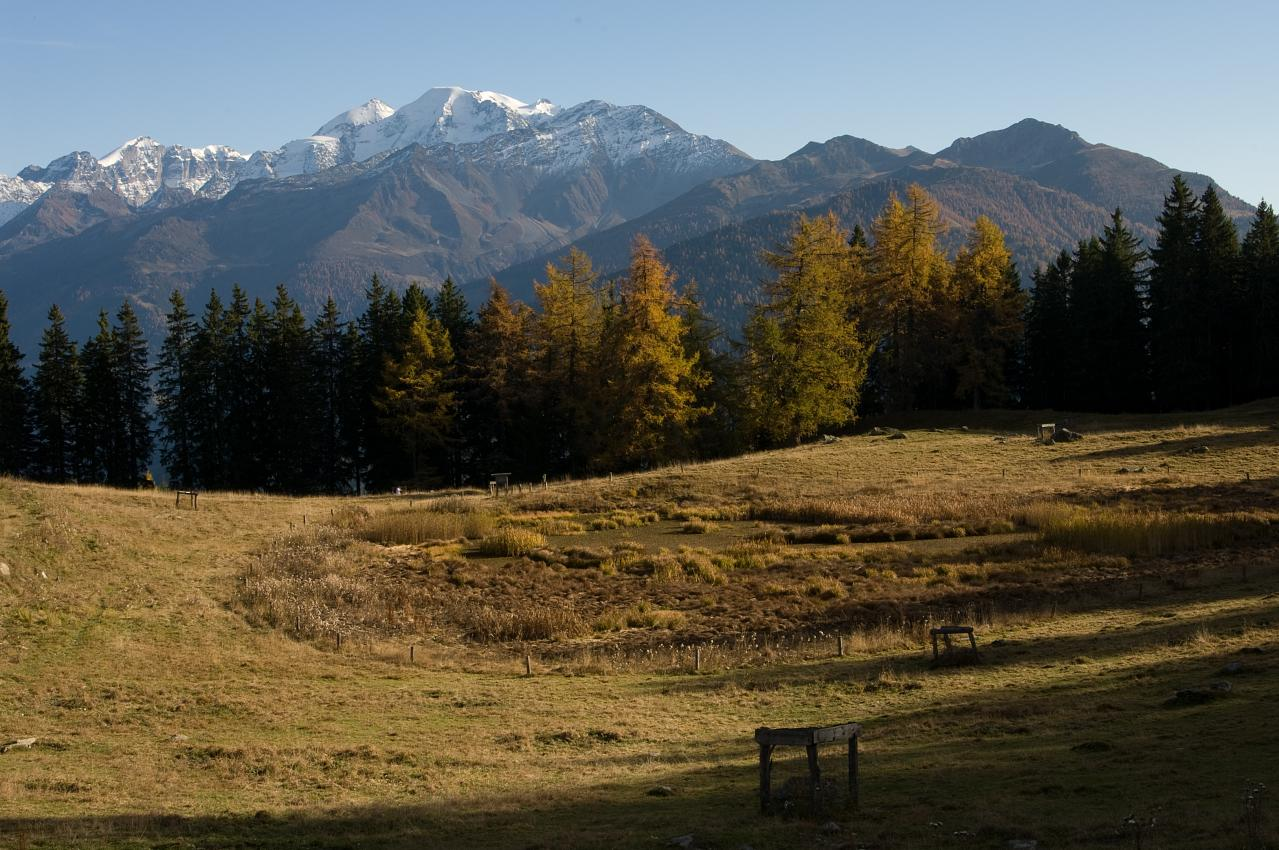
- Interactive map of Col du Lein
- Elevation: 1,623 metres (5,325 ft)
- Traversed by: Unpaved road

Third Approach
- Location: Switzerland
- Range: Alps
- Coordinates: 46°6′48″N 7°9′33″E

Col du Lein (el. 1623 m.) is a high mountain pass in the Alps in the canton of Valais in Switzerland. It connects Saxon in the valley of the Rhône with Vollèges in the Val de Bagnes.

== See also ==
- List of highest paved roads in Europe
- List of mountain passes
