= Allen Lein =

American endocrinologist (1913–2003)

- Born: April 15, 1913; New York City, New York, U.S.
- Died: March 26, 2003 (aged 89); Austin, Texas, U.S.
- Education: University of California, Los Angeles (BA, PhD); University of Chicago
- Known for: Research on reproductive endocrinology; Guggenheim Fellowship
- Awards: Guggenheim Fellowship (1958–1959)
- Scientific career
- Fields: Endocrinology
- Doctoral students: Neena Schwartz

Allen Lein (April 15, 1913, in New York City, New York – March 26, 2003, in Austin, Texas) was an endocrinologist and medical school professor. He was a Guggenheim Fellow for the academic year 1958–1959.

== Education ==
Lein was a student at the University of Chicago and then transferred to the University of California, Los Angeles (UCLA), where he graduated with bachelor's degree and Ph.D. in zoology, with a focus on endocrinology.

== Career ==
During WW II, he served from 1943 to 1946 as an aviation physiologist in the U.S. Army and left with the rank of captain. After teaching at the Ohio State University and Vanderbilt medical schools, he became in 1947 an assistant professor in the physiology department of Northwestern University Medical School. There he eventually became a full professor, director of student affairs, and assistant dean of graduate studies. For the academic year 1954–1955, he was on sabbatical at Caltech, where he worked with Linus Pauling and together they wrote a paper entitled The Combining Power of Myoglobin for Alkyl Isocyanides and the Structure of the Myoglobin Molecule. For the academic year 1958–1959 Lein was a Guggenheim Fellow at the Laboratoire de Biochimie, Collège de France.

In 1968 Lein became a professor of reproductive medicine at La Jolla's University of California San Diego School of Medicine, where he retired as professor emeritus in 1980.

During his tenure at UCSD he also served as associate dean for graduate studies, initiating the school’s very successful and competitive joint M.D./Ph.D. program, at that time only the third such program on the west coast. He also served as associate dean for academic affairs, and as director of UCSD’s Health Professions Honors Program ...

His 135-page book The Cycling Female: Her Menstrual Rhythm was published in 1979 by W. H. Freeman and Company.

Lein stayed in La Jolla and remained active in teaching and research for many years after his formal retirement. Shortly before he died of a heart attack in 2003, he and his wife moved to Texas to be near their daughter.

His doctoral students include Neena Schwartz.

Upon his death he was survived by his widow, a daughter, a son, and three grandchildren.

== Selected publications ==
- Lein, Allen (1943). "Studies on the fixation of radioactive iodine by the rabbit thyroid". Endocrinology. 32 (5): 429–432. doi:10.1210/endo-32-5-429. ISSN 0013-7227.
- Whitehorn, W. V.; Lein, Allen; Edelmann, Abraham (1946). "The general tolerance and cardiovascular responses of animals to explosive decompression". American Journal of Physiology. Legacy Content. 147 (2): 289–298. doi:10.1152/ajplegacy.1946.147.2.289. ISSN 0002-9513. PMID 21000750.
- Lein, Allen; Schwartz, Neena (1951). "Ceric Sulfate-Arsenious Acid Reaction in Microdetermination of Iodine". Analytical Chemistry. 23 (10): 1507–1510. doi:10.1021/ac60058a049.
- Lein, Allen; Dowben, Robert M. (1961). "Uptake and binding of thyroxine and triiodothyronine by rat diaphragm in vitro". American Journal of Physiology. Legacy Content. 200 (5): 1029–1031. doi:10.1152/ajplegacy.1961.200.5.1029. PMID 13760571.
- Colwell, J. A.; Lein, A. (1963). "Effect of Site of Administration of Insulin on Blood Glucose and Fatty Acid Concentrations". Diabetes. 12 (4): 319–322. doi:10.2337/diab.12.4.319. PMID 14081843. S2CID 40328189.
- Colwell, J. A.; Lein, A. (1963). "Quantitative Relationship Between Plasma Concentration of Fatty Acids and Glucose in Normal and Diabetic Dogs". Diabetes. 12 (5): 424–428. doi:10.2337/diab.12.5.424. PMID 14067740. S2CID 45715916.
- Colwell, J. A.; Lein, A. (1967). "Diminished Insulin Response to Hyperglycemia in Prediabetes and Diabetes". Diabetes. 16 (8): 560–565. doi:10.2337/diab.16.8.560. PMID 6041184. S2CID 45759767.
- Wang, C. F.; Lasley, B. L.; Lein, A.; Yen, S. S. C. (1976). "The Functional Changes of the Pituitary Gonadotrophs During the Menstrual Cycle". The Journal of Clinical Endocrinology & Metabolism. 42 (4): 718–728. doi:10.1210/jcem-42-4-718. PMID 770496.
- Yen, S.S.C.; Lein, A. (1976). "The apparent paradox of the negative and positive feedback control system on gonadotropin secretion". American Journal of Obstetrics and Gynecology. 126 (7): 942–954. doi:10.1016/0002-9378(76)90681-5. PMID 793393.
- Rigg, L.A.; Lein, A.; Yen, S.S.C. (1977). "Pattern of increase in circulating prolactin levels during human gestation". American Journal of Obstetrics and Gynecology. 129 (4): 454–456. doi:10.1016/0002-9378(77)90594-4. PMID 910825.
