= The Histochemical Society =

- Founded: 1950
- Founder: Charles Leblond, Ralph D. Lillie, Edward Dempsey
- Location: Bethesda, Maryland
- Members: 300
- Key people: A. Sally Davis: President; Kendra LaDuca: Executive Director; Scott Tanner: Secretary/Treasurer; Joseph Cheatwood: President-Elect
- Website: www.histochemicalsociety.org

The Histochemical Society (HCS) is an academic society that was founded on March 24, 1950 at a meeting organized by Ralph D. Lillie of the National Institutes of Health. The idea for the Society arose during the 1949 Biological Stain Commission meeting at which a symposia encompassing anatomy, cytology, pathology and biochemistry was proposed by Lillie, Charles Leblond and Edward Dempsey. Lillie became the first editor of HCS's journal, Journal of Histochemistry and Cytochemistry.

The Society is an interdisciplinary body of cell biologists, pathologists, anatomists, biochemists, and neuroscientists. HCS's mission is the development and use of visual techniques that provide biochemical and molecular information about the structure and function of cells, tissues and organs and for the dissemination of this knowledge through education and outreach. The Society fulfills its mission through publishing its Journal, the Journal of Histochemistry and Cytochemistry, and through the management of annual meetings and short courses.

The Histochemical Society's offices are in Bethesda, Maryland. The Society is a member society of the Federation of American Societies for Experimental Biology (FASEB) and the International Federation of Societies for Histochemistry and Cytochemistry.

== Publications ==
The Histochemical Society owns the Journal of Histochemistry and Cytochemistry; the Journal is published for the Society by SAGE Publications.

- The Journal of Histochemistry and Cytochemistry, JHC, publishes primary research on the structure and function of cells, tissues, and organs, as well as mechanisms of development, differentiation, and disease. Of additional importance are new developments in microscopy and imaging, particularly new techniques highlighting current research in genetics, molecular biology and biochemistry. The Journal is published monthly, both in print and online. The Editor-in-Chief, Stephen M. Hewitt (National Cancer Institute) is assisted by a managing editor, an executive editor, three associate editors and an editorial board.
- The Histochemical Society Newsletter regularly publishes a newsletter that offers updates on meetings, workshops, awards and HCS initiatives. The newsletter is complimentary to all HCS members.

== Meetings ==
The Histochemical Society hosts an annual meeting consisting of scientific plenary talks and symposia, student poster sessions, and an awards presentation and business meeting.

Since becoming a FASEB society in 2011, the HCS annual meetings are typically held in coordination with other FASEB organizations. Although HCS annual meetings are frequently held as part of the broader Experimental Biology Conference, the 2023 HCS annual meeting on "Tissue, Matrix, and Pathobiology" was held in partnership with the American Society for Matrix Biology and the American Society for Investigative Pathology, in Salt Lake City, Utah.

== Awards ==
Awards presented at the HCS annual meeting:

- New Investigator Award
- Vector Laboratories Young Investigator Award
- Ralph D. Lillie Award
- Trainee Travel Awards

The HCS also provide assistance to further trainee/student research projects. Specifically, the Capstone Grants for undergraduate students and the Cornerstone Grants for graduate medical trainees and graduate students.

== Courses ==
The HCS founded the Immunohistochemistry and Microscopy Course (IHCM) is course in 2008 and HCS members continue to act as the academic faculty. The IHCM course gives participants extensive hands-on experience with immunohistochemical techniques and a broad range of microscopy imaging modalities. The course emphasizes in-depth theory, didactic lectures, small group discussions, troubleshooting, and informal interactions among faculty and participants. The IHCM course prepares participants to independently carry out immunohistochemistry and imaging in their own laboratories and to critically evaluate and troubleshoot problems that arise when using these techniques.

== Advocacy ==
HCS supports public advocacy of the issues that are important to and affect the biomedical research community through membership in FASEB.

== Committees ==
- Awards and Membership Committee
- Finance Committee
- Program Committee
- Publications Committee
- Communication Committee
- Education Committee
