= Monash Institute of Medical Research =

- Successor: Hudson Institute of Medical Research
- Formation: 1991
- Dissolved: January 2014
- Type: Nonprofit organisation
- Purpose: Medical research
- Headquarters: 27-31 Wright Street, Clayton
- Location: Clayton, Victoria, Australia
- Coordinates: 37.921963°S 145.12516°E
- Director: Professor Bryan Williams
- Staff: approx. 400
- Website: www.hudson.org.au

The Monash Institute of Medical Research (MIMR), was an Australian medical research institute located in the Melbourne suburb of Clayton, Victoria, consisting of 400 scientists and students belonging to the Faculty of Medicine, Nursing and Health Sciences at Monash University. In January 2014 the Institute merged with Prince Henry's Institute of Medical Research and has since been renamed the Hudson Institute of Medical Research.

The focus of the work of MIMR was research into the characterisation and application of stem cells, the cause and treatment of inflammation and cancer, and the improvement of women's, men's and children's health. The reputation of MIMR has been built on advances in assisted human reproduction, the reduction of Sudden infant death syndrome (SIDS), advances in stem cell research and the treatment of arthritis. Together with the collaborative resources of Monash University and the Monash Health Research Precinct, the impact of MIMR research by translation from 'bench to bedside' is increased by the commercialisation of its activities.

== History ==
The Monash Institute of Medical Research was founded in 1991 by Emeritus Professor David de Kretser AC. de Kretser's passion for reproductive and developmental health was the driving force behind the formation of the then named Monash Institute for Reproduction and Development. The Institute has seven research centres with a staff of 400 scientists and students.

While the original themes of fertility, preterm infant health and prostate cancer are still key research areas, the research focus of MIMR has broadened to include research into cancer, inflammation and infectious diseases, women’s health, stem cell research, pain medicine and palliative care.

Professor de Kretser retired as Institute Director in 2005 to become the Governor of Victoria. In January 2006, Professor Bryan Williams commenced as Institute Director.
