= Zambrero =

Australian multinational fast-food franchise serving Mexican cuisine

- Type: Franchise system
- Industry: Restaurant
- Founded: 2005
- Founder: Sam Prince
- Number of locations: 339 (2025)
- Areas served: Australia; Ireland; New Zealand; United Kingdom; United States
- Key people: Daryl McCormack (CEO)
- Products: Mexican food
- Website: www.zambrero.com.au

Zambrero is an Australian multinational fast food restaurant franchise serving Mexican cuisine. It operates in Australia, New Zealand, Ireland, the US and the UK, with over 300 restaurants globally. It is one of Australia's largest Mexican food franchises with 285 stores in the country.

It was founded in Canberra by then-medical student Sam Prince with the idea of using the profits to support humanitarian causes. The chain donates a meal to someone in need in the developing world for every meal purchased through their Plate4Plate program; as of December 2025, it has donated over 100 million meals.

== Locations ==
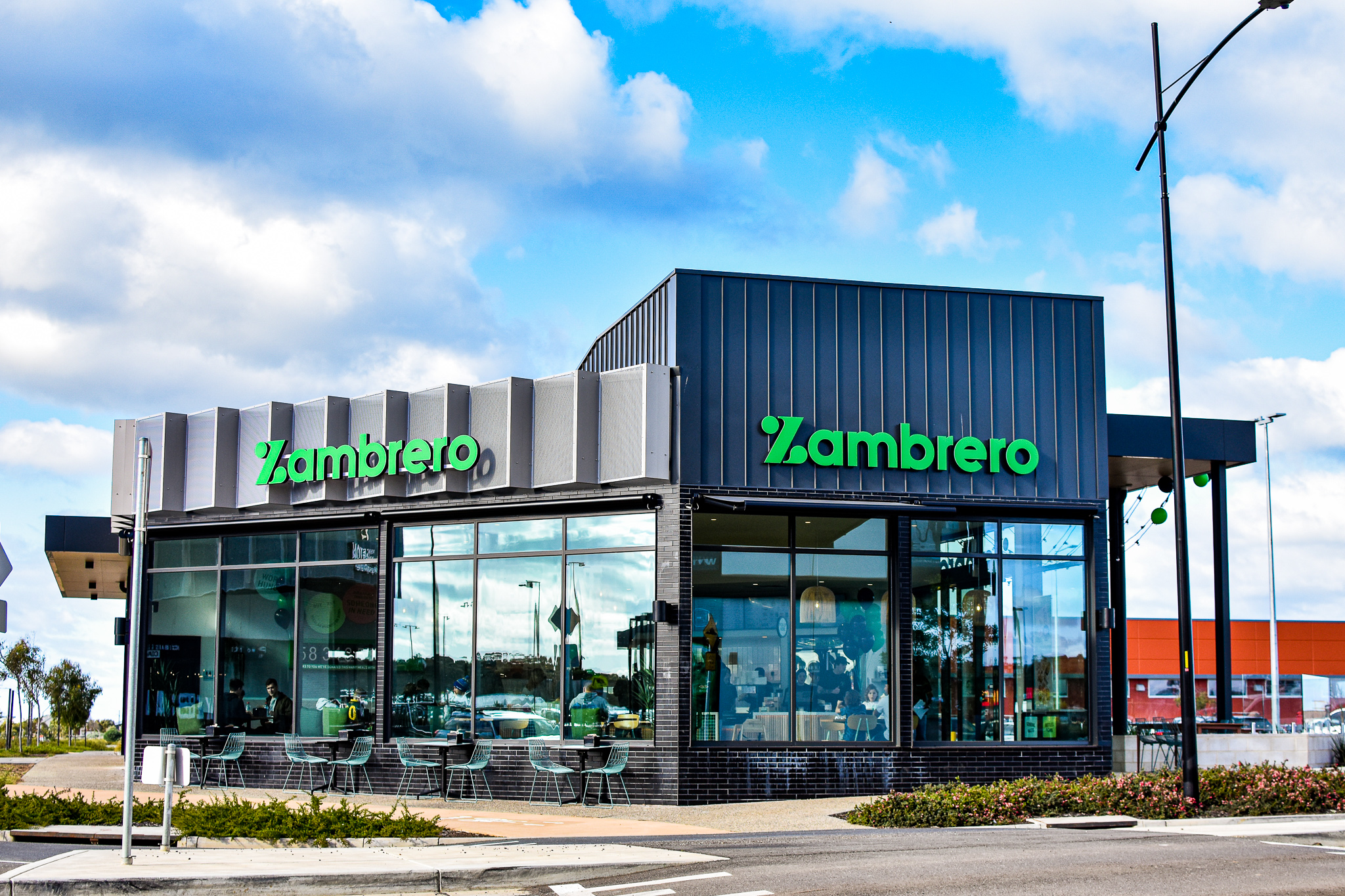
Zambrero restaurant in Ocean Grove, Victoria

Zambrero opened its first restaurant in Lonsdale Street, Braddon in 2005, opening its 100th restaurant a decade later in Midland, Western Australia. Zambrero was recognised as one of Australia's fastest growing franchises on the BRW Fastest Franchises List for 2011, 2012 and 2013 and Fast 100 List for 2014 and 2015.

Zambrero opened its first restaurant in New Zealand in November 2014, in Dublin, Ireland in March 2016 and opened its first two restaurants in United States on 20 March 2018. As of October 2025, Zambrero has 339 restaurants in Australia, New Zealand, Ireland, the US and the UK. Australia has 285 of the stores.

== Philanthropy ==
In conjunction with partner organisation Rise Against Hunger, Zambrero's Plate 4 Plate initiative has donated 90,000,000 meals.

The company had shifted from an earlier goal of supplying educational resources to indigenous communities and developing countries, for which Prince had founded the E-magine Foundation in 2007, to reducing global hunger.

== Accolades ==
Zambrero won the “Australian Business Awards Enterprise of the Year” award in 2015 and in 2016 the QSR Media “Best Corporate Social Responsibility Initiative” and “Best Sustainability Initiative” awards.

== Nutrition ==
A 2016 study by the George Institute for Global Health, analysing 229 small meals and snacks from 25 fast food chains, found Zambrero's pork nachos to have the highest kilojoule count.

== See also ==
- List of restaurants in Australia
- List of Mexican restaurants
