= Ithiel de Sola Pool =

American social scientist (1917–1984)

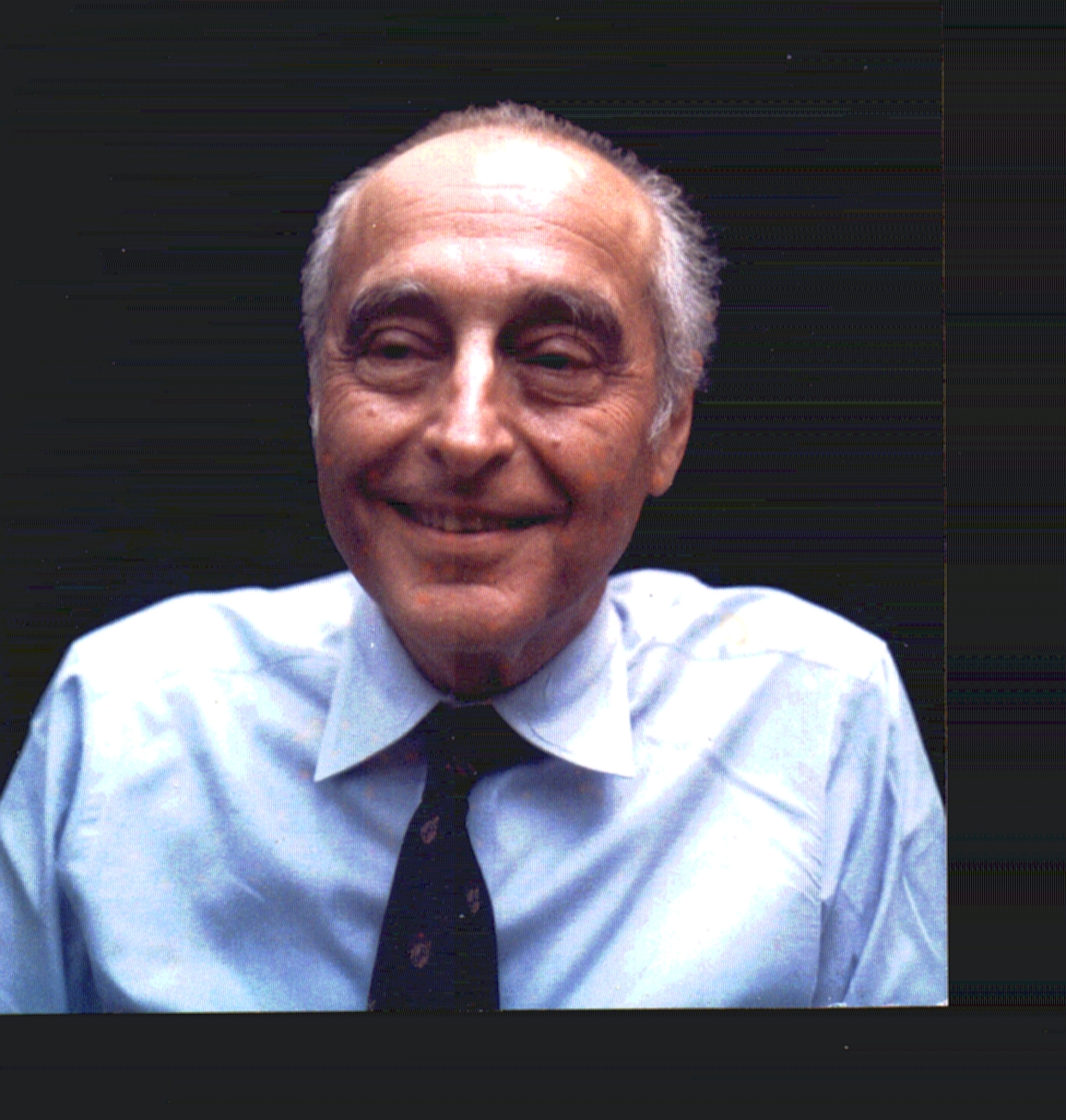
- Born: 26 October 1917
- Died: 11 March 1984
- Spouse: Judith Graham Pool

Ithiel de Sola Pool (October 26, 1917 – March 11, 1984) was an American academic who was a widely celebrated and often controversial figure in the field of social sciences and information technology. He did significant research on technology and its effects on society. He coined the term "convergence" to describe the effect of various scientific innovations on society in a futuristic world, and made predictions of ways that technology would impact society that were often prescient. In his 1983 book Technologies of Freedom, he predicted that digital electronics would allow convergence between historically separated modes of communication, and that these modes would eventually become one single grand system.

== Early life and education ==
De Sola Pool was the son of David de Sola Pool, rabbi of the Sephardic Congregation Shearith Israel in New York City. His mother was Tamar Hirschensohn, the Ottoman Palestine-born daughter of Rabbi Chaim Hirschensohn. His sister was Naomi de Sola Pool, a physician.

Pool was initially educated at an Ethical Culture School in New York City. He attended the University of Chicago, where he received a Bachelor of Arts in 1938, a Master of Arts in 1939, and his Ph.D. in 1952. The university was under the direction of Robert Maynard Hutchins, its president from 1929 to 1945, a period when it was called "the birthplace of modern American social sciences."

== Career ==
During World War II, Pool went to Washington, D.C., where, under Harold Lasswell, he studied and researched the effects of Nazi and communist propaganda. He held academic appointments at Hobart College, Stanford University, and at Massachusetts Institute of Technology, where he joined the MIT Center for International Studies. He remained at MIT for more than 30 years, researching the effects of communication technology on global politics.

=== Work ===
Ithiel de Sola Pool's early work as a graduate assistant and later collaborator with Harold Lasswell was quantitative methods of "content analysis," a method for the emerging era of mass communications in world politics (democratic, totalitarian, and revolutionary). Early quantitative methods were crude and expensive and used frequency counts (e.g., symbols of democracy). The pioneers of content analysis set aside most of their research programs to await reduced costs and new technologies (now emerging in the 21st century). Most had personal experience with psychoanalysis and shared views of early critics of content analysis that counting the frequencies of words was simplistic. Their vision was to develop capacities for empathy and build the study of communication flows as the equivalent investment for the wider social science understanding of the world that national income statistics achieved for the early growth of macroeconomics. (The GDELT Project, with contributions from Pool's tradition and MIT Political Science graduates, has provided new data for evaluating this strategic idea for the social sciences.)

Pool's most original theoretical contribution probably was the mathematical analysis of contact networks, public opinion, and influence that became known publicly as the small world hypothesis and as the Six Degrees of Separation.

Pool became a leading authority on the social and political effects of communications. He served as senior editor of The Communications Handbook (1973), which included his highly regarded chapter "Public Opinion." In 1983, Pool pioneered "retrospective technology assessment" to study forecasting methods for the impact of innovations in communication technology with publications such as "Forecasting the Telephone" and "Communication Flows." His book Technologies of Freedom framed policy discussions in the early decades of the digital revolution.

Pool's 1983 publication "Tracking the Flow of Information" made a series of predictions that came to accurately describe aspects of 21st-century digital communication: growing quickly and increasingly electronic, with people experiencing information overload and fragmented streams of information. This work and collaboration with Roger Hurwitz and Hirshue Inose (to organize an early census of communication flows in Japan and the US) were among the pioneering studies of the growth of the global information society.

Pool was the chair and founder of the MIT Political Science Department. He often studied public policy challenges (e.g., the impact of television on violence) and advised the United States and others on various matters. His American Business and Public Policy (Bauer, Pool, and Dexter) remains the best study of lobbying and Congressional influence as American corporations faced, in the early 1960s, issues of trade policy and a globalizing national economy. Pool and collaborators (Abelson and Popkin) pioneered the first large-scale computer simulation of public opinion and election strategies for the Kennedy Presidential campaign. After the Cuban Missile Crisis in 1965, Pool wrote "The Kaiser, the Tsar, and the Computer," a computer simulation of international crisis decisions exploring the theory that the outbreak of WWI was based on stress-induced misperceptions and errors. (The early work on content analysis identified the study of stress effects as a revealing line of analysis: Irving Janis, involved from these early years in thinking about uses of micro-level content analysis, evolved this work in his Victims of Groupthink applications to American foreign policy.) Perhaps Pool's most influential contribution to national security was his "Deterrence as an Influence Process," which quietly and effectively articulated a Cambridge arms control view that contrasted quietly with the bolder rationalism of threats, mutual assured destruction (MAD), and nuclear deterrence by Thomas Schelling. Pool's analysis viewed MAD with an added understanding of the dangers of instilling fear and the demands of revolutionary movements for respect.

The passion for freedom shaped Pool's life. As a young man, Pool was a devout Trotskyist, and a student firebrand as an undergraduate (although his aggression was verbal). He became disillusioned with this form of Communist revolutionary politics after seeing people's ideals used to take away the freedom for which they had initially fought. His book Technologies of Freedom united his social science expertise and personal values to shape the rapid adoption of the digital age as a gift of freedom and liberation beyond what the conventional ideologies and revolutionary movements of the era of mass communications promised.

=== Simulmatics Corporation ===
De Sola Pool was one of the leaders of the Simulmatics Corporation, a data science firm which used algorithms to target voters and consumers. Jill Lepore wrote extensively about the Simulmatics Corporation in her 2020 book If, Then: How the Simulmatics Corporation Invented the Future.

=== Controversies ===
Pool quietly advised the American government's Voice of America and Radio Free Europe on their programs to evolve Communist regimes and build democratic oppositions in favor of freedom. His work with the Simulmatics Corporation included Department of Defense contracts to predict, understand, and manage Communist insurgencies in Vietnam. He was also involved in Simulmatics' efforts to predict where race riots would occur in the United States. The Simulmatics work was not published and debated based on its scientific evidence. Pool's Vietnam War work for the government made him controversial in the social sciences and on the MIT Campus. Daniel Ellsberg, an anti-war convert and activist, would later say of Pool, "I thought of him as the most corrupt social scientist I had ever met, without question." In the late 1960s, Noam Chomsky viewed him as a New Mandarin, and he sometimes was called a "war criminal." Later, his Technologies of Freedom made him seem more charismatic on the same campus.

Beginning in 1975, Pool protested the growing power of Institutional review boards (IRBs). His first involvement in IRB issues was when an MIT IRB told one of Pool's colleagues he could not interview Boston anti-busing activists, reasoning that his colleague's research could be used against them. Pool believed that much social science work was roughly equivalent to journalism and deserved equal protections against prior restraint.

== Personal life ==
While at the University of Chicago, he met Judith Graham, who became an important researcher in hemophilia. They married in 1938, when she was a sophomore. Their first son, Jonathan, was born in 1942, and son Jeremy followed in 1945. The de Sola Pools divorced in 1953. In 1956 Ithiel married Jean Natalie MacKenzie (1919-2001). From that marriage they had one child, Adam MacKenzie de Sola Pool.

== Legacy ==
Pool died in 1984 from cancer. At that point in his career, he was a member of the Council on Foreign Relations, advising several countries around the world. Pool felt that the world was underestimating the importance of communications and technical change. His greatest legacy was his 1983 book Technologies of Freedom.

The American Political Science Association has established an Ithiel de Sola Pool prize that is awarded every three years. The Salzburg Global Seminar has established a prize lecture in the name of Ithiel de Sola Pool.

=== Contributions to social sciences ===
- Quantitative Analysis - Three Major Advances
- The study of Nazi WWII propaganda and symbols of freedom in speeches of Political leaders.
- Analysis of Political elites = those in power.
- First computer simulation in decision making during crises.

== Selected publications ==
- — (1983). Forecasting the Telephone: A Retrospective Technology Assessment of the Telephone. Norwood, New Jersey: ABLEX Publishing. ISBN 0-89391-048-1. LCCN 82022637. OL 2753518W.
- — (1983). Technologies of Freedom. Cambridge, Mass: Belknap Press of Harvard University Press. ISBN 0-674-87232-0. LCCN 82024498. OL 2753525W.
- — (1990). Technologies without Boundaries: on telecommunications in a global age. Cambridge, Mass: Harvard University Press. ISBN 0674872630. LCCN 90037817. OL 2753524W.
- — (1998). Etheredge, Lloyd S. (ed.). Politics in Wired Nations: Selected Writings of Ithiel de Sola Pool. New Brunswick, New Jersey: Transaction Publishers. ISBN 1-56000-344-8. LCCN 97-51703. OL 2753519W. Includes a selected bibliography of published works.
- The Small World
- The Social Impact of the Telephone
- Humane Politics and Methods of Inquiry: Selected Writings of Ithiel de Sola Pool edited by Lloyd S. Etheredge. Includes L. S. Etheredge, "What's Next? The Intellectual Legacy of Ithiel de Sola Pool."
