= Harriet Wadeson =

American art therapy pioneer

Harriet Claire Wadeson Ph.D., LCSW, ATR-BC, HLM (January 9, 1931 – January 26, 2016) was a pioneer in the art therapy profession, and an author, researcher, and educator, who established and directed the Art Therapy Graduate Program at the University of Illinois at Chicago and the Art Therapy Certificate Program at Northwestern University where she taught until get death.

Wadeson was an Honorary Life Member (HLM) of the American Art Therapy Association, the profession's highest honor, and won numerous awards, including a first prize for art from the Smithsonian Institution, a Distinguished Faculty award from Northwestern University, a first prize for research from the American Art Therapy Association, the Benjamin Rush Bronze Medal Award from the American Psychiatric Association, and a Resolution of Commendation from the Illinois State Legislature. In addition to holding many offices on the American Art Therapy Association Executive Board, she has been Associate Editor of Art Therapy, Journal of the American Art Therapy Association.

== Education, training, and career ==
Wadeson graduated from Cornell University, where she studied psychology. She began taking courses at the Washington School of Psychiatry, American University and Catholic University when she met Hanna Kwiatkowska who opened her eyes to a world of art therapy. Kwiatkowska originated family art therapy and offered to train Wadeson at the National Institute of Mental Health (NIMH). At that time, there were no master's degree programs in art therapy. Wadeson began working at NIMH in 1961 by conducting art therapy with adolescent groups. Her first publication was about this experience. For eight years Wadeson worked with patients with affective disorders, including mania, psychotic depression, and suicide risk. During this time Wadeson was the only female and non-MD on the project's research team. She won the Benjamin Rush Award for Scientific Exhibits from the American Psychiatric Association for her exhibit, "Portraits of Suicide." Subsequently, she worked with people who suffered from schizophrenia and received no medication. After spending thirteen years at NIMH, Wadeson had published twenty-nine articles, primarily in psychiatric journals.

Wadeson began working on her master's degree in psychology and art therapy from Goddard College. She then pursued her Masters of Social Work (MSW) at Catholic University. She was able to graduate in one year from Catholic University due to her large number of publications.

Wadeson left NIMH, expanded her private practice, and began work on her Ph.D. at Union Institute. Her dissertation, "Art Psychotherapy," was one of the first books in the field, and has currently sold 24,000 copies.

In 1978, Wadeson began teaching at the University of Houston, where she became director of its Art Therapy Graduate Program. In 1980, she moved to the University of Illinois at Chicago (UIC). where she directed the Art Therapy Graduate Program for 23 years.

== American Art Therapy Association ==
Wadeson held various positions in the American Art Therapy Association (AATA), including publications chair, newsletter editor, research chair, honors chair, ethics chair, and status of women chair, among others, and has been the associate editor of the Art Therapy Journal of the American Art Therapy Association. Wadeson was awarded the art therapy profession's highest honor in 1992, honorary life membership (HLM) from the American Art Therapy Association.

== Approach ==
Wadeson was known for her eclectic approach to art therapy. She believed it is important for art therapists to have a comprehensive knowledge of various human development and sociological theories to be most effective in working in diverse settings. She stated that an eclectic approach allows the therapist to be open to possibilities and to use methods that best suit individual clients, groups, and communities.
Although she was eclectic, she also described herself as humanistic, existential, and phenomenological. Nevertheless, she believed it is important for art therapists to develop their own approach based on their life experience.

== Presentations ==
In 2012 Wadeson presented on her book "Journaling Cancer in Words and images" at Emporia State University's Art Therapy Discovery Day.

== Publications ==
Wadeson was giving presentations, workshops, and book signings throughout the US and in Europe, until she died, in connection with her most recent book, "Journaling Cancer in Words and Images, Caught in the Clutch of the Crab," and its emphasis on the use of creative self-expression in facing the challenge of living with cancer In addition to 8 books, she published 70 papers in refereed journals and numerous chapters in psychology and art therapy texts. Her books include:

- Art Psychotherapy (John Wiley & sons, 1980)
- Advances in Art Therapy (John Wiley & sons, 1989)
- The Dynamics of Art Therapy (John Wiley & sons, 1987)
- Art Therapy Practice (John Wiley & sons, 2000)
- Art Therapy Research (American Art Therapy Assn., 1992)
- Architects of Art Therapy (Charles C. Thomas, 2006)
- Art Psychotherapy, 2nd Edition (John Wiley & Sons, 2010)
- Journaling Cancer in Words and Images, Caught in the Clutch of the Crab (Charles C. Thomas, 2011)
