= Federation of American Societies for Experimental Biology =

Federation of American Societies for Experimental Biology (FASEB)
- Formation: 1912
- Type: Scientific federation
- Purpose: Biological and biomedical sciences
- Headquarters: Rockville, Maryland, United States
- Members: 22 scientific societies
- Website: www.faseb.org

The Federation of American Societies for Experimental Biology (FASEB), based in Rockville, Maryland, is a non-profit organization of scientific societies in the United States. With a focus on the biological and biomedical sciences, the federation represents scientists in such fields as anatomy, physiology, immunology, biochemistry, molecular biology, toxicology, genetics, and nutrition.

== Description ==
Founded in 1912, FASEB was established to provide a forum for biological and biomedical researchers enabling them to hold educational meetings, develop publications, and disseminate biological research results.

FASEB currently comprises 22 scientific societies. As a federation, FASEB's collective mission is to advance health and well-being by promoting research and education in the biological and biomedical sciences.

To advance its mission, FASEB provides a variety of programs and services to its member societies to support their individual members, including advocating for federal funding for their research, hosting scientific conferences and meetings to share their research findings, publishing scientific journals to promote their research, working to create a diverse and representative workforce in the biological and biomedical sciences, and celebrating researchers’ efforts to advance the biological and biomedical sciences through an awards program.

== Members ==
Membership in FASEB is limited to scientific societies. Societies are either Full or Associate members. Each member society shares a common vision for the advancement of research and education in the biological and biomedical sciences.

Full Members

- American Aging Association
- American Association for Anatomy
- American Association of Immunologists
- American Federation for Medical Research
- American Physiological Society
- American Society for Biochemistry and Molecular Biology
- American Society for Bone and Mineral Research
- American Society for Investigative Pathology
- American Society for Pharmacology and Experimental Therapeutics
- Association of Biomolecular Resource Facilities
- Association for Molecular Pathology
- Endocrine Society
- Genetics Society of America
- The Histochemical Society
- Shock Society
- Society for Developmental Biology
- Society for Glycobiology
- Society for Experimental Biology and Medicine
- Society for Leukocyte Biology
- Society for Redox Biology and Medicine
- Society for the Study of Reproduction

Associate Members

- American Society of Human Genetics

== Publications ==
FASEB publishes two open access research journals:

- FASEB Journal
- FASEB BioAdvances

Both journals are peer-reviewed and cover research in the biological and biomedical sciences at every level of organization: atomic, molecular, cell, tissue, organ, organismic, and population.

FASEB also publishes Washington Update, a bimonthly eNewsletter, which covers news on science policy and regulation, FASEB’s awards, meetings, research highlights, and human interest articles.
