= Hudson Institute of Medical Research =

Australian non-profit organization

- Established: January 2014
- Focus: Medical research
- CEO and director: Elizabeth Hartland
- Faculty: Monash University
- Staff: 450 (in 2016)
- Formerly called: Monash Institute of Medical Research; Prince Henry's Institute of Medical Research
- Address: 27-31 Wright St, Clayton, Victoria, Australia
- Location: Clayton, Melbourne, Victoria, Australia
- Website: hudson.org.au

Hudson Institute of Medical Research is an independent, not-for-profit Australian medical research institute, formed through a merger of Prince Henry's Institute of Medical Research (PHI) and the Monash Institute of Medical Research.

== History ==
Prince Henry's Institute of Medical Research was originally established in 1960 as the Medical Research Centre at Prince Henry's Hospital. Known as Melbourne Homeopathic Hospital from c.1869 to 1934,}} the hospital was renamed after the visit in 1934 by Prince Henry, Duke of Gloucester, who served as the 11th Governor-General of Australia.

The Institute moved from its St Kilda Road premises during the amalgamation of Prince Henry's Hospital, Queen Victoria Memorial Hospital, and Moorabbin Hospital in 1987, becoming the Monash Medical Centre in 1992. PHI was incorporated in 1990, and was regarded as the leading endocrinology research institute in Australia. Prince Henry's Hospital was demolished in 1994.

In January 2014, the Hudson Institute of Medical Research was established by merging the Monash Institute of Medical Research and Prince Henry's Institute of Medical Research (PHI). PHI was an independent not-for-profit medical research institute based at the Monash Medical Centre in Melbourne, Victoria.

Hudson Institute of Medical Research was named in honour of the Bryan Hudson, the founding professor of medicine at Monash University and first director of the Prince Henry's Hospital Medical Research Centre, which later became Prince Henry's Institute of Medical Research. Hudson was one of Australia's leading endocrinologists, and a renowned physician-scientist responsible for early work on the male reproductive hormone, inhibin.

== Description and organisation ==
The Hudson Institute of Medical Research is an independent, not-for-profit medical research institute, based in the Melbourne suburb of Clayton in Victoria hosting approximately 450 researchers, postgraduate students, and support staff. Its scientists research five areas of medical need: inflammation; reproductive health and pregnancy; infant and child health; cancer; and hormones and health. The institute's purpose is to do research in order to cure diseases.

As of August 2026 the director and CEO is microbiologist and immunologist Elizabeth Hartland.

The institute is partnered with Monash University and Monash Health, and is co-located with both organisations at the Monash Health Translation Precinct in Clayton.

Hudson Institute of Medical Research is organised into five specialist research centres:

- Centre for Innate Immunity and Infectious Diseases
- Centre for Reproductive Health
- The Ritchie Centre
- Centre for Cancer Research
- Centre for Endocrinology and Metabolism

== Research ==
Hudson Institute scientists examine:

- The body's innate immune responses and their role in cancer, autoimmune diseases and inflammation; infectious diseases including HIV, herpes and influenza.
- Fetal and neonatal health from conception to a baby's first breath of life to prevent and treat adverse events such as birth asphyxia, premature lung disease and ectopic pregnancy.
- The human placenta, embryo implantation and a woman's endometrium to improve reproduction and development and better treat and diagnose women's health conditions such as endometriosis.
- The molecular, genetic, endocrine and mitochondrial processes underlying cancer tumour development to identify and develop more effective cancer diagnostics and treatments.

== Education ==
The institute has a large student population, predominantly enrolled through Monash University, and hosts more than 170 postgraduate (Honours, Masters, BmedSci, and PhD) students each year.

== Facilities ==
The federally-funded Monash Health Translation Precinct Translational Research Facility (TRF) was officially opened by then Australian Health Minister Sussan Ley MP in March 2016. The facility contains research laboratory space, a platform technologies floor and a dedicated clinical trials centre, with eight beds and 21 chairs for the purpose of translating research into patient treatments.

The institute's scientists and students have access to the MHTP Technology Platforms, which contain the following capabilities:

- Medical Genomics
- Mass Spectrometry
- Flow Cytometry
- Histology
- Micro Imaging
- Bioinformatics
- Cell Therapies
- Monash Biobank
- Immunoassay Facility

== See also ==
- Health in Australia
