= Sam Prince (restaurateur) =

Australian entrepreneur (born 1983)

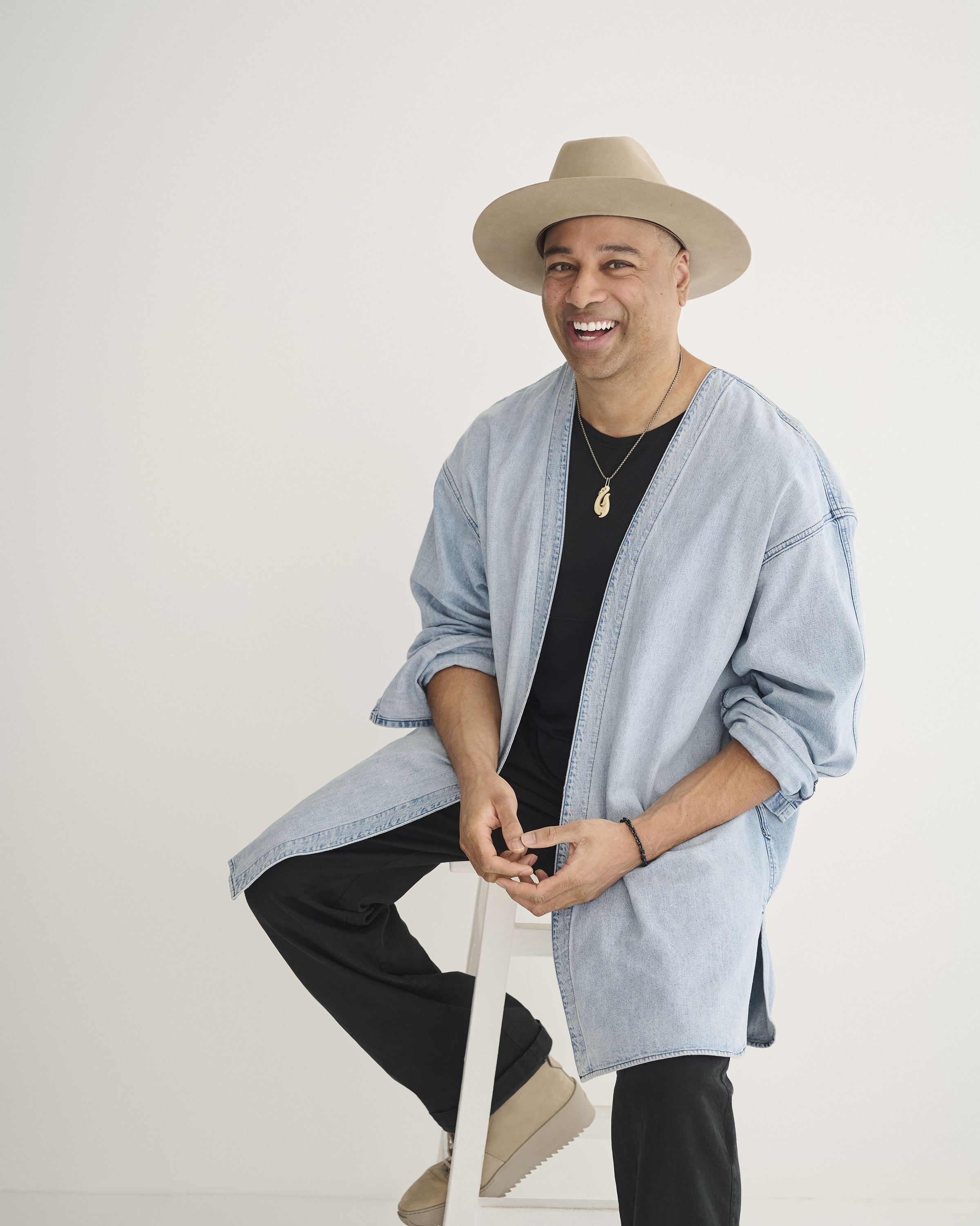
- Sam Prince in 2023
- Born: 27 November 1983 (age 42); Dundee, Scotland
- Education: Australian National University, Monash University
- Occupations: Restauranteur, philanthropist
- Years active: 2004–present
- Known for: Founder of Zambrero

Sam Prince (born 27 November 1983) is an Australian restaurateur.

== Life and career ==
Prince was born in Dundee, Scotland, and moved with his family to Australia in 1986. His parents are from Sri Lanka. He attended St Edmund's College and Lake Ginninderra College, before studying medicine at Monash University.

In 2005, Prince opened a Mexican restaurant in his hometown of Canberra. The Zambrero chain now has over 200 outlets, most of which are in Australia.

Prince also owns Kid Kyoto in Sydney, the Shine+ beverage company and Next Practice.

== Personal life ==
Prince resides in Miami, Florida.

=== Net worth ===
As of May 2025, Prince’s net worth was reported at A$1.97 billion by the Financial Review in the 2025 Rich List. In 2023, Forbes assessed Prince's net worth at A$1.56 billion.

Year	Financial Review Rich List		Forbes Australia's 50 Richest	
Year	Rank	Net worth (A$)	Rank	Net worth (US$)
2023		$1.55 billion		$1.56 billion
2024		$1.60 billion ▲		
2025	87	$1.97 billion ▲		

Legend
Icon	Description
Steady	Has not changed from the previous year
▲	Has increased from the previous year
▼	Has decreased from the previous year

=== Awards and honours ===
Prince was named EY National and Regional Social Entrepreneur of the Year in 2018. In 2012, Prince was awarded the ACT Australian of the Year for his Zambrero-related philanthropy. In 2009, Prince received the Most Outstanding Young Person of the World award by the Junior Chambers International.
