= Society for the Study of Reproduction =

Organization for the study of reproduction

- Founded: 1967
- Type: Not-for-Profit Organization
- Purpose: Reproduction research
- Location: United States of America
- Website: www.ssr.org

The Society for the Study of Reproduction (SSR) is an international not-for-profit professional society for scientists working in the fields of reproduction, fertility and development. The Society focuses on reproduction in both people and animals, including research from the areas of medicine, agriculture and basic biology. It is credited with being the first organization to focus on "the full panoply of reproductive phenomena" and is listed as a major professional association publishing reproductive research and a major organization in American animal agriculture. The Society includes members from at least 50 countries worldwide. The official peer-reviewed scientific journal for SSR is Biology of Reproduction.

== History ==
The Society for the Study of Reproduction was formed in June 1967, in an organizational meeting held during the Annual Meeting of the American Society of Animal Science at the University of Illinois, Urbana. The first president of the Society was Robert M. Melampy. He organized SSR's first annual meeting, which was held in August 1968 at Vanderbilt University, Nashville, Tennessee. The Society's journal Biology of Reproduction first appeared in 1969. The Society's articles of incorporation as a nonprofit organization were filed in the state of Illinois in 1974.

== Activities ==
As of 2021, the Society's president was Troy L. Ott, Professor of Reproductive Physiology at Pennsylvania State University's Department of Animal Science. The first woman to be president of SSR was Neena Schwartz, who held the office from 1977 to 1978. Schwartz credits SSR as being more willing than older scientific societies to admit women as participants in its administration, board and program planning. She contrasts SSR favorably with the American Physiological Society and Endocrine Society, of all of which she was a member.

The Society recognizes outstanding contributions in the field of reproduction through a number of awards, including the Carl G. Hartman Award, the SSR Research Award, SSR Jansen Distinguished Leadership and Service Award, the Fuller W. Bazer SSR International Scientist Award, the Virendra B. Mahesh New Investigator Award, and the SSR Trainee Mentoring Award as well as additional funding for future scientists.
