= List of members of the National Academy of Sciences (plant, soil and microbial sciences) =

This list is a subsection of the List of members of the National Academy of Sciences, which includes members and international members of the United States National Academy of Sciences, living and deceased, each affiliated with one of the academy's disciplinary sections. Members are listed under their primary section, and each entry gives the person's name, primary institution, and election year. For deceased members, the year of death is noted.

== Plant, soil, and microbial sciences ==
| Name | Institution | Year |
|---|---|---|
| Elizabeth Ainsworth | United States Department of Agriculture | 2020 |
| Richard Amasino | University of Wisconsin–Madison | 2006 |
| Charles Arntzen | Arizona State University | 1983 |
| John D. Axtell (died 2000) | Purdue University | 1982 |
| Julia Bailey-Serres | University of California, Riverside | 2016 |
| Stanley Barber (died 2002) | Purdue University | 1987 |
| Alice Barkan | University of Oregon | 2020 |
| Roger Beachy | Donald Danforth Plant Science Center | 1997 |
| Jeffrey Bennetzen | University of Georgia | 2004 |
| James Birchler | University of Georgia | 2011 |
| Norman Borlaug (died 2009) | International Maize and Wheat Improvement Center | 1968 |
| John Boyer | University of Delaware | 1990 |
| Myron Brakke (died 2007) | University of Nebraska–Lincoln | 1974 |
| John Bremner (died 2007) | Iowa State University | 1984 |
| Steven P. Briggs | University of California, San Diego | 2000 |
| Winston Brill | Winston J. Brill and Associates | 1989 |
| William L. Brown (died 1991) | Pioneer Hi-Bred International, Inc. | 1980 |
| George Bruening (died 2023) | University of California, Davis | 1992 |
| Edward Buckler | Cornell University | 2014 |
| C. Robin Buell | University of Georgia | 2025 |
| Martin Bukovac (died 2025 | Michigan State University | 1983 |
| Robert H. Burris (died 2010) | University of Wisconsin–Madison | 1961 |
| Glenn Burton (died 2005) | U.S. Department of Agriculture | 1975 |
| James C. Carrington | Donald Danforth Plant Science Center | 2008 |
| Vicki Chandler | University of Arizona | 2002 |
| Te-Tzu Chang (died 2006) | International Rice Research Institute | 1994 |
| Xuemei Chen | Peking University | 2013 |
| Alice Y. Cheung | University of Massachusetts Amherst | 2025 |
| Mary-Dell Chilton | Syngenta | 1985 |
| Adrienne Clarke | University of Melbourne | 1993 |
| C. Clark Cockerham (died 1996) | North Carolina State University | 1974 |
| Luca Comai | University of California, Davis | 2023 |
| R. James Cook | Washington State University | 1993 |
| George Coupland | Max Planck Institute for Plant Breeding Research | 2012 |
| Sean Cutler | University of California, Riverside | 2018 |
| J. M. Daly (died 1993) | University of Nebraska–Lincoln | 1984 |
| Robert E. Davis (died 2019) | Agricultural Research Service | 2005 |
| C. T. de Wit (died 1993) | Wageningen Agricultural University | 1992 |
| Dean DellaPenna | Michigan State University | 2021 |
| Deborah Delmer | Rockefeller Foundation | 2004 |
| Elizabeth S. Dennis | University of Technology Sydney | 2021 |
| Theodor Diener (died 2023) | University of Maryland, College Park | 1977 |
| Savithramma Dinesh-Kumar | University of California, Davis | 2024 |
| Richard Dixon (biologist) | University of North Texas | 2007 |
| Xinnian Dong | Duke University | 2012 |
| Hugo K. Dooner | Rutgers University | 2007 |
| Jorge Dubcovsky | University of California, Davis | 2013 |
| Donald Duvick (died 2006) | Iowa State University | 2002 |
| Robert L. Fischer | University of California, Berkeley | 2009 |
| Otto H. Frankel (died 1998) | Commonwealth Scientific and Industrial Research Organization | 1988 |
| Michael Freeling | University of California, Berkeley | 1994 |
| Wolf Frommer | Heinrich Heine University Düsseldorf | 2024 |
| David T. Gibson (died 2014) | University of Iowa | 2005 |
| James Giovannoni | Agricultural Research Service | 2016 |
| Robert Glen (died 1991) | Canadian Department of Agriculture | 1967 |
| Robert Goldberg (died 2025) | University of California, Los Angeles | 2001 |
| Major M. Goodman (died 2026) | North Carolina State University | 1986 |
| Mary Lou Guerinot | Dartmouth College | 2016 |
| Sarah Hake | United States Department of Agriculture | 2009 |
| Arnel Hallauer | Iowa State University | 1989 |
| Andrew D. Hanson (died 2025) | University of Florida | 2024 |
| Jack Harlan (died 1998) | University of Illinois Urbana-Champaign | 1972 |
| Bryan Harrison | Scottish Crop Research Institute | 1998 |
| Maria Harrison | Boyce Thompson Institute for Plant Research | 2019 |
| Sheng Yang He | Duke University | 2015 |
| Charles R. Henderson (died 1989) | Cornell University | 1985 |
| George H. Hepting (died 1988) | North Carolina State University | 1969 |
| Luis Herrera-Estrella | Texas Tech University | 2003 |
| Takayoshi Higuchi (died 2017) | Kyoto University | 1991 |
| James G. Horsfall (died 1995) | Connecticut Agricultural Experiment Station | 1953 |
| Carl Barton Huffaker (died 1995) | University of California, Berkeley | 1982 |
| Roger W. Innes | Indiana University Bloomington | 2025 |
| Marion L. Jackson (died 2002) | University of Wisconsin-Madison | 1986 |
| Steven Jacobsen | University of California, Los Angeles | 2011 |
| Jonathan D. G. Jones | University of East Anglia | 2015 |
| Regine Kahmann | Max Planck Institute for Terrestrial Microbiology | 2021 |
| Kenneth Keegstra | Michigan State University | 2014 |
| Noel T. Keen (died 2002) | University of California, Riverside | 1997 |
| Arthur Kelman (died 2009) | North Carolina State University | 1976 |
| Allen Kerr (died 2023) | University of Adelaide | 1991 |
| Gurdev Khush | University of California, Davis | 1989 |
| T. Kent Kirk (died 2025) | University of Wisconsin–Madison | 1988 |
| Todd Klaenhammer (died 2021) | North Carolina State University | 2001 |
| Harry Klee | University of Florida | 2012 |
| Tsune Kosuge (died 1988) | University of California, Davis | 1988 |
| Jane A. Langdale | University of Oxford | 2019 |
| Brian Larkins (died 2025) | University of Arizona | 1996 |
| Jan E. Leach | Colorado State University | 2021 |
| Johannes Lehmann | Cornell University | 2023 |
| Charles S. Levings (died 2017) | North Carolina State University | 1987 |
| Steven Lindow | University of California, Berkeley | 1999 |
| Zachary Lippman | Cold Spring Harbor Laboratory | 2021 |
| David Lobell | Stanford University | 2023 |
| Philip F. Low (died 1997) | Purdue University | 1992 |
| Paul C. Mangelsdorf (died 1989) | Harvard University | 1945 |
| Walter F. O. Marasas (died 2012) | South African Medical Research Council | 2007 |
| Gregory B. Martin | Boyce Thompson Institute for Plant Research | 2022 |
| Susan McCouch | Cornell University | 2018 |
| Blake C. Meyers | University of California, Davis | 2022 |
| Richard W. Michelmore | University of California, Davis | 2024 |
| Oliver E. Nelson Jr. (died 2001) | University of Wisconsin–Madison | 1972 |
| Eugene Nester | University of Washington | 1994 |
| William Ogren (died 2025) | U.S. Department of Agriculture | 1986 |
| Donald R. Ort | University of Illinois Urbana-Champaign | 2017 |
| Anne E. Osbourn | John Innes Centre | 2022 |
| Jane E. Parker | Max Planck Institute for Plant Breeding Research | 2023 |
| Uta Paszkowski | University of Cambridge | 2025 |
| Stanley J. Peloquin (died 2008) | University of Wisconsin–Madison | 1984 |
| Ronald L. Phillips (died 2023) | University of Minnesota, Minneapolis | 1991 |
| Craig S. Pikaard | Indiana University | 2017 |
| Charles M. Rick (died 2002) | University of California, Davis | 1967 |
| Ralph Riley (died 1999) | Agricultural and Food Research Council | 1982 |
| Pamela Ronald | University of California, Davis | 2019 |
| Richard Evans Schultes (died 2001) | Harvard University | 1971 |
| Paul Schulze-Lefert | Max Planck Institute for Plant Breeding Research | 2010 |
| Kate Scow | University of California, Davis | 2022 |
| Ernest Robert Sears (died 1991) | University of Missouri | 1964 |
| Ronald Sederoff | North Carolina State University | 1995 |
| Luis Sequeira (died 2021) | University of Wisconsin–Madison | 1980 |
| Robert J. Shepherd (died 2025) | University of Kentucky | 1988 |
| Kazuo Shinozaki | RIKEN | 2020 |
| George F. Sprague (died 1998) | University of Illinois Chicago | 1968 |
| Brian Staskawicz | University of California, Berkeley | 1998 |
| Stanley Stephens (died 1986) | North Carolina State University | 1967 |
| M. S. Swaminathan (died 2023) | Indian Council of Agricultural Research | 1977 |
| Champ B. Tanner (died 1990) | University of Wisconsin–Madison | 1981 |
| Michael Thomashow | Michigan State University | 2003 |
| Koichiro Tsunewaki (died 2022) | Fukui Prefectural University | 1996 |
| Barbara Valent | Kansas State University | 2020 |
| James Van Etten | University of Nebraska–Lincoln | 2003 |
| Elizabeth Vierling | University of Massachusetts Amherst | 2023 |
| Julia A. Vorholt | ETH Zurich | 2024 |
| Daniel Voytas | University of Minnesota | 2019 |
| Cecil Wadleigh (died 1997) | United States Department of Agriculture | 1973 |
| Paul Edward Waggoner (died 2022) | Connecticut Agricultural Experiment Station | 1978 |
| John Charles Walker (died 1994) | University of Wisconsin–Madison | 1945 |
| Susan Wessler | University of California, Riverside | 1998 |
| Yasuyuki Yamada | Nara Institute of Science and Technology | 1999 |
| Martin Yanofsky | University of California, San Diego | 2008 |
| Dani Zamir | The Hebrew University of Jerusalem | 2023 |
| George A. Zentmyer (died 2003) | University of California, Riverside | 1979 |
| Qifa Zhang | Huazhong Agricultural University | 2007 |
| Jian-Kang Zhu | Southern University of Science and Technology | 2010 |
