= Stanley Stephens =

Stanley Stephens or Stevens may refer to:

- Stanley G. Stephens (geneticist) (1911–1986), British-American plant geneticist and National Academy of Sciences member
- Stan Stephens (1929–2021), American politician
- Stanley Stephens (Australian politician) (1913–1986), member of the New South Wales Legislative Assembly
- Stanley Stephens (cricketer) (1883–1965), Australian cricketer
- Stanley Smith Stevens (1906–1973), American psychologist
