= Zachary Lippman =

American plant biologist

Zachary B. Lippman
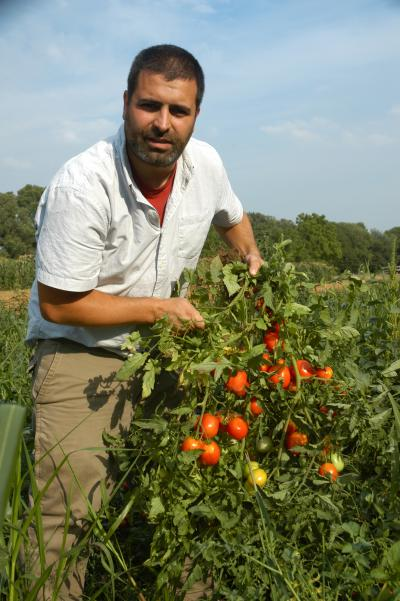
- Born: 1978 (age 47–48)
- Education: Cornell University, School of Biological Sciences at Cold Spring Harbor Laboratory
- Spouse: Shira Golan
- Awards: MacArthur fellow
- Scientific career
- Fields: Plant biology
- Thesis: Transposons, heterochromatin, and epigenetic landscapes in Arabidopsis thaliana (2004)
- Doctoral advisor: Robert A. Martienssen
- Website: lippmanlab.cshl.edu

Zachary B. Lippman (born 1978) is an American plant biologist and the Jacob Goldfield Professor of Genetics at Cold Spring Harbor Laboratory, a Howard Hughes Medical Institute Investigator and a member of the National Academy of Sciences. Lippman has used gene editing technology to investigate the control of fruit production in various crops. In 2019 he was awarded a MacArthur Fellowship and in 2020 he received the National Academy of Sciences Prize in Food and Agriculture Sciences.

== Early life and education ==
Lippman worked on a farm in Milford, Connecticut growing up where he grew giant pumpkins. He attended Cornell University as an undergraduate, graduating in 2000. During his time as an undergraduate he worked with Steven D. Tanksley studying tomatoes. He joined the research group of Robert A. Martienssen at Cold Spring Harbor Laboratory where he studied the role of the DDM1 gene in methylation of transposons and how this process can alter the expression of other nearby genes. After completing his PhD in 2004, Lippman was a postdoc with Dani Zamir at Hebrew University of Jerusalem where he studied genes controlling branching in tomatoes. Lippman was hired as a principal investigator at Cold Spring Harbor in 2008.

== Research ==
Lippman's research group, collaborating with Joyce Van Eck at the Boyce Thompson Institute used genome editing to improve domestication traits in the wild ground cherry, Physalis pruinosa. They targeted three genes known to be important in the domestication of tomato. The first gene made plants more compact and caused them to produce fruit in clusters rather than individually. The second gene increased the number of fruit produced per unit of stem. The final of the three genes increased the size of the fruit by increasing the number of seed compartments inside of each fruit.

== Awards ==
- Howard Hughes Medical Institute Investigator (2018)
- MacArthur Fellowship, commonly referred to as a "Genius grant" (2019).
- National Academy of Sciences, Prize in Food and Agricultural Sciences (2020).
- Elected a member of the National Academy of Sciences (NAS) in 2021.
