= Robert Goldberg =

Robert Goldberg may refer to:

- Robert L. Goldberg, attorney in Rostker v. Goldberg, a decision of the United States Supreme Court
- Robert Alan Goldberg (born 1949), American historian
- Robert P. Goldberg (1944–1994), American computer scientist
- Robert D. Goldberg (born 1951), American politician, member of the Rhode Island Senate
- Robert Goldberg (plant biologist) (1944-2025), American plant molecular biologist
