= Eric Conn =

Eric Conn may refer to:

- Eric Conn (biochemist) (1923–2017), American biochemist
- Eric C. Conn (born 1960), American former attorney and convicted felon
