= UC Riverside Botanic Gardens =

Botanical gardens in Riverside, California

University of California, Riverside Botanic Gardens
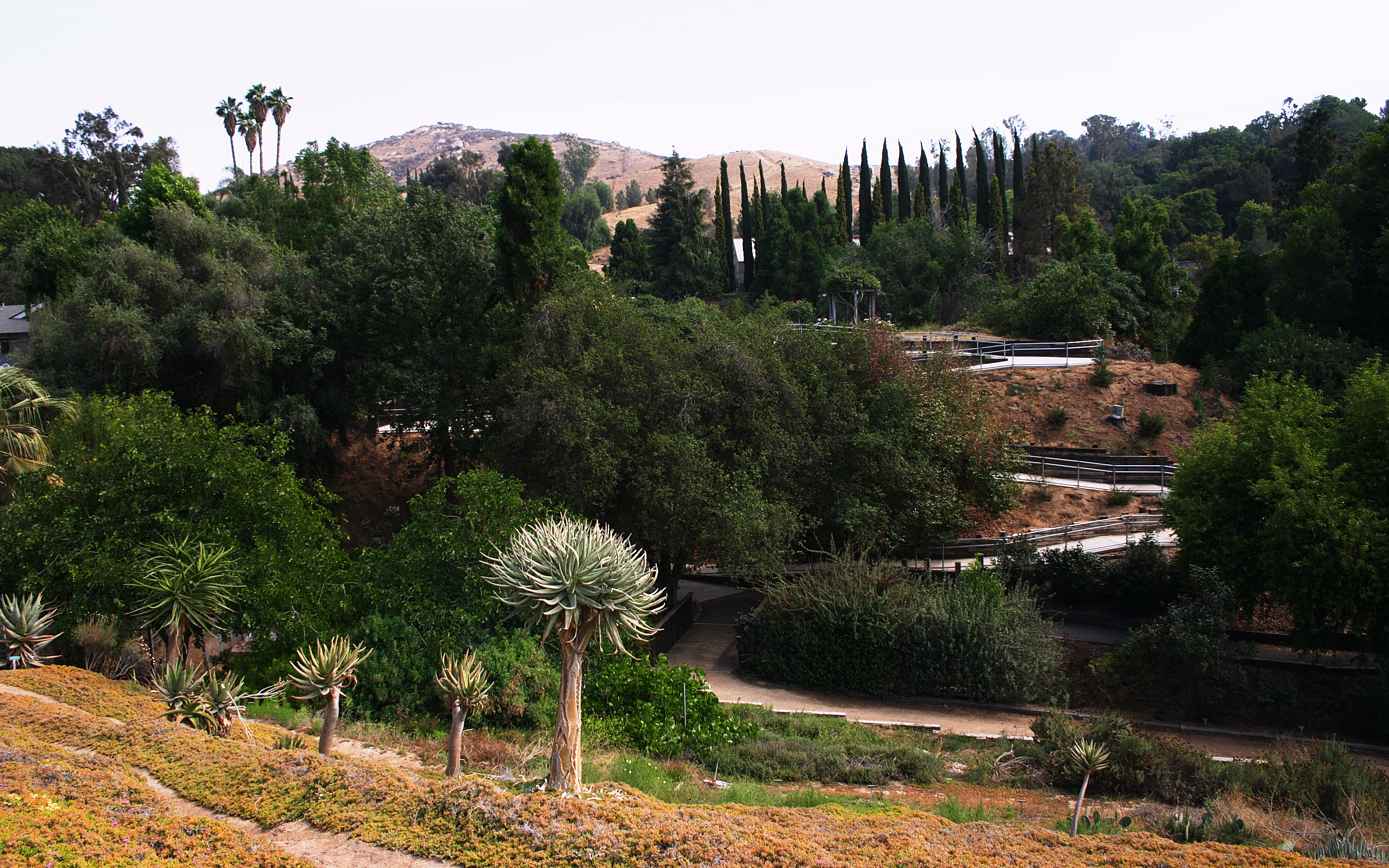
- UCR Botanic Gardens
- Interactive map of University of California, Riverside Botanic Gardens
- Type: Botanical
- Location: Riverside, California, U.S.
- Coordinates: 33.9754°N 117.3396°W
- Area: 40 acres (16 hectares)
- Opened: 1963
- Species: 3,500
- Collections: Mediterranean climates, American southwest
- Website: gardens.ucr.edu

The University of California, Riverside, Botanic Gardens are 40 acres (16.2 ha) of botanical gardens containing more than 3,500 plant species from around the world. The Gardens are located in the eastern foothills of the Box Springs Mountain on the University of California, Riverside campus in Riverside, California, US. Over four miles (6 km) of trails wind through many microclimates and hilly terrain.

== Composition ==
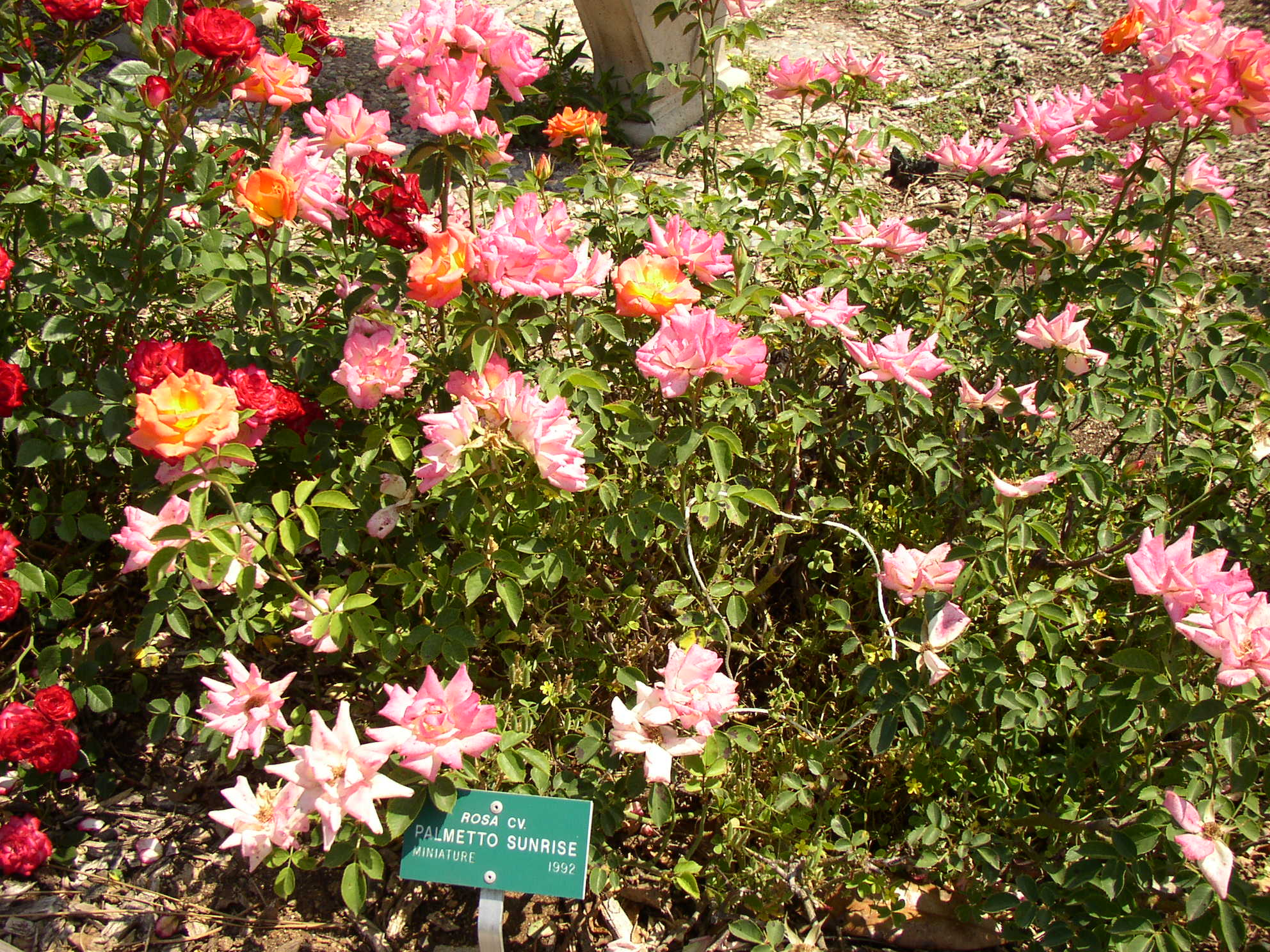
Palmetto Sunrise flowers at the gardens

The UCR Botanic Gardens are actually composed of two parts: the overall UCR campus and the 40-acre (160,000 m^{2}) botanical gardens. The landscaped area around the buildings on campus demonstrates a wide variety of plants adapted to the arid inland area of Southern California. The Gardens were established primarily for teaching purposes and serve to provide plant materials for courses such as anthropology, art, biology, ecology, entomology, morphology, ornamental horticulture, plant pathology, photography, and taxonomy. The Gardens also provide plant materials for research and for exhibiting species from all parts of the world.

A support organization, Friends of the UCR Botanic Gardens, was established in 1980. A popular bi-annual Botanic Gardens Plant Sale provides greater visibility and community support for the gardens.

=== Collections organized by species ===
- Alder Canyon – California native riparian trees, including azaleas, camellias, hydrangeas and ferns
- Rose Gardens – Over 300 selections – species roses, heritage varieties, miniatures, floribundas, grandifloras and Hybrid Teas
- Herb Garden – Aromatic, culinary, dye and medicinal herbs
- Cactus Garden – Hundreds of cacti, ocotillos, agaves, yuccas, etc.
- Iris Garden – More than 150 named bearded iris cultivars
- Lilac Lane – True lilacs
- Subtropical Fruit Orchard – Citrus, guavas, sapotes, avocados, macadamia nuts and other subtropical fruit trees

=== Collections organized by geographical origin ===
- South African Garden – Aloes, ice plants, naked ladies, and South African wildflowers
- Southwest Deserts Section – Extensive collection of Southwest U.S. desert plants with emphasis on those native to the Mojave and Colorado Deserts
- Sierra Foothills Section – Chaparral and Foothill Pine Woodland plants such as foothill pine, mountain mahogany, California buckeye, fremontia, sumacs and yuccas
- Boysie Day Baja California Garden – Boojum tree, palo adán, elephant tree, lomboy, and slipper plant
- Australian Section – Eucalyptus, bottlebrushes, melaleucas, grevilleas, acacias, etc.
- Temperate Deciduous Forest – A selection of trees and shrubs from temperate China and the Eastern U.S. including paper mulberry, dawn redwood, golden rain tree, sweetgum (Liquidambar), and maples.
- The pond – A resemblance of the Florida Everglades. Extensive collection of animals, such as red-eared sliders to koi.

== Wild animals ==
The gardens are home to 195 bird species, ranging from kites, mallards, falcons and kestrels to quail, plovers, swallows, starlings and woodpeckers. Mammalian residents include California ground squirrels, Audubon cottontails, kangaroo rats, gophers, coyotes, gray foxes, opossums, pack rats, skunks and bobcats. Reptiles, including turtles, lizards of many kinds, and snakes, ranging from gopher snakes to the venomous rattlers, also populate the gardens. Amphibian residents include bullfrogs, western toads, salamanders and Pacific Tree Frog. Fishes include koi and carp.

== See also ==
- List of botanical gardens in the United States
