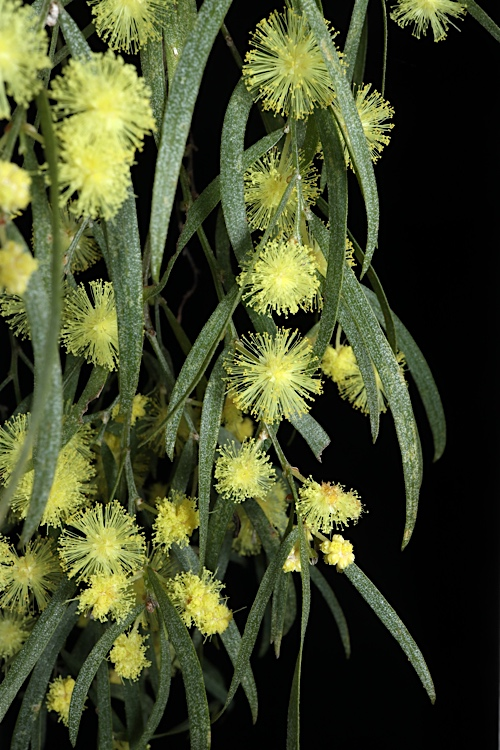
- In the Australian National Botanic Gardens

Scientific classification
- Kingdom: Plantae
- Clade: Tracheophytes
- Clade: Angiosperms
- Clade: Eudicots
- Clade: Rosids
- Order: Fabales
- Family: Fabaceae
- Subfamily: Caesalpinioideae
- Clade: Mimosoid clade
- Genus: Acacia
- Species: A. conniana

Binomial name
- Acacia conniana Maslin
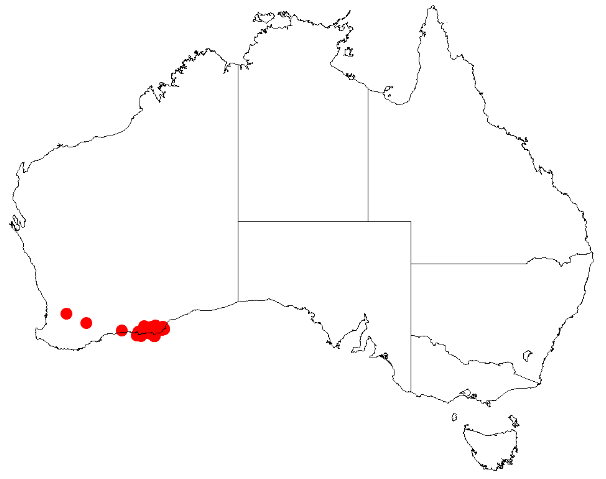
- Occurrence data from AVH

Synonyms
- Acacia acuminata var. latifolia Benth.; Acacia cognata Maiden and Blakely nom. illeg.; Racosperma connianum (Maslin) Pedley

= Acacia conniana =

Species of legume

Acacia conniana is a species of flowering plant in the family Fabaceae and is endemic to the south coast of Western Australia. It is a dense, bushy, glabrous shrub or tree with fissured bark, ascending or erect, thinly leathery phyllodes, dense spikes of golden yellow flowers and linear, leathery or thinly crust-like pods.

== Description ==
Acacia conniana is a dense, bushy, glabrous shrub or tree that typically grows to a height of 2–6 m (6 ft 7 in – 19 ft 8 in) and has fissured, dark grey or reddish brown bark at the base of the main trunk. Its phyllodes are ascending to erect, 70–160 mm (2.8–6.3 in) long, 3–12 mm (0.12–0.47 in) wide, thinly leathery and green, with a markedly turned down tip and a prominent midvein. The flowers are golden yellow and densely arranged in spikes on short branchlets 10–25 mm (0.39–0.98 in) long on peduncles 4–10 mm (0.16–0.39 in) long. Flowering occurs from September to November and the pods are linear, glabrous, leathery to thinly crust-like, up to 100 mm (3.9 in) long and 3–4 mm (0.12–0.16 in) wide, the seeds up to 5 mm (0.20 in) long.

== Taxonomy ==
This species was first described in 1927 by Joseph Maiden and William Blakely who gave it the name Acacia cognata in the Journal of the Royal Society of Western Australia from a specimen collected near Israelite Bay, but the name was illegitimate because the name had already been used by Karel Domin for a different taxon. In 1984 Bruce Maslin described A. conniana in the journal Nuytsia based on Maiden and Blakely's original description. The specific epithet (conniana) honours Eric Conn, in recognition of his biochemical work on cyanogenesis in plants, including Acacia.

== Distribution and habitat ==
This species of wattle is native to an area along the south coast of the Western Australia from around the east of Esperance at Cape Le Grand to east of Cape Arid National Park and around Israelite Bay where it is found amongst granite outcrops growing in shallow skeletal soils with isolated populations around Pingelly, in the Avon Wheatbelt, Esperance Plains and Mallee bioregions. It is also found on some islands on the Recherche Archipelago including Middle Island and Mondrain Island.

== Conservation status ==
Acacia conniana is listed as "not threatened" by the Government of Western Australia Department of Biodiversity, Conservation and Attractions,

== See also ==
- List of Acacia species
