= James E. Womack =

American biologist

- Education: Abilene Christian University; Oregon State University
- Scientific career
- Fields: Biology
- Workplaces: Abilene Christian University; Texas A&M University

James E. Womack (March 30, 1941 – August 13, 2023) was an American biologist and a professor at Texas A&M University.

== Birth and education ==
James E. Womack was born on March 30, 1941, in the United States. He graduated with a BS in Mathematics Ed from Abilene Christian University in 1964. After completing his BS, he went to Oregon State University and completed his PhD in Genetics in 1968.

== Academic career ==
After completing his PhD, he became an assistant professor of Biology at Abilene Christian University. He was an assistant professor of Biology from 1968 to 1971 and an associate professor of Biology from 1971 to 1973 at Abilene Christian University. Since 1973, he has been a professor at Texas A&M University.

== Research ==
James E. Womack is known for conducting pioneering research in the cattle genome. He was responsible for the development of a whole genome cattle-hamster radiation hybrid (RH) panel. This work fueled a new thrust in cattle genomics and comparative gene mapping. RH mapping is an effective tool for building ordered maps of conserved sequences, derived from genes, thus integrating linkage and physical maps of mammalian chromosomes.

He has taken special interest in assisting the careers of young scientists, particularly those in developing countries. Many of his students have gone on to positions of international leadership in animal genomics.

== Awards and honors ==
James E. Womack has received several awards and honours for his research. In 1993, he was awarded the CIBA Prize for Research in Animal Health. In 1999, he was elected to the National Academy of Sciences. In 2001, he was awarded the Wolf Prize in Agriculture along with Roger N. Beachy of the Danforth Plant Science Center "for the use of recombinant DNA technology, to revolutionize plant and animal sciences, paving the way for applications to neighboring fields".
