= The Plant Cell =

- Discipline: Plant biology
- Language: English
- Edited by: Pablo Manavella

Publication details
- History: 1989–present
- Publisher: American Society of Plant Biologists (United States)
- Frequency: Monthly
- Impact factor: 11.6 (2024)

Standard abbreviations
- ISO 4: Plant Cell

Indexing
- ISSN: 1040-4651 (print); 1532-298X (web)
- LCCN: 89646546
- JSTOR: 10404651
- OCLC no.: 1065263829

Links
- Journal homepage; Current issue

The Plant Cell is a monthly peer-reviewed scientific journal of plant sciences, especially the areas of cell and molecular biology, genetics, development, and evolution. It is published by the American Society of Plant Biologists. The editor-in-chief appointed for a term of 2025 to 2029 is Pablo Manavella (Institute of Subtropical and Mediterranean Horticulture "La Mayora"). The journal was established in 1989, with Robert (Bob) Goldberg (University of California, Los Angeles) as the founding editor-in-chief.

According to Clarivate, the journal has a 2024 impact factor of 11.6.

== History ==
The Plant Cell was established by the American Society of Plant Biologists in 1989 as a peer-reviewed journal focused on plant cellular and molecular biology. Planning for the journal began in the mid-1980s, and it was formally approved by the society in 1987. According to founding editor Robert B. Goldberg, the journal was created to provide a dedicated venue for mechanistic studies in plant biology during a period of rapid growth in molecular and genetic approaches. The first issue was published in January 1989. In October 2009, the journal introduced Teaching Tools in Plant Biology, an online educational resource to support instruction in plant biology courses.

== Editors ==
The following people are or have been editors-in-chief:

- 1989–1994: Robert Goldberg
- 1995–1999: Brian A. Larkins
- 2000–2004: Ralph Quatrano
- 2004–2008: Rich Jorgensen
- 2008–2014: Cathie Martin
- 2015–2019: Sabeeha Merchant
- 2020–2024: Blake Meyers
- 2025–present: Pablo Manavella
