= Tsune Kosuge =

American plant pathologist and biochemist

Tsune Kosuge

Tsune Kosuge (November 28, 1925 – March 13, 1988) was an American plant pathologist and plant biochemist who researched plant–microbe interactions. He was particularly known for his work on bacterial-synthesized plant hormones in plant tumors. He was a professor in the department of plant pathology at the University of California, Davis, from 1971 until his death, serving as departmental chair (1974–80).

== Education and career ==
Kosuge was born in Merino, Colorado in 1925. During the Second World War, he served in Italy for two years and then spent a year farming. From 1948, he attended Colorado State University and the University of Colorado Boulder, gaining a BS in horticulture from the latter (1952), and then gained an MS in plant pathology from Washington State University (1955). His PhD in comparative biochemistry was from the University of California, Berkeley (1959); his supervisor was Eric Conn. In 1961, he joined the plant pathology department at the University of California, Davis, where he remained until his death, becoming a professor in 1971 and serving as departmental chair in 1974–80.

Kosuge was an elected fellow of the American Phytopathological Society (1976) and was elected as member to the National Academy of Sciences posthumously in 1988. He was the co-editor of six books, including Plant–Microbe Interactions with Eugene Nester. He also served as program officer to the Biological Stress Program (1978–79) and chief scientist (1983–84) of the United States Department of Agriculture's Competitive Research Grants Office.

== Research ==
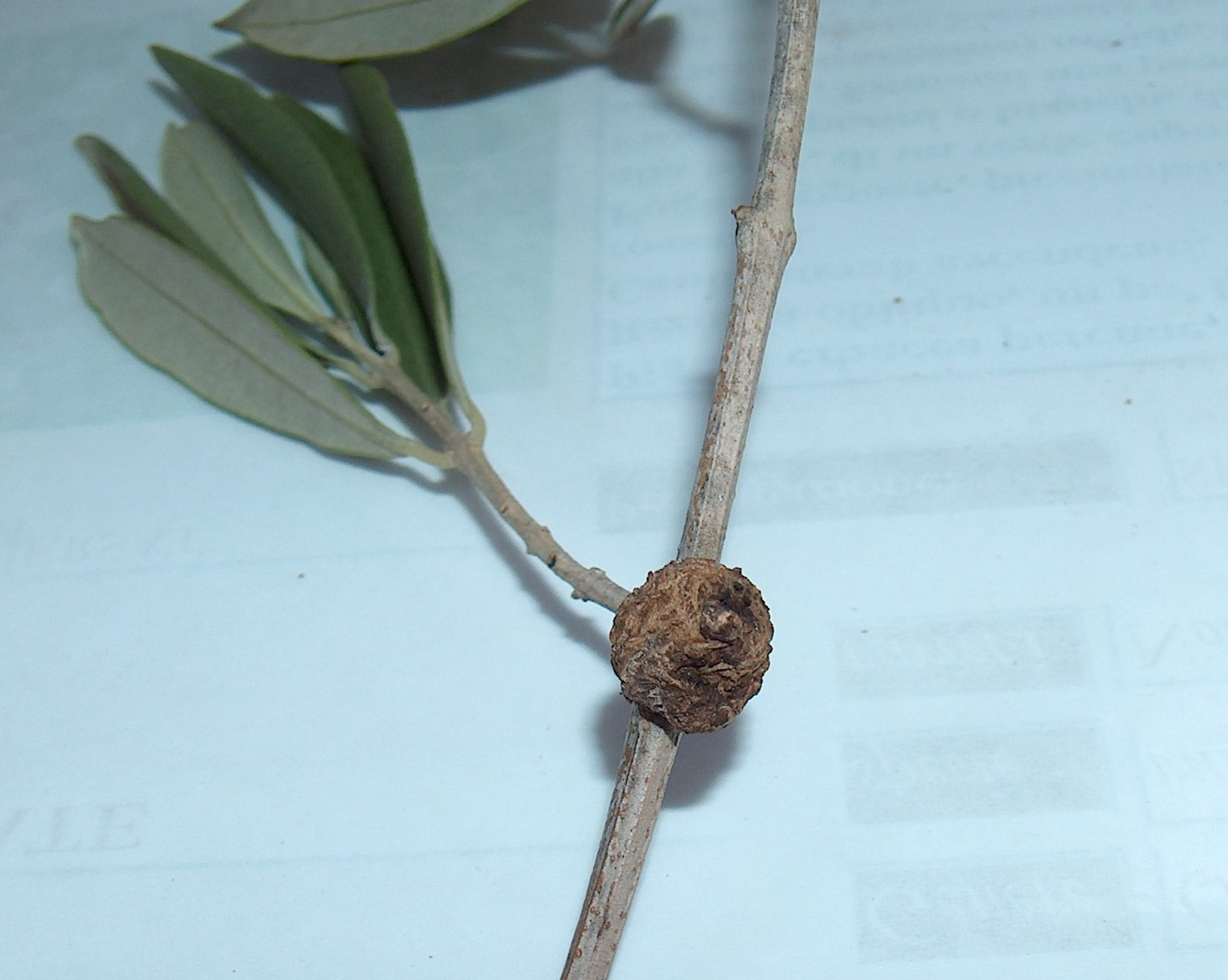
Tumor caused by P. savastanoi on an olive twig

In plant biochemistry, Kosuge carried out pioneering studies of the enzymes involved in secondary metabolism in plants during his PhD, researching the metabolism of coumarin in honey clover (Melilotus albus). This work included the earliest experimental demonstration of the important enzyme phenylalanine ammonia-lyase, which regulates phenylpropanoid metabolism. He subsequently continued to research how plant secondary metabolism is controlled.

His research in the field of plant pathology at the University of California, Davis, focused on interactions between pathogenic bacteria and their host plant. He investigated olive-knot disease, a cancer-like disease of olive trees caused by the bacterium Pseudomonas savastanoi, as well as a similar disease in oleander caused by different strains of the same bacterium. Kosuge showed the importance of indoleacetic acid (IAA), a plant hormone which is produced by P. savastanoi, in producing the tumors. In research described by the National Academy of Sciences as "meticulous", he dissected in detail the enzymes used by the bacterium to produce IAA. He also identified the series of genes encoding these enzymes and showed that they are found on the chromosome in bacterial strains that infect olive trees, but are located on a plasmid in those that infect oleander. He later showed that the genes are similar in sequence to those of Agrobacterium tumefaciens, which causes crown gall disease, and are encoded in T-DNA.

== Personal life and legacy ==
He married June in around 1951; they had a son and a daughter. Kosuge died from cancer at Davis on March 13, 1988. The 1988 volume of Annual Review of Phytopathology was dedicated to him, and the Tsune Kosuge Student Travel Award of the American Phytopathological Society was founded in his memory.

== Selected publications ==
Books

- Tsune Kosuge, Eugene W. Nester, eds. Plant–Microbe Interactions: Molecular and Genetic Perspectives (3 volumes; Macmillan; 1984, 1987; McGraw-Hill; 1989)
- Noel T. Keen, Tsune Kosuge, Linda L. Walling, eds. Physiology and Biochemistry of Plant–Microbial Interactions (American Society of Plant Physiologists: 1988)
- Joe L. Key, Tsune Kosuge, eds. Cellular and Molecular Biology of Plant Stress (Alan R. Liss; 1985)
- Tsune Kosuge, Carole Meredith, Alexander Hollaender, eds. Genetic Engineering of Plants: An Agricultural Perspective (Plenum Press; 1983)

Reviews

- Eugene W. Nester; Tsune Kosuge (1981), "Plasmids specifying plant hyperplasias", Annual Review of Microbiology, 35: 531–65, doi:10.1146/annurev.mi.35.100181.002531, PMID 7027906
- Jack Preiss; Tsune Kosuge (1970), "Regulation of enzyme activity in photosynthetic systems", Annual Review of Plant Physiology, 21: 433–66, doi:10.1146/annurev.pp.21.060170.002245
- Tsune Kosuge (1969), "The role of phenolics in host response to infection", Annual Review of Phytopathology, 7: 195–222, doi:10.1146/annurev.py.07.090169.001211

Research papers

- Tetsuji Yamada; Curtis J. Palm; Bob Brooks; Tsune Kosuge (1985), "Nucleotide sequences of the Pseudomonas savastanoi indoleacetic acid genes show homology with Agrobacterium tumefaciens T-DNA", Proceedings of the National Academy of Sciences USA, 82 (19): 6522–26, Bibcode:1985PNAS...82.6522Y, doi:10.1073/pnas.82.19.6522, PMC 390749, PMID 16593610
- L Comai; T Kosuge (1980), "Involvement of plasmid deoxyribonucleic acid in indoleacetic acid synthesis in Pseudomonas savastanoi", Journal of Bacteriology, 143 (2): 950–57, doi:10.1128/JB.143.2.950-957.1980, PMC 294399, PMID 7204339
