= TILLING (molecular biology) =

TILLING (Targeting Induced Local Lesions in Genomes) is a method in molecular biology that allows directed identification of mutations in a specific gene. TILLING was introduced in 2000, using the model plant Arabidopsis thaliana, and expanded on into other uses and methodologies by a small group of scientists including Luca Comai. TILLING has since been used as a reverse genetics method in other organisms such as zebrafish, maize, wheat, rice, soybean, tomato and lettuce.

== Overview ==
The method combines a standard and efficient technique of mutagenesis using a chemical mutagen such as ethyl methanesulfonate (EMS) with a sensitive DNA screening-technique that identifies single base mutations (also called point mutations) in a target gene. The TILLING method relies on the formation of DNA heteroduplexes that are formed when multiple alleles are amplified by PCR and are then heated and slowly cooled. A “bubble” forms at the mismatch of the two DNA strands, which is then cleaved by a single stranded nuclease. The products are then separated by size on several different platforms (see below).

Mismatches may be due to induced mutation, heterozygosity within an individual, or natural variation between individuals.

EcoTILLING is a method that uses TILLING techniques to look for natural mutations in individuals, usually for population genetics analysis. DEcoTILLING is a modification of TILLING and EcoTILLING which uses an inexpensive method to identify fragments. Since the advent of NGS sequencing technologies, TILLING-by-sequencing has been developed based on Illumina sequencing of target genes amplified from multidimensionally pooled templates to identify possible single-nucleotide changes.

== Single strand cleavage enzymes ==
There are several sources for single strand nucleases. The first widely used enzyme was mung bean nuclease, but this nuclease has been shown to have high non-specific activity, and only works at low pH, which can degrade PCR products and dye-labeled primers. The original source for single strand nuclease was from CEL1, or CJE (celery juice extract), but other products have entered the market including Frontier Genomics’ SNiPerase enzymes, which have been optimized for use on platforms that use labeled and unlabeled PCR products (see next section). Transgenomic isolated the single strand nuclease protein and sells it as a recombinant form. The advantage of the recombinant form is that unlike the enzyme mixtures, it does not contain non-specific nuclease activity, which can degrade the dyes on the PCR primers. The disadvantage is a substantially higher cost.

== Separation of cleaved products ==
The first paper describing TILLING used HPLC to identify mutations (McCallum et al., 2000a). The method was made more high throughput by using the restriction enzyme Cel-I combined with the LICOR gel based system to identify mutations (Colbert et al., 2001). Advantages to using this system are that mutation sites can be easily confirmed and differentiated from noise. This is because different colored dyes can be used for the forward and reverse primers. Once the cleavage products have been run on a gel, it can be viewed in separate channels, and much like an RFLP, the fragment sizes within a lane in each channel should add up to the full length product size. Advantages to the LICOR system are separation of large fragments (~ 2kb), high sample throughput (96 samples loaded on paper combs), and freeware to identify the mutations (GelBuddy). Drawbacks to the LICOR system is having to pour slab gels and long run times (~4 hours). TILLING and EcoTILLING methods are now being used on capillary systems from, Advanced Analytical Technologies, ABI and Beckman.

Several systems can be used to separate PCR products that are not labeled with dyes. Simple agarose electrophoresis systems will separate cleavage products inexpensively and with standard lab equipment. This was used to discover SNPs in chum salmon and was referred to as DEcoTILLING. The disadvantage of this system is reduced resolution compared to polyacrylamide systems. Elchrom Scientific sells Spreadex gels which are precast, can be high throughput and are more sensitive than standard polyacrylamide gels. Advanced Analytical Technologies Inc sells the AdvanCE FS96 dsDNA Fluorescent System which is a 96 capillary electrophoresis system that has several advantages over traditional methods; including ability to separate large fragments (up to 40kb), no desalting or precipitation step required, short run times (~30 minutes), sensitivity to 5pg/ul and no need for fluorescent labeled primers.

== TILLING centers ==
Several TILLING centers exist over the world that focus on agriculturally important species:

- Rice – UC Davis (USA)
- Maize – Purdue University (USA)
- Brassica napus – University of British Columbia (CA)
- Brassica rapa – John Innes Centre (UK)
- Arabidopsis – Fred Hutchinson Cancer Research
- Soybean – Southern Illinois University (USA)
- Lotus and Medicago – John Innes Centre (UK)]
- Wheat – UC Davis (USA)
- Pea, Tomato - INRAE (France)
- Tomato - RTGR, University of Hyderabad (India)

== Scientific literature ==
- Colbert, T; Till, BJ; Tompa, R; Reynolds, S; Steine, MN; Yeung, AT; McCallum, CM; Comai, L; Henikoff, S (Jun 2001). "High-throughput screening for induced point mutations". Plant Physiol. 126 (2): 480–4. doi:10.1104/pp.126.2.480. PMC 1540114. PMID 11402178.
- Draper, BW; McCallum, CM; Stout, JL; Slade, AJ; Moens, CB (2004). "A High-Throughput Method for Identifying N-Ethyl-N-Nitrosourea (ENU)-Induced Point Mutations in Zebrafish". The Zebrafish: Genetics, Genomics, and Informatics. Methods in Cell Biology. Vol. 77. pp. 91–112. doi:10.1016/s0091-679x(04)77005-3. ISBN 9780125641722. PMID 15602907.
- McCallum, CM; Comai, L; Greene, EA; Henikoff, S (Apr 2000). "Targeted screening for induced mutations". Nat Biotechnol. 18 (4): 455–7. doi:10.1038/74542. PMID 10748531. S2CID 12063367.
- McCallum, CM; Comai, L; Greene, EA; Henikoff, S (Jun 2000). "Targeting induced local lesions IN genomes (TILLING) for plant functional genomics". Plant Physiol. 123 (2): 439–42. doi:10.1104/pp.123.2.439. PMC 1539256. PMID 10859174.
- Slade, AJ; Fuerstenberg, SI; Loeffler, D; Steine, MN; Facciotti, D (Jan 2005). "A reverse genetic, nontransgenic approach to wheat crop improvement by TILLING". Nat Biotechnol. 23 (1): 75–81. doi:10.1038/nbt1043. PMID 15580263. S2CID 12109468.
