= Georg Jander =

American plant biologist

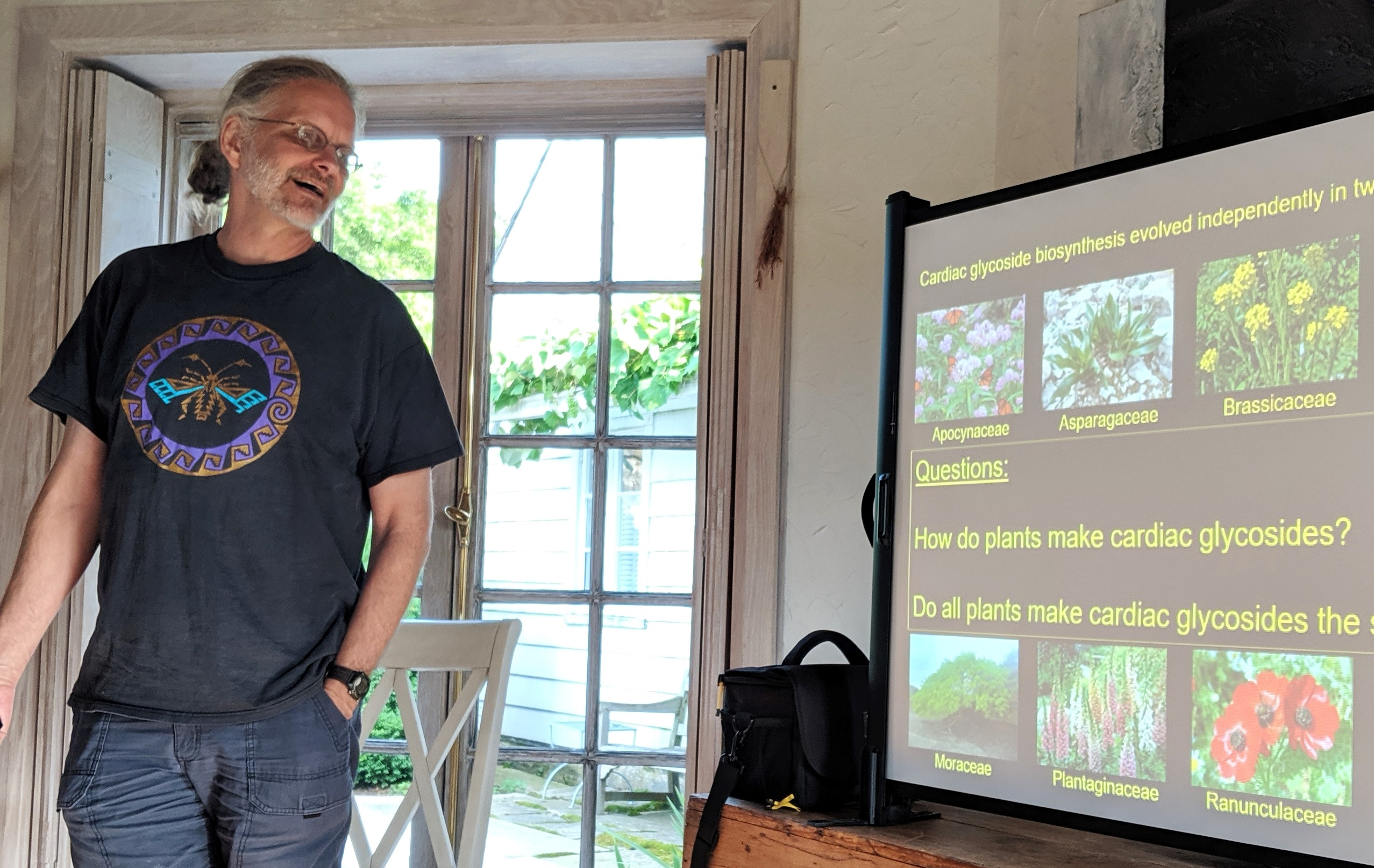
- Born: 1965 (age 60–61); Königstein im Taunus, Germany
- Education: Washington University in St. Louis; Harvard University
- Spouse: Lucia Jander
- Children: 4
- Scientific career
- Fields: Plant biology, entomology, chemical ecology
- Workplaces: Boyce Thompson Institute, Cornell University
- Thesis: Genetic studies on protein folding and protein secretion in Escherichia coli (1996)
- Doctoral advisor: Jon Beckwith
- Other academic advisors: Frederick M. Ausubel
- Website: btiscience.org/georg-jander

Georg Jander is an American plant biologist at the Boyce Thompson Institute in Ithaca, New York and an adjunct professor in the Plant Biology Section of the School of Integrative Plant Sciences at Cornell University. Jander is known for his research identifying plant genes involved in synthesis of biochemical compounds, particularly those related to insect resistance.

== Education ==
Jander earned his undergraduate degree in computer science from the McKelvey School of Engineering at Washington University in St. Louis in 1983. He received his Ph.D. in Microbiology and Molecular Genetics from Harvard Medical School in 1996 under the supervision of Jon Beckwith.

== Career and research ==
Jander has worked as a postdoctoral fellow in the lab of Fred Ausubel and as a scientist at Monsanto.

He currently works as a faculty member at the Boyce Thompson Institute, where his lab studies the genetic mechanisms that control plant secondary metabolism involved in defense against insects. A particular focus of the Jander lab has been research involving plant interactions with aphids. Jander's research publications have been cited more than 17,000 times.

Since 2005, Jander has been the principal investigator for a undergraduate plant science summer internship program at the Boyce Thompson Institute.

== Honors and awards ==
- Friedrich Wilhelm Bessel Research Award from the Humboldt Foundation (2011)
- Fellow, American Association for the Advancement of Science (2012)
- Fellow, American Society of Plant Biologists (2022)
