= William Henry Danforth =

American academic administrator (1926–2020)

William H. Danforth

13th Chancellor of Washington University in St. Louis
- In office 1971–1995
- Preceded by: Thomas H. Eliot
- Succeeded by: Mark S. Wrighton

Personal details
- Born: William Henry Danforth II; April 10, 1926 St. Louis, Missouri, U.S.
- Died: September 16, 2020 (aged 94) Ladue, Missouri
- Spouse: Elizabeth Gray (m. 1950; died 2005)
- Children: 4
- Relatives: William H. Danforth (grandfather); John Danforth (brother)
- Education: Princeton University (BA); Harvard University (MD)

William Henry Danforth II (April 10, 1926 – September 16, 2020) was an American physician, professor of medicine, academic administrator, and philanthropist. He was chancellor of Washington University in St. Louis from 1971 until 1995. Danforth was the grandson of Ralston-Purina founder and St. Louis businessman William H. Danforth, and the brother of former U.S. Senator John Danforth.

== Early life and education ==
William Danforth was born and grew up in St. Louis, Missouri. He attended Community School, St. Louis Country Day School, and Westminster College in Fulton, Missouri, and then transferred to Princeton University, graduating in 1947. After attending Harvard Medical School and interning at Barnes Hospital, he served as a physician in the Navy during the Korean War. Danforth returned to St. Louis and joined faculty of Washington University School of Medicine in 1957 as a cardiologist. This continued a connection to the university started by his grandfather, who had attended the University's Manual Arts School.

== Career at Washington University in St. Louis ==
Danforth eventually took on administrative duties as vice chancellor for medical affairs at the university. He also did research in the laboratory of husband and wife Nobel laureates Carl Cori and Gerty Cori. As vice chancellor, Danforth provided counsel to Chancellor Thomas Eliot during the 1960s, when there was much student unrest. In 1970, the family philanthropic foundation, of which he was president, made its first major gift to the university, an unrestricted $15 million, five-year grant. With universal support, Danforth was named Washington University's 13th Chancellor in 1971, replacing Thomas H. Eliot.

During his 24 years at the helm of the university, he is credited with having brought it to national stature. Chancellor Danforth raised $630.5 million under the Alliance for Washington University, which was the most successful fundraising campaign in U.S. higher education at that time. He established 70 new faculty chairs, grew the endowment to $1.72 billion, oversaw the construction of dozens of new buildings, and tripled the amount of scholarships awarded to students. Almost 60,000 students graduated while Danforth was Chancellor, and retention of undergraduate students grew during his chancellorship. In addition, recruitment of minority students increased.

Despite a rough start during the student unrest of the late 1960s and 1970s he was much loved by students and was commonly referred to as "Uncle Bill" or "Chan Dan". Chancellor Danforth maintained a clear presence during his entire tenure at Washington University and was frequently seen walking the grounds and talking with students.

After retirement in 1995, as one of the longest-serving chancellors in the country, he continued to be involved in the university, serving as the Chair of the Board of Trustees, and was named Chancellor Emeritus in 1999.

Danforth founded the Donald Danforth Plant Science Center, named after his father, in 1998 and was the Founding Chairman of the Board of Trustees for the center. Before dissolving in 2011, the Danforth Foundation gave its final $70 million to the center. In total, under William's stewardship, the foundation contributed over $423 million to Washington University and $226 million to the Danforth Plant Science Center.

== Awards and recognition ==
In 1977, William H. Danforth was named "Man of the Year" by the St. Louis Globe-Democrat. He also received the Alexander Meiklejohn Award from the American Association of University Professors for his support of academic freedom.

In 2006 the main "Hilltop" Campus of the university was named the Danforth Campus in recognition of the Danforth family's contributions to the university. In 2013, Danforth received The St. Louis Award.

A scholarship program has been named after Danforth and his late wife, Elizabeth (known as Ibby); it is awarded annually to "the Washington University student who embraces high ideals, whose life choices are guided by personal integrity, selflessness, a commitment to community, and a dedication to leadership and academic excellence."
