= James C. Carrington =

American plant biologist

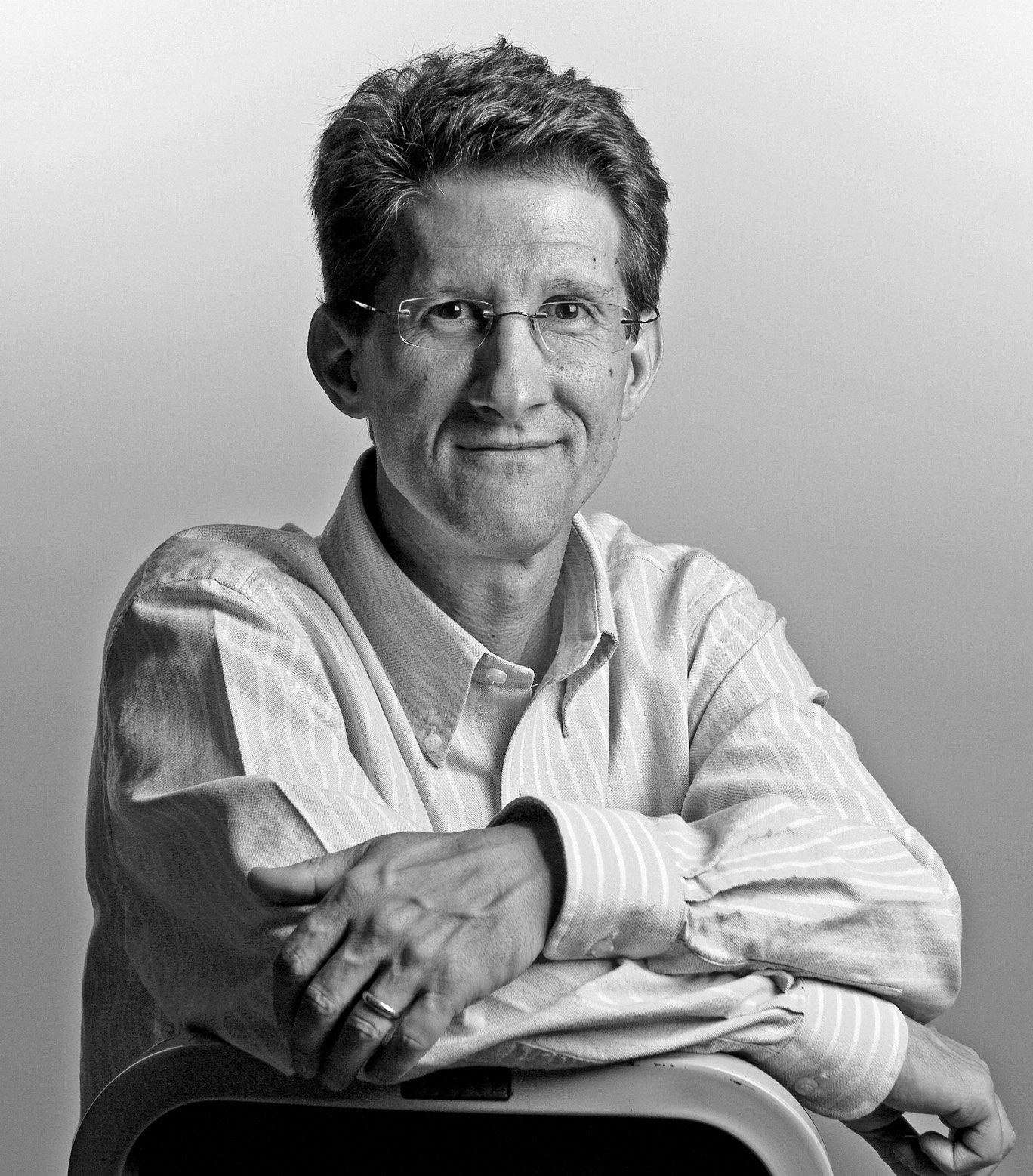
- Born: 1960 (age 65–66); Redondo Beach, CA
- Education: University of California-Riverside, University of California-Berkeley
- Known for: RNA Silencing
- Spouse: Teri
- Children: Four
- Scientific career
- Institutions: Texas A&M University, Washington State University, Oregon State University, Donald Danforth Plant Science Center
- Doctoral advisor: T. Jack Morris
- Website: www.danforthcenter.org/our-work/principal-investigators/james-carrington/

James C. Carrington is a plant biologist and a past president (2011–2025) of the Donald Danforth Plant Science Center. In 2005 he was elected a fellow of the American Association for the Advancement of Science and in 2008 he was elected to the National Academy of Sciences.

== Early life and education ==
Carrington was born in Redondo Beach, California in 1960. He attended the University of California, Riverside where he studied biology and worked as an undergraduate research assistant for William Dawson, a plant virologist. After graduating, he pursued graduate training at the University of California, Berkeley working in the lab of T. Jack Morris where he worked on sequencing and analyzing the genomes of plant viruses and graduated in 1986. After completing his PhD, Carrington was a postdoc at North Carolina State University in the research group of William Dougherty until 1988.

== Career ==
In 1988 Carrington was hired as an assistant professor in the department of biology at Texas A&M University. At Texas A&M he was promoted to Associate and later full professor. After nine years working at Texas A&M, Carrington was hired at Washington State University. In 2001 he moved to Oregon State University where he directed the Center for Genome Research and Biocomputing. In May 2011, Carrington began as the new president of the Donald Danforth Plant Science Center.

== Research ==
Carrington's early work on plant virology lead to the discovery that some plant viruses produce proteins which suppress post transcriptional gene silencing in plants and that this suppression is necessary in order for these viruses to spread, demonstrating that RNA silencing in plants functions as an antivirus defense mechanism. Carrington moved on to study natural small RNA molecules produced by plants including microRNAs and siRNAs, identifying roles for these gene silencing mechanisms in both plant development and chromatin state maintenance.

== Recognition ==
- In 2000 Carrington received the Ruth Allen Award from the American Phytopathological Society.
- In 2005 Carrington was made a fellow of the American Association for the Advancement of Science.
- In 2008 Carrington was elected to the National Academy of Sciences.
- In 2019 Carrington was made a fellow of the American Society of Plant Biologists.
