= Maria Harrison =

Plant biologist

Maria Harrison FRS
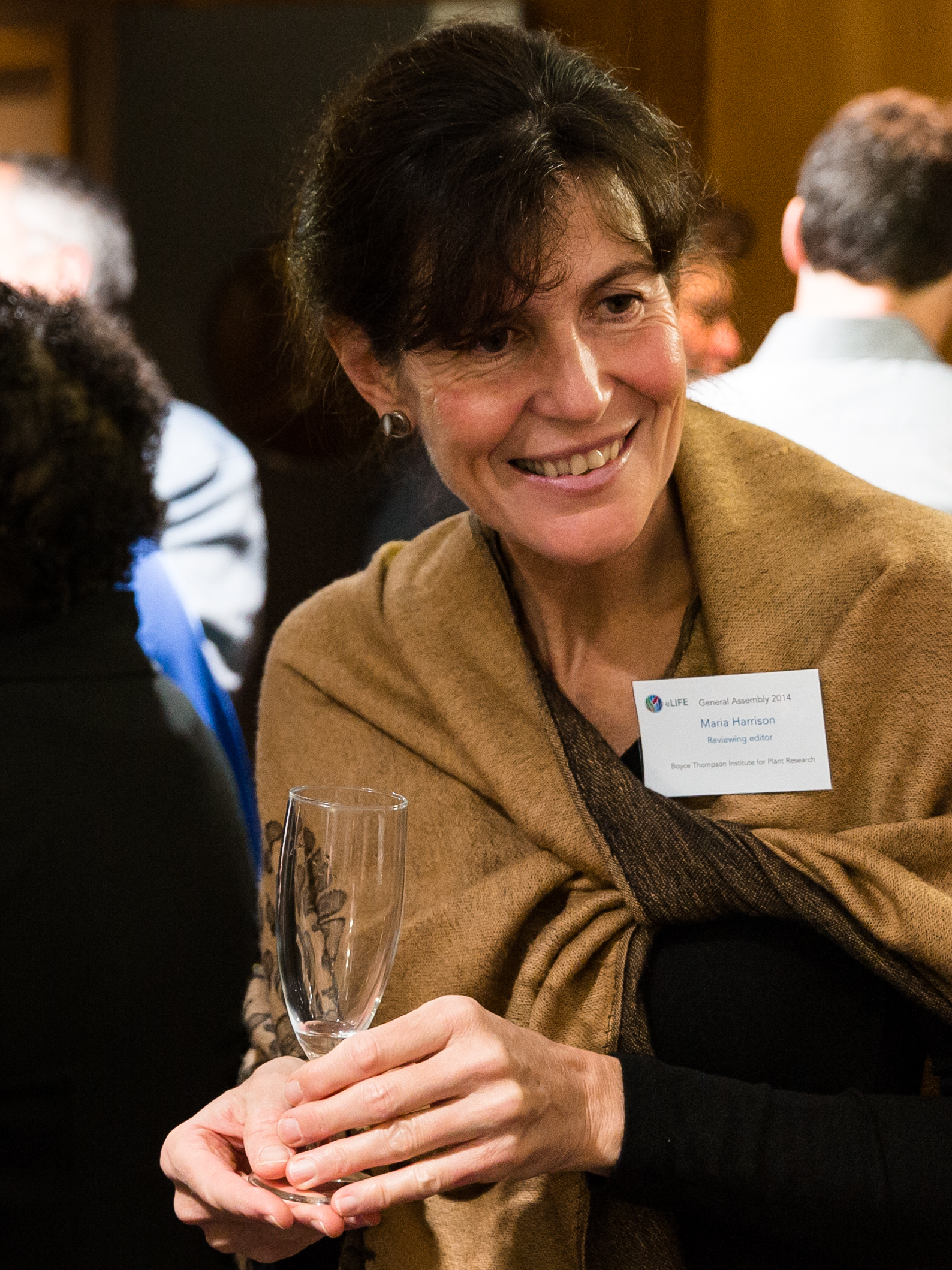
- Born: Maria J. Harrison
- Education: University of Manchester (PhD)
- Awards: Member of the National Academy of Sciences (2019)
- Scientific career
- Fields: Plant sciences
- Workplaces: Boyce Thompson Institute; Cornell University
- Thesis: Gene Expression During Tomato Seed Development (1987)
- Academic advisors: T. A. Brown
- Website: cals.cornell.edu/maria-harrison

Maria J. Harrison FRS is William H. Crocker Scientist professor at the Boyce Thompson Institute for Plant Science, and adjunct professor in the School of Integrative Plant Science at Cornell University.

== Education ==
She received her PhD in biochemistry from the University of Manchester in 1987 for research investigating gene expression in tomato seeds supervised by T.A. Brown.

== Career and research ==
Harrison's lab, including post-doctoral, graduate, undergraduate, and intern students, utilizes a combination of molecular, cell biology, genetic, and genomic techniques to investigate the developmental mechanisms underlying the symbiosis and phosphate transfer between arbuscular mycorrhizal fungi (AM fungi; AMF) (including Glomus versiforme, Glomus intraradices, and Gigaspora gigantea) and the roots of model legume Medicago truncatula. Among Harrison's most notable findings are that plants use hormone signaling to regulate AM fungi symbiosis and that phosphate transport is critical to the maintenance of this symbiosis. These discoveries have allowed the field of fungal-plant interactions to pursue new research questions including future manipulation of phosphate acquisition in valuable crop species.

=== Honors and awards ===
She was elected a member of the National Academy of Sciences in April 2019 and a Fellow of the Royal Society (FRS) in 2024. Other awards and honours include:

- Cornell University College of Agriculture and Life Sciences Faculty Excellence in Undergraduate Research Mentoring Award (2015)
- The Dennis R. Hoagland Award (2015)
- American Academy of Microbiology (AAM) Fellow (2013)
- American Association for the Advancement of Science (AAAS) Fellow (2012)
- William H. Crocker Scientist (2011)

=== Patents ===
| Title | US Patent |
|---|---|
| Root-specific phosphate transporter promoters | 12/257,276 |
| Plants with increased phosphorus uptake | 7,417,181 |
| Plant phytase genes and methods of use | 7,557,265 |
| MtHP promoter element | 7,056,743 |
