= Eric Conn (biochemist) =

American biochemist (1923–2017)

Eric Edward Conn (January 6, 1923 – September 2, 2017) was an American biochemist. His research focused on plant metabolism, specifically the intermediary metabolism of secondary plant products.

== Early life and education ==
Eric Edward Conn was born on January 6, 1923, in Berthoud, Colorado. He lived with his family in Belaire, Kansas during the Great Depression and the Dust-Bowl. They moved to Fort Morgan after losing their assets. There, Conn attended high school, and earned a four-year scholarship to the University of Colorado at Boulder, becoming a first generation college student.

Conn's professor and mentor, Reuben Gustavson, inspired his passion for biochemistry and recommended him to the Manhattan Project at Oak Ridge in his final undergraduate year. He worked there as an inorganic chemist, co-authoring a paper on the half-life of the nickel isotope.

After contributing to the Manhattan Project, Conn decided to continue his studies and in 1946, he applied and was accepted to the University of Chicago as a graduate student to research higher plants (trees, shrubs, flowering herbs, and ferns).

In 1948, he graduated with a doctorate and began teaching at the University of California, Berkeley from 1950 to 1958.

== Graduate and postdoctoral research ==
As a graduate student, Conn worked in Professor Birgit Vennesland's lab, who focused on the mediation of carbon dioxide fixation by malic and dark fixation enzymes. It was here where he gained exposure to higher plants. His graduate research focused on isolating an enzyme found in higher plants called Triphosphopyridine Nucleotide.

Following Professor Vennesland's advice, Conn accepted a position at the University of California, Berkeley.

In 1988, he was elected to the National Academy of Sciences.

== Teaching career ==
Conn taught at University of California, Berkeley, from 1950 to 1958, when he joined the University of California, Davis.

With Paul K. Stumpf, Conn co-founded the department of biochemistry and biophysics at Davis and taught an introductory course in biochemistry until his retirement in 1993.

Conn researched phenylalanine ammonia-lyase and cyanogenic glycosides. Notable students include the plant biochemist and phytopathologist Tsune Kosuge.

== Awards and honors ==
In honor of his teaching excellence, Conn received the Distinguished Teaching Award. In 1990, he received UC Davis Prize for Teaching and Scholarly Achievement Award with a cash prize of $25,000, for his dedication and creativity in undergraduate teaching. Conn also received the Pergamon Phytochemistry Prize and Certificate in 1994, for his contributions to phytochemistry along with a $5,000 prize. Eric E. Conn Young Investigator Award

Eric E. Conn Young Investigator Award

An award given in honor of Eric E. Conn to young researchers for outstanding research potential with a promising future in science and public service contribution.

Conn has been recognized as a Pioneer Member of the American Society of Plant Biologists.

In 1984, Bruce Maslin described Acacia conniana in his honour, in recognition of his biochemical work on cyanogenesis in plants, including species of Acacia.
