= Roger N. Beachy =

American plant biologist

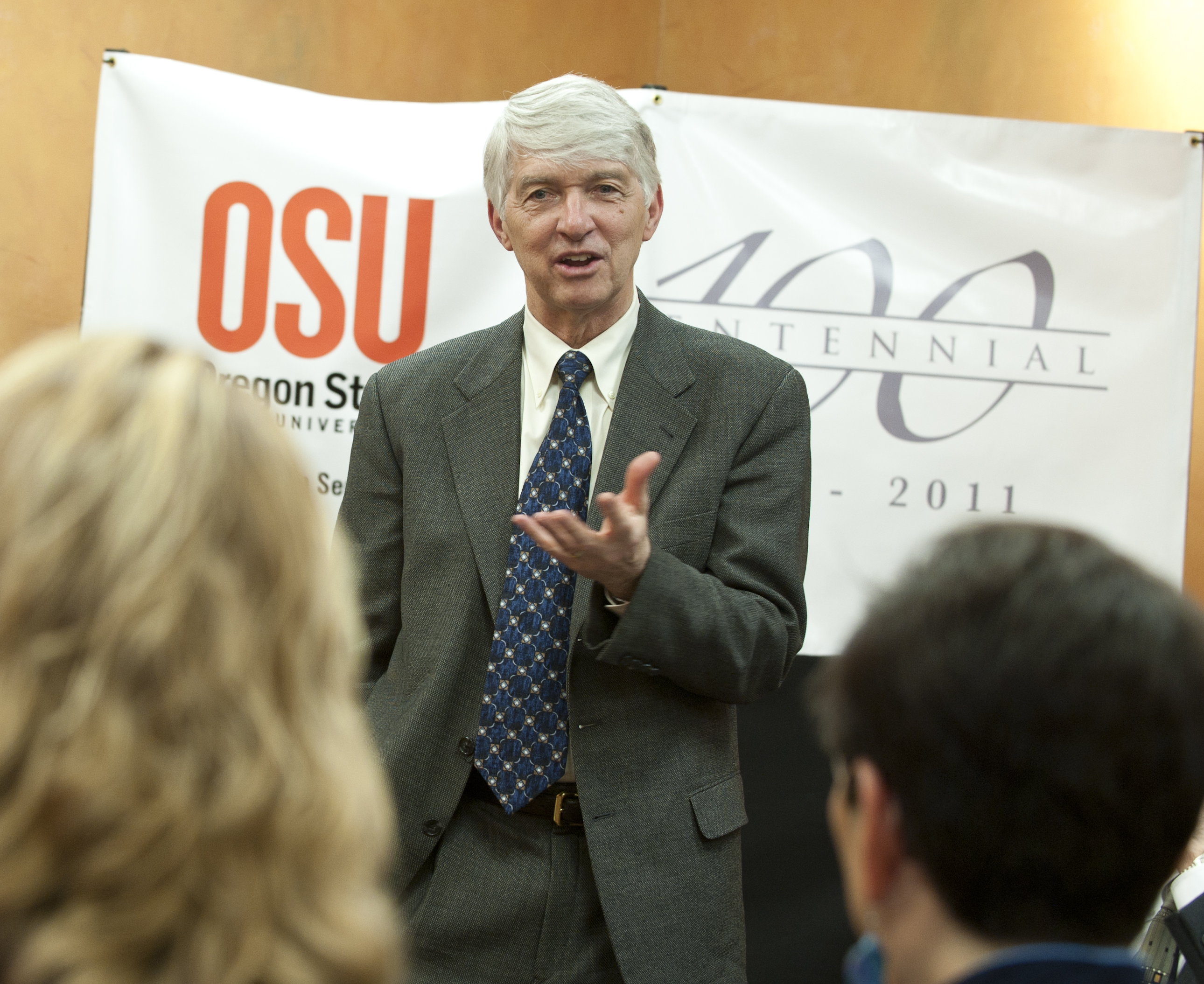
- Born: Plain City, Ohio, United States
- Education: Goshen College, Michigan State University
- Known for: Developing the first genetically engineered food crop, a virus resistant tomato.
- Spouse: Teresa S. Brown Beachy
- Awards: Wolf Prize in Agriculture, AAAS Fellow
- Scientific career
- Workplaces: Washington University in St. Louis, Scripps Research Institute, Donald Danforth Plant Science Center, USDA
- Thesis: "Studies on tobacco mosaic virus using hypersensitive tobacco tissue cultures" (1973)

Roger N. Beachy is an American biologist and member of the National Academy of Sciences who studies plant virology. He was the founding president of the Donald Danforth Plant Science Center in St. Louis, Missouri, and the first director of the National Institute of Food and Agriculture.

== Birth, family and education ==
Roger N. Beachy was born in 1944 in Plain City, Ohio. His father was a mennonite minister who left school in the 8th grade. He became interested in plant biology as a high school student at Bethany Christian Schools in Goshen, Indiana. In 1966, he completed his BA at Goshen College in Goshen, Indiana. He then would complete a Ph.D. in plant pathology at Michigan State University in 1973. Beachy began a postdoc in the lab of Milton Zaitlin at the University of Arizona for nine months when Prof. Zaitlin moved the entire research group to Cornell University, where Beachy remained for another four years.

== Academic career ==
In 1978, Beachy was hired as an assistant professor in the Biology Department of Washington University in St. Louis. He remained at Washington University, being promoted to associate and then full professor and becoming the head of the Center for Plant Science and Biotechnology, until 1991. From 1991 to 1998, he was the head of the Plant Biology division of Scripps Research Institute. In 1999, he was recruited to be the inaugural president of the Donald Danforth Plant Science Center in St. Louis, MO as well as resuming his appointment with Washington University. He left the Danforth Center in 2009 when he was appointed as the director of the National Institute of Food and Agriculture by President Obama, a role he served in until 2011. He also served on the Life Sciences jury for the Infosys Prize in 2009. From 2014-2020, he was a member of the National Science Board.

== Research ==
Beachy is a plant virologist whose research focused on molecular mechanisms of plant–virus interactions and the development of virus-resistant crops through genetic engineering. His work helped establish pathogen-derived resistance as a general strategy for protecting plants from viral disease.

His research at Washington University in St. Louis, in collaboration with Monsanto Company, led to the development of the world’s first genetically modified food crop, a variety of tomato that was modified for resistance to virus disease. His research demonstrated resistance to viral infection could be achieved by expressing viral coat protein genes in transgenic plants, a phenomenon later termed coat protein–mediated resistance. This approach provided a molecular basis for engineering virus resistance and was subsequently applied to multiple crop species, including tomato, potato, pepper, papaya, and squash, contributing to the broader adoption of virus-resistant transgenic plants.

== Awards and honors ==
- Fellow of the American Association for the Advancement of Science (1987)
- Elected a member of the National Academy of Sciences in 1997.
- Recipient of the 2001 Wolf Prize in Agriculture with James E. Womack "for the use of recombinant DNA technology, to revolutionize plant and animal sciences, paving the way for applications to neighboring fields".
