= Alice Cheung =

American biochemist

Alice Y. Cheung
- Born: Hong Kong
- Education: Smith College; Yale University
- Scientific career
- Workplaces: University of Massachusetts Amherst; Harvard University

Alice Cheung is an American biochemist who is a professor of molecular biology at the University of Massachusetts Amherst. Her research considers the molecular and cellular biology of polarization. She was elected a Fellow of the American Association for the Advancement of Science in 2020.

== Early life and education ==
Cheung was born in Hong Kong. Her parents decided that she and her brother would attend university in the United States, and Cheung moved to Smith College to complete her undergraduate studies. She moved to Yale University for her graduate studies, where she focused on molecular biophysics. Her doctoral research considered the genetic and biochemical regulation of aminoacyl tRNA synthetase. At a scientific conference, she heard Eugene Nester discussing the cell interaction between agrobacteria and plants, which inspired her to learn more about plant biology. After completing her doctoral research, Cheung joined Harvard University as a postdoctoral fellow, learning more about chloroplast-nuclear interactions, and reading work on self-incompatibility performed by Adrienne Clarke in Nicotiana alata and by June Nasrallah in Brassica oleracea. Inspired by this work, and the work of Elizabeth Lord, Cheung decided to investigate plant reproduction.

== Research and career ==
Cheung was recruited to the faculty at Yale University in 1987. She was promoted to associate professor in 1993, before joining the University of Massachusetts Amherst at a full professor of biochemistry. There she started working in cell biology. Her research considers the role of signalling strategies in plants, with a particular focus on the communication between pollen and pistil, which ultimately leads to fertilisation. She showed that FERONIA is an essential aspect of the wall-to-cell communication process.

== Awards and honors ==
- 1991 Yale University Junior Faculty Fellowship
- 2010 Fellow of the American Society of Plant Biologists Award
- 2014 University of Massachusetts Amherst Distinguished Faculty Lecturer and Recipient of Chancellor's Medal
- 2018 University of Massachusetts Amherst Samuel F. Conti Faculty Fellowship Award
- 2020 American Society of Plant Biologists Lawrence Bogorad Award for Excellence in Plant Biology Research
- 2020 Elected a Fellow of the American Association for the Advancement of Science
- Recognized as a Pioneer Member of the American Society of Plant Biologists.

== Selected publications ==
- Peter K. Hepler; Luis Vidali; Alice Y. Cheung (1 January 2001). "Polarized cell growth in higher plants". Annual Review of Cell and Developmental Biology. 17: 159–187. doi:10.1146/annurev.cellbio.17.1.159. ISSN 1081-0706. PMID 11687487. Wikidata Q34425154.
- Alice Y. Cheung; Hong Wang; H. M. Wu (1 August 1995). "A floral transmitting tissue-specific glycoprotein attracts pollen tubes and stimulates their growth". Cell. 82 (3): 383–393. doi:10.1016/0092-8674(95)90427-1. ISSN 0092-8674. PMID 7634328. Wikidata Q56082822.
- Alice Y Cheung; Hen-Ming Wu (1 January 2008). "Structural and signaling networks for the polar cell growth machinery in pollen tubes". Annual Review of Plant Biology. 59 (1): 547–572. doi:10.1146/annurev.arplant.59.032607.092921. ISSN 1543-5008. PMID 18444907. Wikidata Q37150350.
