= Noel T. Keen =

American plant physiologist

- Born: August 13, 1940; Marshalltown, Iowa, US
- Died: April 18, 2002 (aged 61); Riverside, California, US
- Education: BS in botany, Iowa State University (1963): MS in plant pathology, Iowa State University (1965); PhD in plant pathology, University of Wisconsin–Madison (1968)
- Title: William and Sue Johnson Endowed Chair of Molecular Plant Pathology (1997-2002): Acting director of the UCR Biotechnology Center (1997-2001); American Academy of Microbiology Fellow (1997); Chair, UCR Genetics Graduate Program (1994-1997); University of California President's Endowed Chair (1990-1992)
- Spouse: Diane Ill Keen
- Awards: UCR Faculty Research Lecturer (1996): USDA Secretary's Honor Award for Personal and Professional Excellence (1996); CSREES Award of Merit (1996); John Innes Institute Gatsby Traveling Fellow Lectureship (1992)

Signature
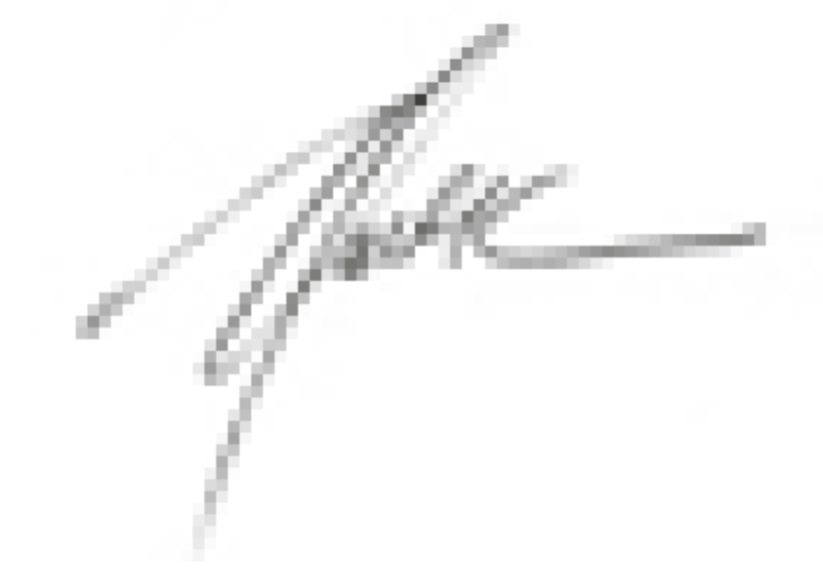

Noel Thomas Keen (August 13, 1940 – April 18, 2002) was an American plant physiologist. He spent his career teaching at University of California, Riverside (UCR). His research focused on the varied ability of cultivars to detect and resist pathogens.

== Early life and education ==
Noel Keen was born in Marshalltown, Iowa, and grew up on a farm, attending a rural school. He first attended high school in LaMoille, Iowa where he played basketball until the school was absorbed into the high school in State Center. At State Center he competed on the debate team until he graduated in 1958. Keen attended Iowa State University in Ames, Iowa, where he earned both his bachelor's and master's degrees. His master's thesis discussed the impact of Pyrenochaeta terrestris on onions. Keen was awarded his PhD from University of Wisconsin–Madison. He published 12 separate documents based on his thesis work, which merited him a job teaching at University of California, Riverside (UCR) despite not having any postdoctoral experience.

== Career ==
Keen arrived at UCR in 1968 and was promoted to associate professor in plant pathology in 1972. Keen studied the biochemical interactions responsible for resistance to Phytophthora sojae in one cultivar of soybean but not another, publishing the first findings on the subject in 1975. He coined the term "elicitor" to describe the chemicals given off by invading organisms that elicited phytoalexin response in the host plant. This work led him to identify the single gene in Pseudomonas syringae responsible for producing elicitors. Since 1977 Keen spoke at many National Science Foundation-funded international conferences, particularly with the Japanese scientists like Masaaki Yoshikawa. In 1997 Keen co-founded Connecting Research and Economic Development for the 21st Century (CORE21), a business-academia collective. He served on its board of directors until 2002.

== Awards and honors ==
In 1995 Keen was awarded the American Phytopathological Society's annual award, named after Ruth Allen (herself a plant pathologist), alongside fellow professor Brian Staskawicz. The two had worked together in 1980 at the International Plant Research Institute in San Carlos, California in order to use recombinant DNA techniques to clone bacterial avirulence genes. Their work confirmed an aspect of the Gene-for-gene relationship.

Keen was elected to the National Academy of Sciences in 1997. In 2000, an image of Keen standing next to the parallel β-helix structure of pectate lyase C was added as part of the Gluck Gateway Mural positioned under the California State Route 60 overpass between the University campus and the city of Riverside. Keen had discovered the parallel helix to be pectate lyase C's third folding form during a collaboration with X-ray crystallographers studying Erwinia chrysanthemi.

The American Phytopathological Society awards an annual cash prize in Keen's name for "research excellence in molecular plant pathology." University of California, Riverside hosts an annual lecture named for Keen focusing on plant biology and pathology. The lecture series is endowed by the Noel T. and Diane Ill Keen Fund. In 2003 University of California, Riverside named their renovated bio-agricultural library "Noel T. Keen Hall." Keen Hall houses UCR's stem cell research center.

== Death ==
Keen was the victim of a 1999 car crash. Subsequent to the crash, blood tests revealed Keen had leukemia. He remained active until weeks before his death in 2002.

== Selected published works ==
- The Polygalacturonase of Pyrenochaeta Terrestris. Iowa State University. 1965.
- —; Ji, Cheng; Boyd, Carol; Slaymaker, David; et al. (March 17, 1998). "Characterization of a 34-kDa soybean binding protein for the syringolide elicitors". PNAS. 95 (6): 3306–3311. Bibcode:1998PNAS...95.3306J. doi:10.1073/pnas.95.6.3306. PMC 19737. PMID 9501258 – via NCBI.
- Keen, Noel T. (1999). "Plants and microorganisms—listening in on the conversation". Nature Biotechnology. 17 (10): 958–959. doi:10.1038/13650. PMID 10504693. S2CID 12963851.
- —; Okinaka, Y; Yang, CH; Herman, E; et al. (December 2002). "The P34 syringolide elicitor receptor interacts with a soybean photorespiration enzyme, NADH-dependent hydroxypyruvate reductase". Molecular Plant-Microbe Interactions. 15 (12): 1213–1218. doi:10.1094/MPMI.2002.15.12.1213. PMID 12481993 – via NCBI.
- —; Fletcher, J (January 2003). "A critical shortage in u.s. Agricultural research funding: a time for action". Phytopathology. 93 (1): 18–19. doi:10.1094/PHYTO.2003.93.1.18. PMID 18944151 – via ResearchGate.
