= Myron Brakke =

American biologist

Myron K. Brakke (October 23, 1921 – June 15, 2007) was an American biochemist and microbiologist who is primarily known for the development of sucrose density-gradient centrifugation as well as his work on viruses and macromolecules. He was elected to the National Academy of Sciences in 1974.
