= Joyce Van Eck =

American plant biologist

Joyce Marie Van Eck
- Education: Pennsylvania State University, University of Delaware, Cornell University
- Scientific career
- Fields: Plant Biology, Genome Editing
- Workplaces: Cornell University, Boyce Thompson Institute
- Thesis: Transfer of large amounts of DNA via somatic hybridization and particle bombardment (1993)
- Academic advisors: Sherry L. Kitto

Joyce Van Eck is a plant biologist and faculty member at the Boyce Thompson Institute in Ithaca, NY. She is an adjunct professor in the Section of Plant Breeding and Genetics at Cornell University.

== Education ==
Van Eck attended Pennsylvania State University as an undergraduate, receiving a bachelor's degree in plant breeding. She studied plant tissue culture at the University of Delaware with Sherry L. Kitto including the regeneration of mint species from culture. She completed her PhD at Cornell University in 1993. In 2008 she became the director of the Boyce Thompson Center for Biotechnology, and in 2013 was promoted to assistant professor.

== Research ==
Van Eck was responsible for the first use of Cas9 for genome editing in tomato. She used a similar genome editing approach to conduct de novo domestication of the ground cherry. By editing three genes, her lab developed new varieties of ground cherries that were more compact and produced more flowers and larger fruits. She is part of the Physalis Improvement Project which is studying how goldenberries, ground cherries, and tomatillos grow across the country. Since 2021, she has served as a senior leader for the Center for Research on Programmable Plant Systems (CROPPS) project, a National Science Foundation-funded Science and Technology Center led by Cornell University.
