= Brian A. Larkins =

American molecular biologist

- Born: Brian Allen Larkins; August 12, 1946; Belleville, Kansas, U.S.
- Died: January 19, 2025 (aged 78); Tucson, Arizona, U.S.
- Education: University of Nebraska–Lincoln
- Occupation: Molecular biologist

Brian Allen Larkins (August 12, 1946 – January 19, 2025) was an American plant molecular biologist recognized for contributions to maize endosperm development and seed protein biology.

== Life and career ==
Larkins was born in Belleville, Kansas, the son of Jean and Ethel Larkins. He attended York High School, graduating in 1964. After graduating, he attended the University of Nebraska–Lincoln, earning his BS degree in 1969 and his PhD degree in botany in 1974. As a graduate student, he developed methods for isolating intact plant polysomes, a technical advance that enabled early studies of plant messenger RNAs. After earning his degrees, he worked as a postdoctoral fellow in the plant pathology department at Purdue University where he began work on maize seed storage protein synthesis.

Larkins served as a professor in the department of biochemical genetics at Purdue University from 1976 to 1988. His research established foundational models for the synthesis, structure, and cellular organization of maize storage proteins, particularly zeins, and elucidated molecular mechanisms underlying endosperm development and kernel quality. During his years as a professor, in 1986, he was named the Frederick L. Hovde distinguished professor, and was elected as a member of the National Academy of Sciences in 1996.

Beyond his research, Larkins was widely recognized for leadership and service to the plant biology community. For example, he served as Editor-in-Chief of The Plant Cell and as President of the International Society for Plant Molecular Biology, and later led major fundraising initiatives for the American Society of Plant Biologists, including the creation of the ASPB Legacy Society, which supports early-career scientists and long-term society programs.

== Death ==
Larkins died on January 19, 2025, at his home in Tucson, Arizona, at the age of 78.
