= Luca Comai =

Italian-American plant biologist

- Education: University of Bologna; Washington State University; University of California, Davis
- Known for: Development of glyphosate resistant plants, created the TILLING protocol
- Awards: Distinguished Research Award (2015); Faculty Teaching Award (2017); 2017 Innovation Prize for Agricultural Technology (ASPB)
- Scientific career
- Fields: Plant pathology Plant biotechnology
- Workplaces: Calgene; Washington State University; University of California, Davis
- Website: comailab.org

Luca Comai is an Italian plant biologist whose work has focused on trait discovery for improving agricultural crops and on developing protocols and systems for identifying new genes and mutations in plants. Through his work at Calgene, Comai was one of the first discoverers of the glyphosate resistance gene and is considered a pioneer in the field of plant biotechnology research.

His research since then has focused on developing the Targeting Induced Local Lesions in Genomes (TILLING) protocol that allows for new mutations and traits to be quickly identified within a target plant species through genome and sequence analysis. He has received a number of research and teaching awards, along with being named a Fellow for the American Association for the Advancement of Science (AAAS). In 2023, he was elected to the National Academy of Sciences.

== Education ==
Comai received his bachelor's degree in agricultural sciences from the University of Bologna in 1976 and his Master's degree in the field of plant pathology in 1978 from Washington State University. He then went on to earn his Ph.D. in plant pathology from the University of California, Davis and completed a postdoc at the same university. His doctoral thesis was on the subject of how Indole-3-acetic acid (IAA) is produced in bacteria and how this genetic function was homologous to the plant hormone production of the same name in plants that is encoded in the genome as T-DNA from Agrobacterium.

== Career ==
=== Calgene researcher ===
Comai first applied for a teaching position at the University of California, Riverside in January 1981. But when this position wasn't offered to him, he instead joined the biotech company Calgene in the latter half of 1981 during its initial opening period. While he had been attempting to get support among the Riverside faculty for his application, he had been informed of the properties of glyphosate and its specific targeting of the EPSP synthase enzyme. He proposed to Calgene's science board that they try to develop a plant gene mutation that changed the shape of EPSP synthase so that glyphosate would be unable to bind to it. His suggestion was rejected due to glyphosate being a product produced by another company, but he decided to work on the gene mutation on his own time. Using Salmonella, he used random mutagenesis and subsequent application of glyphosate to try and stumble across the EPSP synthase mutation he was seeking and he succeeded.

In 1982, Comai presented his glyphosate tolerance mutation to a fellow scientist, Steve Rogers, who worked at Monsanto and demonstrated that he had made a superior form of the resistance gene than the one Monsanto had been working on. Though it was still not good enough for agricultural production and Comai continued his independent work. He published a paper in the journal Nature in October 1985 describing how he and his colleagues at Calgene had created glyphosate-resistant plants using the gene mutation Comai had found years earlier. This outcompeting of Monsanto's flagship product created a strong sense of rivalry with Calgene and subsequent layoffs at Monsanto at the end of 1985.

=== University of Washington and UC Davis professor ===
First becoming a professor at the University of Washington in 1990, Comai's lab focused on the development of improved agricultural genetic traits by using the model organism Arabidopsis thaliana to co-develop what was referred to as the TILLING protocol. This system included developing gene models and inbred lines, including an expanded EcoTILLING protocol developed in 2004, to compare differences in these plant lines to the reference genome and isolate new mutations and traits for further research. He would later lead the TILLING Core Service Facility at UC Davis that continued developing a genetic analysis platform called "TILLING-by-Sequencing" that would be used on not just Arabidopsis, but was expanded to also include Camelina, tomato, onion, rice, and wheat. An award sponsorship of $489,000 was given to Comai's lab in 2014 from a joint donation of three companies in order to sponsor the further use of TILLING in current tomato cultivar populations.

Comai joined UC Davis in 2006, with his lab's research focusing on chromosome biology, functional genomics, and epigenetics, along with general mutational trait research. He is also well known for his work as a teacher of the "BIS 101" undergraduate genetics course, his use of whiteboard writing, and his co-produced video series alongside the university. In 2014, a collaboration between Comai's lab and the group of Professor Ryutaro Tao at Kyoto University found, through investigating the transcriptomes of several dozen male and female plants, the specific genes involved in sex determination in the persimmon species Diospyros lotus. As persimmon is among the 5% of plants that exhibit dioecy, this discovery opened up agricultural opportunities for trait improvement, and the research received significant media interest.

== Awards and honors ==
Comai was named a Fellow of the (AAAS) in 2012. The Distinguished Research Award was given to Comai in 2015 from the College of Biological Sciences at UC Davis thanks to his accomplishments in the TILLING protocol. In 2016, Comai was awarded with a Institute Honorary Fellowship from the University of Bologna for his work on the genetic improvement of plants. He was also given a Faculty Teaching Award from the College of Biological Sciences at UC Davis in 2017 for his innovations in teaching and his encouragement of high motivation among his students. The 2017 "Innovation Prize for Agricultural Technology" from the American Society of Plant Biologists was presented to Comai for his work on TILLING protocols and plant trait development.
