= Major M. Goodman =

American maize geneticist and plant breeder

- Born: Major Mereland Goodman; September 13, 1938; Des Moines, Iowa, U.S.
- Died: March 29, 2026 (aged 87); Raleigh, North Carolina, U.S.
- Education: Iowa State University; North Carolina State University
- Known for: Maize germplasm diversity Maize variety classification Use of tropical maize in breeding
- Awards: National Academy of Sciences; Oliver Max Gardner Award; Frank N. Meyer Medal
- Scientific career
- Fields: Plant breeding, maize genetics, statistical genetics
- Workplaces: North Carolina State University
- Doctoral advisor: Stanley Stephens

Major Mereland Goodman (September 13, 1938 – March 29, 2026) was an American maize geneticist and plant breeder at North Carolina State University. His work focused on maize genetic diversity, traditional variety classification, germplasm conservation, isozyme markers, and the use of tropical maize germplasm in temperate breeding programs. He was elected to the National Academy of Sciences in 1986.

== Early life and education ==
Goodman was born in Des Moines, Iowa, on September 13, 1938. He grew up in Johnston, Iowa, where Pioneer Hi-Bred is based, and he worked on Pioneer summer field crews while in high school. William L. Brown, a maize breeder at Pioneer who later became the company's president and chief executive officer, encouraged Goodman to attend college and graduate school.

Goodman attended Iowa State University on a National Merit Scholarship and earned a bachelor's degree in mathematics in 1960. He went to graduate school at North Carolina State University, where he earned a master's degree in genetics in 1963 and a Ph.D. in genetics and statistics in 1965. His doctoral dissertation was supervised by Stanley Stephens; it was titled Classification, Correlation, and the Structure of Populations, developing the basis of his interests and expertise that he went on to be known for.

== Career ==
After completing his Ph.D., Goodman received a National Science Foundation postdoctoral fellowship and joined the Escola Superior de Agricultura in Piracicaba, São Paulo, Brazil, where he worked with Ernesto Paterniani on the classification of maize accessions into traditional variety groups.

Goodman returned to North Carolina State University in 1967 as a visiting assistant professor in the Department of Statistics. He rose through the ranks to professor in 1976. In 1983, he moved to the Department of Crop Science; his research through this time included crop science, statistics, genetics, and botany. He later held the titles of William Neal Reynolds Professor and Distinguished University Professor. He continued working at North Carolina State University until January 2022.

== Research ==
Goodman's research focused on the genetic diversity, classification, conservation, and breeding use of maize germplasm. Goodman's early work used multivariate statistical methods to classify maize traditional varieties and to study relationships among maize populations. In the 1970s and 1980s, Goodman collaborated with Charles “Charlie” Stuber on allozyme and isozyme variation in maize. Their work developed an approach for identifying maize lines and hybrids using isozyme electrophoresis, an approach later compared to DNA fingerprinting. The work also provided genetic markers for studies of maize traditional variety classification, maize evolution, and relationships between maize and teosinte.

Goodman was a strong supporter of maize germplasm collections, arguing that such collections must be preserved, regenerated, evaluated, and used in breeding programs. He helped plan the acquisition of maize accessions into the United States germplasm system. He also helped organize efforts to regenerate Latin American maize accessions and participated in the Latin American Maize Project, which evaluated the agronomic value of maize landraces in their regions of origin.

After moving into NCSU's Department of Crop Science in 1983, Goodman focused more on applied maize breeding. His program released public inbred lines derived from southern United States, Midwestern, tropical, and tropical-temperate maize germplasm. Goodman's work led to the development of lines containing tropical germplasm for use in temperate breeding programs. Goodman also helped develop maize community genetic resources used for association mapping. He was among the coauthors of a 2005 study describing a 302-line maize association population developed for high-resolution quantitative trait locus analysis.

== Honors and awards ==
Goodman was elected to the National Academy of Sciences in 1986. He was elected a fellow of the Crop Science Society of America in 1986. In 1987, he received the O. Max Gardner Award from the University of North Carolina system and was appointed William Neal Reynolds Professor and Distinguished University Professor at North Carolina State University. He received the Frank N. Meyer Medal of the Crop Science Society of America in 1999 for work with plant genetic resources and the Holladay Medal for Excellence from North Carolina State University in 2003.
