= University of California, Riverside campus =

Coordinates: 33.973°N 117.328°W

The main campus of the University of California, Riverside (UCR) is located within the city of Riverside in western Riverside County, three miles (5 km) east of downtown, and comprises 1,112 acres (4.50 km^{2}) bisected by the Interstate 215/State Route 60 freeway. Nearly half of the total area is devoted to agricultural teaching and research fields, most of which are located west of the freeway.

== Development history ==
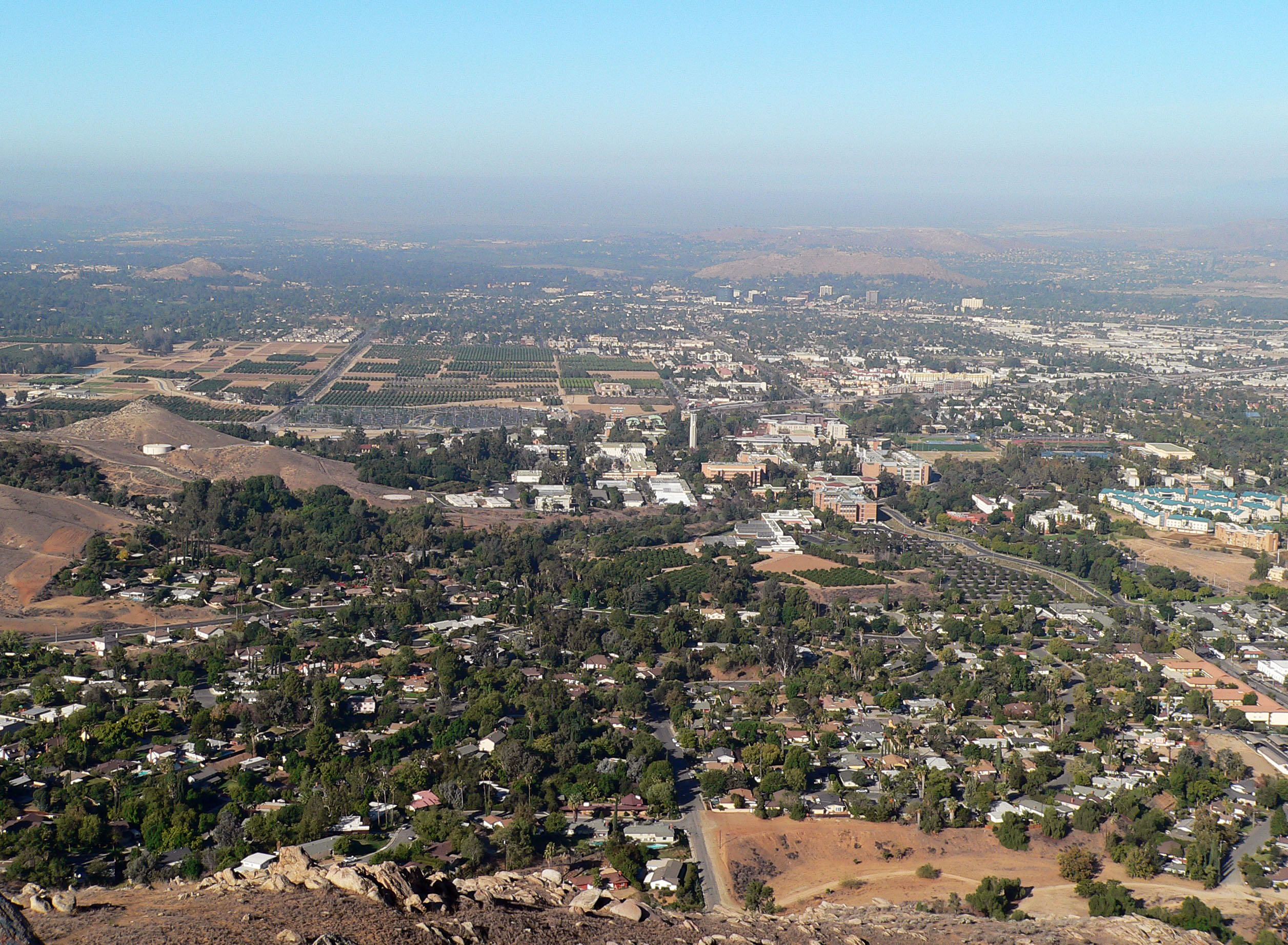
View from Box Springs Mountain

The original buildings that formed the earliest kernel of the campus included the UC Citrus Experiment Station laboratory, residential buildings, and barn, all of which are still in use today, although for different purposes. They were designed by Lester H. Hibbard of Los Angeles, a graduate of the University of California School of Architecture, in association with a colleague, H.B. Cody. Built at a cost of $165,000, the architecture of the major buildings followed the Mission Revival style suggesting the Spanish colonial heritage of Southern California. The site opened in 1917. The North Wing (originally the Soils and Plant Nutrition Building, now known as Chapman Hall), was designed by the firm of G. Stanley Wilson, Architect and was added to the CES in 1931.

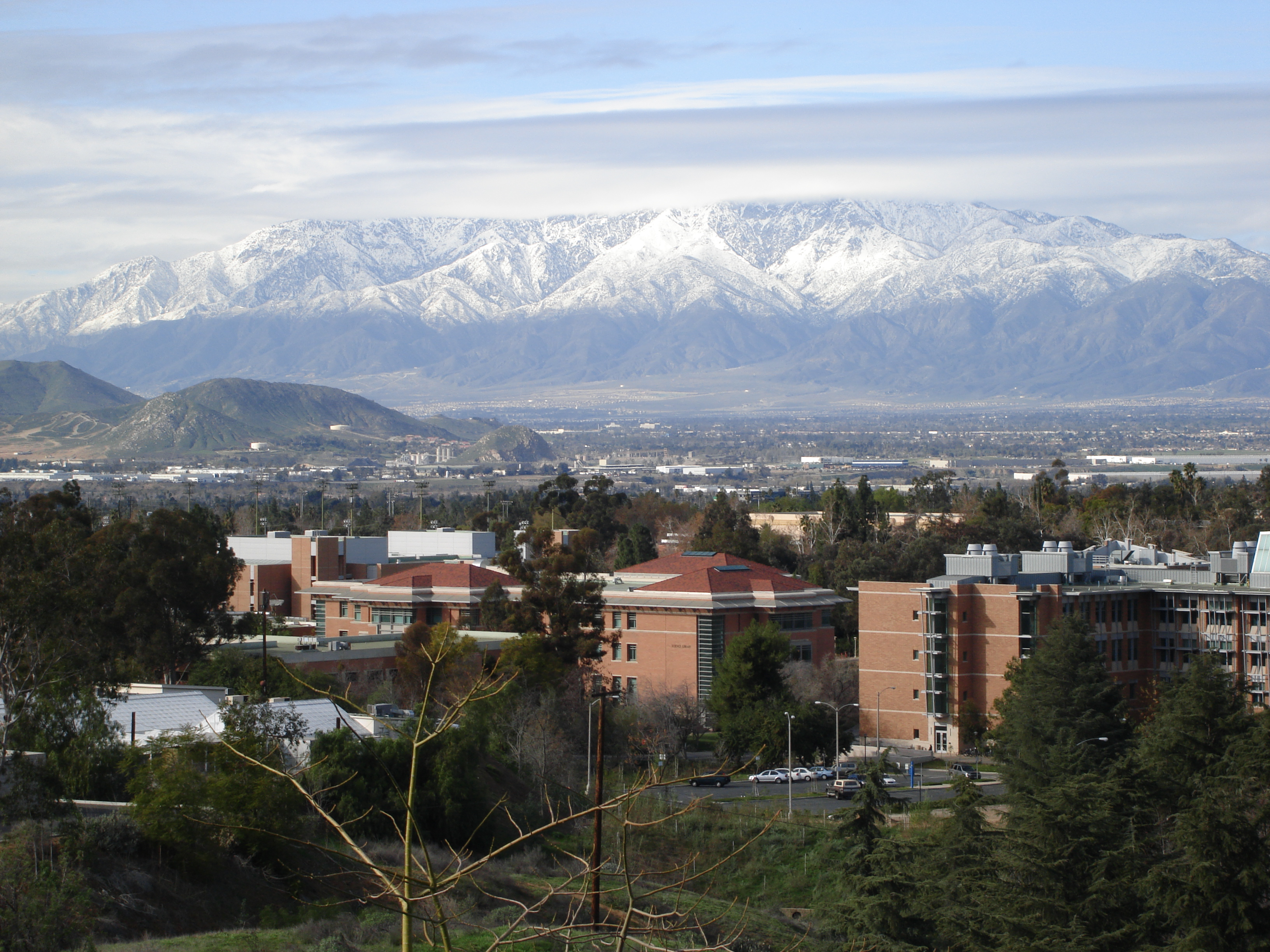
View of the San Gabriel Mountains from the Botanic Gardens

Further major construction largely ceased on the site until the groundbreaking for the new College of Letters and Science in April 1951. A group of five buildings in decidedly more Modern styles were completed by 1954: the Tomás Rivera Library, Webber Hall, Geology Building, Physical Education Building and Watkins Hall. These buildings were all constructed out of reinforced concrete and brick and designed by different architects paid for by state appropriation. The 38,871 ft (11,848 m) library was designed by the firm of Latta & Denny and constructed at a cost of $625,829. The 49,794 ft (15,177 m) Webber hall was designed by Chambers & Hibbard and cost $1,135,960, partially paid by State Fair and Exposition funds. The 43,794 ft (13,348 m) Geology Building cost $857,800 and was designed by Bennett & Bennett. The 45,830 ft (13,970 m) Physical Education building cost $983,000 and was designed by Arthur Froehlic. The 60,257 ft (18,366 m) Social Sciences Building, later renamed Watkins Hall, was designed by the firm of Clark & Frey and cost $1,051,000. In 1955, UCR purchased the 275 unit Canyon Crest housing complex, previously used by personnel stationed at nearby March Air Force Base, for use as student family housing. After five years of construction, UCR's first residence hall, the 18,000 ft (5,500 m) Aberdeen-Inverness, was completed in 1959. It was designed by the firm of Allison and Rible at a cost of $3,839,000 paid for by Federal loan funds.

After the Regent's designation of UCR as "general campus" of UC system in 1958, many new buildings and additions were laid out over the following decade. Following an east-west axis, new student residence halls and athletic facilities were developed along the southeastern quadrant of the main campus, while academic and research facilities were built up along the central campus area closer to the freeway. The Carillon Tower, the only ornamental structure on campus, was built in this period. Past the freeway, over 500 acres (2.0 km^{2}) of agricultural fields extended northwest to the intersection of Chicago Avenue and Le Conte Drive, forming the borders of "West Campus."

After the drop in enrollment and subsequent restructuring of academic programs in the 1970s, little capacity construction was undertaken over the next two decades, except as required by the developing research interests of CNAS. Boyce Hall, completed in 1974, was the only major addition in the period, although several greenhouses and agricultural support units continued to be built. However, in the mid-80s, enrollment started to grow significantly, by 76% over six years (from 4,655 students in 1983 to 8,220 students in 1989). This growth justified considerable further campus expansion over the 1990s. Major additions built in the 90s include the Entomology Research Museum completed in 1993, Bourns Hall completed in 1995, the Humanities & Social Science building in 1996, the Science Library in 1998, Pentland and Stonehaven residence halls in 2000, and the Arts building in 2001.

Since 1999, to accommodate a further wave of enrollment growth, more than $730 million have been invested in new construction projects. Active construction projects include: Phase II of the Campus Commons expansion, Engineering Unit 3 and Materials Science Building, Psychology Research Building, Genomics Building, CHASS Instructional and Research Center, and a new Students Academic Support Services Building. The Campus Commons (Phase I), 'Glen Mor' Arroyo Student Housing Apartments, and Alumni & Visitors Center were recently completed.

== East campus notable features ==
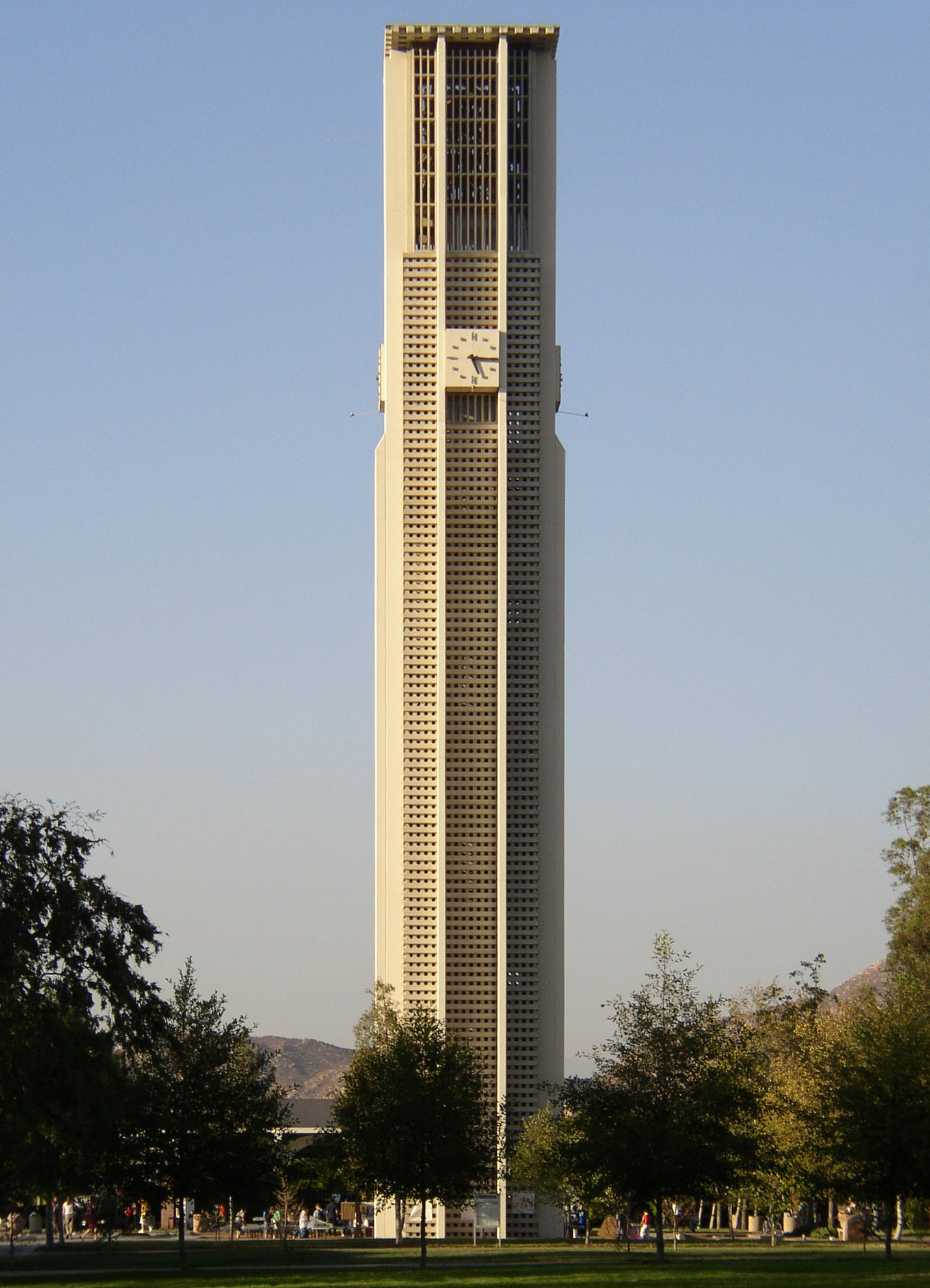
The Carillon Bell Tower is the dominant landmark in the center of the main campus.

East Campus, comprising approximately 600.8 acres (2.431 km^{2}), hostss the core cluster of academic buildings and services. Student housing and recreational facilities are provided in its northern and easternmost portion near the Box Spring Mountains. Wide, grassy pedestrian malls run throughout the campus.

In the center of the main campus stands the UCR Carillon Bell Tower, one of only four in California. It was given as a gift by former UC regent Philip L. Boyd and his wife Dorothy. The dedication of the carillon and bell tower took place on October 2, 1966. Designed by A. Quincy Jones - Jones & Emmons of Los Angeles, the tower is 161 feet (49 m) tall and contains 48 bells, cast in France. The bells cover four chromatic octaves and weigh from 28 to 5,091 pounds. Live performances generally occur Wednesdays at noon during the academic year, with occasional performances scheduled on the weekends.

The Commons student center was previously located directly northwest of the bell tower. The four-decade-old building was demolished at the end of 2005, and construction is underway to more than double the size of the center from 65,000 to 142,000 square feet (13,200 m^{2}). The first phase of the new $50 million Commons was recently completed, and includes meeting rooms, dining areas, places to study, and office space for student programs. In March 2009, the Commons officially changed its name to the Highlander Union Building (HUB).

Southeast of the bell tower is the main Tomás Rivera Library. Further southeast, past the intersection of Citrus and Eucalyptus Avenues, are the instruction halls and research centers of the College of Natural and Agricultural Sciences, including some of the original 1917 buildings.

Forming the southeastern border of the Riverside campus are the Botanic Gardens, which occupy 40 acres (160,000 m^{2}) of rugged terrain in the Box Springs foothills. Prominent natural features include two arroyos and a variety of plants native to the site. More than four miles (6 km) of hiking trails traverse the grounds.

The 215/60 freeway's University Avenue underpass separates the city and the university. Painted on the support walls of the underpass is the Gluck Gateway Mural, a 190-foot (58 m) mural of Riverside and UCR history from the days before the Citrus Experiment Station through 2000, the year the mural was painted.

== West campus notable features ==
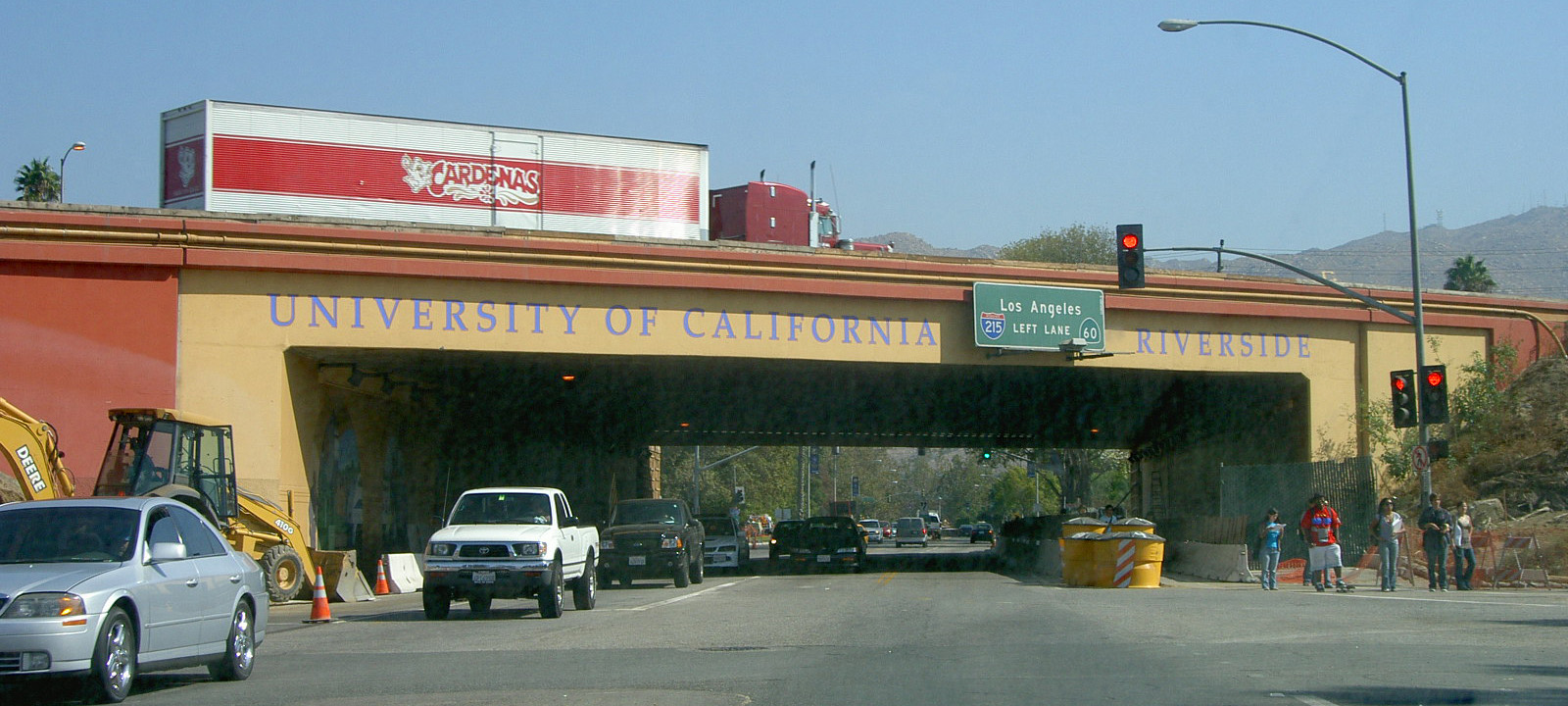
Entrance along University Avenue. Interstate 215 and Route 60 form a boundary between east and west campus.

Of the 511 acres (2.07 km^{2}) of UCR property comprising the West Campus, approximately 295 acres (1.19 km^{2}) are citrus groves and row crops used primarily by the College of Natural and Agricultural Sciences. University Extension, the USDA Germplasm Repository, International Village (student housing), a parking lot, office buildings (Human Resources and Highlander Hall), and other small no are also located on the West Campus. University Village, a mixed-use development located across from University Avenue adjacent to the freeway, provides a movie theater, stores, restaurants, office space, an apartment complex, as well as a parking structure and surface parking. The movie theaters serve as lecture halls during the day. Future capital expansion plans will convert dormant agricultural fields into new UCR infrastructure.
