= Donald Danforth Plant Science Center =

Botanical research institution in Missouri, US

Coordinates: 38°40′27″N 90°23′48″W

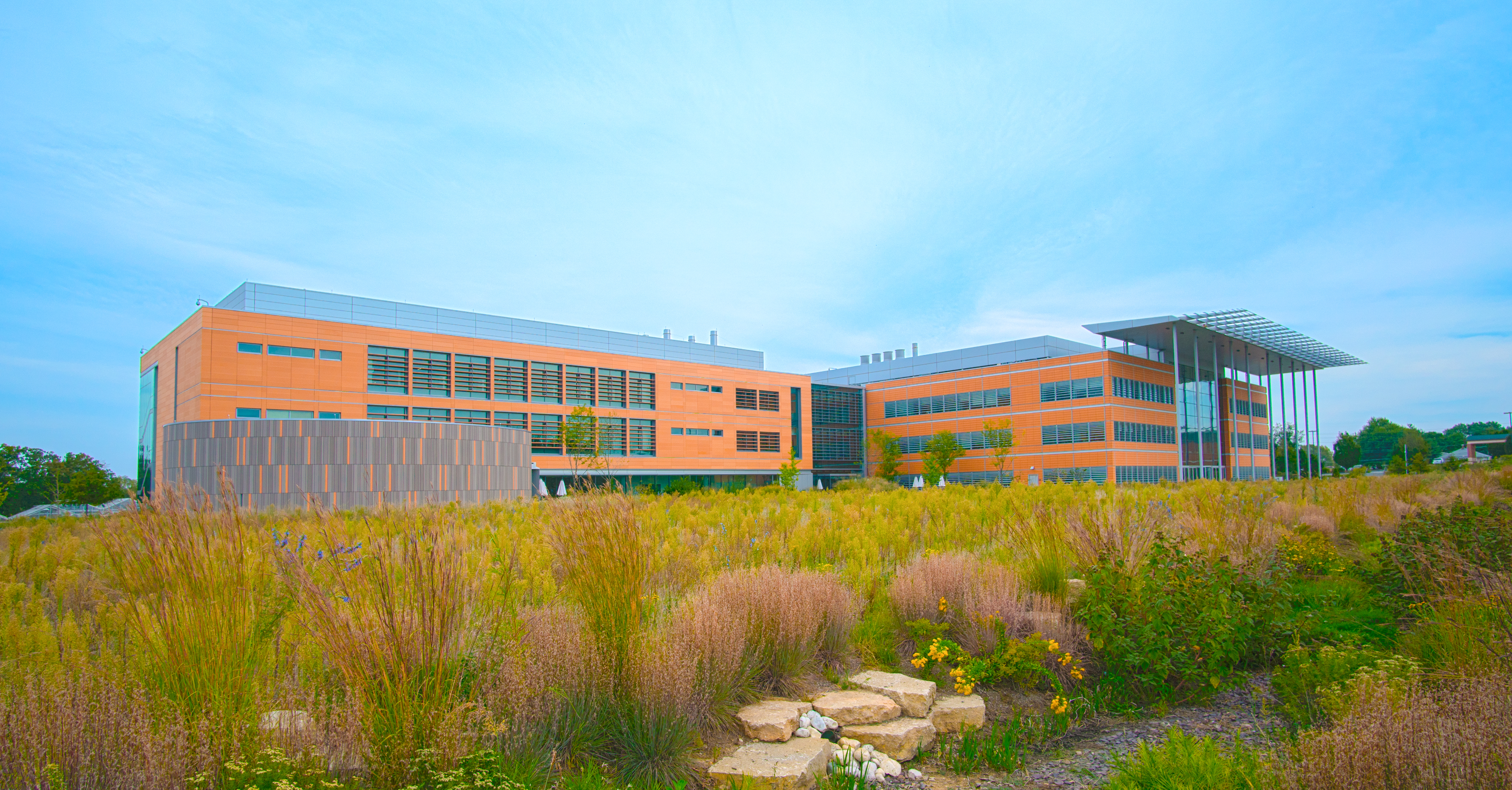
- Donald Danforth Plant Science Center 2017
- Established: 1998
- President: Giles Oldroyd
- Chair: Todd R. Schnuck
- Faculty: 30 principal investigators
- Staff: 242 employees
- Budget: $30M
- Endowment: $300M
- Address: 975 North Warson Road
- Location: St. Louis, Missouri, USA
- Website: www.danforthcenter.org

The Donald Danforth Plant Science Center is an independent, not-for-profit research institute dedicated to plant science located in the Olivette community of St. Louis County, Missouri, United States. It was founded in 1998 by William Henry Danforth, chancellor emeritus of Washington University in St. Louis and named after his father, and established through a $60 million gift from the Danforth Foundation, a $50 million gift from the Monsanto Fund, the donation of 40 acres of land from Monsanto, and $25 million in tax credits from the State of Missouri.

The Center has a $30 million annual operating budget, a $300 million endowment, and 242 employees, including 30 principal investigators. It is home to the Enterprise Rent-A-Car Institute for Renewable Fuels and the International Institute for Crop Improvement.

The Danforth Center Core Facilities include bioinformatics, integrated microscopy, phenotyping, plant growth, proteomics and mass spectrometry, and tissue culture and transformation. Services are offered to both internal and external clients, and training/access is available to scientists interested in developing knowledge and skills.

== History ==
Front entrance to Donald Danforth Plant Science Center

Founded in 1998 through the efforts of William Henry Danforth, chancellor emeritus of Washington University in St. Louis, the Center was established with a $60 million gift from the Danforth Foundation, a $50 million gift from the Monsanto Fund, the donation of 40 acres of land from Monsanto, and $25 million in tax credits from the State of Missouri.

The founding chairman was William Henry Danforth with Ernest G. Jaworski as director. Roger N. Beachy became the first president in 1999.

The Danforth Center building was sustainably designed by Nicholas Grimshaw and opened in October 2001.

On September 24, 2009, Beachy was appointed by U.S. president Barack Obama to be the first director of the National Institute of Food and Agriculture (NIFA).

James C. Carrington served as president and chief executive officer from 2011 to 2025. In October 2025, Giles Oldroyd became president.

In June 2009 the first building of the new Bio-Research & Development Growth (BRDG) Park biotechnology incubator opened on the Danforth Center campus.

In April 2016, the William Henry Danforth Wing opened. Surrounding the buildings are six acres of reconstructed native Missouri prairie.

== Programs ==
The VIRCA Plus (Virus Resistant Cassava for Africa Plus) research program, formerly just VIRCA, is coordinated with Kenya Agricultural & Livestock Research Organization (KALRO) and Uganda's National Crops Resources Research Institute (NaCRRI).
