= Daniel Voytas =

American geneticist

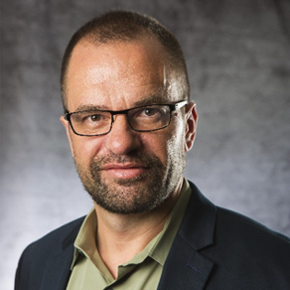
- Education: Harvard Medical School
- Known for: genome engineering technologies
- Scientific career
- Fields: Biology
- Workplaces: University of Minnesota, Calyxt

Daniel Voytas is an American geneticist who is Professor of Genetics, Cell Biology and Development at the University of Minnesota and Director of the Center for Precision Plant Genomics. In addition to his position at the University of Minnesota, Dr. Voytas co-founded Calyxt, an agricultural biotechnology company that used gene editing for crop improvement and launched the world’s first gene edited food ingredient. In 2019, Dr. Voytas was elected to the National Academy of Sciences.

== Biography ==
Voytas earned a Ph.D. in genetics from Harvard Medical School under the supervision of Frederick M. Ausubel. His graduate work focused on studying transposable elements in plants. He then worked as a postdoctoral fellow at Johns Hopkins with Jef Boeke; his work focused on several retrotransposons in yeast and helped clarify the molecular mechanisms by which retrotransposons select chromosomal integration sites.

In 1992, Voytas joined the faculty at Iowa State University. He was promoted to associate professor in 1997 and to Professor in 2001. In 2008, he joined the faculty in the Department of Genetics, Cell Biology and Development at the University of Minnesota.

Voytas is best known for his pioneering work to develop methods for precisely altering DNA sequences in living cells, enabling detailed functional analysis of genes and genetic pathways. Dan's work has enabled efficient methods for targeted genome modification of plants using sequence-specific nucleases. Using zinc finger nucleases (ZFNs), TAL effector nucleases (TALEN), and the CRISPR/Cas9 system, Dan has achieved targeted gene knockouts, replacements and insertions in a variety of plant species. This type of targeted genome modification has applications ranging from understanding plant gene function to developing crop plants with new traits of value. Dr. Voytas’ lab is currently developing methods for plant gene editing to advance basic biology and develop new crop varieties.

== Recognition ==
Voytas has co-authored over 100 peer-reviewed publications and holds a number of patents relating to genome editing and plant biotechnology. Voytas is a member of the National Academy of Sciences as well as an elected Fellow of the American Association for the Advancement of Science. The use of genetic engineering to modify crop plants was selected as one of MIT's 10 breakthrough technologies for the year 2015.

== Selected publications ==
- Cermak T, Starker CG, Voytas DF. (2015) Efficient design and assembly of custom TALENs using the Golden Gate platform. Methods Mol Biol. 1239:133-159.
- Gil-Humanes J, Voytas DF. (Sept. 2014) Wheat rescued from fungal disease. Nat Biotechnol. 32(9):886-7.
- Baltes N.J., Gil-Humanes J., Cermak T., Atkins P.A. and Voytas D.F. (2014) DNA Replicons for Plant Genome Engineering. Plant Cell 26: 151-63
- Qi Y., Zhang Y., Zhang F., Baller J.A., Cleland S.C., Ryu Y., Starker C.G. and Voytas D.F. (2013) Increasing frequencies of site-specific mutagenesis and gene targeting in Arabidopsis by manipulating DNA repair pathways. Genome Res. 23: 547-54
- Zhang Y., Zhang F., Li X., Baller J.A., Qi Y., Starker C.G., Bogdanove A.J. and Voytas D.F. (2013) TALENs enable efficient plant genome engineering. Plant Physiol 161: 1-8
- Baller J.A., Gao J. and Voytas D.F. (2011) Access to DNA establishes a secondary target site bias for the yeast retrotransposon Ty5. Proc Natl Acad Sci USA 108: 20351-6
- Baller J.A., Gao J., Stamenova R., Curcio M.J. and Voytas D.F. (2012) A nucleosomal surface defines an integration hotspot for the Saccharomyces cerevisiae Ty1 retrotransposon. Genome Res 22: 704-13
- Cermak T., Doyle E.L., Christian M., Wang L., Zhang Y., Schmidt C., Baller J.A., Somia N.V., Bogdanove A.J. and Voytas D.F. (2011) Efficient design and assembly of custom TALEN and other TAL effector-based constructs for DNA targeting. Nucleic Acids Res 39: e82 Christian, M., Cermak, T., Doyle, E., Schmidt, C., Zhang, F., Hummel, A., Bogdanove, A.J. and Voytas D.F. (2010) Targeting DNA double-strand breaks with TAL effector nucleases. Genetics 186: 757-6
