= Robert Goldberg (plant biologist) =

American plant biologist (1944–2025)

Robert B. Goldberg
- Born: Robert Bruce Goldberg; May 28, 1944
- Died: November 21, 2025 (aged 81)
- Education: Ohio University (B.S.); University of Arizona (M.S., Ph.D.)
- Known for: Plant gene expression; seed development; founding editor of The Plant Cell
- Scientific career
- Fields: Plant biology Molecular biology
- Workplaces: University of California, Los Angeles

Robert Bruce Goldberg (May 28, 1944 – November 21, 2025) (also known as Bob Goldberg) was an American plant molecular biologist whose research focused on gene regulation, seed development, and cell-type–specific gene expression in plants.

He was a professor at the University of California, Los Angeles, where he played a central role in developing plant molecular genetics. Goldberg is also notable as the founding Editor-in-Chief of The Plant Cell, a leading international journal in plant biology, which he helped launch in 1989 as part of the American Society of Plant Biologists' effort to create a premier venue for mechanistic and conceptual advances in the field.

Goldberg's research combined molecular genetics, genomics, and cell biology to address fundamental questions in plant development, particularly the regulation of gene expression during embryogenesis and seed formation.

In addition to his research contributions, Goldberg played a significant leadership role in the plant science community through editorial service, professional society involvement, and mentorship. He was elected to the United States National Academy of Sciences in recognition of his scientific contributions and was named a Pioneer Member of the American Society of Plant Biologists.

== Early life and education ==
Robert Bruce Goldberg was born on May 28, 1944 and grew up in Cleveland, Ohio. He earned a Bachelor of Science degree in botany from Ohio University in 1966. He then completed a Master of Science degree in genetics in 1969 and a PhD degree in genetics in 1971 at the University of Arizona with Albert Siegel.

== Academic career ==
Goldberg joined the faculty at the University of California, Los Angeles (UCLA) in 1976, where he served as a professor of molecular, cell, and developmental biology. His research focused on gene regulation during plant reproductive development and seed formation.

A major contribution of Goldberg's laboratory was the identification of tissue-specific regulatory elements controlling gene expression in plants. His group characterized the TA29 promoter, which drives expression specifically in tapetal cells of the anther. This discovery provided a molecular approach for engineering male sterility and was later incorporated into hybrid seed production systems in crop plants.

Goldberg also conducted extensive research on seed development, using molecular and genetic approaches to study gene expression programs underlying seed differentiation and viability. His work helped establish seeds as a model system for investigating developmental regulation in plants.

In addition to his research, Goldberg was known for his undergraduate teaching at UCLA. He developed large-enrollment courses that emphasized active discussion. A profile notes his use of nontraditional teaching methods, including oral examinations and student-led analysis of primary literature.

== Founding of The Plant Cell ==
In the late 1980s, Goldberg played a central role in the creation of The Plant Cell, a research journal established by the American Society of Plant Biologists to provide a high-profile venue for mechanistic and conceptual advances in plant molecular biology. At the time, plant research was rapidly adopting molecular genetic approaches, yet lacked a journal dedicated to publishing plant-focused studies at the same level visibility as leading journals in other areas of biology.

Goldberg was appointed the journal's founding Editor-in-Chief and guided its development from its inception in 1989. In editorials published during the journal's early years, he articulated a vision for The Plant Cell as a forum for research, emphasizing studies that advanced fundamental understanding of plant biology rather than narrowly descriptive or incremental findings.

Under Goldberg's editorial leadership, The Plant Cell became an influential international journal in plant science. The journal's emphasis on rigorous peer review, experimental completeness, and clarity of presentation contributed to changes in publishing practices within plant biology.

Goldberg later reflected on the journal's founding as part of a broader effort to strengthen plant biology and to ensure that plant-focused research received equal visibility alongside advances in other areas of molecular and cellular biology.

== Honors and recognition ==
Selected honors and recognitions include

- Election to the National Academy of Sciences (2001)
- Fellow of the American Society of Plant Biologists (2007)
- Stephen Hales Prize, American Society of Plant Biologists (2015)
- National Order of Scientific Merit (Brazil) (1998)
- Distinguished Service Award, American Society of Plant Physiologists (1993)
- Gordon Conference chair, Plant Molecular Biology (1984)
