= Stanley G. Stephens (geneticist) =

British-American plant geneticist (1911–1986)

- Born: Stanley George Stephens; September 2, 1911; Worcestershire, England
- Died: November 7, 1986 (aged 75)
- Education: University of Cambridge; University of Edinburgh
- Known for: Cotton genetics Evolution of Gossypium; Polyploidy in crop plants
- Awards: National Academy of Sciences
- Scientific career
- Fields: Genetics, plant breeding, evolutionary biology
- Workplaces: North Carolina State University

Stanley George Stephens (September 2, 1911 – November 7, 1986) was a British-American plant geneticist known for his work on cotton genetics, crop domestication, and the evolution of Gossypium. He was elected to the National Academy of Sciences in 1967.

== Early life and education ==
Stephens was born in Worcestershire, England. He studied at St John's College, Cambridge, where he received a degree in natural sciences in 1933 and a diploma in agricultural science in 1934. He later earned a Ph.D. from the University of Edinburgh in 1941 with a dissertation on yield characters in cereals, particularly oats.

== Career and research ==
In 1938, while still a doctoral student, Stephens became an assistant geneticist at the Cotton Research Station in Trinidad, where he began research on the genetics, cytogenetics, and evolution of cotton. After appointments at McGill University, the Carnegie Institution for Science, and Texas A&M University, he joined North Carolina State University in 1949.

At North Carolina State, Stephens served as professor of agronomy and as head of the Faculty of Genetics from 1951 to 1957. He retired in 1974. His research examined the origin and differentiation of New World cottons, interspecific hybridization, polyploidy, gene duplication, reproductive isolation, and the role of natural variation in crop improvement. He also studied archaeological cotton remains from coastal Peru as evidence bearing on the early domestication of Gossypium barbadense.

Among his doctoral students at North Carolina State was maize geneticist Major M. Goodman.

Stephens coauthored The Evolution of Gossypium and the Differentiation of the Cultivated Cottons, published by Oxford University Press in 1947.

== Honors ==
Stephens was appointed a William Neal Reynolds Professor at North Carolina State University in 1951. He received the Cotton Genetics Award in 1962, was elected to the National Academy of Sciences in 1967, received the North Carolina Award in 1968, and received the Oliver Max Gardner Award from NCSU in 1970.
