= Boyce Thompson Institute =

Independent plant-based research group at Cornell University

The Boyce Thompson Institute (previously: Boyce Thompson Institute for Plant Research) is an independent research institute devoted to using plant sciences to improve agriculture, protect the environment, and enhance human health. The Boyce Thompson Institute (BTI) is located on the campus of Cornell University in Ithaca, New York, United States, and is fully integrated in the research infrastructure of the university. Faculty at BTI are members of several Cornell Departments, including Plant Biology, Chemistry & Chemical Biology, Molecular Biology & Genetics, as well as Plant Pathology and Plant-Microbe Biology. BTI is governed by a board of directors, which is in part appointed by Cornell.

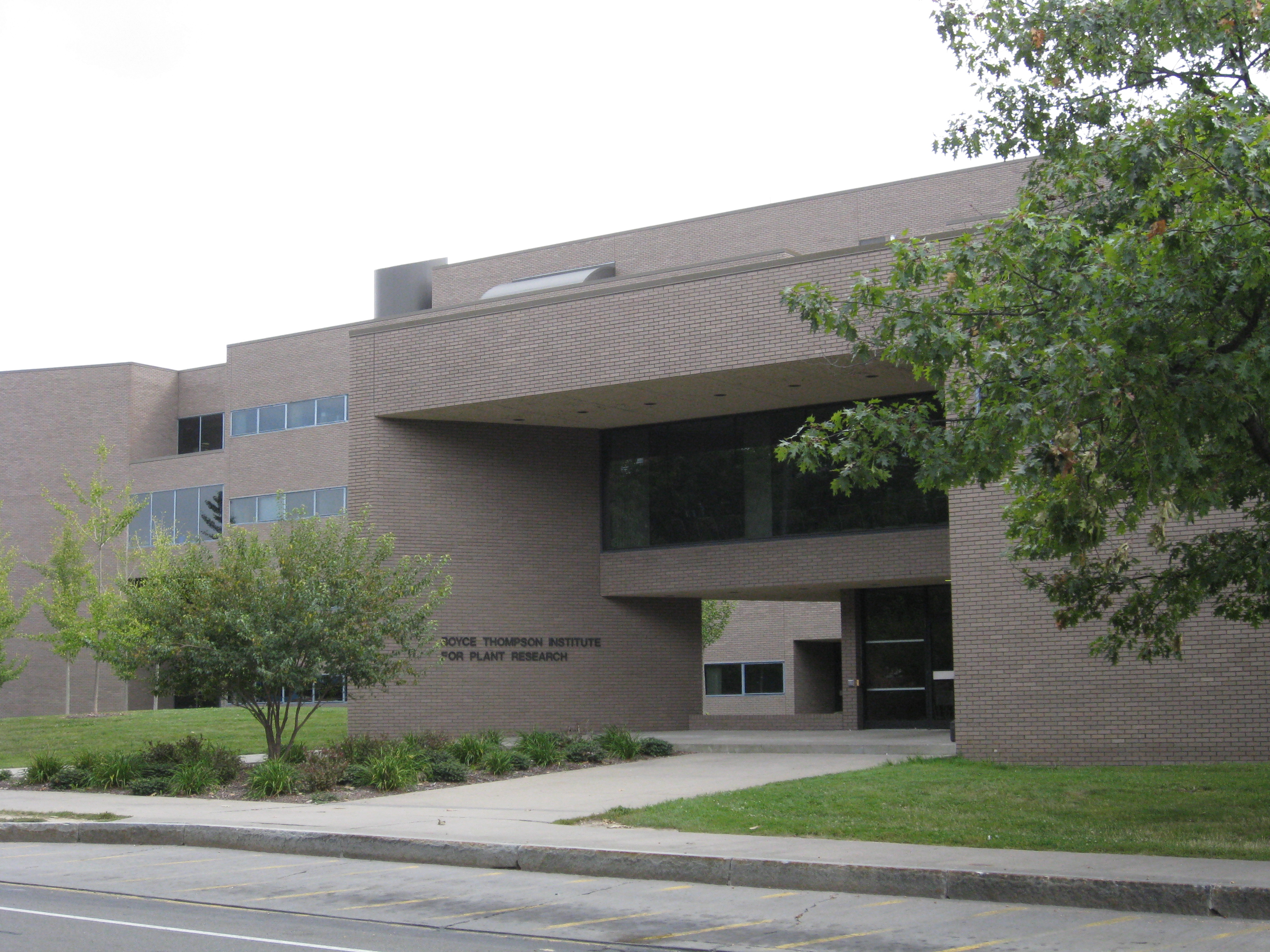
BTI main entrance

== History ==
William Boyce Thompson became wealthy from the copper mining industry and visited Russia in 1917, where he saw the effects of hunger on its people. This trip persuaded Thompson of the importance of ensuring food supply for the world population, and in 1920, he decided to establish the Institute for Plant Research. He wanted the institute to further the understanding of plants, to use this understanding for improving world food supply, and to promote conservation of natural areas.

The founding managing director was William Crocker, an associate professor of plant physiology at the University of Chicago who along with Herbert Hice Whetzel had been academic advisers to Thompson when he planned the institute.

=== Yonkers ===
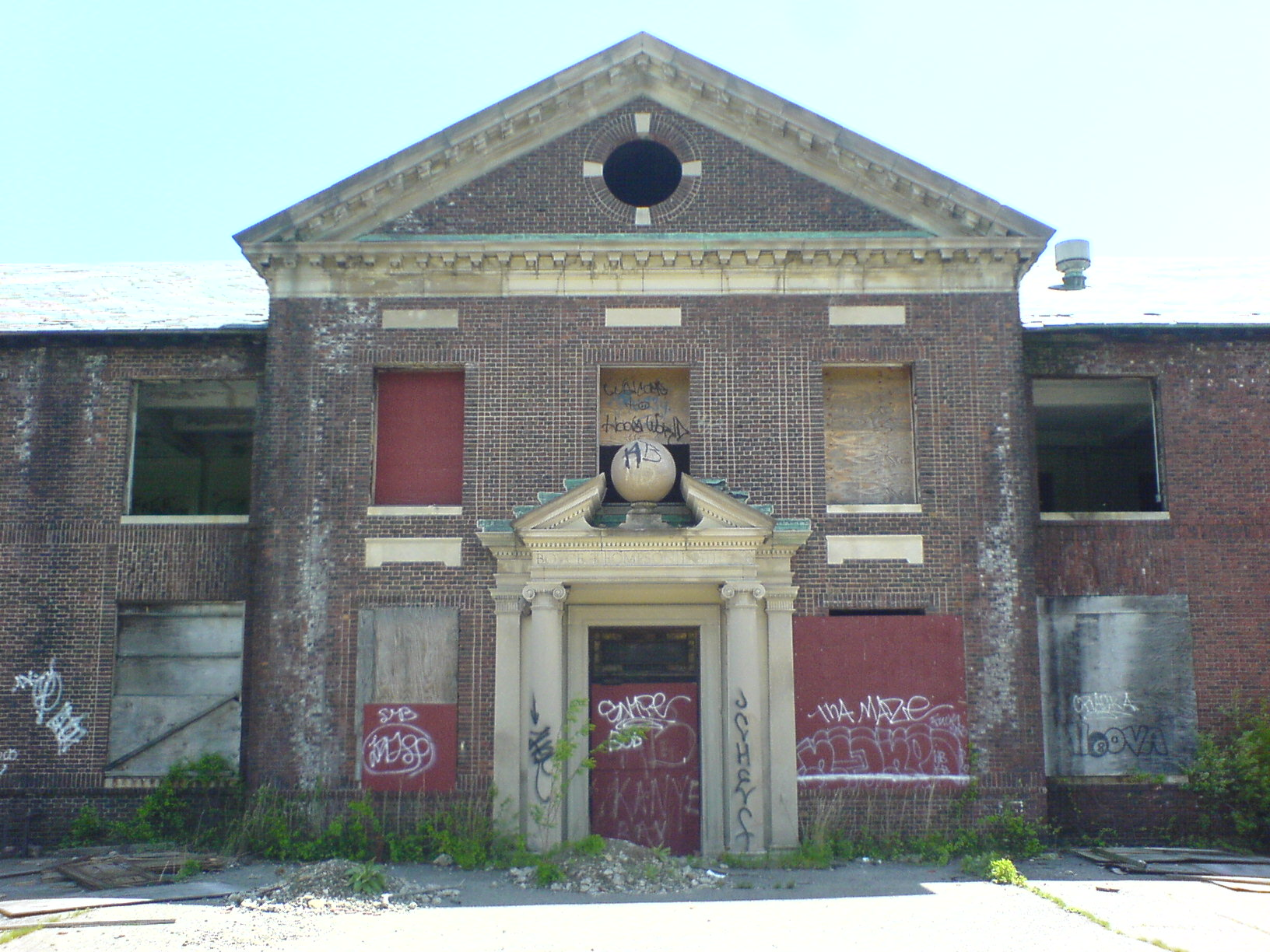
The Yonkers building in 2009

Thompson named the institute in honor of his parents, Anne Boyce Thompson and William Thompson, and endowed it with $10 million. Subsequently, the BTI has been funded by government support and revenues from the licensing of institute patents. Thompson played an active role in the early years of BTI and sought to encourage commercial development of the institute's research results. Therefore, rather than locating BTI on a university campus, Thompson built the laboratories in 1924 across the street from his country estate Alder Manor, in Yonkers, New York.

The Yonkers campus, used by BTI until the 1970s, was leased out for use as late as 1997, and then sold to the City of Yonkers Board of Education in 1999. In 2015 the city sold the property for $4.25 million to Simone Development Cos. As of 2015 the plans for the campus were to re-develop it into a mixed-use center with medical offices, restaurants and retail stores.

=== Cornell University ===
BTI remained on its Yonkers campus until the 1970s, when Yonkers property taxes and urban pollution posed major problems. Managing Director George L. McNew favored an affiliation with a major research university, and soon a 'bidding war' broke out between Oregon State University and Cornell University to attract BTI. The New York State Legislature wanted to keep BTI in New York and appropriated $8.5 million for construction of facilities on the Cornell campus if BTI agreed to stay. Oregon also appropriated funds as a relocation incentive. Ultimately, it was decided that affiliation with Cornell offered the most varied research opportunities.

In 1978 a new 116,854 sq ft (10,856.1 m^{2}) building designed by Ulrich Franzen was built next to the Cornell Veterinary School, and the move was made. Although affiliated with Cornell, the institute maintains its independence with a separate endowment, Board of Directors, business office, and employee benefits program. Close ties between BTI and Cornell foster collaborative relationships.

In 2015, in an effort to revamp the brand, the institute changed its name from Boyce Thompson Institute of Plant Research to Boyce Thompson Institute (BTI).

== Programs ==
Faculty investigators at BTI conduct research on plants and other organisms, train postdoctoral fellows, graduate students and undergraduates, and teach classes through adjunct appointments at Cornell University. Current faculty members at BTI are: Gary Blissard, Carmen Catala, Zhangjun Fei, Jim Giovannoni, Maria Harrison, Georg Jander, Magda Julkowska, Fay-Wei Li, Greg Martin, Lukas Mueller, Andrew Nelson, Eric Richards, Frank Schroeder, Aleksandra Skirycz, David Stern, and Joyce Van Eck.

The Scientist magazine survey of post doctoral fellows ranked BTI the 12th best place to work. For example, BTI is part of the consortium that is sequencing the tomato genome and creating a database of genomic sequences and information on the tomato and related plants.

Each summer, BTI's 10-week Plant Genome Research Experience for Undergraduates program enables undergraduates selected nationally to conduct individual research. BTI also runs after-school science enrichment programs at local grade schools.

BTI's research facilities, including the BTI Mass Spectrometry Facility and the Plant Cell Imaging Center, are available to researchers from Cornell University and SUNY Cortland.

== Technology transfer ==
=== HighFive ===
The HighFive cell line was originally developed at BTI. The cell line and its virus-free sub-clones remain the sole property of BTI. The High Five cells have been used to produce the VLP-based HPV vaccine Cervarix.

== See also ==
- Boyce Thompson Arboretum State Park - Sonoran Desert arboretum in Arizona.
