= Barbara McClintock =

American scientist and cytogeneticist (1902–1992)

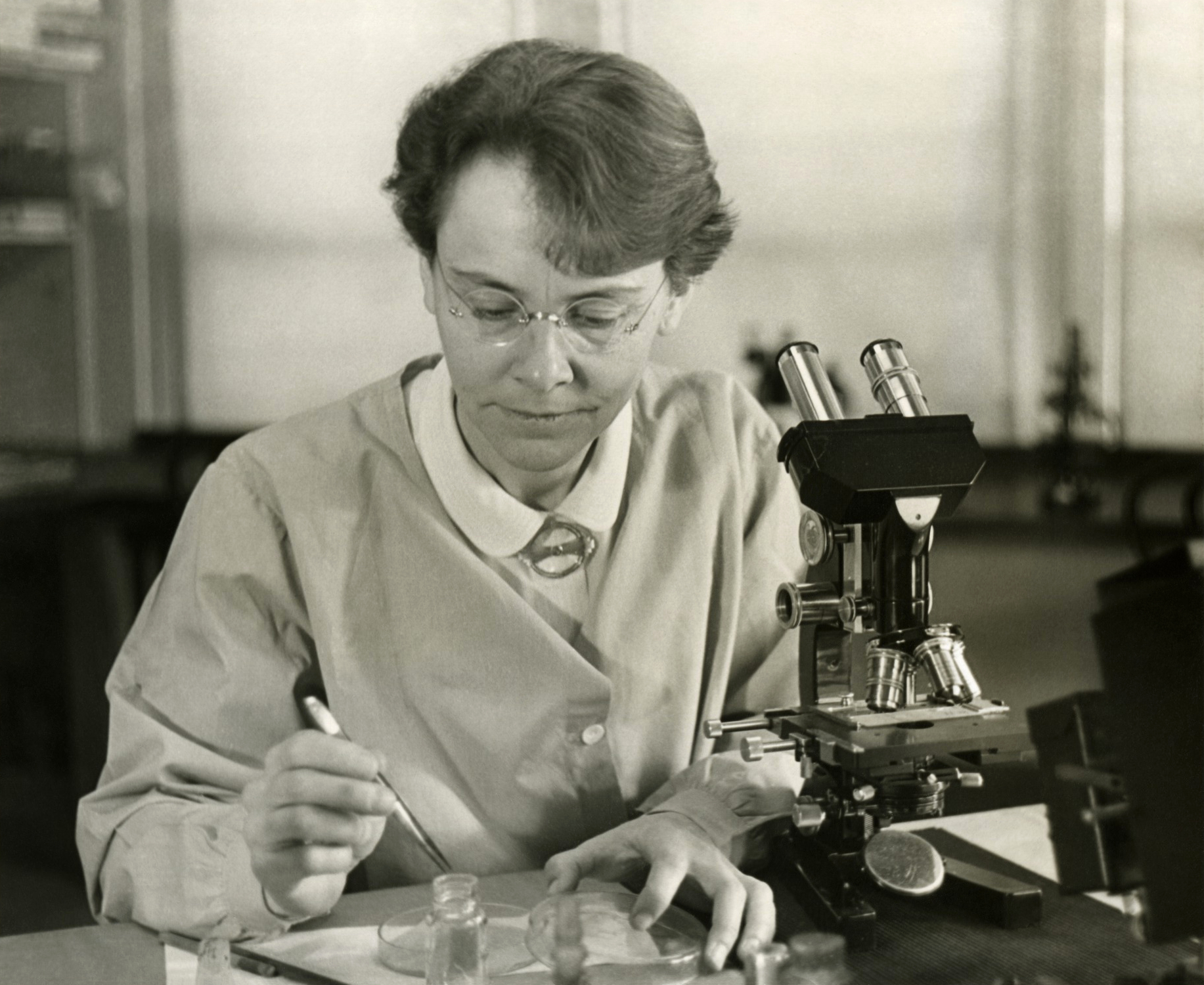
- McClintock in her laboratory, 1947
- Born: Eleanor McClintock; June 16, 1902; Hartford, Connecticut, United States
- Died: September 2, 1992 (aged 90); Huntington, New York, United States
- Education: Cornell University (BS, MS, PhD)
- Known for: Work in genetic structure of maize Breakage-fusion-bridge cycle Chromosomal crossover DNA transposon Mobile genetic elements Transposase; Transposable element
- Awards: National Medal of Science (1970); Thomas Hunt Morgan Medal (1981); Wolf Prize in Medicine (1981); Louisa Gross Horwitz Prize (1982); Nobel Prize in Physiology or Medicine (1983)
- Scientific career
- Fields: Cytogenetics (genetics scientist)
- Workplaces: University of Missouri; California Institute of Technology; Cold Spring Harbor Laboratory
- Thesis: A Cytological and Genetical Study of Triploid Maize (1927)

Barbara McClintock (June 16, 1902 – September 2, 1992) was an American cytogeneticist who was awarded the 1983 Nobel Prize in Physiology or Medicine. McClintock received her PhD in botany from Cornell University in 1927. There, she started her career as the leader of the development of maize cytogenetics, the focus of her research for the rest of her life. From the late 1920s, McClintock studied chromosomes and how they change during reproduction in maize. She developed the technique for visualizing maize chromosomes and used microscopic analysis to demonstrate many fundamental genetic ideas. One of those ideas was the notion of genetic recombination by crossing-over during meiosis—a mechanism by which chromosomes exchange information. She demonstrated the role of the telomere and centromere, regions of the chromosome that are important in the conservation of genetic information. She was recognized as among the best in the field, awarded prestigious fellowships, and elected a member of the National Academy of Sciences in 1944.

During the 1940s and 1950s, McClintock discovered transposons and used it to demonstrate that genes are responsible for turning physical characteristics on and off. She developed theories to explain the suppression and expression of genetic information from one generation of maize plants to the next. Due to skepticism of her research and its implications, she stopped publishing her data in 1953.

Later, she made an extensive study of the cytogenetics and ethnobotany of maize races from South America. McClintock's research became well understood in the 1960s and 1970s, as other scientists confirmed the mechanisms of genetic change and protein expression that she had demonstrated in her maize research in the 1940s and 1950s. Awards and recognition for her contributions to the field followed, including the Nobel Prize in Physiology or Medicine, awarded to her in 1983 for the discovery of genetic transposition; as of 2025, she remains the only woman who has received an unshared Nobel Prize in that category.

== Early life ==
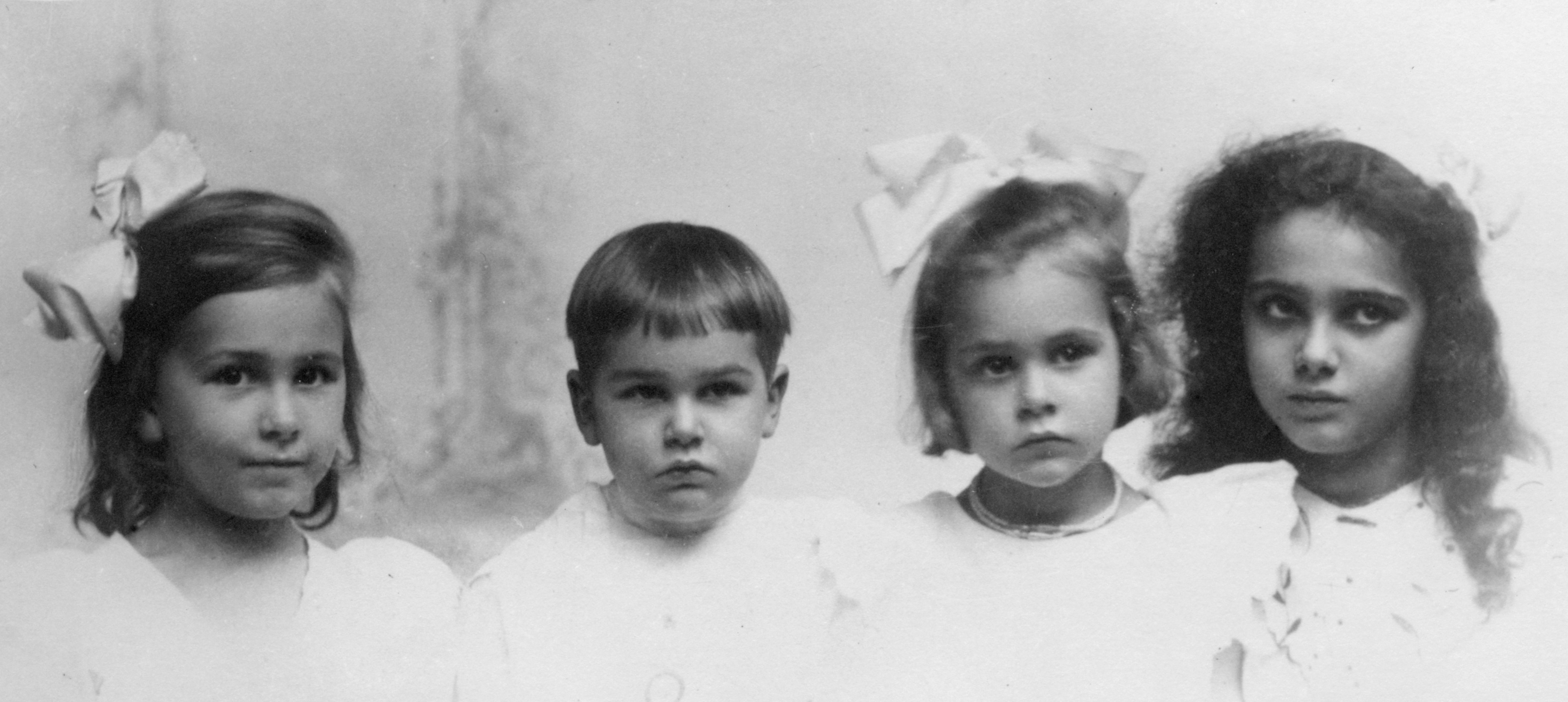
McClintock children, from left to right: Mignon, Malcolm Rider "Tom", Barbara and Marjorie

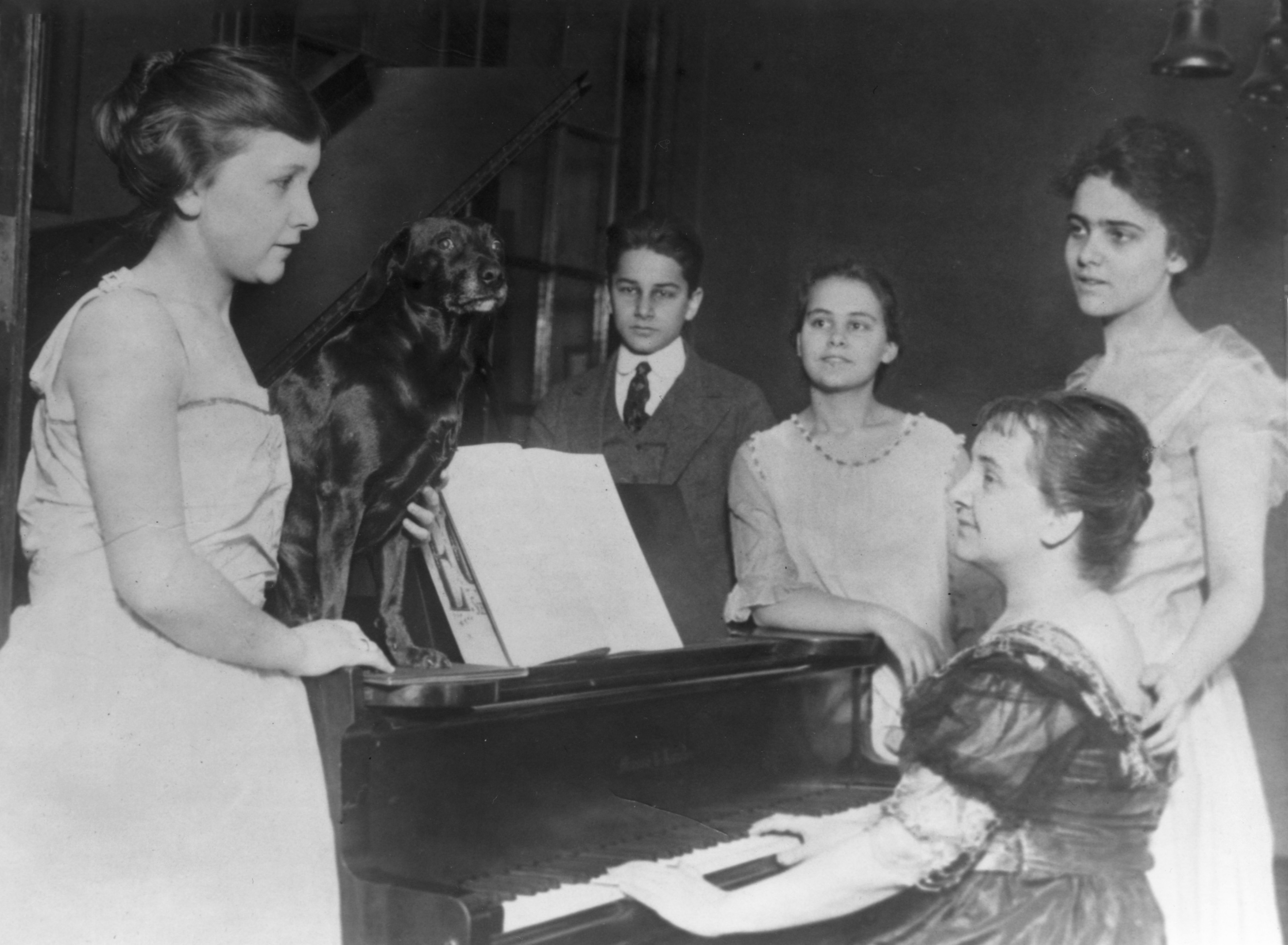
McClintock family, from left to right: Mignon, Tom, Barbara, Marjorie and Sara (at the piano)

Barbara McClintock was born Eleanor McClintock on June 16, 1902, in Hartford, Connecticut, the third of four children born to homeopathic physician Thomas Henry McClintock and Sara Handy McClintock. Thomas McClintock was the child of British immigrants. Marjorie, the oldest child, was born in October 1898; Mignon, the second daughter, was born in November 1900. The youngest, Malcolm Rider (called Tom), was born 18 months after Barbara. When she was a young girl, her parents determined that Eleanor, a "feminine" and "delicate" name, was not appropriate for her, and chose Barbara instead. McClintock was an independent child beginning at a very young age, a trait she later identified as her "capacity to be alone". From the age of three until she began school, McClintock lived with an aunt and uncle in Brooklyn, New York, in order to reduce the financial burden on her parents while her father established his medical practice. She was described as a solitary and independent child. She was close to her father, but had a difficult relationship with her mother, tension that began when she was young.

The McClintock family moved to Brooklyn in 1908 and McClintock completed her secondary education there at Erasmus Hall High School; she graduated in 1919. She discovered her love of science and reaffirmed her solitary personality during high school. She wanted to continue her studies at Cornell University's College of Agriculture. Her mother resisted sending McClintock to college for fear that she would be unmarriageable, a common attitude at the time. McClintock was almost prevented from starting college, but her father allowed her to just before registration began, and she matriculated at Cornell in 1919.

== Education and research at Cornell ==
Barbara McClintock (As Told By Jo Handelsman)

McClintock began her studies at Cornell's College of Agriculture in 1919. There, she participated in student government and was invited to join a sorority, but later broke her sorority pledge. Instead, McClintock took up music, specifically jazz. She studied botany, receiving a BSc in 1923. Her interest in genetics began when she took her first course in that field in 1921. The course was based on a similar one offered at Harvard University, and was taught by C. B. Hutchison, a plant breeder and geneticist. Hutchison was impressed by McClintock's interest, and telephoned to invite her to participate in the graduate genetics course at Cornell in 1922. McClintock pointed to Hutchison's invitation as a catalyst for her interest in genetics: "Obviously, this telephone call cast the die for my future. I remained with genetics thereafter." Although it has been reported that women could not major in genetics at Cornell, and therefore her MS and PhD—earned in 1925 and 1927, respectively—were officially awarded in botany, recent research has revealed that women were permitted to earn graduate degrees in Cornell's Plant Breeding Department during the time that McClintock was a student at Cornell.

During her graduate studies and postgraduate appointment as a botany instructor, McClintock was instrumental in assembling a group that studied the new field of cytogenetics in maize. This group brought together plant breeders and cytologists, and included Marcus Rhoades, future Nobel laureate George Beadle, and Harriet Creighton. Rollins A. Emerson, head of the Plant Breeding Department, supported these efforts, although he was not a cytologist himself.

She also worked as a research assistant for Lowell Fitz Randolph and then for Lester W. Sharp, both Cornell botanists.

McClintock's cytogenetic research focused on developing ways to visualize and characterize maize chromosomes. This particular part of her work influenced a generation of students, as it was included in most textbooks. She also developed a technique using carmine staining to visualize maize chromosomes, and showed for the first time the morphology of the 10 maize chromosomes. This discovery was made because she observed cells from the microspore as opposed to the root tip. By studying the morphology of the chromosomes, McClintock was able to link specific chromosome groups of traits that were inherited together. Marcus Rhoades noted that McClintock's 1929 Genetics paper on the characterization of triploid maize chromosomes triggered scientific interest in maize cytogenetics, and attributed to her 10 of the 17 significant advances in the field that were made by Cornell scientists between 1929 and 1935.

In 1930, McClintock was the first person to describe the cross-shaped interaction of homologous chromosomes during meiosis. The following year, McClintock and Creighton proved the link between chromosomal crossover during meiosis and the recombination of genetic traits. They observed how the recombination of chromosomes seen under a microscope correlated with new traits. Until this point, it had only been hypothesized that genetic recombination could occur during meiosis, although it had not been shown genetically. It is often reported that McClintock published the first genetic map for maize in 1931, showing the order of three genes on maize chromosome 9; however, it was her genetics professor C. B. Hutchison who has published the first genetic linkage maps for Chromosome 9 in 1921 and 1922. Her chromosome map showed that the arrangement of genes was consistent with the linkage map published by Hutchison in 1921. This information provided necessary data for the crossing-over study she published with Creighton; they also showed that crossing-over occurs in sister chromatids as well as homologous chromosomes. In 1938, she produced a cytogenetic analysis of the centromere, describing the organization and function of the centromere, as well as the fact that it can divide.

McClintock's breakthrough publications, and support from her colleagues, led to her being awarded several postdoctoral fellowships from the National Research Council. This funding allowed her to continue to study genetics at Cornell, the University of Missouri, and the California Institute of Technology, where she worked with E. G. Anderson. During the summers of 1931 and 1932, she worked at the University of Missouri with geneticist Lewis Stadler, who introduced her to the use of X-rays as a mutagen. Exposure to X-rays can increase the rate of mutation above the natural background level, making it a powerful research tool for genetics. Through her work with X-ray-mutagenized maize, she identified ring chromosomes, which form when the ends of a single chromosome fuse together after radiation damage. McClintock found the first ring chromosome in maize in 1931, but the first ring chromosome was first reported by Mikhail Sergeevich Navashin, who she cited in her first study with Stadler. From this evidence, McClintock hypothesized that there must be a structure on the chromosome tip that would normally ensure stability. She showed that the loss of ring-chromosomes at meiosis caused variegation in maize foliage in generations subsequent to irradiation resulting from chromosomal deletion. During this period, she demonstrated the presence of the nucleolus organizer region on a region on maize chromosome 6, which is required for the assembly of the nucleolus. In 1933, she established that cells can be damaged when nonhomologous recombination occurs. During this same period, McClintock hypothesized that the tips of chromosomes are protected by telomeres.

McClintock received a fellowship from the Guggenheim Foundation that made possible six months of training in Germany during 1933 and 1934. She had planned to work with Curt Stern, who had demonstrated crossing-over in Drosophila just weeks after McClintock and Creighton had done so; however, Stern emigrated to the United States. Instead, she worked with geneticist Richard B. Goldschmidt, who was a director of the Kaiser Wilhelm Institute for Biology in Berlin. She left Germany early amidst mounting political tension in Europe, returned to Cornell, but found that the university would not hire a woman professor. Legends such as the one cited here are based on undocumented evidence. Kass 2024 has evidence that McClintock worked at Cornell on her return to Cornell after spending only 5 months in Germany. Emerson hired her as his assistant in the Department of Plant Breeding where McClintock conducted independent research which led to a job offer as an assistant professor at the University of Missouri. In 1936, she accepted an Assistant Professorship offered to her by Lewis Stadler in the Department of Botany at the University of Missouri in Columbia. While still at Cornell, she was supported by a two-year Rockefeller Foundation grant obtained for her through Emerson's efforts.

== University of Missouri ==
During her time at Missouri, McClintock expanded her research on the effect of X-rays on maize cytogenetics. McClintock observed the breakage and fusion of chromosomes in irradiated maize cells. She was also able to show that, in some plants, spontaneous chromosome breakage occurred in the cells of the endosperm. Over the course of mitosis, she observed that the ends of broken chromatids were rejoined after the chromosome replication. In the anaphase of mitosis, the broken chromosomes formed a chromatid bridge, which was broken when the chromatids moved towards the cell poles. The broken ends were rejoined in the interphase of the next mitosis, and the cycle was repeated, causing massive mutation, which she could detect as variegation in the endosperm. This breakage–rejoining–bridge cycle was a key cytogenetic discovery for several reasons. First, it showed that the rejoining of chromosomes was not a random event, and second, it demonstrated a source of large-scale mutation. For this reason, it remains an area of interest in cancer research today.

Although her research was progressing at Missouri, McClintock was not satisfied with her position at the university. She recalled being excluded from faculty meetings, and was not made aware of positions available at other institutions. In 1940, she wrote to Charles Burnham, "I have decided that I must look for another job. As far as I can make out, there is nothing more for me here. I am an assistant professor at $3,000 and I feel sure that that is the limit for me." Initially, McClintock's position was created especially for her by Stadler, and might have depended on his presence at the university. McClintock believed she would not gain tenure at Missouri, even though according to some accounts, she knew she would be offered a promotion from Missouri in the spring of 1942. Recent evidence reveals that McClintock more likely decided to leave Missouri because she had lost trust in her employer and in the university administration, after discovering that her job would be in jeopardy if Stadler were to leave for Caltech, as he had considered doing. The university's retaliation against Stadler amplified her sentiments.

In early 1941, she took a leave of absence from Missouri in hopes of finding a position elsewhere. She accepted a visiting professorship at Columbia University, where her former Cornell colleague Marcus Rhoades was a professor. Rhoades also offered to share his research field at Cold Spring Harbor on Long Island. In December 1941, she was offered a temporary research position by Milislav Demerec, the newly appointed acting director of the Carnegie Institution of Washington's Department of Genetics at Cold Spring Harbor Laboratory. Although hesitant to make a long-term commitment, McClintock accepted the invitation and became a permanent member of the staff in 1943.

== Cold Spring Harbor ==
After her year-long temporary appointment, McClintock accepted a full-time research position at Cold Spring Harbor Laboratory. There, she was highly productive and continued her work with the breakage-fusion-bridge cycle, using it to substitute for X-rays as a tool for mapping new genes. In 1944, in recognition of her prominence in the field of genetics during this period, McClintock was elected to the National Academy of Sciences—only the third woman to be elected. The following year she became the first female president of the Genetics Society of America; she had been elected its vice-president in 1939. In 1944 she undertook a cytogenetic analysis of Neurospora crassa at the suggestion of George Beadle, who used the fungus to demonstrate the one gene–one enzyme relationship. He invited her to Stanford to undertake the study. She successfully described the number of chromosomes, or karyotype, of N. crassa and described the entire life cycle of the species. Beadle said, "Barbara, in two months at Stanford, did more to clean up the cytology of Neurospora than all other cytological geneticists had done in all previous time on all forms of mold." N. crassa has since become a model species for classical genetic analysis.

=== Discovery of controlling elements ===
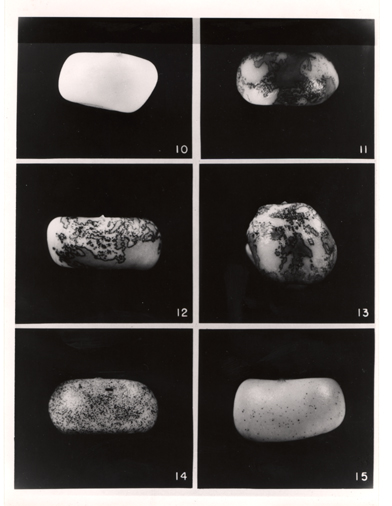
The relationship of Ac/Ds in the control of the elements and mosaic color of maize. The seed in 10 is colorless; there is no Ac element present, and Ds inhibits the synthesis of colored pigments called anthocyanins. In 11 to 13, one copy of Ac is present; Ds can move, and some anthocyanin is produced, creating a mosaic pattern. In the kernel in panel 14 there are two Ac elements, and in panel 15 there are three.

In the summer of 1944 at Cold Spring Harbor Laboratory, McClintock began systematic studies on the mechanisms of the mosaic color patterns of maize seed and the unstable inheritance of this mosaicism. She identified two new dominant and interacting genetic loci that she named Dissociation (Ds) and Activator (Ac). She found that the Dissociation did not just dissociate or cause the chromosome to break, it also had a variety of effects on neighboring genes when the Activator was also present, which included making certain stable mutations unstable. In early 1948, she made the surprising discovery that both Dissociation and Activator could transpose, or change position, on the chromosome.

She observed the effects of the transposition of Ac and Ds by the changing patterns of coloration in maize kernels over generations of controlled crosses, and described the relationship between the two loci through intricate microscopic analysis. She concluded that Ac controls the transposition of the Ds from chromosome 9, and that the movement of Ds is accompanied by the breakage of the chromosome. When Ds moves, the aleurone-color gene is released from the suppressing effect of the Ds and transformed into the active form, which initiates the pigment synthesis in cells. The transposition of Ds in different cells is random, it may move in some but not others, which causes color mosaicism. The size of the colored spot on the seed is determined by stage of the seed development during dissociation. McClintock also found that the transposition of Ds is determined by the number of Ac copies in the cell.

Between 1948 and 1950, she developed a theory by which these mobile elements regulated the genes by inhibiting or modulating their action. She referred to Dissociation and Activator as "controlling units"—later, as "controlling elements"—to distinguish them from genes. She hypothesized that gene regulation could explain how complex multicellular organisms made of cells with identical genomes have cells of different function. McClintock's discovery challenged the concept of the genome as a static set of instructions passed between generations. In 1950, she reported her work on Ac/Ds and her ideas about gene regulation in a paper entitled "The origin and behavior of mutable loci in maize" published in the journal Proceedings of the National Academy of Sciences. In summer 1951, she reported her work on the origin and behavior of mutable loci in maize at the annual symposium at Cold Spring Harbor Laboratory, presenting a paper of the same name. The paper delved into the instability caused by Ds and Ac or just Ac in four genes, along with the tendency of those genes to unpredictably revert to the wild phenotype. She also identified "families" of transposons, which did not interact with one another.

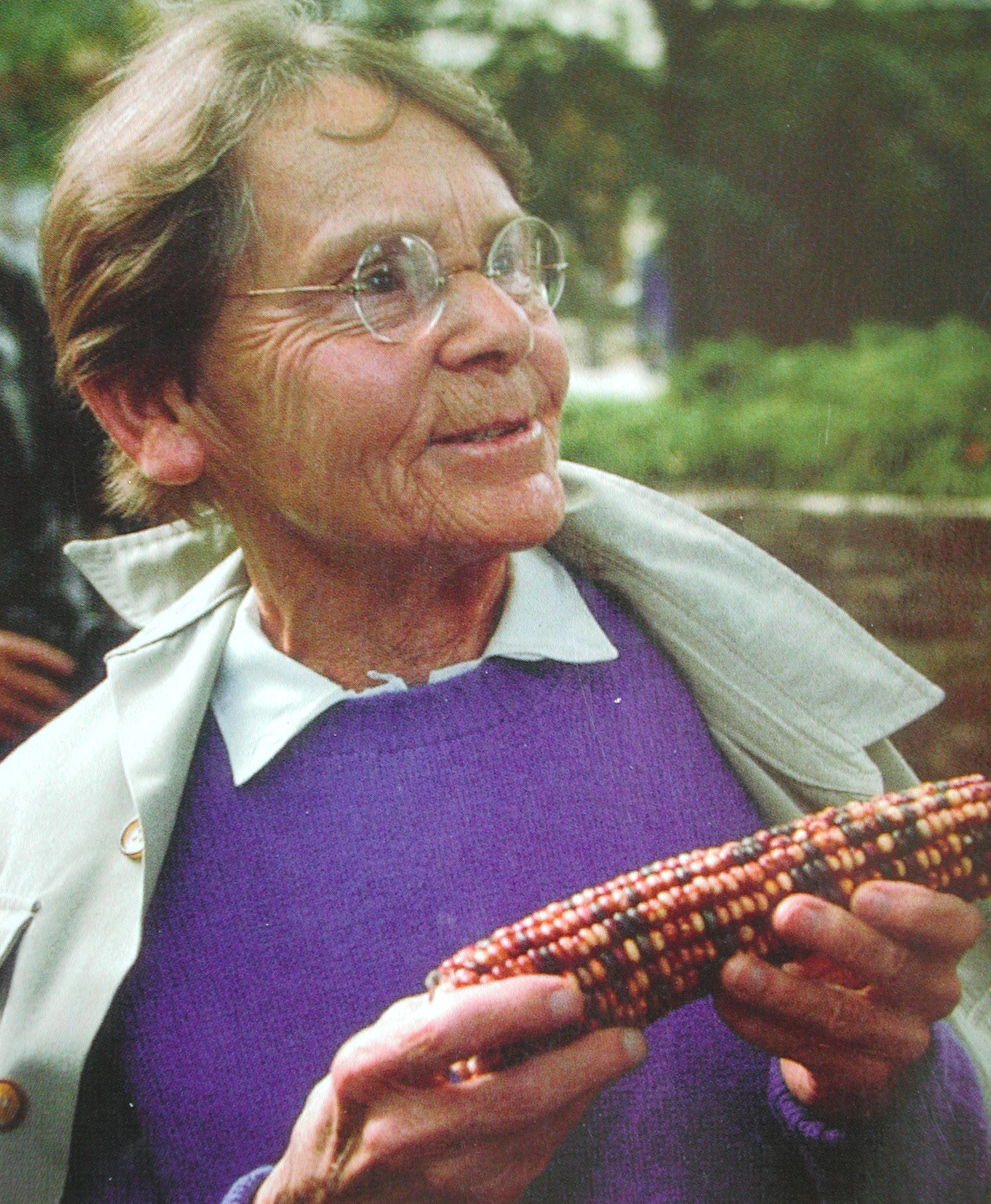
McClintock with one of her results

Her work on controlling elements and gene regulation was conceptually difficult and was not immediately understood or accepted by her contemporaries; she described the reception of her research as "puzzlement and, in some instances, hostility". Nevertheless, McClintock continued to develop her ideas on controlling elements. She published a paper in Genetics in 1953, where she presented all her statistical data, and undertook lecture tours to universities throughout the 1950s to speak about her work. She continued to investigate the problem and identified a new element that she called Suppressor-mutator (Spm), which, although similar to Ac/Ds, acts in a more complex manner. Like Ac/Ds, some versions could transpose on their own and some could not; unlike Ac/Ds, when present, it fully suppressed the expression of mutant genes when they normally would not be entirely suppressed. Based on the reactions of other scientists to her work, McClintock felt she risked alienating the scientific mainstream, and from 1953 was forced to stop publishing accounts of her research on controlling elements.

=== The origins of maize ===
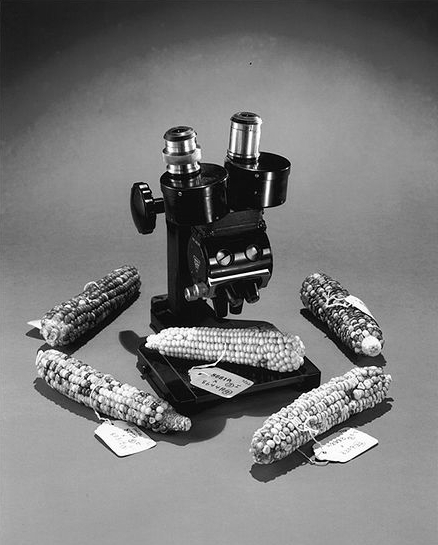
McClintock's microscope and ears of corn on exhibition at the National Museum of Natural History in Washington, D.C.

In 1957, McClintock received funding from the National Academy of Sciences to start research on indigenous strains of maize in Central America and South America. She was interested in studying the evolution of maize through chromosomal changes, and being in South America would allow her to work on a larger scale. McClintock explored the chromosomal, morphological, and evolutionary characteristics of various races of maize. After extensive work in the 1960s and 1970s, McClintock and her collaborators published the seminal study The Chromosomal Constitution of Races of Maize, leaving their mark on paleobotany, ethnobotany, and evolutionary biology. See Kass (2024, Chapter 9), for extensive details of McClintock's research and influence on the cytogenetics of the Races of Maize in Mexico and South America.

=== Rediscovery ===
McClintock officially retired from her position at the Carnegie Institution in 1967, and was made a Distinguished Service Member of the Carnegie Institution of Washington. This honor allowed her to continue working with graduate students and colleagues in the Cold Spring Harbor Laboratory as scientist emerita; she lived in the town. In reference to her decision 20 years earlier to stop publishing detailed accounts of her work on controlling elements, she wrote in 1973:

Over the years I have found that it is difficult if not impossible to bring to consciousness of another person the nature of his tacit assumptions when, by some special experiences, I have been made aware of them. This became painfully evident to me in my attempts during the 1950s to convince geneticists that the action of genes had to be and was controlled. It is now equally painful to recognize the fixity of assumptions that many persons hold on the nature of controlling elements in maize and the manners of their operation. One must await the right time for conceptual change.

The importance of McClintock's contributions was revealed in the 1960s, when the work of French geneticists François Jacob and Jacques Monod described the genetic regulation of the lac operon, a concept she had demonstrated with Ac/Ds in 1951. Following Jacob and Monod's 1961 Journal of Molecular Biology paper "Genetic regulatory mechanisms in the synthesis of proteins", McClintock wrote an article for American Naturalist comparing the lac operon and her work on controlling elements in maize. Even late in the twentieth century, McClintock's contribution to biology was still not widely acknowledged as amounting to the discovery of genetic regulation.

McClintock was widely credited with discovering transposition after other researchers finally discovered the process in bacteria, yeast, and bacteriophages in the late 1960s and early 1970s. During this period, molecular biology had developed significant new technology, and scientists were able to show the molecular basis for transposition. In the 1970s, Ac and Ds were cloned by other scientists and were shown to be class II transposons. Ac is a complete transposon that can produce a functional transposase, which is required for the element to move within the genome. Ds has a mutation in its transposase gene, which means that it cannot move without another source of transposase. Thus, as McClintock observed, Ds cannot move in the absence of Ac. Spm has also been characterized as a transposon. Subsequent research has shown that transposons typically do not move unless the cell is placed under stress, such as by irradiation or the breakage-fusion-bridge cycle, and thus their activation during stress can serve as a source of genetic variation for evolution. McClintock understood the role of transposons in evolution and genome change well before other researchers grasped the concept. Nowadays, Ac/Ds is used as a tool in plant biology to generate mutant plants used for the characterization of gene function.

== Honors and recognition ==
In 1947, McClintock received the Achievement Award from the American Association of University Women. She was elected a Fellow of the American Academy of Arts and Sciences in 1959. In 1967, McClintock was awarded the Kimber Genetics Award; three years later, she was given the National Medal of Science by Richard Nixon in 1970. She was the first woman to be awarded the National Medal of Science. Cold Spring Harbor named a building in her honor in 1973. She received the Louis and Bert Freedman Foundation Award and the Lewis S. Rosensteil Award in 1978. In 1981, she became the first recipient of the MacArthur Foundation Grant, and was awarded the Albert Lasker Award for Basic Medical Research, the Wolf Prize in Medicine and the Thomas Hunt Morgan Medal by the Genetics Society of America. In 1982, she was awarded the Louisa Gross Horwitz Prize from Columbia University for her research in the "evolution of genetic information and the control of its expression."

Most notably, she received the Nobel Prize for Physiology or Medicine in 1983, the first woman to win that prize unshared, and the first American woman to win any unshared Nobel Prize in the sciences. It was given to her by the Nobel Foundation for discovering "mobile genetic elements"; this was more than 30 years after she initially described the phenomenon of controlling elements. She was compared to Gregor Mendel in terms of her scientific career by the Swedish Academy of Sciences when she was awarded the Prize. Nobel Prize awards and their limitations, and the rationale for delayed awards are detailed in Kass (2024, pp. 236–247).

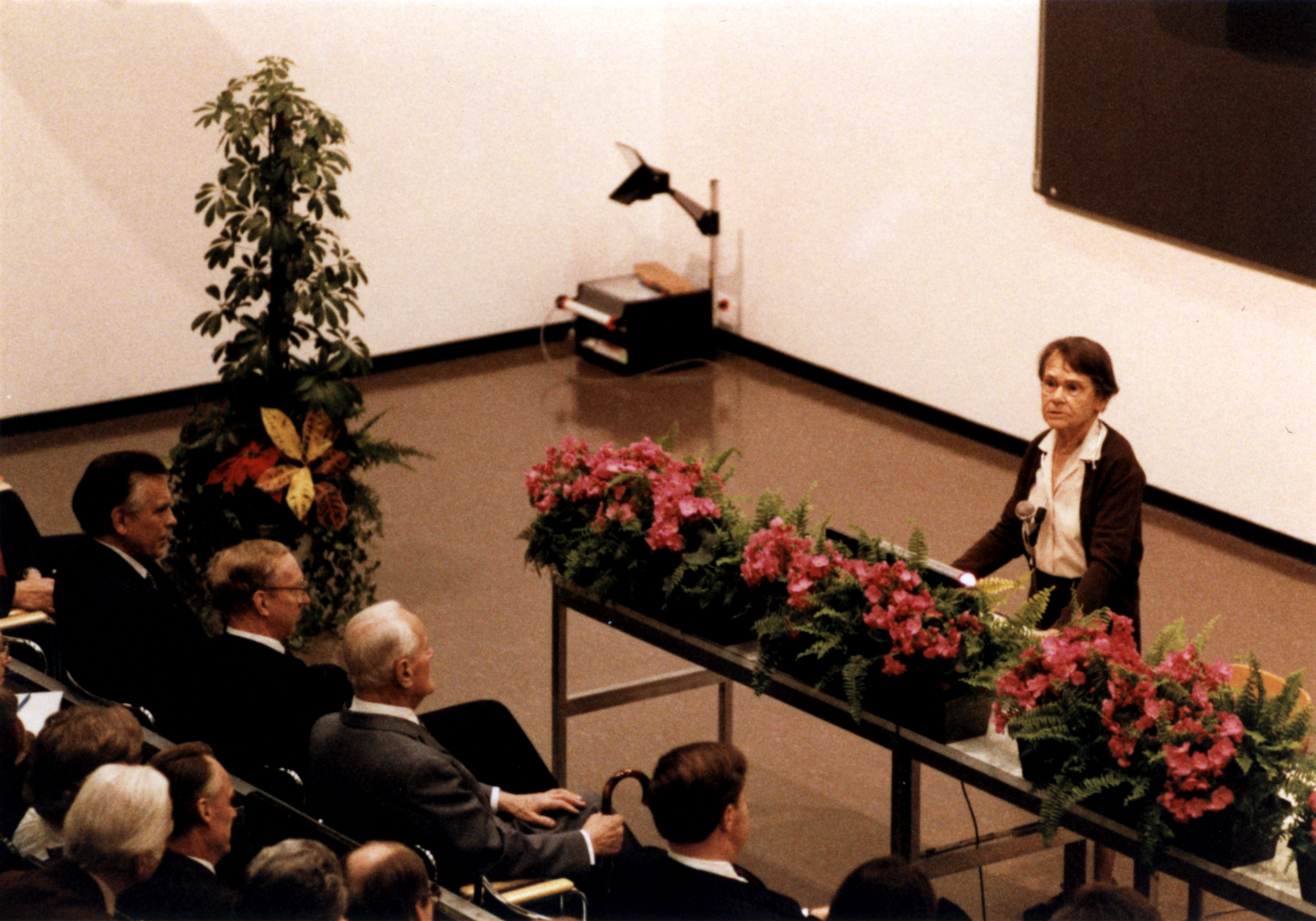
McClintock giving her Nobel Lecture

She was elected a Foreign Member of the Royal Society (ForMemRS) in 1989. McClintock received the Benjamin Franklin Medal for Distinguished Achievement in the Sciences of the American Philosophical Society in 1993. She had been previously elected to the APS in 1946. She was awarded 14 Honorary Doctor of Science degrees and an Honorary Doctor of Humane Letters. In 1986 she was inducted into the National Women's Hall of Fame. During her final years, McClintock led a more public life, especially after Evelyn Fox Keller's 1983 biography of her, A Feeling for the Organism, brought McClintock's story to the public. She remained a regular presence in the Cold Spring Harbor community, and gave talks on mobile genetic elements and the history of genetics research for the benefit of junior scientists. An anthology of her 43 publications The Discovery and Characterization of Transposable Elements: The Collected Papers of Barbara McClintock was published in 1987.

The McClintock Prize is named in her honor. Laureates of the award include David Baulcombe, Detlef Weigel, Robert A. Martienssen, Jeffrey D. Palmer and Susan R. Wessler.

In May 2005 the U.S. Postal Service issued a panel of first-class stamps honoring Barbara McClintock, along with Richard Feynman, Josiah Willard Gibbs, and John von Neumann.

In May 2024, a plant species, Stellaria mcclintockiae, was named after her.

== Later years ==
McClintock spent her later years, post Nobel Prize, as a key leader and researcher in the field at Cold Spring Harbor Laboratory on Long Island, New York. McClintock died of natural causes in Huntington, New York, on September 2, 1992, at the age of 90; she never married or had children.

== Legacy ==
McClintock was the subject of a 1983 biography by physicist Evelyn Fox Keller, titled A Feeling for the Organism. Keller argued that because McClintock felt like an outsider within her field, (in part, because of her sex) she was able to look at her scientific subjects from a perspective different from the dominant one, leading to several important insights. Keller shows how this led many of her colleagues to reject her ideas and undermine her abilities for many years. For example, when McClintock presented her findings that the genetics of maize did not conform to Mendelian distributions, geneticist Sewall Wright expressed the belief that she did not understand the underlying mathematics of her work, a belief he had also expressed towards other women at the time. In addition, geneticist Lotte Auerbach recounted that Joshua Lederberg returned from a visit to McClintock's lab with the remark: 'By God, that woman is either crazy or a genius.' " As Auerbach recounts, McClintock had thrown Lederberg and his colleagues out after half an hour 'because of their arrogance. She was intolerant of arrogance ... She felt she had crossed a desert alone and no one had followed her.'"

In 2001, a second biography, science historian Nathaniel C. Comfort's The Tangled Field: Barbara McClintock's Search for the Patterns of Genetic Control challenged this narrative. Comfort's biography contests the claim that McClintock was marginalized by other scientists, which he calls the "McClintock Myth" and argues was perpetuated both by McClintock herself as well as in the earlier biography by Keller. Comfort, however, asserts that McClintock was not discriminated against because of her gender, citing that she was well regarded by her professional peers, even in the early years of her career.

In 2024, From Chromosomes to Mobile Genetic Elements: The Life and Work of Nobel Laureate Barbara McClintock, a biography by Lee B. Kass, was released.

Many recent biographical works on women in science feature accounts of McClintock's work and experience. She is held up as a role model for girls in such works of children's literature as Edith Hope Fine's Barbara McClintock, Nobel Prize Geneticist, Deborah Heiligman's Barbara McClintock: Alone in Her Field and Mary Kittredge's Barbara McClintock. A recent biography for young adults by Naomi Pasachoff, Barbara McClintock, Genius of Genetics, provides a new perspective, based on the current literature.

On May 4, 2005, the United States Postal Service issued the "American Scientists" commemorative postage stamp series, a set of four 37-cent self-adhesive stamps in several configurations. The scientists depicted were Barbara McClintock, John von Neumann, Josiah Willard Gibbs, and Richard Feynman. McClintock was also featured in a 1989 four-stamp issue from Sweden which illustrated the work of eight Nobel Prize-winning geneticists. A laboratory building at Cold Spring Harbor Laboratory was named for her. A street has been named after her in the new "Adlershof Development Society" science park in Berlin.

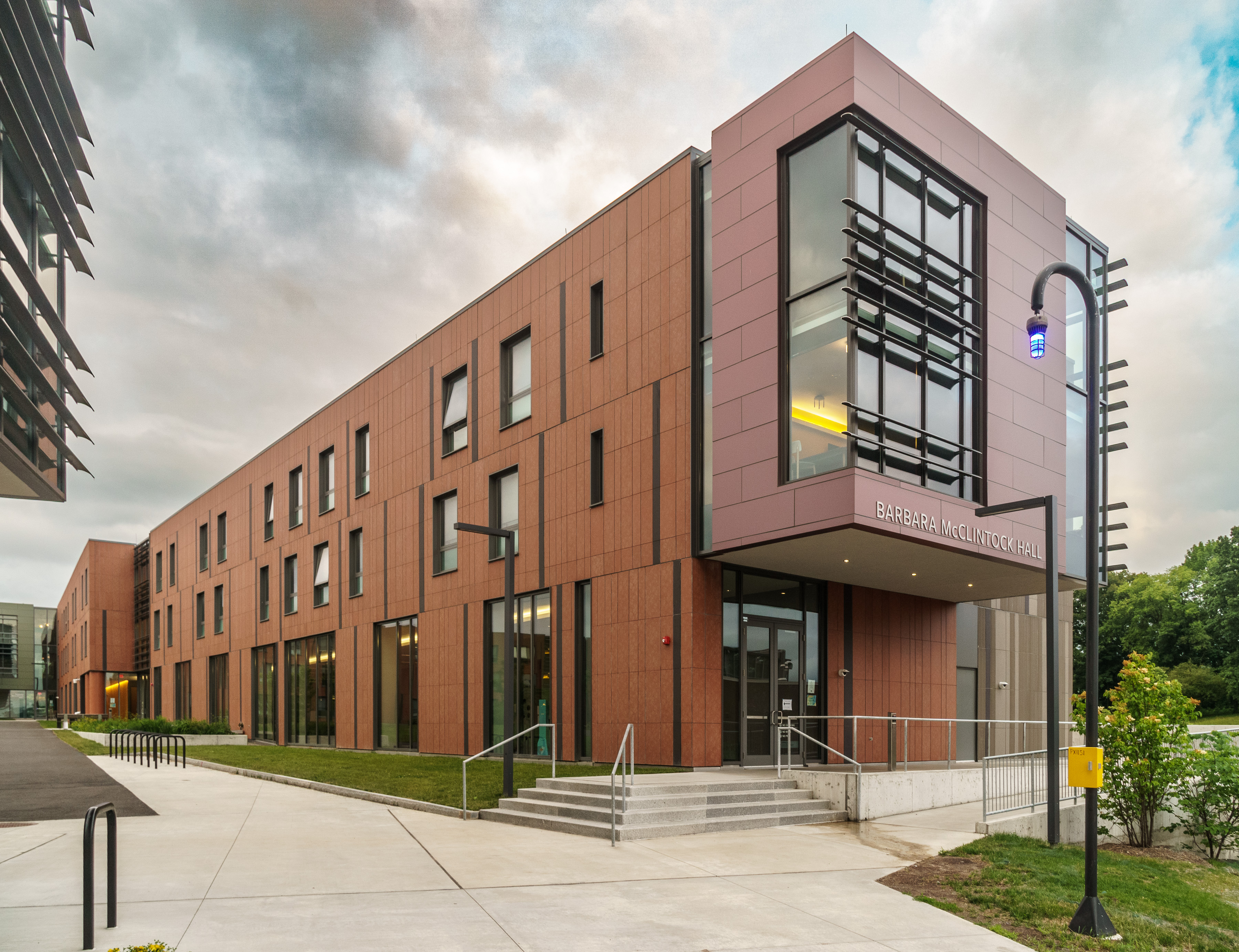
Barbara McClintock Hall at Cornell University

A 103,835 square-foot residence hall at Cornell University was named for McClintock in 2022.

Some of McClintock's personality and scientific achievements were referred to in Jeffrey Eugenides's 2011 novel The Marriage Plot, which tells the story of a yeast geneticist named Leonard who has bipolar disorder. He works at a laboratory loosely based on Cold Spring Harbor. The character reminiscent of McClintock is a reclusive geneticist at the fictional laboratory, who makes the same discoveries as her factual counterpart.

Judith Pratt wrote a play about McClintock, called MAIZE, which was read at Artemesia Theatre in Chicago in 2015, and was produced in Ithaca NY, the home of Cornell University, in February–March 2018.

McClintock’s life continue to inspire novels and essays that reinterpret her life through imaginative storytelling, reflecting her enduring influence on both science and culture. That includes Rachel Pastan’s novel, In the Field (2021), which the author describes as an imaginative re-creation of the scientist’s solitude, dedication, and unconventional career.

== Key publications ==
- McClintock, B. (1929). "A Cytological and Genetical Study of Triploid Maize". Genetics. 14 (2): 180–222. doi:10.1093/genetics/14.2.180. PMC 1201029. PMID 17246573.
- Creighton, H. B.; McClintock, B. (1931). "A Correlation of Cytological and Genetical Crossing-Over in Zea Mays". Proceedings of the National Academy of Sciences of the United States of America. 17 (8): 492–497. Bibcode:1931PNAS...17..492C. doi:10.1073/pnas.17.8.492. PMC 1076098. PMID 16587654.
- McClintock, B. (1931). "The Order of the Genes C, Sh and Wx in Zea Mays with Reference to a Cytologically Known Point in the Chromosome". Proceedings of the National Academy of Sciences of the United States of America. 17 (8): 485–491. Bibcode:1931PNAS...17..485M. doi:10.1073/pnas.17.8.485. PMC 1076097. PMID 16587653.
- McClintock, B. (1941). "The Stability of Broken Ends of Chromosomes in Zea Mays". Genetics. 26 (2): 234–282. doi:10.1093/genetics/26.2.234. PMC 1209127. PMID 17247004.
- McClintock, B. (1945). "Neurospora. I. Preliminary Observations of the Chromosomes of Neurospora crassa". American Journal of Botany. 32 (10): 671–678. doi:10.2307/2437624. JSTOR 2437624.
- McClintock, B. (1950). "The origin and behavior of mutable loci in maize". Proceedings of the National Academy of Sciences of the United States of America. 36 (6): 344–355. Bibcode:1950PNAS...36..344M. doi:10.1073/pnas.36.6.344. PMC 1063197. PMID 15430309.
- McClintock, B. (1953). "Induction of Instability at Selected Loci in Maize". Genetics. 38 (6): 579–599. doi:10.1093/genetics/38.6.579. PMC 1209627. PMID 17247459.
- McClintock, B. (1961). "Some Parallels Between Gene Control Systems in Maize and in Bacteria". The American Naturalist. 95 (884): 265–277. Bibcode:1961ANat...95..265M. doi:10.1086/282188. S2CID 56345866.
- McClintock, B.; Kato Yamakake, T.A.; Blumenschein, A. (1981). Chromosome constitution of races of maize: Its significance in the interpretation of relationships between races and varieties in the Americas. Chapingo, Mexico: Escuela de Nacional de Agricultura, Colegio de Postgraduados. OCLC 9181898.
- McClintock, B. (1984). "The Significance of Responses of the Genome to Challenge". Science. 226 (4676): 792–801. Bibcode:1984Sci...226..792M. doi:10.1126/science.15739260. PMID 15739260.

== See also ==
- Timeline of women in science
- Tietjen, Jill S.; Busch-Vishniac, Ilene; Busch, Lauren (2026). "Chapter 2. Barbara McClintock". Women Laureates 1970-2007: National Medal of Science and National Medal of Technology and Innovation Winners. Springer Nature. ISBN 978-3-032-23115-4.
