= Schnable =

Schnable is a surname. Notable people with the surname include:

- James Schnable, American plant geneticist
- Patrick Schnable, American plant geneticist
