= Michael Freeling =

American geneticist

- Born: January 14, 1945; Indiana
- Education: Indiana University Bloomington
- Awards: McClintock Prize (2017)
- Scientific career
- Fields: Genetics, Plant Biology
- Workplaces: University of California, Berkeley
- Thesis: (1973)
- Doctoral advisor: Drew Schwartz
- Website: http://freelinglab.berkeley.edu/

Michael Freeling is an American geneticist and plant biologist. He is currently a professor in the Department of Plant and Microbial Biology at the University of California. He is known for early work on maize anaerobic metabolism, developmental genetics of the maize ligule, proposing the grasses as a single genetic system model with Jeffrey Bennetzen, and the discovery of biased gene retention following whole genome duplications in plants. In 1994 Freeling was elected to the National Academy of Sciences. In 2017 he was awarded the McClintock Prize for Plant Genetics and Genome Studies.

== Education and career ==
Freeling was born in Fort Wayne, Indiana, United States in 1945. He attended the University of Oregon graduating with an A.B. in 1968. He then join Drew Schwartz's research group at the Indiana University Bloomington where he also worked with Marcus Rhoades. Completing his PhD in 1973 he was hired by the University of California, Berkeley as an Assistant Professor of Genetics. Freeling was promoted to Associate Professor in 1979, and to full professor in 1984. In 1980 he was selected as a Guggenheim Fellow which supported his time as a visiting professor at the Rothamsted Experimental Station, in England

== Research ==
=== Abiotic Stress ===
In the 1980 Freeling found an early response to anaerobic conditions is the suppression of the translation of mRNAs. After several hours a small group of anaerobic peptides including alcohol dehydrogenases are produced instead. He also found that the cytoplasmic acidosis was a good predictor of how poorly plants can tolerate flooding stress.

=== Comparative Genomics ===
Freeling and Jeffrey Bennetzen proposed the model of the grasses as a single genetic system. Freeling developed tools for identifying conserved non-coding sequences in plant genomes and has played a role in sequencing the genomes of papaya, sorghum, banana, Brassica rapa, pineapple and strawberry.

Freeling's research group also studies ancient whole genome duplications. He identified biased gene loss between duplicated regions of the arabidopsis genome. In maize they found that genes on the copy of the genome had lost more genes tended to be expressed at lower levels than duplicate copies of the same genes on the copy of the genome which had lost fewer genes.

== Trainees ==
Between 1973 and 2014 Freeling was the mentor for 27 PhD students and 49 postdocs, including four who went on to also be elected to the National Academy of Sciences.

- Julia Bailey-Serres Professor at University of California, Riverside and National Academy Member
- Jeffrey Bennetzen Professor at University of Georgia and National Academy Member
- Sarah Hake Professor at University of California, Berkeley and National Academy Member
- Robert A. Martienssen HHMI Investigator at Cold Spring Harbor Laboratory
- Neelima Sinha Professor at University of California, Davis
- James Schnable Professor at University of Nebraska–Lincoln
