= James Birchler =

American biologist

- Born: Red Bud, Illinois
- Education: Eastern Illinois University, Indiana University Bloomington
- Known for: Gene dosage, Minichromosomes
- Scientific career
- Fields: Genetics, Plant Biology, Cytology
- Workplaces: Harvard University, University of Missouri
- Thesis: "Biochemical studies on aneuploids of Zea mays L." (1977)
- Doctoral advisor: Drew Schwartz
- Website: ipg.missouri.edu/faculty/birchler.cfm

James Arthur Birchler is an American biologist who is currently Curators' Distinguished Professor at University of Missouri where he studies gene dosage, polyploidy, and cytogenetics in both maize and drosophila. In 2002 he was named a fellow of the American Association for the Advancement of Science and in 2011 he was elected to the National Academy of Sciences. In 2017 he was named the SEC Professor of the Year.

== Early life and education ==
Birchler was born on a farm near Red Bud, Illinois. He attended Eastern Illinois University where he initially majored in education and was mentored by ethnobotanist Charles Arzeni. After completing his degree at EIU in 1972, ultimately majoring in biology with a minor in zoology, he moved to Indiana University Bloomington where he studied maize dosage effects using B chromosomes with Drew Schwartz, graduating in 1977. Between 1978 and 1985 he worked as a postdoc studying gene dosage mechanisms in fruit flies, first at Oak Ridge National Laboratory with Ed Grell, and then at the University of California, Berkeley with Kenneth Paigen. In 1985 he was hired as an assistant professor at Harvard University, and in 1991 he moved to the University of Missouri.

== Research ==
Birchler is known for his contributions to the study of gene dosage, dosage compensation, and gene balance using both maize (Zea mays) and fruit flies (Drosophila melanogaster) as model organisms. He is also known for his lab's contributions to maize karyotyping by "chromosome painting" or fluorescence in situ hybridization. Birchler and his lab have also leveraged this tool and maize B-A chromosomal translocations to study the function and inactivation of centromeres. Birchler's lab also developed the first engineered minichromosomes in plants, by using telomere repeat sequences to truncate B chromosomes in maize. James A. Birchler also developed Fast-Flowering Mini-Maize as a small, rapid-cycling model for maize.

== Recognition ==
- 2002 Fellow of the American Association for the Advancement of Science.
- 2011 Member of the National Academy of Sciences.
- 2014 Fellow of the National Academy of Inventors,
- 2014 Einstein Professor of the Chinese Academy of Sciences.
- 2016 Fellow of Academy of Science-St. Louis
- 2017 Fellow of the American Society of Plant Biologists
- 2017 SEC Professor of the Year.
- 2020 McClintock Prize for Plant Genetics and Genome Studies
