= Pastan =

Pastan is a surname. Notable people with the surname include:

- Ira Pastan (born 1931), American scientist
- Linda Pastan (1932–2023), American poet
- Rachel Pastan (born c. 1966), American novelist and educator
