= Neelima Sinha =

Indian-born American botanist

Neelima Roy Sinha
- Born: 26 March 1954 (age 72); New Delhi, India
- Education: University of California Berkeley
- Known for: The conserved role of homeobox genes in leaf development.
- Scientific career
- Fields: Plant genetics, Plant development
- Workplaces: University of California Davis
- Thesis: "Developmental analysis of the Knotted-1 mutant in Zea mays" (1990)
- Doctoral advisor: Sarah Hake

Neelima Roy Sinha (born March 26, 1954) is an American botanist. She is a professor at the University of California Davis.

== Early life and education ==
Neelima Sinha was born on March 26, 1954, in a small town near New Delhi, India. She earned her masters in Botany from Lucknow University in 1975 after which she worked for nine years as a bank manager before returning to academia, first moving to Waco, Texas in 1985 for a one year masters in environmental studies and then in 1986 entered the University of California, Berkeley, where she was the first student to join the lab of Sarah Hake, a maize geneticist at the Plant Gene Expression Center. At Berkeley, Sinha studied the knotted1 gene in maize and tomato, earning her PhD in 1991. After graduation, she received a postdoc fellowship from Pioneer Hi-Bred, which supported her work on maize and tomato genetics, working in a lab at Boston University, which otherwise focused on Drosophila.

== Career ==
In 1995, Sinha was offered, and accepted, an assistant professor position in the Department of Plant Biology at University of California, Davis. She continued her career at UC Davis, and is now a full professor in the Department of Plant Biology.

== Research ==
Sinha's research is in plant evolutionary developmental biology. Her early work examined the genes controlling leaf development, and she demonstrated that the KNOTTED-1 homeobox (knox1) gene regulates leaf formation in maize. Building on that work, she showed that knox genes are involved in determining leaf shape, and she uncovered additional genes involved in leaf development. She also conducts research on the molecular genetics of parasitic plants. In 2019, her work was profiled by the New Scientist.

== Honors ==
She was elected to be a fellow in the American Association for the Advancement of Science in 2005 and the American Society of Plant Biologists in 2018 Sinha has also been awarded the Jeanette Siron Pelton Award in 2016.
