= Robert A. Martienssen =

American geneticist

Rob Martienssen FRS
- Born: Robert Anthony Martienssen
- Education: University of Cambridge (BA, PhD)
- Known for: Work on transposable elements; Work on epigenetics
- Awards: Newcomb Cleveland Prize (2003); McClintock Prize (2018); EMBO Member (2010)
- Scientific career
- Fields: Plant Biology; Molecular Biology
- Workplaces: Cold Spring Harbor Laboratory
- Thesis: The molecular genetics of alpha-amylase gene families in wheat (Triticum aestivum L.). (1986)
- Doctoral advisor: David Baulcombe
- Website: www.cshl.edu/research/faculty-staff/rob-martienssen/

Robert Anthony Martienssen (born December 21, 1960) is a British plant biologist, Howard Hughes Medical Institute–Gordon and Betty Moore Foundation investigator, and professor at Cold Spring Harbor Laboratory, US.

== Education ==
Robert Martienssen attended Emmanuel College, Cambridge, completing his BA in 1982 and continuing on to his PhD in 1986 on the molecular genetics of alpha-amylase gene families in common wheat, supervised by David Baulcombe. He received an EMBO postdoctoral fellowship to travel to the University of California, Berkeley where he was a postdoctoral researcher with Michael Freeling from 1986 to 1988 where he showed that changes methylation of transposons could be associated with genetically heritable changes in the phenotype of corn plants. In 1989 he was hired as a principal investigator at Cold Spring Harbor Laboratory.

== Research and career ==
Martienssen has made major discoveries relating to the way plants control the expression of their genes. Working with maize, yeast and the weed Arabidopsis, he focuses on the chemical modifications to DNA that determine which genes are active — a process known as epigenetics.

Martienssen's work explains the effect on plants of ‘jumping genes’, or DNA transposable elements, reported in 1951 by Barbara McClintock, whom he worked alongside early in his career. He discovered that small pieces of RNA, in association with proteins of the Argonaute family, silence transposons in seeds so that gene expression remains stable from one generation to the next.

His work was cited by the journal Science as part of its Breakthrough of the Year: 2002 feature on small RNAs. He has extended his epigenetic studies from seeds to pollen, and his discoveries have implications for plant breeding — including hybrid cloning — and the development of biofuels.

== Awards ==
- Howard Hughes Medical Institute Investigator
- Newcomb-Cleveland Prize, American Association for the Advancement of Science in 2003
- Breakthrough of the Year, Science, 2002
- Elected a Fellow of the Royal Society in 2006
- Elected a member of European Molecular Biology Organization (EMBO) in 2010
- McClintock Prize for plant genetics in 2018
- The American Society of Plant Biologists Martin Gibbs Medal in 2019
- The Royal Society Darwin Medal in 2020
- The Genetics Society Medal in 2024
