= Microchromosome =

Type of chromosome

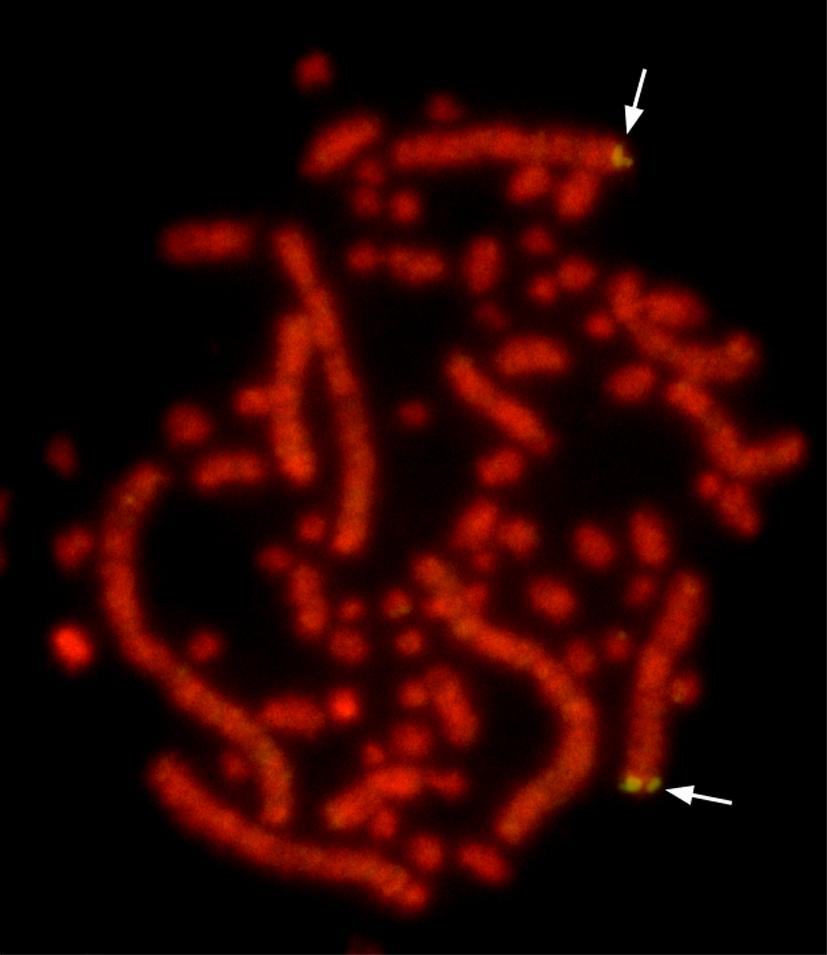
Image of chicken chromosomes featuring the many microchromosomes (appearing as dots). The arrows indicate a stained gene locus on homologous macrochromosomes.

A microchromosome is a chromosome defined for its relatively small size. They are typical components of the karyotype of birds, some reptiles, fish, amphibians, and monotremes. As many bird genomes have chromosomes of widely different lengths, the name was meant to distinguish them from the comparatively large macrochromosomes. The distinction referred to the measured size of the chromosome while staining for karyotype, and while there is not a strict definition, chromosomes resembling the large chromosomes of mammals were called macrochromosomes (roughly 3 to 6 μm), while the much smaller ones of less than around 0.5 μm were called microchromosomes. In terms of base pairs, by convention, those of less than 20Mb were called microchromosomes, those between 20 and 40 Mb are classified as intermediate chromosomes, and those larger than 40Mb are macrochromosomes. By this definition, all normal chromosomes in organisms with relatively small genomes (less than 100–200Mb) would be considered microchromosomes.

== Function ==
Microchromosomes are characteristically very small and often cytogenetically indistinguishable in a karyotype, which makes ordering and identifying chromosomes into a coherent karyotype particularly difficult. While originally thought to be insignificant fragments of chromosomes, in species where they have been studied they have been found to be rich in genes and high in GC content. In chickens, microchromosomes have been estimated to contain between 50 and 75% of all genes. During metaphase, they appear merely as 0.5–1.5 μm long specks. Their small size and poor condensation into heterochromatin means they generally lack the diagnostic banding patterns and distinct centromere locations used for chromosome identification.

== Occurrence ==
Microchromosomes are found in many vertebrates, but not in most mammals. Important comparisons were made using the genomic organization of the Florida lancelet – part of a sister group to all vertebrates – suggests that the ancestral amniote (and vertebrates in general) genome consisted entirely of microchromosomes. Comparison between lancelet and modern vertebrate chromosomes shows that the macrochromosomes were the result of fusion between ancestral microchromosomes. In addition, retention of microchromosomes is shown to be the norm; the complete loss of them in mammals is the outlier instead.

Relationship among mentioned organisms

- - Lancelet
  - Vertebrates
    - Garfish
    - - Lungfish
      - Tetrapods
        - Amphibians
        - Amniotes
          - Mammals
          - Reptiles
            - Lepidosaurs
              - Squamata (snakes, lizards)
            - A[...]formes
              - Turtles
              - Archosaurs
                - Crocodilians
                - Birds

== In birds ==
Chickens have a diploid number of 78 (2n = 78) chromosomes, and as is usual in birds, the majority are microchromosomes. Classification of chicken chromosomes varies by author. Some classify them as 6 pairs of macrochromosomes, one pair of sex chromosomes, with the remaining 32 pairs being intermediate or microchromosomes. Other arrangements such as that used by the International Chicken Genome Sequencing Consortium include five pairs of macrochromosomes, five pairs of intermediate chromosomes, and twenty-eight pairs of microchromosomes. Microchromosomes represent approximately one third of the total genome size, and have been found to have a much higher gene density than macrochromosomes. Because of this, it is estimated that the majority of genes are located on microchromosomes, though due to the difficulty in physically identifying microchromosomes and the lack of microsatellite markers, it has been difficult to place genes on specific microchromosomes.

Birds (except Falconidae) usually have karyotypes of approximately 80 chromosomes (2n = 80), with only a few being distinguishable macrochromosomes and an average of 60 being microchromosomes. They are more abundant in birds than any other group of animals. Chickens (Gallus gallus) are an important model organism for studying microchromosomes. Examination of microchromosomes in birds has led to the hypothesis that they may have originated as conserved fragments of ancestral macrochromosomes, and conversely that macrochromosomes could have arisen as aggregates of microchromosomes. Comparative genomic analysis shows that microchromosomes contain genetic information which has been conserved across multiple classes of chromosomes. This indicates that at least ten chicken microchromosomes arose from fission of larger chromosomes and that the typical bird karyotype arose 100–250 mya.

Replication timing and recombination rates have been found to differ between micro- and macrochromosomes in chickens. Microchromosomes replicate earlier in the S phase of interphase than macrochromosomes. Recombination rates have also been found to be higher on microchromosomes. Possibly due to the high recombination rates, chicken chromosome 16 (a microchromosome) has been found to contain the most genetic diversity of any chromosome in certain chicken breeds. This is likely due to the presence on this chromosome of the major histocompatibility complex (MHC).

For the many small linkage groups in the chicken genome which have not been placed on chromosomes, the assumption has been made that they are located on the microchromosomes. Groups of these correspond almost exactly with large sections of certain human chromosomes. For example, linkage groups E29C09W09, E21E31C25W12, E48C28W13W27, E41W17, E54 and E49C20W21 correspond with chromosome 7.

=== Turkey ===
The turkey has a diploid number of 80 (2n = 80) chromosomes. The karyotype contains an additional chromosomal pair relative to the chicken due to the presence of at least two fission/fusion differences (GGA2 = MGA3 and MGA6 and GGA4 = MGA4 and MGA9). Given these differences involving the macrochromosomes, an additional fission/fusion must also exist between the species involving the microchromosomes if the diploid numbers are valid. Other rearrangements have been identified through comparative genetic maps, physical maps and whole genome sequencing.

== In turtles ==
Microchromosomes play a key role in sex determination in soft-shelled turtles.

== In humans and other animals ==
Microchromosomes are absent from the karyotypes of mammals and some amphibians. (The monotreme platypus has an intermediate karyotype with smaller chromosomes that are not quite "micro".)

In rare cases, microchromosomes have been observed in the karotypes of individual humans. A link has been suggested between microchromosome presence and certain genetic disorders like Down syndrome and fragile X syndrome. The smallest chromosome in humans is normally chromosome 21, which is 47 Mb.

== See also ==
- Minichromosome
