= Computomics =

Biotechnology company

Computomics GmbH
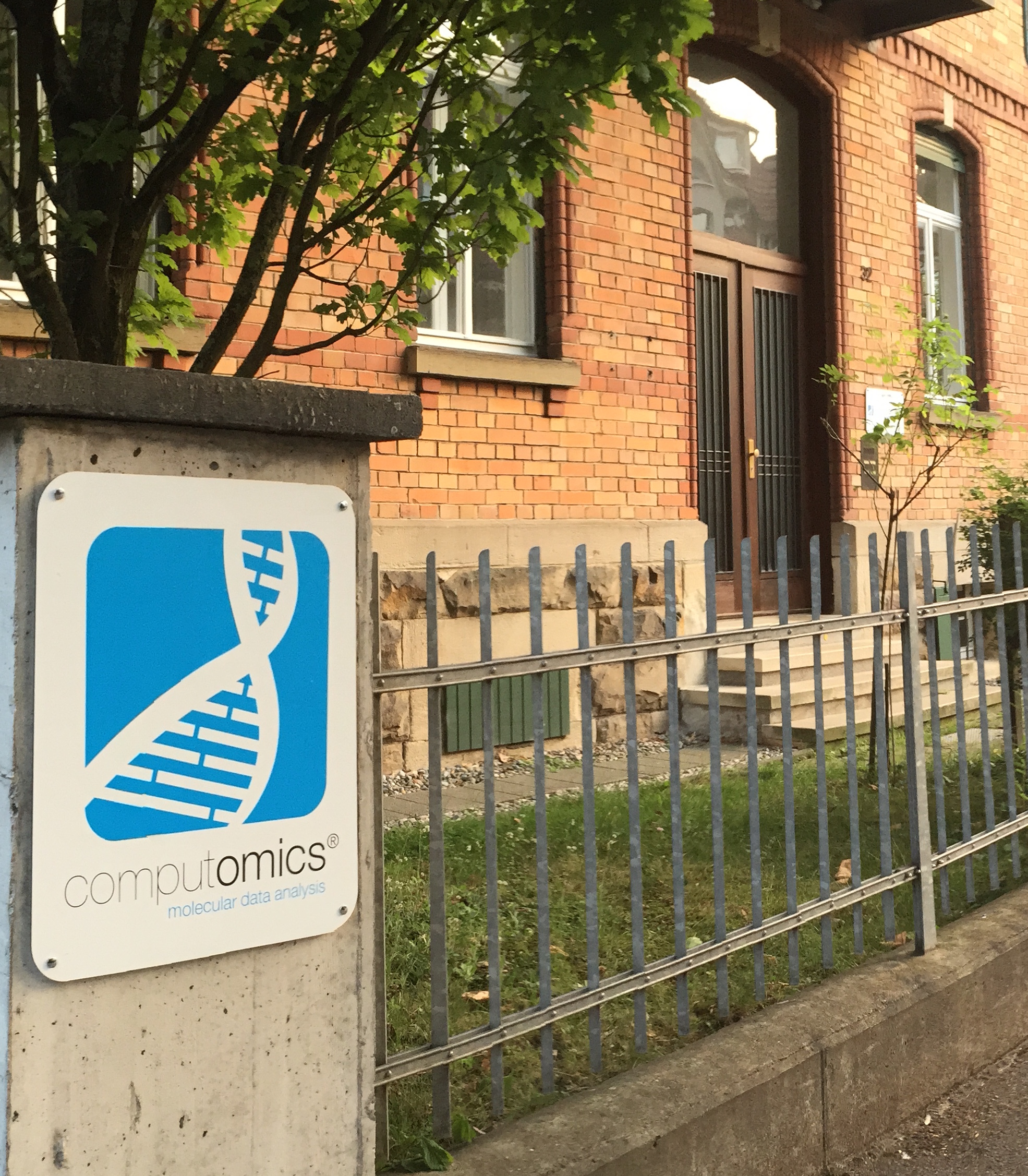
- Computomics' Headquarters in Tübingen, Germany
- Company type: Private
- Industry: Biotechnology
- Founded: Tübingen, Germany (October 23, 2012); Madison, Wisconsin, United States (April 22, 2016)
- Founder: Detlef Weigel; Sebastian J. Schultheiss; Gunnar Raetsch; Daniel Huson; Tobias Dezulian; Karsten Borgwardt
- Headquarters: Tübingen, Germany
- Number of locations: 3 offices (2016)
- Area served: Worldwide
- Key people: Sebastian J. Schultheiss (Managing Director)
- Services: Bioinformatics; Research; Plant Breeding and Phenotyping; Software
- Number of employees: (100)
- Subsidiaries: Computomics Corporation

Computomics is a biotechnology company co-founded by Detlef Weigel and MEGAN author, Daniel Huson. Computomics provides bioinformatics data analysis services for plant breeding and metagenomics analyses for plant protection.

== Overview ==
Computomics was founded in October 2012 after the enormous decline in price of genome sequencing brought on by Next generation sequencing. Six scientists from the Max Planck Institute for Developmental Biology, Friedrich Miescher Laboratory of the Max Planck Society and University of Tübingen noted that plant genome sequencing was now tenable, but data analysis would remain a bottleneck. Computomics has been featured in several nationwide publications, because it is one of very few companies focusing on plant breeding and plant genome analysis.

In September 2015, High-Tech Gründerfonds backed Computomics. In April 2016, Computomics opened offices for their subsidiary in the United States in Madison, Wisconsin and in Davis, California.

== Executives and scientific advisors ==
Sebastian J. Schultheiss is a co-founder as well as the Managing Director of Computomics. Schultheiss completed his undergraduate degree at the University of Tübingen with a year spent abroad at University of Michigan where he majored in Bioinformatics. Upon graduation, Schultheiss pursued his doctorate in Bioinformatics at the Friedrich Miescher Laboratory of the Max Planck Society under Gunnar Rätsch and Jan Lohmann.

Detlef Weigel is a Director of the Molecular Biology Department at the Max Planck Institute for Developmental Biology in Tübingen. Weigel co-founded Computomics and serves on the Scientific Advisory Board. Daniel Huson is a professor for Algorithms in Bioinformatics at the University of Tübingen and author of the metagenomics analysis software MEGAN.
