= Julia Bailey-Serres =

American geneticist

Julia Bailey-Serres is professor of genetics, director of the Center for Plant Cell Biology, and a member of the Institute for Integrative Genome Biology at the University of California, Riverside. Her accomplishments include the pioneering of methods for profiling the "translatomes" of discrete cell-types of plants and identification of a homeostatic sensor of oxygen deprivation in plants.

== Education ==
Bailey-Serres received her Bachelor of Science degree from the University of Utah in 1981 and earned a Ph.D. with a thesis entitled "Mitochondrial genome rearrangements in sorghum" from University of Edinburgh in 1986. She was a postdoctoral researcher at UC Berkeley under Michael Freeling.

== Career ==
=== Research ===
Bailey-Serres and her researchers are investigating the molecular and physiological processes that enable plants to tolerate or survive stresses such as flooding or drought. In general, her areas of research include:

- Gene regulation
- Translational control
- Abiotic stress signaling/response
- Low oxygen sensing
- Flooding/submergence
- Genomic technologies

In 2003, Bailey-Serres joined a team of geneticists including Pamela Ronald of the University of California, Davis and rice breeder David Mackill in the search for the Sub1A gene that allows rice to survive complete submergence under water. The gene is not present in all rice plants, but may be introduced through breeding.

As a result of this research, scientists at the International Rice Research Institute (IRRI) created the flood-tolerant rice variety Swarna-Sub1. More than 10 million farmers are growing the rice in their flood-prone fields.

=== Other activities ===
From 2005 to 2011, Bailey-Serres was the director of the National Science Foundation's Integrative Graduate Education and Research Trainee Program (IGERT). The program trained 23 Ph.D. students versed in cell biology, chemistry, computational sciences and engineering, in advanced chemical genomics.

She is a member of the editorial board for PNAS.

On November 21, 2022, Bailey-Serres was recognized on the list of Clarivate Analytic’s Highly Cited Researchers once again. She has been recognized annually since 2014.

== Awards and honors ==
- 2016 National Academy of Sciences Member
- 2011 Elected Secretary of the American Society of Plant Biologists (2012)
- 2010 Fellow of American Society of Plant Biologists
- 2009 World Technology Award Finalist (Environment - Individual)
- 2008 USDA National Research Initiative Discovery Award
- 2008 F.C. Donders Chair, Utrecht University, The Netherlands
- 2005 American Association for the Advancement of Science Fellow (AAAS)
- 2002 Outstanding Faculty Mentor, Chancellor's Award for Excellence in Undergraduate Research
