= Virginia Walbot =

American agriculturalist

Virginia Walbot (born 1946) is an American agriculturalist and botanist who is an emeritus professor in the Department of Biology at Stanford University. She investigates maize development with a focus on factors involved in male sterility.

== Life ==
Walbot first began working with corn when she used to help grow and sell it on her family's farm in Southern California.

In 1967, Walbot received a B.A. degree in biology at Stanford University. In 1969–1972, she attended Yale to work on embryogenesis, where she earned an M.Phil. and Ph.D. She completed a postdoctoral appointment at the University of Georgia in the laboratory of Leon Dure. She was a faculty member at Washington University in St. Louis from 1975 to 1980. During this period of her academic career, Walbot started working on maize genetics via collaborations with Ed Coe at the University of Missouri. In 1981, Walbot returned to Stanford as a professor in the Department of Biology.

In 1978, Walbot was invited by geneticist Barbara McClintock to visit her laboratory at Cold Spring Harbor Laboratory, where Walbot spent several weeks learning about maize genetics and transposable elements. A subsequent visit in 1982 further shaped Walbot’s research direction, contributing to her long-term focus on maize development, reproduction, and transposon biology.

Walbot participates in scientific societies including the American Society for Cell Biology, the American Association for the Advancement of Science (AAAS), the American Institute of Biological Sciences (AIBS), the Genetics Society of America, and International Society for Plant Molecular Biology.

She has published two books, Developmental Biology (1987), and The Maize Handbook (1993).

== Honors and awards ==
- Barbara McClintock Prize for Plant Genetics and Genome Studies, Maize Genetics Cooperation (2023)
- Recognized as a Pioneer Member of the American Society of Plant Biologists.
- Corresponding Member, Mexican Academy of Sciences (2004)
- Hageman Lectureship, Kansas State University (2001)
- Joan V. Wood Lectureship, Indiana University (1999)
- Explorer Award, National Geographic Society (1998)
- Eppley Award, Eppley Foundation (1993)
- Fellow, Guggenheim Foundation (1987)
- Belk Award, Miami University of Ohio (1985)
- Fellow, American Association for the Advancement of Science (1981)
- Postdoctoral Fellowship, NIH (1972–1975)
- Predoctoral fellowship, NSF (1969–1972)
