= Patrick J. Keeling =

Canadian biologist

Patrick Keeling
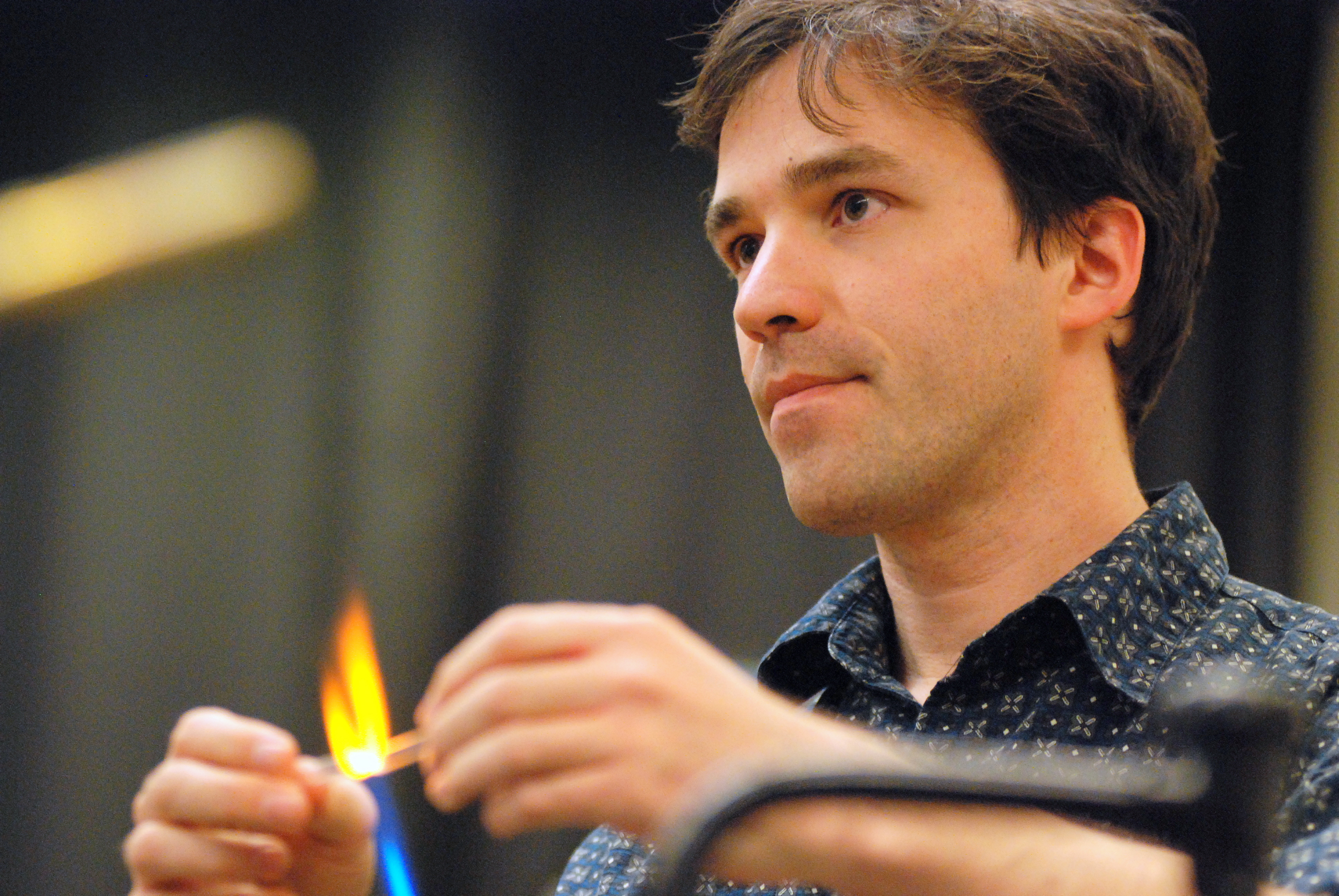
- Born: Patrick John Keeling; 1969 (age 56–57)
- Education: University of Western Ontario (BSc); Dalhousie University (PhD)
- Awards: Guggenheim Fellowship (2011); Gilbert Morgan Smith Medal (2021)
- Scientific career
- Fields: Evolution; Microbiology; Protists
- Workplaces: University of British Columbia; University of Melbourne; Indiana University Bloomington
- Thesis: Studies on the prokaryote-eukaryote transition (1996)
- Doctoral advisor: Ford Doolittle
- Other academic advisors: Jeffrey D. Palmer (postdoc)
- Website: www.botany.ubc.ca/people/patrick-keeling

Patrick John Keeling is a biologist and professor in the Department of Botany at the University of British Columbia. His research investigates the phylogeny, genomics and molecular evolution of protists and his work has led to numerous advances in assembling the eukaryotic tree of life. He has also identified several cases of horizontal gene transfer.
