= McClintock Prize =

Award for genetics research

The McClintock Prize for Plant Genetics and Genome Studies
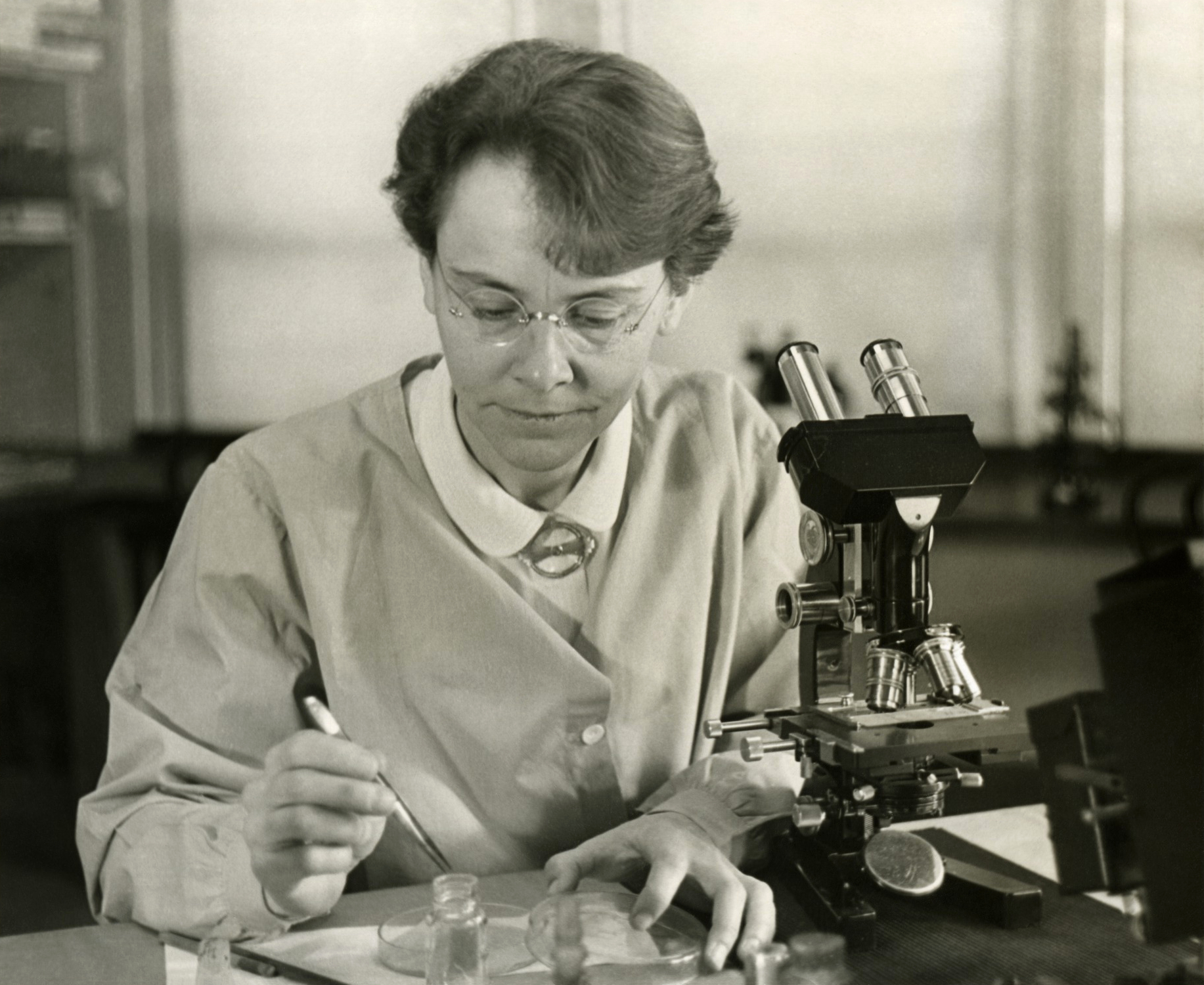
- Barbara McClintock in her laboratory
- Sponsored by: Jeffrey Bennetzen
- Website: www.maizegdb.org/community/awards/mcclintock

The McClintock Prize for Plant Genetics and Genome Studies is a prize awarded in genetics and genomics. The Prize is awarded by the Maize Genetics Executive Committee, and is presented to the Prize winner each spring at the Annual Maize Genetics Conference.

Named in honour of Barbara McClintock the award was founded in 2013 by Jeffrey Bennetzen, and funded by his royalties from the book Handbook of Maize. Bennetzen’s statement of the requirements for the award were that the recipient must be a currently active scientist who had made major contributions in both plant genetics and plant genome studies, that maize scientists receive the award no more than half the time, and that no one named Bennetzen should ever win the award. Bennetzen was the chair of the award selection committee for the first three years, but then the elected Maize Genetics Executive Committee took charge.

McClintock received the Physiology or Medicine Nobel Prize in 1983 for her work on maize genome structure, function and evolution, especially for her discovery and study of mobile DNA elements (aka jumping genes). She made major cytogenetic contributions to understanding chromosome breakage, gene regulation, recombination, centromere function, telomere function and genome rearrangement. In recognition of these contributions, prior to her transposable element research, she was elected one of the first female members of the US National Academy of Sciences (in 1944)

== Laureates ==
Laureates of the award include:

- 2027 Patrick Schnable, Iowa State University
- 2026 Joseph Ecker, Howard Hughes Medical Institute
- 2025 Edward S. Buckler IV, USDA-ARS
- 2024 Caroline Dean, John Innes Centre
- 2023 Virginia Walbot, Stanford University
- 2022 Robin Buell, University of Georgia
- 2021 John Doebley, University of Wisconsin
- 2020 James Birchler, University of Missouri
- 2019 Detlef Weigel, Max Planck Institute for Developmental Biology
- 2018 Robert A. Martienssen, Cold Spring Harbor Laboratory
- 2017 Michael Freeling, University of California, Berkeley
- 2016 Jeffrey D. Palmer, Indiana University Bloomington
- 2015 Susan R. Wessler, University of California, Riverside
- 2014 David Baulcombe, University of Cambridge

== See also ==
- List of genetics awards
