= Jeffrey Bennetzen =

American geneticist

Jeffrey Lynn Bennetzen
- Education: University of California, San Diego, University of Washington
- Scientific career
- Fields: Genetics
- Workplaces: Purdue University, University of Georgia
- Doctoral advisor: Benjamin Hall

Jeffrey Lynn Bennetzen is an American geneticist on the faculty of the University of Georgia (UGA). Bennetzen is known for his work describing codon usage bias in yeast, and E. coli; being the first to clone and sequence an active transposon in plants, discovering that most of the DNA in plant genomes was a particular class of mobile DNA (LTR-retrotransposons); solving the C-value paradox; proposing sorghum and Setaria as model grasses; showing that rice centromeres were hotspots for recombination, but not crossovers; and developing a technique to date polyploidization events. He is an author, with Sarah Hake of the book "Handbook of Maize." Bennetzen was elected to the US National Academy of Sciences in 2004.

== Education ==
After his 1970 graduation from Upland High School in Upland, California, he received his bachelor's degree in biology from the University of California, San Diego in 1974 and his doctoral degree in biochemistry from the University of Washington in 1980. He was a postdoctoral fellow from 1980 through 1981 on a joint project between Washington University in St. Louis, Stanford University and the University of California, Berkeley. From 1981 to 1983 he was a research scientist at the International Plant Research Institute.

== Career ==
In 1983, Bennetzen became an assistant professor at Purdue University, becoming a full professor in 1991 and H. Edwin Umbarger Distinguished Professor of Genetics in 1999. After two decades at Purdue, he joined the faculty at UGA in 2003 as a Professor of Genetics, Georgia Research Alliance Eminent Scholar, and Giles Chair in Molecular Biology and Functional Genomics. He was interim head of the Department of Genetics at UGA from 2009–2011. He is also an adjunct member of UGA's interdisciplinary Institute of Bioinformatics and Department of Plant Biology. He founded the Maize Genetics Executive Committee (2000) and the McClintock Prize (2014). From 2012–2016, he was a 1000 Talents Professor in the Chinese Academy of Sciences at the Kunming Institute of Botany. In 2016, he established labs at Anhui Agricultural University and the Yunnan Academy of Forestry to study the molecular genetics of tea (Camellia sinensis) and two Chinese native oil trees, Camellia oleifera and Malania oleifera.

== Research focuses ==
Bennetzen's research interests include plant genome structure/evolution and gene function relationships, transposable element (TE) biology, genetic diversity in under-utilized crops of the developing world, rapid evolution of complex disease resistance loci in plants, recombinational analysis, the coevolution of plant/microbe and plant/parasite interactions, the genetic basis of quality traits in tea and other important crops, and soil/root microbiomics. His lab was the first to clone an active TE from plants (1982); to show that classic disease resistance genes in plants are both recombinationally unstable and cell autonomous (1988); to use DNA probes from one grass species to map another genome (maize, sorghum), demonstrating genetic collinearity (1990); to show that DNA TEs preferentially insert into hypomethylated DNAs in or near genes (1995); to demonstrate that the majority of plant genomes is composed of LTR-retrotransposons (1996); to show the microcolinearity of plant genomes (1997), and the nature/rate/origin of exceptions to microcolinearity (1999); to explain the timing and mode of both plant genome expansion (1998) and contraction (2002); to show that plant centromeres are hot spots for recombination but not crossing over (2006); to show apparent site-directed recombination in plants (at a disease resistance gene) (2008); to use centromere gain/loss to determine the origin of plant chromosomes (in maize) (2012); to demonstrate a nuclear gain in a teosinte of about 2 Gb of DNA by TE amplification in less than 2 million years (2013); to demonstrate that errors in mismatch base repair may be the most common origin of DNA double strand breaks in plants (2014); to demonstrate domestication-associated changes in root and rhizosphere microbiomes (2018); and to develop the first universal technique to date the origins of allopolyploidy (2020).

== Education and honors ==
- Bachelor of Arts, Biology, Highest Honors, University of California, San Diego, 1974
- Ph.D., Biochemistry, University of Washington, 1980
- Presidential Young Investigator Award, National Science Foundation, 1986
- McKnight Foundation Award in Plant Biology, 1986
- Fulbright Awards, 1990 & 2008
- Sigma Xi Faculty Research Award, Purdue University, 1995
- Umbarger Endowed Professorship in Genetics, 1999
- Pandit Jawaharlal Nehru Centenary Professorship, University of Hyderabad, 2002
- Member, National Academy of Sciences, 2004
- Guggenheim Fellowship, 2008
- 1000 Overseas Talents Award, Chinese Academy of Sciences, 2012
- Lamar Dodd Creative Research Medal, University of Georgia, 2014
- Yunnan Province Overseas Talent Award, 2015
- Dist. Visiting Researcher Award, CSIRO, Australia, 2017
- Foreign Fellow of the Indian National Science Academy (INSA), 2020
