= Minichromosome =

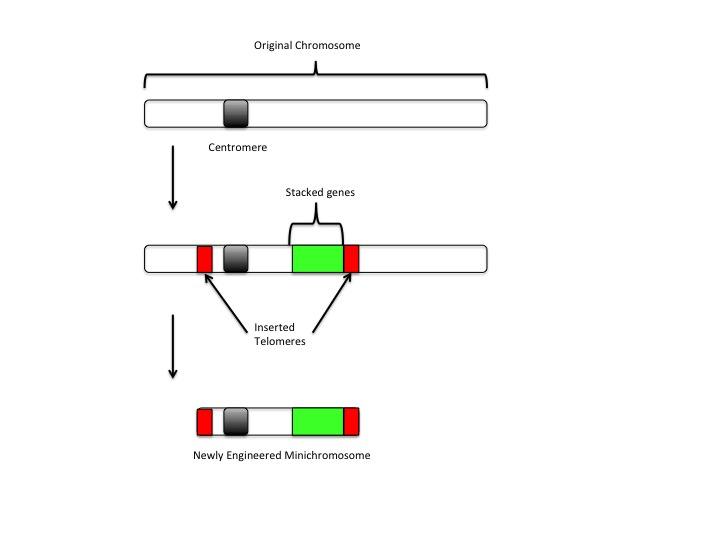
Through the insertion of multiple genes and telomeres, a shortened minichromosome is produced, which can then be inserted into a host cell

A minichromosome is a small chromatin-like structure resembling a chromosome that contains centromeres, telomeres, and replication origins, but relatively little additional genetic material. They replicate autonomously in the cell during cellular division. Minichromosomes may be created by natural processes as chromosomal aberrations or by genetic engineering.

== Structure ==
Minichromosomes can be either linear or circular pieces of DNA. By minimizing the amount of unnecessary genetic information on the chromosome and including the basic components necessary for DNA replication (centromere, telomeres, and replication sequences), molecular biologists aim to construct a chromosomal platform which can be utilized to insert or present new genes into a host cell.

== Production ==
Producing minichromosomes by genetic engineering techniques involves two primary methods, the de novo (bottom-up) and the top-down approach.

=== De novo ===
The minimum constituent parts of a chromosome (centromere, telomeres, and DNA replication sequences) are assembled by using molecular cloning techniques to construct the desired chromosomal contents in vitro. Next, the desired contents of the minichromosome must be transformed into a host which is capable of assembling the components (typically yeast or mammalian cells) into a functional chromosome. This approach has been attempted for the introduction of minichromosomes into maize for the possibility of genetic engineering, but success has been limited and questionable. In general, the de novo approach is more difficult than the top-down method due to species incompatibility issues and the heterochromatic nature of centromeric regions.

=== Top-down ===
This method utilizes the mechanism of telomere-mediated chromosomal truncation (TMCT). This process is the generation of truncation by selective transformation of telomeric sequences into a host genome. This insertion causes the generation of more telomeric sequences and eventual truncation. The newly synthesized truncated chromosome can then be altered through the insertion of new genes for desired traits. The top-down approach is generally considered as the more plausible means of generating extra-numerary chromosomes for the use of genetic engineering of plants. In particular it is useful because their stability during cell division has been demonstrated. The limitation of this approach is that it is labor-intensive.

== Role in genetic engineering ==
Unlike traditional methods of genetic engineering, minichromosomes can be used to transfer and express multiple sets of genes onto one engineered chromosome package. Traditional methods which involve the insertion of novel genes into existing sequences may result in the disruption of endogenous genes and thus negatively affect the host cell. Additionally, with traditional gene insertion methods, scientists have had less ability to control where the newly inserted genes are located on the host cell chromosomes, which makes it difficult to predict inheritance of multiple genes from generation to generation. Minichromosome technology allows for the stacking of genes side-by-side on the same chromosome thus reducing likelihood of segregation of novel traits.

=== Plants ===
In 2006, scientists demonstrated the successful use of telomere truncation in maize plants to produce minichromosomes that could be utilized as a platform for inserting genes into the plant genome. In plants, the telomere sequence is conserved, which implies that this strategy can be utilized to successfully construct additional minichromosomes in other plant species.

In 2007, scientists reported success in assembling minichromosomes in vitro using the de novo method.

The use of minichromosomes as a means for generating more desirable crop traits is actively being explored. Major advantages include the ability to introduce genetic information which is highly compatible with the host genome. This eliminates the risk of disrupting various important processes such as cell division and gene expression. With continued development, the future for use of minichromosomes may make a huge impact on the productivity of major crops.

=== Other organisms ===
Minichromosomes have also been successfully inserted into yeast and animal cells. These minichromosomes were constructed using the de novo approach.

== See also ==
- Minichromosome maintenance proteins
- Microchromosome
- Y chromosome, §Degeneration
