= Susan R. Wessler =

American biologist

Susan Wessler
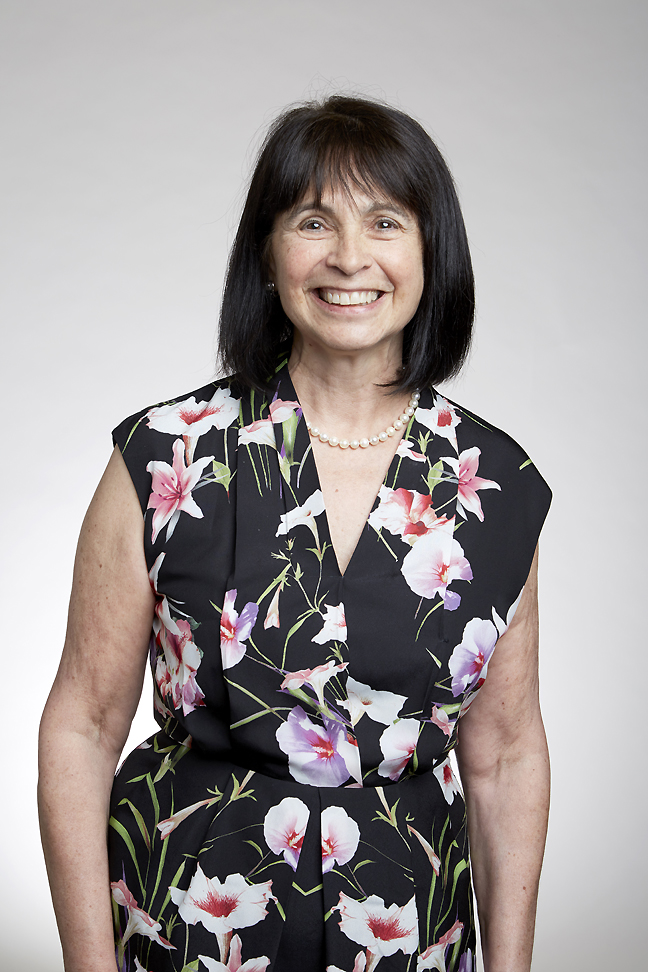
- Susan Wessler at the Royal Society admissions day in London, July 2017
- Born: Susan Randi Wessler; 1953 (age 72–73); New York City
- Education: State University of New York at Stony Brook; Cornell University
- Scientific career
- Workplaces: University of California, Riverside; Keck Graduate Institute
- Thesis: In vitro and in vivo expression of the leucine operon of Escherichia coli and Salmonella typhimurium (1980)
- Website: wesslerlab.ucr.edu

Susan Randi Wessler (born 1953, in New York City), ForMemRS, is an American plant molecular biologist and geneticist. She is distinguished professor of genetics at the University of California, Riverside (UCR).

== Education ==
Wessler graduated from the Bronx High School of Science in 1970. She received her bachelor's degree in 1974 in Biology from the State University of New York at Stony Brook and her Ph.D. in Biochemistry from Cornell University in 1980.

== Career and research ==
She was a postdoctoral research fellow at the Carnegie Institution of Washington in the Department of Embryology from 1980 to 1982. She joined the faculty at University of Georgia (UGA) in 1983 as an assistant professor of botany becoming a full professor in 1992. She was named distinguished research professor in 1994 and regents professor in 2005.

In 2006, Professor Wessler was named a Howard Hughes Medical Institute (HHMI) Professor. She is also a professor at large at the Keck Graduate Institute at the Claremont Colleges in Claremont, California.

Her research focuses on identifying plant transposable elements and determining how they contribute to gene and genome evolution. Her work has deciphered how transposable elements generate genetic diversity and attain high copy numbers without killing their host. Her laboratory demonstrated that elements could function as introns and that retrotransposons are the major cause of spontaneous insertion mutations in maize. In the genomics era her laboratory pioneered the computational analysis of transposable elements, culminating in the discovery of miniature inverted repeat transposable elements (MITEs), the element most frequently associated with plant genes. As a Howard Hughes Medical Institute (HHMI) Professor, Wessler adapted her research program for the classroom by developing the Dynamic Genome Program where incoming freshmen experience the excitement of scientific discovery.

=== Awards and honors ===
- Elected a Foreign Member of the Royal Society (ForMemRS) in 2017
- Elected member, American Philosophical Society (2013)
- Elected member, National Academy of Sciences (1998)
- Councilor, National Academy of Sciences (2004) and home secretary (2011)
- Elected fellow, American Association for the Advancement of Science (2006)
- Elected fellow, American Academy of Arts and Sciences (2007)
- American Society of Plant Biologists' Stephen Hales prize (2011)
- FASEB Excellence in Science Award (2012)
- McClintock Prize for Plant Genetics and Genome Studies (2015)
- HudsonAlpha Institute for Biotechnology Life Sciences Prize (2019)
