= Sarah Hake =

American plant biologist

Sarah Carter Hake PhD
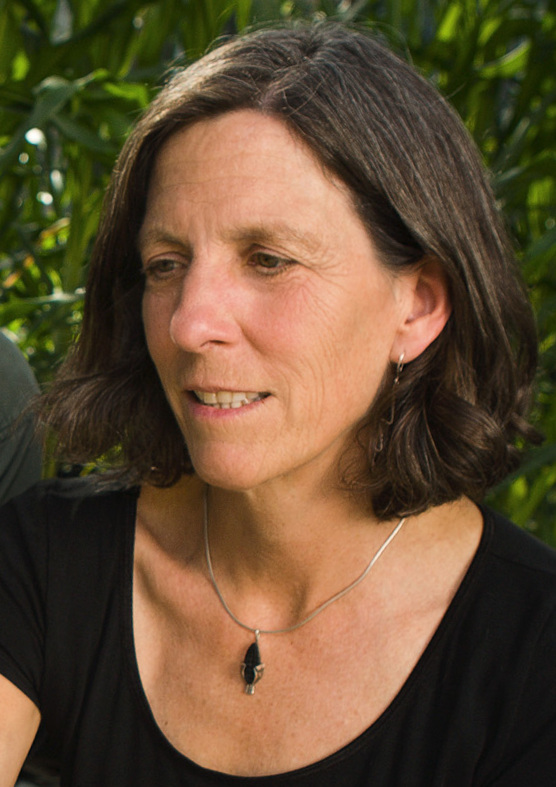
- Sarah Hake, in 2007.
- Education: Grinnell College; Washington University in St. Louis
- Known for: Cloning knotted1 a founding member of the homeobox gene family.
- Spouse: Don
- Awards: Stephen Hales prize
- Scientific career
- Fields: Plant Biology
- Institutions: USDA
- Thesis: The genome of Zea mays : its organization and homology to related grasses (1980)
- Doctoral advisor: Virginia Walbot
- Website: pgec.berkeley.edu/sarah-c-hake-lab

Sarah Hake is an American plant developmental biologist and the former director of the USDA's Plant Gene Expression Center in Albany, California. In 2009, she was elected a fellow of the American Association for the Advancement of Science and elected member of the National Academy of Sciences.

== Early life and education ==
Hake lived in Iowa until she was 10 years old and then moved to California. She attended Grinnell College, graduating in 1975. As an undergraduate, she accompanied a professor to the Botanical Garden in St. Louis, convincing her to study plant biology. After working as a waitress for a year after college, she was accepted into the PhD program at Washington University in St. Louis, where she completed her PhD with agriculturist Virginia Walbot. She studied, among other things, the proportion of the maize genome present as multiple copies of DNA. She met geneticist Michael Freeling when she was a graduate student and impressed by his research, which was considered outside the range of traditional genetic research at the time. Hake wrote an NIH proposal to work as a postdoc in his lab at the University of California, Berkeley cloning the gene ADH1. After cloning the ADH1 gene, Hake and Freeling wrote and received a second grant to clone the Knotted1 gene, which they succeeded in doing in 1989.

After completing her postdoc, she was hired as principal investigator at the USDA Plant Gene Expression Center in Albany, CA. Until 2020, she served as the director for the center and is an adjunct professor in the Department of Plant and Microbial Biology at the University of California, Berkeley. She retired in 2020 and is currently Adjunct Professor Emerita.

== Research ==
Hake considers her most important scientific contribution to be the cloning of Knotted1, the first cloned plant gene with an effect on development. Postdocs working in her lab have gone on to clone other genes controlling maize development, including terminal ear1, barren inflorescence2, fasciated ear2, tangled, and indeterminate spikelet1.

== Recognition ==
- In 2007, Hake received Stephen Hales prize from American Society of Plant Biologists.
- In 2009, Hake was elected a fellow of the American Association for the Advancement of Science.
- In 2009, Hake was elected to the National Academy of Sciences.

== Personal life ==
Hake had two children while she was a postdoc. Since she was a postdoc at UC-Berkeley, Hake and her family live on the Gospel Flat Farm near Bolinas, California.
