= Jeffrey D. Palmer =

American biologist

Jeff Palmer
- Born: Jeffrey Donald Palmer
- Education: Swarthmore College (BA); Stanford University (PhD)
- Awards: McClintock Prize (2016)
- Scientific career
- Fields: Molecular evolution; Molecular phylogenetics; Comparative genomics
- Workplaces: Indiana University Bloomington; Duke University; University of Michigan; Carnegie Institution for Science
- Thesis: Chloroplast DNA evolution : molecular and phylogenetic studies
- Doctoral advisor: Winslow Briggs
- Notable students: Patrick Keeling (postdoc); Kenneth Wolfe (postdoc); Mark Chase (postdoc)
- Website: biology.indiana.edu/about/faculty/palmer-jeffrey.html

Jeffrey Donald Palmer is a Distinguished Professor of Biology at Indiana University Bloomington.

== Education ==
Palmer was educated at Swarthmore College and completed his PhD at Stanford University on the evolution of chloroplast DNA supervised by Winslow Briggs in 1982.

== Career and research ==
Palmer's research investigates molecular evolution, molecular phylogenetics and comparative genomics. As of 2018 his laboratory studies the evolution of genes and genomes particularly in the chloroplast, mitochondrial DNA and during horizontal gene transfer.

His former doctoral students include Thomas D. Bruns, a Professor at the University of California, Berkeley. His former postdocs include Patrick J. Keeling, and Kenneth H. Wolfe, and Mark Wayne Chase.

=== Awards and honours ===
Palmer was awarded membership of the National Academy of Sciences in 2000 in recognition of his “distinguished and continuing achievements in original research” and the McClintock Prize in 2016 for his studies of plant genome structure, function and evolution. He was elected a Fellow of the American Academy of Arts and Sciences (FAAAS) in 1999.
