= Patrick Schnable =

American plant geneticist

Patrick S. Schnable
- Education: Cornell University (BS), Iowa State University (PhD)
- Known for: Maize B73 reference genome
- Scientific career
- Fields: Plant genetics
- Workplaces: Iowa State University
- Thesis: Genetic characterization of the Cy transposable element system at the Bz locus of Zea mays L. (1986)
- Doctoral advisor: Peter A. Peterson

Patrick S. Schnable is an American plant geneticist and holds the Iowa Corn Promotion Board Endowed Chair at Iowa State University where he also serves as the director the Plant Sciences Institute. Schnable led the publication of the first assembly of the maize genome in 2009. He is a Fellow of the American Association for the Advancement of Science and of the National Academy of Inventors.. He is a recipient of the McClintock Prize.

== Early life and education ==
Schnable has said that he decided he wanted to be a plant breeder at age 10 and that in high school he planted corn with differently colored kernels in his garden to try to work out how kernel color was inherited but it was "a disaster" because he had not controlled pollination. He went on to attend Cornell University where he received his bachelor's degree in agronomy and Iowa State University where he studied transposon biology with Peter A. Peterson and completed his PhD in 1986. After graduating from his PhD program, Schnable worked as a postdoctoral scholar at the Max Planck Institute for Plant Breeding Research in Cologne, Germany.

== Career ==
Schnable was hired as an assistant professor at Iowa State University in 1988, going on to serve as the associate director of the ISU Plant Sciences Institute and later being named the second permanent director of the Institute. His early work at Iowa State University focused on the genetics of cytoplasmic male sterility in maize, a phenomenon governed by interactions between nuclear and cytoplasmic genomics widely used to improve the efficiency of producing hybrid corn seed. In 1996 he cloned rf2, a nuclear gene which restored fertility in maize carrying a cytoplasm which was otherwise male sterile and was shown to encode a mitochondrial aldehyde dehydrogenase.

=== Maize genome ===
Schnable was the lead author of the publication of the first maize genome sequence assembly in 2009, at the time the largest and most repeat rich plant genome sequenced. Transposable elements and other repeated DNA make up about 85 percent of the genome, increasing the challenge of accurately assembling the genome. In parallel publication of the genome itself, Schnable and colleagues reported evidence of widespread presence absence variation in maize, with hundreds of genes present in the reference genotype used to sequence the maize genome, B73, missing from the genomes other widely grown maize varieties.

=== Crops and the environment ===
Schnable's more recent research includes studying how natural genetic variation shapes the way crops respond to their environment, using computer models to explore corn plant traits, such as the number and width of leaves. He has argued that today's crops were adapted to the climate of the last 10,000 years and will have to change as conditions grow hotter and rainfall more variable.

=== Entrepreneurship ===
Schnable founded Dryland Genetics in 2014, a company that breeds proso millet, a grain that needs less water than corn and continues to run the company as of 2025. He was also one of the founders of EnGeniousAg, an Iowa State spinout that developed sensors to measure nitrogen levels in corn plant stalks which was acquired in 2024.

== Recognition ==
- 2010: Elected a Fellow of the American Association for the Advancement of Science.
- 2025: Elected a Fellow of the National Academy of Inventors.
- 2026: Selected to receive the 2027 Barbara McClintock Prize for Plant Genetics and Genome Studies.
