= Rachel Pastan =

American novelist and educator

- Education: Harvard College; Iowa Writers' Workshop
- Occupations: Novelist; educator
- Spouse: David Cohen
- Children: 2
- Relatives: Linda Pastan (mother)
- Writing career
- Language: English
- Period: 2004–present
- Genres: Literary fiction; historical fiction
- Notable works: This Side of Married (2004); Lady of the Snakes (2008); Alena (2014); In the Field (2021)
- Notable awards: National Book Foundation Science + Literature Award (2022)
- Website: www.rachelpastan.com

Rachel Pastan (born c. 1966) is an American novelist and educator whose work combines themes of art, science, and women's creativity. Her novels include Alena (2014), set in the contemporary art world, and In the Field (2021), inspired by geneticist Barbara McClintock.

== Biography ==
Pastan was born c. 1966, the daughter of poet Linda Pastan, and grew up in suburban Maryland. By the age of six, she had decided to become a writer, inspired by watching her mother work at her IBM Selectric typewriter. She earned a Bachelor of Arts from Harvard College, where she published her first short story in The Georgia Review at age 19, and completed an Master of Fine Arts (MFA) at the Iowa Writers' Workshop at the University of Iowa in 1990.

Before publishing her first novel, Pastan wrote three unpublished novels and a short-story collection, receiving numerous rejections over more than a decade. Her short fiction appeared in magazines such as The Georgia Review, The Threepenny Review, and Mademoiselle, and earned awards including the Arts and Letters Fiction Prize, the PEN Syndicated Fiction Award, and fellowships from the Wisconsin Arts Board and Delaware Arts Council. She published her first book, This Side of Married, in 2004.

Pastan has taught fiction writing at the Bennington Writing Seminars, Swarthmore College, Temple University, and the MFA program at Drexel University. She also served as Editor-at-Large at the Institute of Contemporary Art, Philadelphia, where she curated the blog Miranda and edited the chapbook Seven Writers (2014).

In 2025, Pastan became the literary director of Celia Bookshop, an independent bookstore in Swarthmore, Pennsylvania, co-founded with Beth Murray. In interviews, she described the project as a way to help connect readers with books and to create a community space centered on literature.

Pastan lives in Swarthmore, Pennsylvania, with her husband, David Cohen, a professor of astronomy at Swarthmore College. They have two children.

== Awards and honors ==
- Arts and Letters Fiction Prize
- PEN Syndicated Fiction Award
- Wisconsin Arts Board Fellowship
- Delaware Arts Council Fellowship
- National Book Foundation Science + Literature Award (2022) for In the Field

== Books ==
- This Side of Married (Viking, 2004), a domestic comedy set in and around Philadelphia; critics noted its contemporary approach to family and marriage themes.
- Lady of the Snakes (Harcourt, 2008), about a scholar who balances motherhood and academic ambition while rethinking authorship and attribution; coverage emphasized its treatment of work-life questions.
- Alena (Riverhead Books, 2014), a contemporary reimagining of the 1938 English novel Rebecca by Daphne du Maurier. Set at a Cape Cod art museum and conceived as a "love letter to contemporary art," the novel explores artistic passion and the boundary between art and life through the story of a young curator working in the shadow of her vanished predecessor. The book was praised for its wit and atmosphere, and noted by reviewers and literary outlets upon its release. In 2015, Longreads featured a chapter from the novel with an introduction by A. N. Devers.
- In the Field (Delphinium Books, 2021), a novel inspired by geneticist Barbara McClintock, follows a pioneering woman scientist navigating the male-dominated world of twentieth-century genetics while confronting questions of discovery, recognition, and personal sacrifice. It was selected for the National Book Foundation’s inaugural Science + Literature program in 2022.
