= James Schnable =

American plant geneticist

James C. Schnable
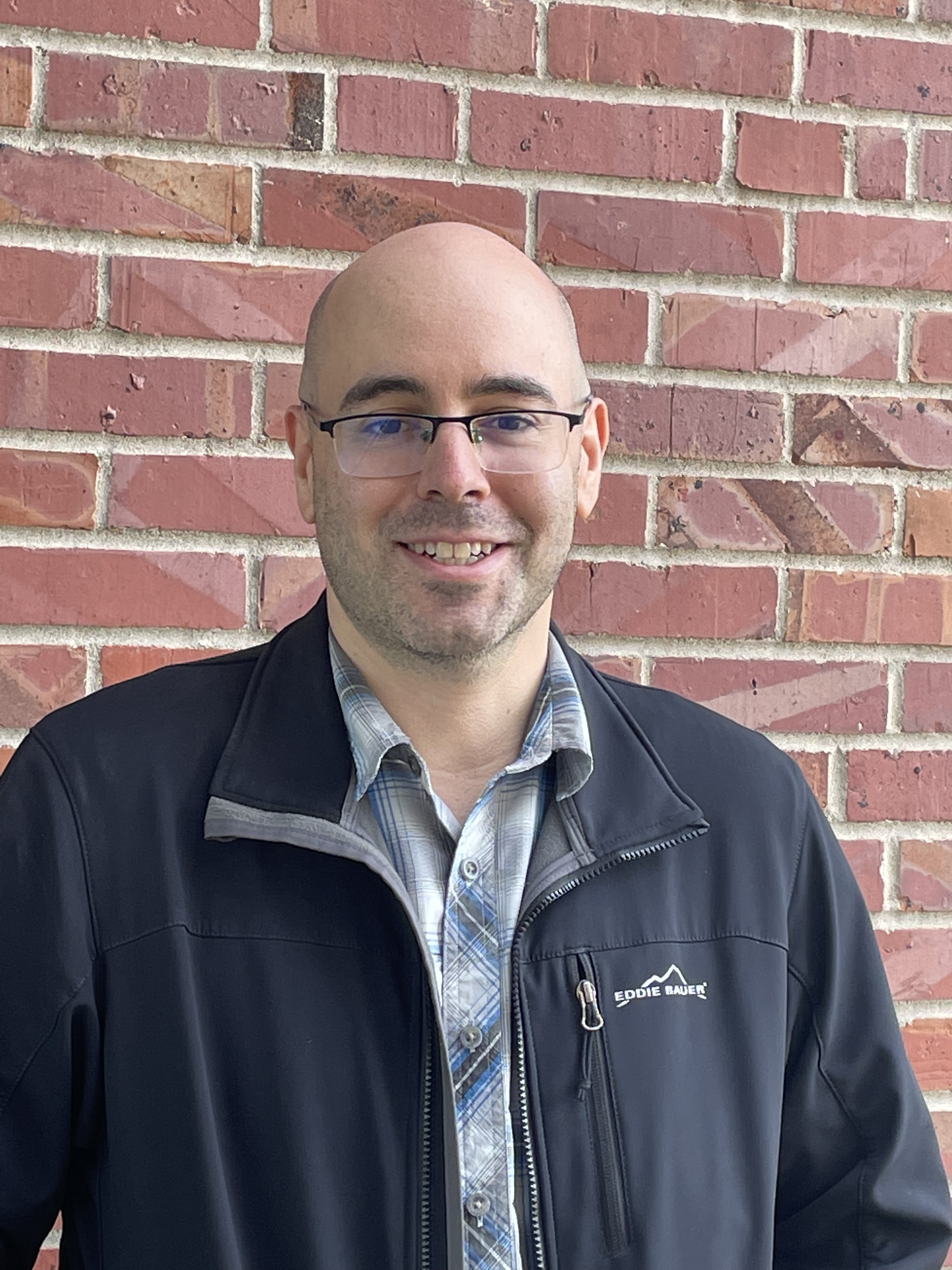
- Born: 1985 (age 40–41); Ames, Iowa
- Citizenship: United States
- Education: Cornell University, University of California, Berkeley
- Scientific career
- Fields: Plant Genetics
- Workplaces: University of Nebraska–Lincoln
- Thesis: Interactions among gene regulation and expression, sequence deletion, and purifying selection following whole genome duplications in flowering plants (2012)
- Doctoral advisor: Michael Freeling

James C. Schnable is a plant geneticist and the Nebraska Corn Checkoff Presidential Chair at the University of Nebraska–Lincoln, where his research program focuses on developing new technologies for crop genetics and breeding. He is the recipient of the 2026 National Academy of Sciences Prize in Food and Agriculture Sciences.

== Early life ==
Schnable was born in Des Moines, Iowa where is his father worked as a professor at Iowa State University studying the corn genome.

== Education and career ==
Schnable received his bachelor's degree from Cornell University in 2008. During his time as a college student he worked at Pioneer Hi-Bred. He joined the research group of Michael Freeling at the University of California, Berkeley, studying the evolution of plant genomes and how an ancient whole genome duplication altered the gene content and transcriptional regulation of the maize genome. After completing his PhD in 2012, he received an National Science Foundation Postdoctoral Fellowship to study at Donald Danforth Plant Science Center and the Chinese Academy of Agricultural Sciences.

In 2014, Schnable was hired as an assistant professor in the Department of Agronomy and Horticulture at the University of Nebraska – Lincoln. He was subsequently promoted to associate professor in 2019 and full professor in 2022. In 2022 Schnable was employed by X Development, a semi-secret research and development organization within Alphabet. In 2023 Schnable was appointed to the Nebraska Corn Checkoff Presidential Chair at the University of Nebraska-Lincoln.

As of 2023, Schnable had founded three startups, including one breeding new varieties of proso millet for farmers who no longer have enough water to grow corn and one commercializing sensors that measure the amount of nitrate in the stalks of plants.

== Research ==
A significant portion of Schnable's research is focused on forecasting how crops will perform in previously unencountered conditions, including the use of satellites and new sensors to track experiments with many different kinds of corn are growing at remote field locations and developing robots that can replace work plant genetics and breeders currently perform in the field. Schnable uses wearable plant sensors to track how fast different types of corn plants use water and develop ways for farmers to use water more efficiently.

Schnable has contributed to the sequencing of a number of plant genomes, including the genome of Proso millet, a relative of corn domesticated 10,000 years ago that grows in poor soil and requires far less water than other grain crops. In 2022, he led the effort to sequence and annotate the genome of Paspalum vaginatum, another relative of corn whose native range is salty and nutrient poor beaches and which was selected as the official turfgrass of the 2022 World Cup. Data from sequencing the paspalum genome lead to the discovery that increasing the concentration of trehalose in maize could active autophagy, a natural cellular recycling mechanism, and enable maize plants to grow faster under nitrogen limited conditions. Schnable was part of a team of scientists who generated the first complete telomere-to-telomere version of the maize genome.

A team Schnable led developed artificial intelligence models that can use DNA information to predict which genomes in the genomes of previously unstudied plant species will be activated in response to cold stress.

== Recognition ==
- In 2018 Schnable received the Maize Genetics Cooperation's Marcus Rhoades Early-Career Award for study of consequences of genome duplication in maize.
- In 2019 he was the recipient of the American Society of Plant Biologists' Early Career Award.
- In 2023 he was elected a Fellow of the German Cluster of Excellence Phenorob.
- In 2026 he received the National Academy of Sciences Prize in Food and Agricultural Sciences.
