= Detlef Weigel =

German-American biologist (born 1961)

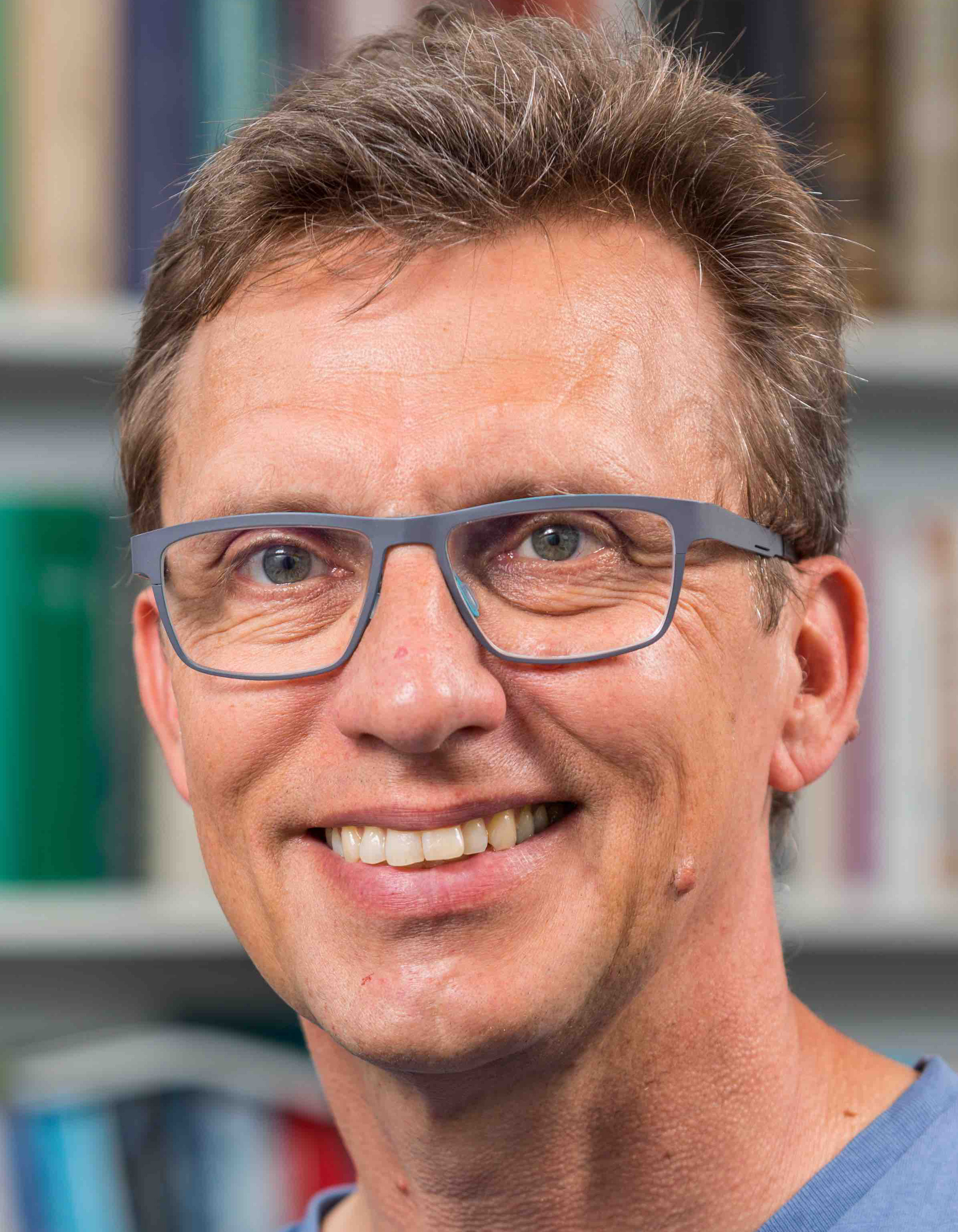
- Weigel in 2016
- Born: December 15, 1961 (age 64); Dannenberg (Elbe), Germany
- Education: Bielefeld University, University of Cologne
- Awards: McClintock Prize (2019); Gottfried Wilhelm Leibniz Prize (2007)
- Scientific career
- Fields: Biology
- Workplaces: Max Planck Institute for Developmental Biology; University of Tübingen; Salk Institute
- Doctoral advisor: Herbert Jäckle
- Website: weigelworld.org

Detlef Weigel (born 1961 in Lower Saxony, Germany) is a German American scientist working at the interface of developmental and evolutionary biology.

== Education ==
Weigel was an undergraduate in biology and chemistry at the universities of Bielefeld and Cologne. In 1986, he graduated with a Diploma in biology for this thesis on Drosophila neurogenesis with the late José Campos-Ortega. In 1988, he moved to the Max Planck Institute for Developmental Biology in Tübingen. During his PhD work with Herbert Jäckle, he discovered the founding member of an important class of transcription factors, the Forkhead/FOX proteins. In 1988, he graduated with a PhD (summa cum laude) from the University of Tübingen.

== Career and research ==
Weigel began to work with plants during his postdoctoral research with Elliot M. Meyerowitz at Caltech, where he cloned the floral regulator LEAFY from Arabidopsis thaliana. From 1993 to 2002, he was an Assistant and then associate professor at the Salk Institute for Biological Studies in La Jolla. In 2002, he accepted an appointment as Scientific Member and Director at the Max Planck Institute for Developmental Biology, where he founded the Department for Molecular Biology. He is also an adjunct professor at the Salk Institute and the University of Tübingen. In 2012, Weigel co-founded the plant bioinformatics startup company Computomics in Tübingen. He is Co-Editor-in-Chief of eLife.

During the 1990s, Weigel mostly studied the development of individual flowers and how the onset of flowering is regulated. His group made important discoveries in both areas. Together with Ove Nilsson, he demonstrated that transfer of the LEAFY gene from Arabidopsis thaliana to aspen trees was sufficient to reduce the time to flowering from years to months. Weigel and his team isolated the FT gene, which was later found to be an important component of the mobile signal inducing flowering. New genetic tools developed by his group led to the discovery of the first microRNA mutant in plants.

Through his study of factors that control the onset of flowering, a quintessential adaptive trait, Weigel became interested in more general questions of evolution. Apart from work on genetic variation in environment-dependent developmental processes, his group is known for the generation of extensive genomic resources, such as the first haplotype map for a non-mammalian species. To further exploit and advance the understanding of genetic variation, Weigel and colleagues initiated the 1001 Genomes project for Arabidopsis thaliana. Related to this is a new area of interest, in genetic barriers. In collaboration with Jeffery Dangl, his group discovered that such barriers in plants are often associated with autoimmunity. They could show that in certain hybrid offspring, specific gene products contributed by one of the parents may be inappropriately recognized as foreign and pathogenic, and thus trigger pervasive cell death throughout the plant. Most of the causal genes encode components of the immune system, indicating that there are constraints on the assembly of an optimal immune system. Several cases have been examined in detail and shown to be due to direct protein-protein interactions.

=== Honors and awards ===
- 1989 Dieter Rampacher Award of the Max Planck Society
- 1994 Young Investigator Award of the National Science Foundation
- 2001 Charles Albert Shull Award of the American Society of Plant Biologists
- 2003 Member of the European Molecular Biology Organization (EMBO)
- 2007 Gottfried Wilhelm Leibniz Prize of the Deutsche Forschungsgemeinschaft (DFG)
- 2008 Member of the German Academy of Sciences Leopoldina
- 2009 Member of the US National Academy of Sciences
- 2010 Otto Bayer Award of the Bayer Foundations
- 2010 Foreign Member of the Royal Society
- 2011 Fellow, American Association for the Advancement of Science
- 2011 State Research Prize of Baden-Württemberg
- 2015 Mendel Medal of the German National Academy of Sciences Leopoldina
- 2016 Genetics Society of America Medal
- 2019 McClintock Prize
- 2019 Member of American Academy of Arts and Sciences
- 2020 Novozymes Prize of the Novo Nordisk Foundation
