= Chris R. Somerville =

Canadian-American biologist

Christopher Roland Somerville is a Canadian-American biologist known as a pioneer of Arabidopsis thaliana research. Somerville is currently Professor Emeritus at the University of California, Berkeley and a Program Officer at the Open Philanthropy Project.

== Life and career ==
Somerville majored in Mathematics and completed a PhD in Genetics at the University of Alberta, and then did postdoctoral research in the laboratory of William Ogren before serving as a faculty member at U. Alberta, Michigan State University, Stanford University, and UC Berkeley. He directed the Department of Plant Biology at the Carnegie Institution for Science at Stanford University and then the Energy Biosciences Institute at the University of California, Berkeley. He retired from the UC Berkeley faculty in 2017.

Somerville was co-founder and Executive Chairman of Mendel Biotechnology, Inc. and a co-founder of Poetic Genetics, LS9, Inc, and Redleaf Biologics. Somerville has contributed to societal debates on the value of transgenic crops and biofuels.

Together with Elliot Meyerowitz, Somerville was awarded the Balzan Prize in 2006 for his work developing the small mustard plant A. thaliana as a model. His interest in this plant was partly stimulated by a review article written by George Rédei.

While at Michigan State University and funded by DOE, Somerville's research included developing transgenic plants which contained genes from two bacteria and enabled Arabidopsis to produce polyhydroxybutate (PHB), a biodegradable plastic. Companies already used PHB grown in bacteria, but it would be more cheaply produced from plants with the concept that potato would produce the plastic.

Many trainees from Somerville's lab have started independent labs, including Mark Estelle, Peter McCourt, George W. Haughn, John W. Schiefelbein, Christoph Benning, Clint Chapple, Wolf-Dieter Reiter, John Browse, Sean Cutler, Dominique Bergmann, Seung Y. Rhee, Staffan Persson, Wolfgang Lukowitz, C. Stewart Gillmor, Jose Martinez-Zapater, Hong Zhang, Ruth Finkelstein, Micha Volokita, Barbara Moffatt, Kathy Wu, Jose Botella, Bertrand Lemieux, Erwin Grill, John Shanklin, Yves Poirier, Christianne nawrath, Susan Gibson, Deane Falcone, Koh Iba, Simon Turner, Pierre Broun, Sean Cutler, Joe Ogas, Wolf Scheible, Dario Bonetta, John Sedbrook, Heather Youngs, Farhah Assaad, Michelle Facette, Alex Paredez, Jose Estevez, Seth DeBolt, Thorsten Hamman, Ying Gu, Ian Wallace, Philipp Benz, Charles Anderson, and Adrienne Roeder.

Somerville is a member of the U.S. National Academy of Sciences (1996), the Royal Society (1991), and the Royal Society of Canada (1993). Among the awards he has received are: the EPA Presidential Green Chemistry Award (2010); Balzan Prize (with Elliot Meyerowitz) (2006); Genetics Society, Mendel Medal (2004); Biochemical Society, Hopkins Medal (2004); ASPB Gibbs Medal (1993); Humbolt Research Award (1992); ASPB Schull Award (1987); NSF Young Presidential Investigator Award (1984). He was awarded honorary degrees by the University of York (2016); Michigan State University (2012); Guelph University (2006); Wageningen University (1998); University of Alberta (1997); Queens University (1993).

=== Media Appearances ===
Appeared in the Bill Nye the Science Guy episode entitled "Pollution Solutions". He presented his research on biodegradable plant-based plastics using the model plant Arabidopsis.

== Research highlights ==
- Pioneered ‘biochemical genetics’ approach to problems in plant metabolism, including photorespiration, lipid metabolism, and cellulose synthesis.
- First map-based cloning of an A. thaliana gene
- Lead development of The Arabidopsis Information Resource (TAIR) database and web resource

== Selected publications ==
=== Review articles ===
- Estelle, M. A.; Somerville, Chris R. (1986). "The mutants of Arabidopsis". Trends in Genetics. 2: 89–93. doi:10.1016/0168-9525(86)90190-3.
- Somerville, Chris; Koornneef, Maarten (2002). "A fortunate choice: the history of Arabidopsis as a model plant". Nature Reviews Genetics. 3 (11): 883–889. doi:10.1038/nrg927. PMID 12415318. S2CID 37515057.
- Somerville, Chris; Bauer, Stefan; Brininstool, Ginger; Facette, Michelle; Hamann, Thorsten; Milne, Jennifer; Osborne, Erin; Paredez, Alex; Persson, Staffan; Raab, Ted; Vorwerk, Sonja; Youngs, Heather (2004-12-24). "Toward a Systems Approach to Understanding Plant Cell Walls". Science. 306 (5705): 2206–2211. Bibcode:2004Sci...306.2206S. doi:10.1126/science.1102765. PMID 15618507. S2CID 1930301.
- Somerville, Chris (2007-02-20). "Biofuels". Current Biology. 17 (4): 115–119. doi:10.1016/j.cub.2007.01.010. PMID 17307040.
- Youngs, Heather; Somerville, Chris (2017-06-01). "Implementing industrial–academic partnerships to advance bioenergy research: the Energy Biosciences Institute". Current Opinion in Biotechnology. 45: 184–190. doi:10.1016/j.copbio.2017.03.027. PMID 28458111.

=== Interviews and historical pieces ===
- Somerville, Chris (2000-01-07). "The twentieth century trajectory of plant biology". Cell. 100 (1): 13–25. doi:10.1016/S0092-8674(00)81680-3. PMID 10647928. S2CID 22338154.
- Somerville, Chris R. (2001-01-01). "An early Arabidopsis demonstration. Resolving a few issues concerning photorespiration". Plant Physiology. 125 (1): 20–24. doi:10.1104/pp.125.1.20. PMC 1539316. PMID 11154287.
- Somerville, Chris (2004-10-26). "Q & A: Chris Somerville". Current Biology. 14 (20): 872–873. doi:10.1016/j.cub.2004.09.064. PMID 15498473.

== See also ==
- History of research on Arabidopsis thaliana
