= Shauna Somerville =

American scientist

- Born: Calgary, Alberta, Canada
- Education: BSc, MSc, 1978, University of Alberta; PhD, 1981, University of Illinois Urbana-Champaign
- Partner: Chris R. Somerville
- Scientific career
- Institutions: University of California, Berkeley; Michigan State University; University of Alberta
- Thesis: A Mutant of Arabidopsis Thaliana Deficient in Chloroplast Dicarboxylate Transport Activity (1981)

Shauna Christine Somerville (née Phimester) is a Canadian-American biological scientist. She is a professor of plant and microbial biology at the University of California, Berkeley. Somerville is known as a pioneer of Arabidopsis thaliana research alongside her husband Chris.

== Early life and education ==
Somerville was born to parents Alexander Laird and Edna Phimester in Calgary, Alberta, Canada. She attended Viscount Bennett High School. Following high school, Somerville enrolled at the University of Alberta for her Bachelor of Science and Master of Science degrees. While completing her master's degree, Somerville received a Canadian Wheat Board fellowship for the 1976-77 academic year. After graduating in 1978, Somerville and her husband Chris borrowed money and rented a flat in Paris. While there, the two began researching new tools in molecular genetics to enhance the productivity of crop plants. They chose to study a plant species called Arabidopsis thaliana after discovering George Rédei's research.

The Somervilles returned to the University of Alberta but received little encouragement to continue their study of Arabidopsis thaliana. Rédei sent the pair Arabidopsis seeds, which they used to dissect the main pathway of photorespiration. They then moved to the University of Illinois Urbana-Champaign and studied under Bill Ogren as PhD and postdoctoral students.

== Career ==
In 1986, Somerville became an assistant professor in the Department of Botany and Plant Pathology at Michigan State University (MSU). However, she was encouraged to work on diseases of cereals instead of Arabidopsis. Following her promotion to associate professor and the granting of tenure, Somerville returned to working with Arabidopsis. Due to her background in genetics, Somerville's research focused on the gene-for-gene hypothesis in plant pathology. The Somervilles left MSU in December 1993 to join the Plant Biology Department of the Carnegie Institution for Science at Stanford University.

While at Stanford, Somerville pioneered the use of "gene chips" for measuring the expression of all Arabidopsis genes in tissue samples. She also ran a program in molecular mechanisms by which some varieties of Arabidopsis exhibited fungal disease resistance. In 2007, Somerville was elected a Fellow of the American Association for the Advancement of Science. However, Chris' concerns about climate change led to them moving to the University of California, Berkeley in 2008.

Following their retirement, the pair moved to Hawaii and began growing cacao.

== See also ==
- History of research on Arabidopsis thaliana
