= MSU-DOE Plant Research Laboratory =

Research institute at Michigan State University

- PRL
- Motto: Plant science driving innovation
- Established: 1965
- Research type: Basic research on photosynthetic organisms; real-world applications
- Budget: $10 mil (research grants)
- Field of research: Plant science; Microbiology; Photosynthesis
- Director: Christoph Benning
- Staff: 150
- Location: East Lansing, Michigan, United States; 42°43′22″N 84°28′26″W
- Affiliations: Michigan State University; U.S. Department of Energy
- Website: www.prl.msu.edu

The MSU-DOE Plant Research Laboratory (PRL), commonly referred to as Plant Research Lab, is a research institute funded to a large extent by the U.S. Department of Energy Office of Science and located at Michigan State University (MSU) in East Lansing, Michigan. The Plant Research Lab was founded in 1965, and it currently includes twelve laboratories that conduct collaborative basic research into the biology of diverse photosynthetic organisms, including plants, bacteria, and algae, in addition to developing new technologies towards addressing energy and food challenges.

== History ==
=== 1964-1978 ===
The contract for the establishment of the MSU-DOE Plant Research Laboratory was signed on March 6, 1964, between the U.S. Atomic Energy Commission (AEC) and Michigan State University. The institute was initially funded by the AEC's Division of Biology and Medicine, which saw a need for improving the state of plant sciences in the United States. The Division aimed to create a new program at one or more universities where student interest in plant research could be fostered.

The contract signed between AEC and Michigan State University provided for a comprehensive research program in plant biology and related education and training at the graduate and postgraduate levels. The program was to draw strongly on related disciplines such as biochemistry, biophysics, genetics, microbiology, and others.

In 1966, personnel of the new program - called MSU-AEC Plant Research Laboratory at that time - moved into their new quarters in the Plant Biology Laboratories building at Michigan State University. The first research projects generally focused on problems specific to plants, such as cell growth and its regulation by plant hormones, cell wall structure and composition, and the physiology of flower formation; other research projects addressed general biological problems, such as the regulation of enzyme formation during development and cellular and genetic aspects of hormone action.

In the 1970s, federal funding of the Plant Research Lab changed hands a number of times. The AEC was abolished following the Energy Reorganization Act of 1974, and its functions were assigned to two new agencies. In 1975, the Plant Research Lab thus found itself supported by the newly formed Energy Research and Development Administration, which in turn, was consolidated into the U.S. Department of Energy (DOE) in 1978. The institute's name was modified in step with the changes at the federal level, finally settling on its current name, MSU-DOE Plant Research Laboratory.

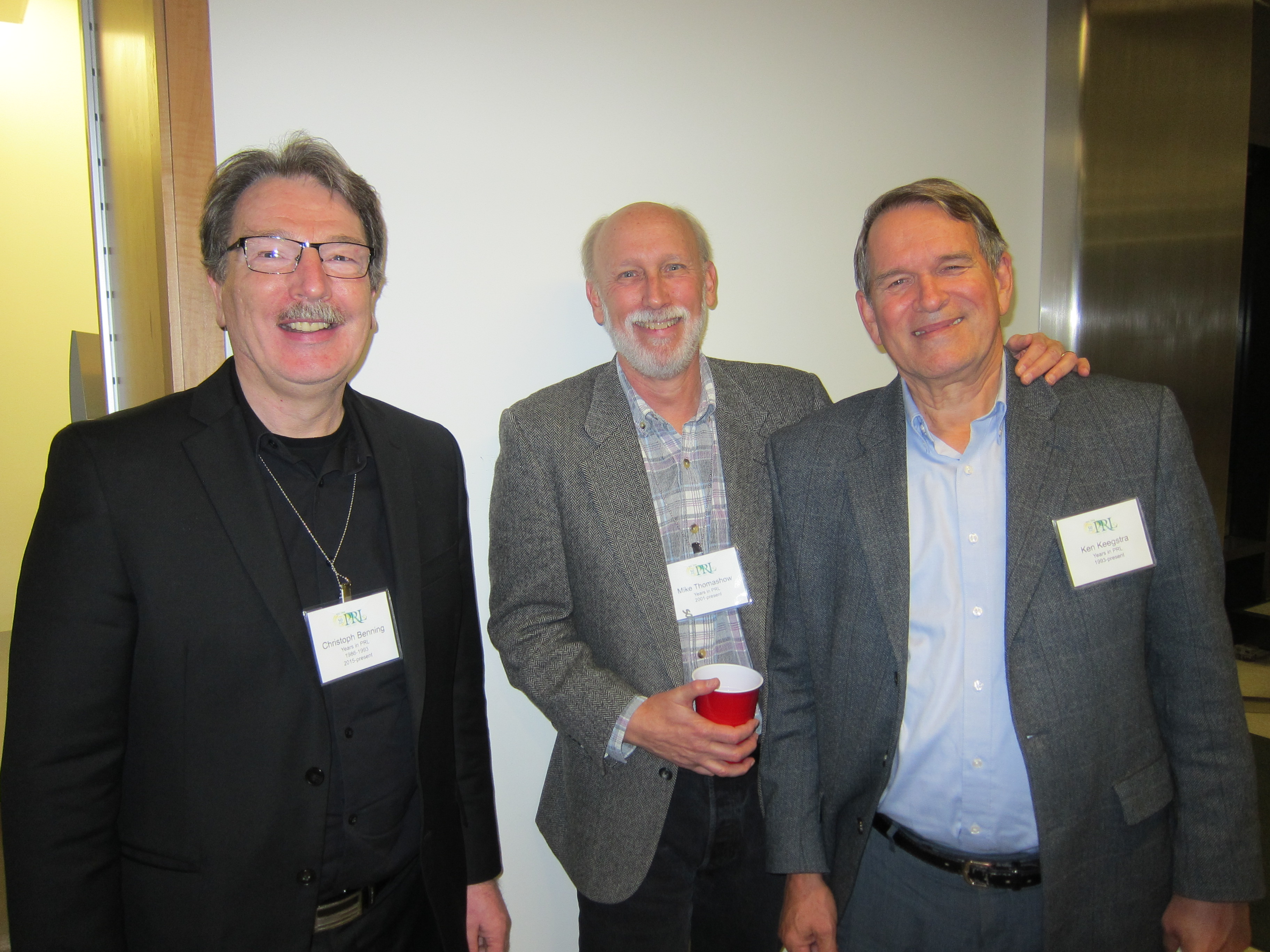
Christoph Benning, PRL director from 2015 to 2025, with two past directors, Michael Thomashow and Kenneth Keegstra, at the 50th PRL anniversary celebration in 2014.

=== 1978-2006 ===
The DOE broadened the laboratory's mandate to look at basic plant processes, especially regarding the growth of plants as a renewable resource, with the focus of research shifting to modern plant molecular biology. During that period, Plant Research Lab scientists were among the pioneers who introduced the use of the model plant, Arabidopsis thaliana, into plant biology.

Starting in the 1990s, the Plant Research Lab initiated a culture of group projects, which combined the talents of Plant Research Lab faculty members with scientists from other departments at Michigan State University, in order to tackle difficult and risky research projects. Projects included the biosynthesis of cell wall components, establishing a genetic system for the nitrogen-fixing actinomycete Frankia, studying the molecular basis of flower induction, studying membrane-tethered transcription factors, and others.

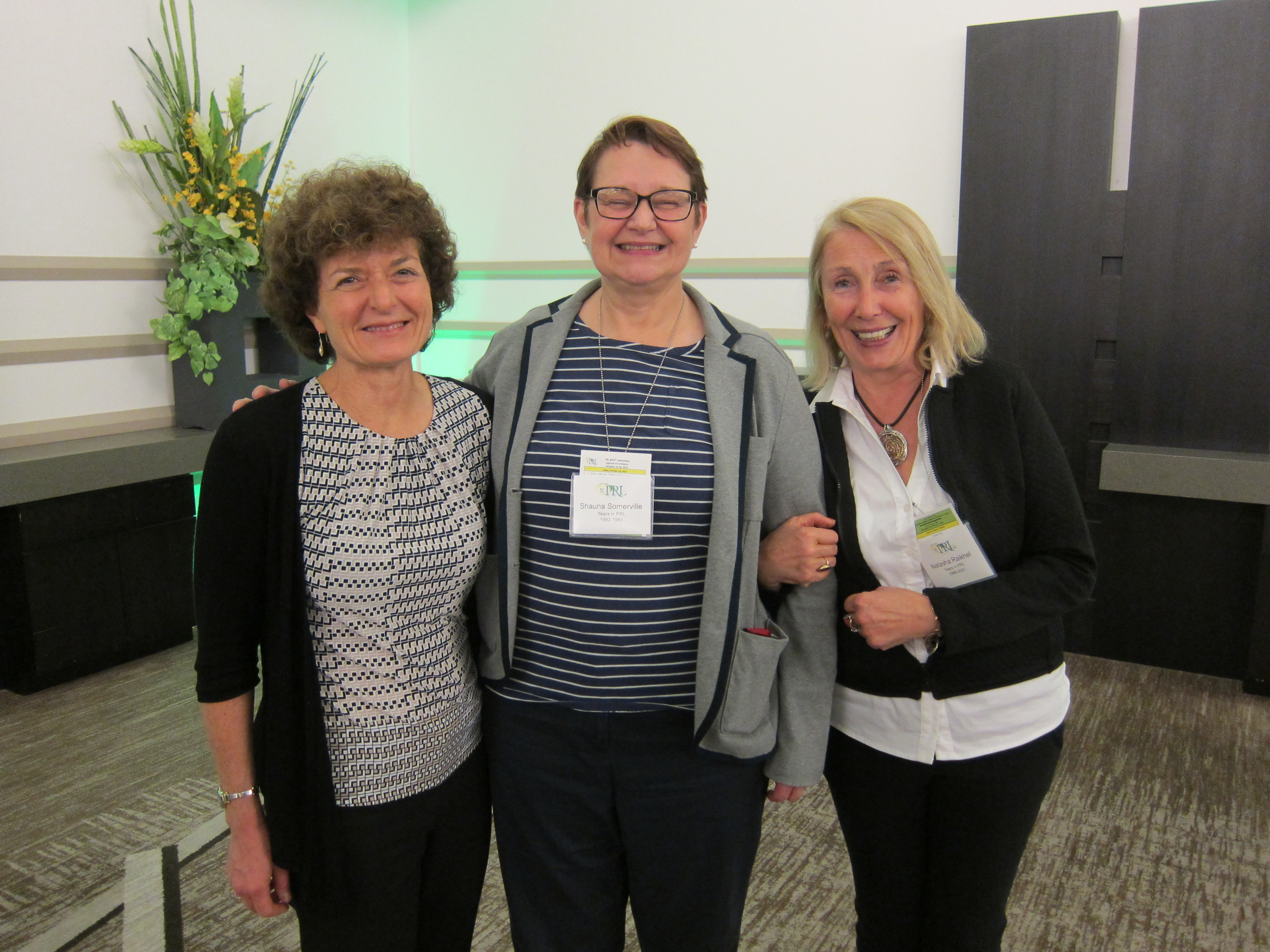
Pamela Green, Shauna Somerville, and Natasha Raikhel at the 50th PRL anniversary celebration in 2014.

=== 2006-present ===
In 2006, the Plant Research Lab's research mission was redirected to match the new priorities of the DOE's Office of Basic Energy Sciences (DOE-BES). The DOE program was undergoing reorganization, and the goals now focused on fundamental aspects of energy and carbon capture, conversion, and deposition in energy-rich molecules in both plants and microbes.

This change in research direction led to a reconfiguration of group research projects and to new faculty hires. In 2013, the group project model, first adopted in the 1990s, became the fundamental research model - "research teams addressing research themes" - for all DOE-BES funded research. Three primary research projects were initiated (go to section) to understand the basic science of photosynthetic organisms, including the exploration of photosynthetic processes across multiple scales of biological organization, ranging from subcellular (e.g. photoactive compounds, enzymes, protein complexes and bacterial microcompartments, the thylakoid membrane), to the overall integration of photosynthesis in cells and organisms in their environments. Another aim is to understand photosynthesis in 'real life,' how it is regulated by changes in the natural environment and in response to environmental challenges. The long-term goal uniting these research areas is to improve photosynthetic efficiency and to develop new industrial technological applications.

As of 2020, the Plant Research Lab had over 900 alumni worldwide, many of whom have assumed important academic, industrial, and governmental positions. Since its inception, 18 Plant Research Lab scientists have been elected members of the U.S. National Academy of Sciences, a prestigious honor for scientists in the United States; 21 have been elected American Association for the Advancement of Science Fellows; and 23 have been elected American Society of Plant Biologists Fellows.

== Research ==
=== Department of Energy Grant ===
DOE-funded collaborative projects drive the research conducted at the MSU-DOE Plant Research Laboratory. The projects involve all twelve labs at the Plant Research Lab and rely on their diverse areas of expertise to tackle key problems too large to study in individual labs. The research addresses some of today's most challenging scientific questions, with implications for renewables, food sustainability, and medical and industrial technologies.

- One research area examines how photosynthesis adapts to changing environmental conditions, focusing on the functions of genes and pathways involved in enhancing photosynthetic robustness in dynamic environments. The research tackles this problem by developing new scientific instruments that test plants and photosynthetic bacteria under a wide range of realistic conditions and identify undiscovered processes that tune photosynthetic activity rates; and by creating automated big data processing streams and bioinformatic pipelines.
- A second research area addresses how photosynthetic organisms sense and regulate the proportioning of energy and carbon between growth and other metabolic processes, such as protection against abiotic and biotic stresses, for example. The vision for this project is to holistically understand these photosynthetic and metabolic processes over a wide range of spatial and temporal scales and to develop models that describe how these processes interact.
- A third research area encompasses structural and functional studies of proteins that are used to construct subcellular microcompartments in cyanobacteria, with the long-term goal of repurposing these natural compartments to engineer improvements in photosynthesis, new renewable energy sources, and new compounds and molecular structures for medical or industrial uses.

=== Other Research and Developed Technologies ===
In addition to the collaborative projects funded by the DOE, individual laboratories conduct molecular research in diverse areas, including algal biofuels, plant resistance to biotic and abiotic threats, secretory membrane dynamics, dynamics of energy organelles (ie, mitochondria, peroxisomes, and chloroplasts), and molecular genetic and biochemical analyses of photomorphogenesis. The Plant Research Lab has also developed innovative technologies and methods to help address new research questions. Current examples include:

- Synthetic biology toolboxes to study and modify bacterial microcompartments or to develop synthetic microbial consortia or to engineer bacteria, algae, and plants as production systems for biofuels and other valuable medical or industrial compounds.
- Dynamic Environmental Photosynthetic Imaging growth chambers which capture a variety of environmental conditions seen in the field, such as light intensities or weather patterns, and replay them in a laboratory setting. The chambers are equipped with cameras that produce real-time heat maps of photosynthetic activity, down to the level of individual leaves.
- PhotosynQ, a platform that combines a hand-held device with cloud-based storage and analytical capabilities that allow users to measure plant health at a fundamental level in the field and to collect data anywhere in the world.
- Environmental Photobioreactors which enable scientists to study algae under the same conditions found in outdoor ponds, but in the much more controlled setting of the laboratory.

== Operations and governance ==
Michigan State University operates the MSU-DOE Plant Research Laboratory under a contract with the Department of Energy. The institute director reports to both to Michigan State University's College of Natural Sciences and the U.S. Department of Energy, Office of Science, Basic Energy Sciences program.

The Plant Research Lab is located on Michigan State University's East Lansing campus and has groups in both the Plant Biology Laboratory and Molecular Plant Sciences buildings. The institute consists of twelve research laboratories, each headed by a tenure-track faculty member, and has around 150 employees. Its twelve tenure-track faculty also hold appointments in academic departments and programs at Michigan State University.

The Plant Research Lab is solely a research institute and does not grant academic degrees to its students. Consequently, graduate students at the Plant Research Lab are appointed to both the institute and at least one of the affiliated academic departments or programs, the latter of which grant Ph.D. degrees. Postdoctoral associates are appointed to the Plant Research Lab with Michigan State University privileges, such as healthcare and funding.

== Laboratory directors ==
- Anton Lang (1965–1978)
- Hans Kende (1978–1980)
- Charles Arntzen (1980–1984)
- Hans Kende (1984–1988)
- Peter Wolk (1988–1992)
- Kenneth Keegstra (1993–2006)
- Michael Thomashow (2006–2015)
- Christoph Benning (2015–2025)
- Federica Brandizzi (2025–Present)
