= History of research on Arabidopsis thaliana =

Arabidopsis thaliana is a first class model organism and the single most important species for fundamental research in plant molecular genetics.

A. thaliana was the first plant for which a high-quality reference genome sequence was determined and a worldwide research community has developed many other genetic resources and tools. The experimental advantages of A. thaliana have enabled many important discoveries. These advantages have been extensively reviewed, as has its role in fundamental discoveries about the plant immune system, natural variation, root biology, and other areas.

== Early history ==
A. thaliana was first described by Johannes Thal, and later renamed in his honor. (See the Taxonomy section of the main article.) Friedrich Laibach outlined why A. thaliana might be a good experimental system in 1943 and collected a large number of natural accessions. A. thaliana is largely self-pollinating, so these accessions represent inbred strains, with high homozygosity that simplifies genetic analysis. Natural A. thaliana accessions are often referred to as "ecotypes". Laibach had earlier (1907) determined the A. thaliana chromosome number (5) as part of his PhD research. Laibach's student Erna Reinholz described mutagenesis of A. thaliana with X-ray radiation in 1945.

George Rédei pioneered the use of A. thaliana for fundamental studies, mutagenizing plants with ethyl methanesulfonate (EMS) and then screening them for auxotrophic defects and writing an influential review in 1975. Rédei distributed the standard laboratory accessions 'Columbia-0' and 'Landsberg erecta'.

Gerhard Röbbelen organized the first International Arabidopsis Symposium in 1965. Röbbelen also started the 'Arabidopsis Information Service', a newsletter for sharing information in the community. This newsletter was maintained by A.R. Kranz starting in 1974, and was published until 1990.

== Growing interest, 1975-1986 ==
As molecular biology methods progressed, many investigators sought to focus community effort on a common model plant species such as petunia or tomato. This concept changed the emphasis of the long tradition of researchers using diverse agronomically important species such as maize, barley, and peas. The A. thaliana subcommunity espoused an ethos of freely sharing information and materials, and investigators were attracted by the perceived wide-open nature of plant molecular genetics relative to other fields that were better established and thus more "crowded" and competitive. The A. thaliana genome was shown to be relatively small and nonrepetitive, which was an important advantage for early molecular methods. Pioneering A. thaliana studies have used its natural filamentous pathogen Hyaloperonospora arabidopsidis, the model plant-pathogenic bacterium Pseudomonas syringae, and many other microbes. A. thaliana roots are transparent and have a relatively simple radially symmetric cellular structure, facilitating analysis by microscopy.

== Molecular cloning, 1986-2000 ==
Cloning of an A. thaliana gene, an alcohol dehydrogenase-encoding locus, was described in 1986, by which time mutations at over 200 loci had been defined.

=== Genetic linkage maps, QTL populations, and map-based cloning ===
Development of genetic maps based on scorable phenotypes and molecular genetic markers facilitated map-based cloning of mutant loci from classical "forward genetic" screens. Growing amounts of DNA sequence data facilitated development and application of such molecular markers. Descriptions of the first successful map-based cloning projects were published in 1992.

Recombinant inbred strain/line (RIL) populations were developed, notably from a cross of Columbia-0 × Lansberg erecta, and used to map and clone a wide variety of quantitative trait loci.

=== Efficient genetic transformation ===
A. thaliana can be genetically transformed using Agrobacterium tumefaciens; transformation was first reported in 1986. Later work showed that transgenic seed can be obtained by simply dipping flowers into a suitable bacterial suspension. The invention/discovery of this 'floral dip' method, published in 1998, made A. thaliana arguably the most easily transformed multicellular organism, and has been essential to many subsequent investigations. Efficient transformation facilitated insertional mutagenesis as described further below.

=== Transcription factors and regulation ===
==== Floral homeotic genes and the ABC model ====
A. thaliana geneticists made important contributions to development of the ABC model of flower development via genetic analysis of floral homeotic mutants.

==== Homeodomain genes ====
The plant homeodomain finger is so named due to its discovery in an Arabidopsis homeodomain. In 1993 Schindler et al. discovered the PHD finger in the protein HAT3.1. It has since proven to be important to chromatin in a wide variety of taxa.

KNOTTED-like homeobox genes, homologs of the maize KNOTTED1 gene that control shoot apical meristem identity, were described in 1994 and cloning of the SHOOT-MERISTEMLESS locus was published in 1996.

=== Genome project ===
An international consortium began developing a physical map for A. thaliana in 1990, and DNA sequencing and assembly efforts were formalized in the Arabidopsis Genome Initiative (AGI) in 1996. This work paralleled the Human Genome Project and related projects for other model organisms, including the budding yeast S. cerevisiae, the nematode C. elegans, and the fly Drosophila melanogaster, which were published in 1996, 1998, and 2000, respectively. The project built on efforts to sequence expressed sequence tags from A. thaliana. Descriptions of the sequences of chromosomes 4 and 2 were published in 1999, and the project was completed in 2000. This represented the first reference genome for a flowering plant and facilitated comparative genomics.

== Functional and comparative genomics, 2000-2010 and beyond ==
=== NSF 2010 project ===
A series of meetings led to an ambitious long-term NSF-funded initiative to determine the function of every A. thaliana gene by the year 2010. The rationale for this project was to combine new high-throughput technologies with systematic gene-family-wide studies and community resources to accelerate progress beyond what was possible via piecemeal single-laboratory studies.

=== Microarray and transcriptome analysis ===
DNA microarray technology was rapidly adopted for A. thaliana research and led to the development of "atlases" of gene expression in different tissues and under different conditions.

=== Large-scale "reverse genetic" analysis ===
The A. thaliana genome sequence, low-cost Sanger sequencing, and ease of transformation facilitated genome-wide mutagenesis, yielding collections of sequence-indexed transposon mutant and (especially) T-DNA mutant lines. The ease and speed of ordering mutant seed from stock centers dramatically accelerated "reverse genetic" study of many gene families; the Arabidopsis Biological Resource Center and the Nottingham Arabidopsis Stock Centre were important in this regard, and information on stock availability was integrated into The Arabidopsis Information Resource database.

Syngenta developed and publicly shared a significant T-DNA mutant population, the Syngenta Arabidopsis Insertion Library (SAIL) collection. Industry investment in A. thaliana research suffered a setback in the closure of Syngenta's Torrey Mesa Research Institute (TMRI), but remained robust. Mendel Biotechnology overexpressed the vast majority of A. thaliana transcription factors to generate leads for genetic engineering. Cereon Genomics, a subsidiary of Monsanto, sequenced the Landsberg erecta accession (at lower coverage than the Col-0 project) and shared the assembly, along with other sequence marker data.

=== RNA silencing ===
A. thaliana quickly became an important model for the study of plant small RNAs. The argonaute1 mutant, named for its resemblance to an Argonauta octopuses, was the namesake for the Argonaute protein family central to silencing. Forward genetic screens focused on vegetative phase change uncovered many genes controlling small RNA biogenesis. Multiple groups identified mutations in the DICER-LIKE1 gene (encoding the main DICER protein controlling microRNA biogenesis in plants) that cause strong developmental defects. A. thaliana became an important model for RNA-directed DNA methylation (transcriptional silencing), partly because many A. thaliana methylation mutants are viable, which is not the case for several model animals (in which such mutations cause lethality).

=== Growing popularity of other model plants ===
As the NSF 2010 project neared completion, there was a perceived decrease in funding agency interest in A. thaliana, evidenced by the cessation of USDA funding for A. thaliana research and the end of NSF funding for the TAIR database. This trend coincided with the progress of the (US NSF-supported) National Plant Genome Initiative, which began in 1998 and put an increased emphasis on crops. Draft genome sequence for rice were published in 2002 and followed by publications for sorghum and maize in 2009. A draft genome of the model tree Populus trichocarpa was published in 2006. The draft genome of Brachypodium distachyon, a short-statured model grass (Poaceae) was published in 2010. The Joint Genome Institute of the United States Department of Energy identified poplar, sorghum, B. distachyon, model C4 grass Setaria viridis (foxtail millet), model moss Physcomitrella patens, model alga Chlamydomonas reinhardtii, and soybean as its "flagship" species for plant genomics geared towards bioenergy applications.

=== Awards ===
Well established investigators including Ronald W. Davis, Gerald Fink, and Frederick M. Ausubel adopted A. thaliana as a model in the 1980s, attracting interest.

Elliot Meyerowitz and Chris R. Somerville were awarded the Balzan Prize in 2006 for their work developing A. thaliana as a model. Thirteen prominent American A. thaliana geneticists were selected as investigators of the prestigious Howard Hughes Medical Institute and Gordon and Betty Moore Foundation in 2011: Philip Benfey, Dominique Bergmann, Simon Chan, Xuemei Chen, Jeff Dangl, Xinnian Dong, Joseph R. Ecker, Mark Estelle, Sheng Yang He, Robert A. Martienssen, Elliot Meyerowitz, Craig Pikaard, and Keiko Torii. (Also selected were wheat geneticist Jorge Dubcovsky and photosynthesis researcher Krishna Niyogi, who has extensively used A. thaliana along with the alga Chlamydomonas reinhardtii.) Prior to this, a handful of A. thaliana geneticists had become HHMI investigators: Joanne Chory (1997, also awarded a 2018 Breakthrough Prize in Life Sciences), Daphne Preuss (2000-2006), and Steve Jacobsen (2005). Caroline Dean was awarded many honors including the 2020 Wolf Prize in Agriculture for "pioneering discoveries in flowering time control and epigenetic basis of vernalization" made with A. thaliana.

=== Impact of second- and third-generation sequencing technology ===
A. thaliana continues to be the subject of intense study using new technologies such as high-throughput sequencing. Direct sequencing of cDNA ("RNA-Seq") largely replaced microarray analysis of gene expression, and several studies sequenced cDNA from single cells (scRNA-seq), particularly from root tissue. Mapping of mutations from forward screens is increasingly done with direct genome sequencing, combined in some cases with bulked segregant analysis or backcrossing. A. thaliana is a premier model for studies of the plant microbiome and natural genetic variation, including genome-wide association studies. Short RNA-guided DNA editing with CRISPR tools has been applied to A. thaliana since 2013.
