= Mark Andrew Estelle =

Canadian-American biologist

Mark Andrew Estelle is a Canadian-American biologist known for his work elucidating the mechanism of the plant hormone, auxin using the model plant Arabidopsis thaliana. He is currently a Distinguished Professor at University of California San Diego.

== Life and career ==
=== Early life ===
Mark Andrew Estelle was born in Calgary Alberta, Canada in 1955. His undergraduate and graduate education emphasized genetic approaches to problems, regardless of species or organism which helped him develop a broad view of approaching scientific investigation.

=== Education ===
Estelle earned his BS. degree at University of Alberta B.S. in 1978. He earned his Ph.D. in genetics from the University of Alberta in 1983. His doctoral research involved the fruit fly and was entitled "The analysis of a dopa decarboxylase activity variant in Drosophila melanogaster".

Estelle continued his scientific training as a research associate of the Michigan State University-U.S. Department of Energy Plant Research Laboratory with Dr. Chris R. Somerville (1983–86).

In 1986, he was hired as an assistant professor at Indiana University and eventually became the Indiana University Miller Chair in Plant Developmental Biology 2002–2008. He later moved his research lab to the University of California San Diego as a Distinguished Professor, Department of Cellular and Developmental Biology 2008–present.

== Research areas ==
Estelle's laboratory utilizes the plant Arabidopsis thaliana to identify auxin response pathways. His group determined that auxin response depends on the degradation of transcriptional repressors called the Aux/IAA proteins with requires the ubiquitin protein ligase E3 called SCFTIR1.

== Recognition ==
- HHMI investigator 2011-2018
- American Association for Advancement of Science 2003
- National Academy of Science 2007
- Anton Lang Memorial Lecture MSU-DOE Plant Research Laboratory 2007
- Woolhouse Lecture John Innes Center Norwich UK 2011
- Pioneer Member of American Society of Plant Biologists 2023
- Recipient of the Martin Gibbs Medal from the American Society of Plant Biologists (2025)
- Recipient the Philip N. Benfey Arabidopsis Community Lifetime Achievement Award for his foundational work in the auxin field

== See also ==
- History of research on Arabidopsis thaliana
- Interview on NPR
