= Ritankar Das =

American technology entrepreneur and scientist

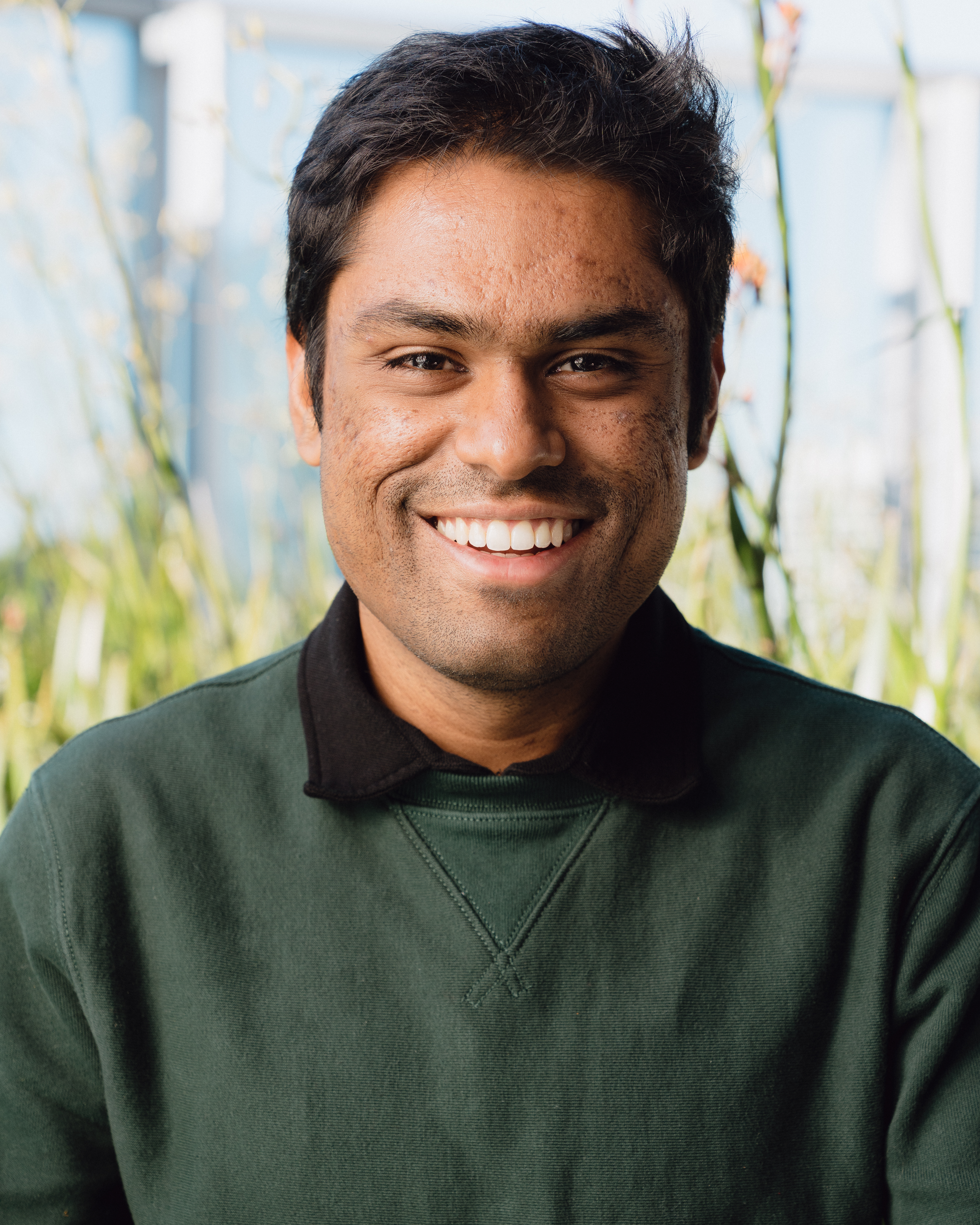
- Born: November 27, 1994 (age 31)
- Education: University of California Berkeley, University of Oxford
- Scientific career
- Fields: Physical Sciences, Life Sciences, Engineering

Ritankar Das is an American American scientist, billionaire, and technology entrepreneur. He is the founder of Titan Holdings, which builds and operates artificial intelligence companies, and is the co-founder and chief executive of Prentis, an AI research lab focused on computer-use models. At 18, he was the youngest University Medalist (top graduating senior) in at least a century among over 6000 graduates from UC Berkeley. He has been featured in the San Francisco Chronicle, ABC News, Times of India and over 100 other media outlets around the globe.

== Early life and education ==
Das was born in Kolkata, India and moved to Milwaukee, Wisconsin at the age of seven. He graduated from Mission San Jose High School in Fremont, CA before attending the University of California, Berkeley. In three years at the age of 18, he completed his studies at UC Berkeley with a double major in bioengineering and chemical biology and a minor in creative writing. He became UC Berkeley's youngest University Medalist in at least 100 years, and also became the first Medalist ever from the Department of Bioengineering and first from the College of Chemistry in the last 58 years. He then received a master’s degree in biomedical engineering at Oxford University. After that, he commenced doctoral studies in machine learning at the University of Cambridge through the Gates Cambridge Scholarship before dropping out in 2017.

== Career ==
=== Dascena ===
In 2017, Das founded Dascena, a healthcare-focused machine learning AI startup. Dascena’s machine learning research was funded by the National Science Foundation and the National Institutes of Health.

In 2019, Dascena partnered with Danaher Corporation and the Biomedical Advanced Research and Development Authority to develop an algorithm for early sepsis detection. In 2020, Dascena announced a $50 million funding round. The Food and Drug Administration issued an Emergency Use Authorization to Dascena for its algorithm used to inform COVID-19 care.

In 2021, the Food and Drug Administration issued a Breakthrough Device Designation to Dascena for its algorithm used to predict GI bleed risk. In 2022, Dascena developed an algorithm for identifying patients with pulmonary hypertension in collaboration with Johnson and Johnson. Dascena was acquired by CirrusDx in 2022.

=== Forta Health ===
In 2021, Das founded Forta Health, an AI healthcare company that provides personalized care to children with autism. Forta Health provides therapy for children with autism and their families, using its clinical algorithms paired with parent-led ABA therapy.

In 2024, Forta Health announced a $55 million Series A funding round led by Insight Partners.

=== Tala Health ===
In 2024, Das founded Tala Health, an AI integrated healthcare technology company, through Titan Holdings. Tala Health builds clinical AI agents to support licensed professionals.

In 2025, Tala Health announced a $100 million funding round led by Sofreh Capital.

=== Prentis AI ===
In 2026, Das co-founded Prentis, an AI research lab developing "computer-use" models intended to let AI agents operate office software and automate routine workflows, together with LinkedIn co-founder Reid Hoffman and Zynga founder Mark Pincus. Das serves as Prentis's chief executive officer.

== Other Activities ==
=== Research ===
Das began researching alternative energy sources at the age of 12 and continued this work at the Energy Biosciences Institute and the United States Department of Energy. His research work included development of better solvents to break down cellulose for biofuels and finding new ways to grow nanowires for using in highly efficient solar cells. He then conducted research on organic light-emitting diodes at Taiwan's Academia Sinica. After that, Das performed artificial intelligence and computer vision research at the Oxford Institute of Biomedical Engineering and at Cambridge University.

Das also analyzed entries for the Presidential Green Chemistry Awards at the United States Environmental Protection Agency. He was recognized by the Smithsonian as a "Future Nobel Laureate", was named a graduate fellow of the National Science Foundation and is featured in an upcoming National Geographic documentary.

=== See Your Future ===
Das was the founder and CEO of See Your Future, an education NGO that reached 75 million people worldwide. The goal of See Your Future was to increase the access of underrepresented students, such as low income, minority groups and female students, to Science, Technology, Engineering and Mathematics (STEM) careers with the help of curiosity-based learning and new technology platforms. See Your Future was merged with Community Resources for Science in 2016.
