= Stuart M. Lindsay =

British-American physicist and biophysicist

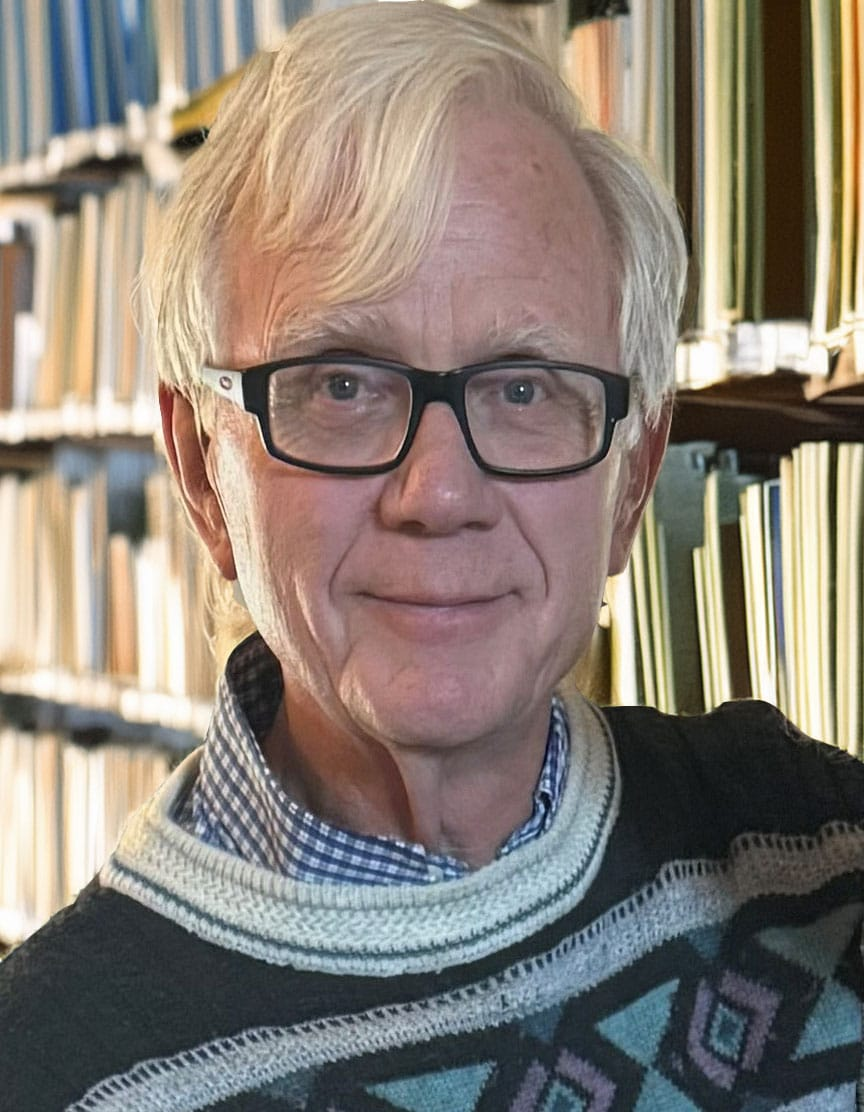
- Stuart M. Lindsay
- Education: University of Manchester
- Known for: Scanning probr microscopy
- Awards: Fellow of the American Physical Society (1990); Fellow of the American Association for the Advancement of Science (2003); Fellow of the Institute of Physics (UK) (2011); Fellow of the National Academy of Inventors (2014)
- Scientific career
- Fields: Physics, chemistry, biophysics, nanoscience
- Workplaces: Arizona State University

Stuart M. Lindsay (born 3 July 1951) is a British-American physicist, chemist and biophysicist. He is a Regents' Professor and University Professor of Physics and Chemistry at Arizona State University (ASU), where he directs the Biodesign Institute's Center for Single Molecule Biophysics.

He is known for his development of scanning probe microscopy (particularly atomic force microscopy). He co-founded Molecular Imaging Corporation (acquired by Agilent Technologies in 2005, later part of Keysight Technologies), which commercialised advanced liquid-environment scanning probe instruments, and more recently Recognition Analytix.

== Early life and education ==
Lindsay was born in London, England, and earned his PhD in physics from the University of Manchester in 1976. He then worked briefly in solid-state physics research for Philips Industries in London before moving to the United States.

== Career ==
Lindsay joined the faculty of Arizona State University in 1979 and founded its biophysics program. He has held the Edward and Nadine Carson Presidential Chair in Physics and served as director of the Center for Single Molecule Biophysics since its establishment in 2002.

In 1993 he co-founded Molecular Imaging Corporation with engineer Tianwei Jing to commercialise liquid-environment atomic force microscopes; the company was acquired by Agilent Technologies in November 2005 and later became part of Keysight Technologies. He has held consulting roles with Agilent/Keysight and co-founded Recognition Analytix.

== Research ==
Lindsay developed the use of scanning tunneling and atomic force microscopy on biomolecules in aqueous environments. This work enabled high-resolution imaging of DNA and nucleoprotein complexes under physiological conditions. Early work includes STM/AFM imaging of nucleosome DNA in water (1989).

His group advanced single-molecule electron transport measurements. These include reproducible conductance studies of alkanedithiols and organic molecules.

He developed recognition-tunneling methods for identifying individual DNA bases and amino acids at the single-molecule level. He also contributed to nanopore sequencing technologies as co-author of a 2008 Nature Biotechnology review.

Lindsay's group has explored long-range electron transport in proteins (protein wires). This includes conductance switching and the role of aromatic residues in mediating conductivity.

He holds 56 U.S. patents in scanning probe instrumentation and molecular electronics and has published over 200 peer-reviewed papers.

== Impact ==
The instruments developed by Molecular Imaging (now Keysight) have become standard tools in nanotechnology and life-sciences research. The company is cited as a significant economic outcome of federally funded university research. His textbook is used for interdisciplinary nanoscience education. A special issue of the Journal of Physics: Condensed Matter (2012) was dedicated to his work.

== Awards and honors ==
- Humboldt Senior Scientist Award (1993)
- Fellow, American Physical Society (1990; for pioneering STM imaging of biomolecules in water)
- Fellow, American Association for the Advancement of Science (2003)
- Regents' Professor, Arizona State University (2008)
- Fellow, Institute of Physics (UK) (2011)
- Fellow, National Academy of Inventors (2014; inducted 2015)
- University Professor, Arizona State University (2014)

== Selected publications ==
- Lindsay, S. M. (2009). Introduction to Nanoscience. Oxford University Press. ISBN 978-0-19-954421-9. (Described as the first comprehensive interdisciplinary textbook on the subject.)
- Branton, D.; Deamer, D. W.; Marziali, A.; ... Lindsay, S. M. ... (2008). "The potential and challenges of nanopore sequencing". Nature Biotechnology. 26 (10): 1146–1153. doi:10.1038/nbt.1495.
- Li, X.; He, J.; Hihath, J.; Xu, B.; Lindsay, S. M.; Tao, N. J. (2006). "Conductance of single alkanedithiols...". Journal of the American Chemical Society. 128 (6): 2135–2141. doi:10.1021/ja057316x (662+ citations).
- Lindsay, S. et al. (1989). "STM and AFM images of nucleosome DNA under water". Journal of Biomolecular Structure & Dynamics. 7 (2): 279–287. doi:10.1080/07391102.1989.10507771 (early pioneering work).
- Krishnan, S.; Lindsay, S. et al. (2023). "Long-Range Conductivity in Proteins Mediated by Aromatic Residues". ACS Physical Chemistry Au. 3 (5): 362–370. doi:10.1021/acsphyschemau.3c00017.
