= Rédei =

Rédei is a Hungarian surname. Notable people with the surname include:

- George Rédei (1921–2008), Hungarian plant biologist
- László Rédei, Hungarian mathematician
- Viktória Rédei Soós (born 1985), Hungarian handballer
