= Elliot Meyerowitz =

American biologist

- Born: May 22, 1951 (age 75)
- Education: Columbia University (A.B., 1973); Yale University (Ph.D., 1977)
- Awards: Genetics Society of America Medal (1996); Mendel Medal (1997); International Prize for Biology (1997); Richard Lounsbery Award (1999); Wilbur Cross Medal (2001); Harrison Prize (2005); Balzan Prize (2006); Wolf Prize in Agriculture (2024)
- Scientific career
- Fields: Biology
- Workplaces: California Institute of Technology
- Notable students: Xuemei Chen, Henrik Jönsson, Detlef Weigel

Elliot Meyerowitz (born May 22, 1951) is an American biologist.

== Career ==
Meyerowitz did his undergraduate work at Columbia University (A.B. in biology, 1973), where he worked part-time in the laboratory of Cyrus Levinthal on combined microscopic and computational methods for tracing axons and dendritic trees in the nervous systems of fish. His graduate work was in the Department of Biology at Yale University (Ph.D. 1977), where he worked in the laboratory of Douglas Kankel on the interaction of eye and brain development in Drosophila, by use of genetic mosaics. From 1977 to 1979 he was a postdoctoral fellow in the laboratory of David Hogness in the Biochemistry Department at the Stanford University School of Medicine, developing and using methods for the molecular cloning of genes in the early days of gene cloning and genomics. Since 1980 he has been a faculty member in the Division of Biology at the California Institute of Technology, where he served as division chair from 2000 to 2010, and where he is now George W. Beadle Professor of Biology. Between 2011 and 2013, he was appointed as inaugural director of the Sainsbury Laboratory at the University of Cambridge and elected into a professorship in the university, and a professorial fellow at Trinity College, while on leave from the California Institute of Technology.

Meyerowitz was a Drosophila melanogaster expert before he became a pioneer of Arabidopsis thaliana research. Meyerowitz is well known for his contributions on the genetic and molecular basis of plant hormone reception, and on the molecular mechanisms of pattern formation during flower and shoot apical meristem development. More recently, he has turned his attention to physical models of shoot morphogenesis. Many leaders in plant biology trained in his laboratory, including Xuemei Chen, Steven E. Jacobsen, Martin F. Yanofsky, John L. Bowman, and Detlef Weigel.

Meyerowitz is a member of the American Academy of Arts and Sciences (1991), the U.S. National Academy of Sciences (1995), and the American Philosophical Society (1998), and is a foreign member of the French Académie des Sciences (2002) and the Royal Society (2004).

Among the awards he has received are the Genetics Society of America Medal in 1996, the International Prize for Biology from the Japan Society for the Promotion of Science in 1997, the Richard Lounsbery Award from the U.S. National Academy of Sciences in 1999, the Wilbur Cross Medal of Yale University in 2001, the Harrison Prize of the International Society of Developmental Biologists in 2005 and the Balzan Prize for "Plant Molecular Genetics" in 2006 (with Chris R. Somerville). In 2024 he was awarded the Wolf Prize in Agriculture.

He is a member of the editorial board of eight leading journals in genetics, genomics, and developmental biology, and has served as president of the International Society for Plant Molecular Biology (1995–1997), the Genetics Society of America (1999) and the Society for Developmental Biology (2005–2006). He serves on the external advisory board for the Center for Research on Programmable Plant Systems (CROPPS), a National Science Foundation-funded Science and Technology Center led by Cornell University.

== Related pages ==
- ABC model of flower development
- History of research on Arabidopsis thaliana
