= Gregg Howe =

American plant biologist

- Born: Old Saybrook, Connecticut, USA
- Spouse: Darcy (m. 1997)

Academic background
- Education: BSc, MSc, biology, East Carolina University; PhD, biology, University of California, Los Angeles
- Thesis: An in vivo assay for 2 [mu] plasmid recombination (1987)

Gregg Alan Howe is an American plant biologist. He is a University Distinguished Professor and MSU Foundation Professor at Michigan State University. He is also a member of both the MSU-DOE Plant Research Laboratory and the Plant Resilience Institute. Howe is a Fellow of the American Association for the Advancement of Science, American Society of Plant Biologists, and National Academy of Sciences.

== Early life and education ==
Howe grew up in Old Saybrook, Connecticut before his family moved to Raleigh, North Carolina when he was nine. Following high school, he completed his Bachelor of Science degree in biology from East Carolina University. Upon completing his undergraduate degree, Howe was selected as the 1984-85 Burroughs Wellcome Research Fellow in biology at East Carolina University while earning his master's degree. He then worked for two years in the plant biotechnology industry before obtaining his Ph.D. in biology from the University of California, Los Angeles.

== Career ==
Following his PhD, Howe conducted postdoctoral work at Washington State University and then joined the faculty at Michigan State University (MSU) in 1997. As a Professor of biochemistry and molecular biology, Howe made a number of seminal contributions to the understanding of biosynthesis, perception, and role in the defence of the plant hormone jasmonate. In 2007, he worked alongside Sheng Yang He to reveal the steps that convert jasmonate's signal into genetic and cellular action. They became the first to identify a receptor for jasmonate and demonstrate that it was vital to protecting healthy tissues in injured plants. Following this discovery, Howe continued to study the molecular evolution of chemical traits that shape plant-insect interactions. Howe continued to work with Yang He throughout his early tenure at the institution. Shortly after receiving the award, the pair published the first study to reveal a molecular view of how plants ward off attacks by insects and pathogens. His research efforts earned him MSU's 2010 Merits Distinguished Faculty Award and an election to the American Association for the Advancement of Science.

During his later tenure at MSU, Howe continued to conduct breakthrough research and earn national recognition. In 2015, Howe was a member of a research team which published the first example of using receptor engineering to fix a disease-vulnerable component of the plant immune system. The following year, his laboratory created a plant (jazQ) for the purpose of challenging the conception that plants could not grow or defend themselves at the same time. His research team randomly mutated thousands of jazQ plants and found that the specific mutation which removed a photoreceptor also allowed the plant to grow faster. This subsequently challenged the idea that defense-growth trade-offs were caused by diversion of limited resources to one process at the expense of another. At the conclusion of the year, Howe was recognized by Thomson Reuters as being among the highest cited researchers of his field. In April 2017, Howe was elected a Fellow of the American Society of Plant Biologists and received the MSU Innovation Center Award for his "pioneering work challenging a long-held assumption that plants cannot both grow and defend optimally at the same time." Within the next two months, Howe was also appointed a University Distinguished Professor and an MSU Foundation Professor.

In May 2020, Howe was elected a Member of the National Academy of Sciences for making "important contributions to our understanding of the complex biochemical mechanisms through which plants respond to challenges such as insect attack." He was later selected as a Fulbright US Scholar to support his research on the major societal challenges of food security and sustainability in Japan.

== Personal life ==
While completing his postdoctoral work at Washington State University, Howe married Darcy Rowles in 1997.
