= Christoph Benning =

German-American plant biology researcher

- Born: 1960 (age 65–66); Soest, Germany
- Spouse: Susanne Hoffmann–Benning

Academic background
- Education: MSc, 1986, University of Freiburg; PhD, 1991, Michigan State University
- Thesis: Genetic analysis of the pathway for the biosynthesis of the plant sulfolipid in the purple bacterium Rhodobacter sphaeroides (1991)

Christoph Benning (born 1960) is a German–American plant biologist. He is an MSU Foundation Professor and University Distinguished Professor at Michigan State University. Benning's research into lipid metabolism in plants, algae and photosynthetic bacteria, led him to be named Editor-in-Chief of The Plant Journal in October 2008.

== Early life and education ==
Benning was born in Soest, Germany, in 1960. He completed his Master of Science degree at the University of Freiburg before moving to North America for his PhD at Michigan State University (MSU). During his time at the University of Freiburg, Benning received a 10-month international travel fellowship from the German Scholarship Foundation.

== Career ==
Following his PhD, Benning remained in Michigan while his wife Susanne Hoffmann–Benning finished her PhD work with Hans Kende. In 1993, he accepted a leadership position at the Institute for Gene Biology Research in Germany before moving back to MSU as an assistant professor in the Department of Biochemistry and Molecular Biology in 1998.

Benning has been working for over 30 years on different aspects of lipid metabolism in photosynthetic organisms. His laboratory at MSU discovered and studies proteins involved in the biosynthesis of polar lipids of the photosynthetic membrane, the exchange of membrane lipid precursors between the endoplasmic reticulum, the chloroplast envelope membranes and the respective contact sites, and proteins involved in lipid remodeling as adaption to abiotic stresses. Benning's lab discovered a transcription factor governing the biosynthesis of storage lipids in plant embryos and used it for biotechnological applications. His lab has also applied genomic and genetic approaches to identify key regulatory factors and enzymes required for triacylglycerol biosynthesis, lipid droplet formation and lipid turnover in the microalgae Chlamydomonas reinhardtii. He coordinated the sequencing and publication of the first Nannochloropsis oceanica genome and he and his collaborators developed synthetic biology tools for this microalga and explored its biotechnological potential.

Benning's research into lipid metabolism in plants, algae and photosynthetic bacteria, led him to be named Editor-in-Chief of The Plant Journal in October 2008. The following year, his research team licensed the technology that could enhance plants' seed oil content for food and animal feed applications. Using this technology, Benning's laboratory showed that researchers could use an algae gene to engineer a plant that stores lipids or vegetable oil in its leaves. In August 2010, Benning was recognized as "an outstanding scientist who continues to make highly significant contributions to the field of plant lipid research" with the Terry Galliard Award at the International Symposium on Plant Lipids. He was later elected a Fellow of the American Association for the Advancement of Science in 2014 and promoted to MSU Foundation Professor in 2015.

As an MSU Foundation Professor, Benning was also appointed director of MSU-DOE Plant Research Laboratory in August 2015 as the successor to Michael Thomashow. In this role, he received the 2018 MSU Innovator of the Year Award with John Ohlrogge for identifying the WRINKELD1 gene and developing its use to engineer plant oils and lipids. Following the 2018–19 academic year, Benning was promoted to University Distinguished Professor, the highest honor MSU could bestow onto a faculty member. He was later recognized in the 2019 Highly Cited Researchers List compiled by Clarivate Analytics for the first time. He was recognized again in 2021 and was also elected a Senior Member of the National Academy of Inventors. In November 2022, Benning's laboratory received a National Science Foundation grant to examine how the chloroplast reacts to stress responses in the model plant Arabidopsis thaliana. In 2025, Benning was elected to the National Academy of Sciences.

== Honors and awards ==
- Outstanding Faculty Award, MSU College of Natural Science, 2008
- William J. Beal Outstanding Faculty award, 2009
- Terry Galliard Medal, 19th International Symposium on Plant Lipids, 2010
- Postdoctoral Mentoring Award, MSU College of Natural Science, 2013
- Fellow, American Association for the Advancement of Science, 2014
- Graduate Advisor Award, MSU College of Natural Science, 2014
- MSU Innovator of the Year Award shared with John Ohlrogge, 2018
- Highly Cited Researcher, Clarivate Analytics, Web of Science Group, 2019-2021
- Senior Member, National Academy of Inventors, 2022
- Member, National Academy of Sciences, 2025
- Fellow, American Society of Plant Biologists, 2025
