= Biodesign Institute =

Research center at Arizona State University

ASU Biodesign Institute

General information
- Type: Research Institute
- Location: Arizona State University: Tempe Campus, 727 E. Tyler St. Tempe, Arizona 85287
- Coordinates: 33°25′10″N 111°55′41″W
- Construction started: Building A – February 2003; Building B – March 2004; Building C – October 2016; Building D – TBD
- Completed: Building A – January 2005; Building B – January 2006; Building C – September 2018; Building D – TBD
- Cost: Building A – $72.8 million Building B – $78.5 million Building C – $120 million Building D – TBD
- Owner: Arizona State University

Technical details
- Structural system: Brick and glass curtain wall system, steel frame, concrete flooring
- Floor count: 6
- Floor area: Building A – 183,220 s.f. Building B – 179,800 s.f Building C – 191,035 s.f. Building D – TBD

Design and construction
- Architecture firm: Buildings A & B – Gould Evans / Lord Aeck & Sargent; Building C – ZGF Architects / BWS Architects; Building D – TBD
- Main contractor: Buildings A & B – DPR Construction / Sundt Corp. Building C – McCarthy Construction; Building D – TBD
- Awards: Building A – Gold-level LEED certified Building B – Platinum-level LEED certified Building C – TBD

Website
- biodesign.asu.edu
- Building A https://fdm-apps.asu.edu/UFRM/FDS/FacilityData.aspx?bNum=104A; Building B https://fdm-apps.asu.edu/UFRM/FDS/FacilityData.aspx?bNum=104B; Building C https://fdm-apps.asu.edu/UFRM/FDS/FacilityData.aspx?bNum=104C

The Biodesign Institute is a major research center known for nature-inspired solutions to global health, sustainability, and security challenges located on the Tempe campus of Arizona State University. The institute is organized into a growing number of collaborative research centers and laboratories staffed by scientists in diverse disciplines. It is currently led by Executive Director Dr. Joshua LaBaer, a personalized diagnostics researcher.

== Overview ==
The Biodesign Institute performs biomedical and health research and develops solutions for environmental sustainability. The institute has more than 1300 faculty, staff and students, which include one Nobel Prize winner and multiple National Academy members. The institute has attracted more than $930 million in extramural funding, filed 860 invention disclosures, nearly 200 patents, and 35 spinouts.

The Biodesign Institute is located on the Tempe campus of Arizona State University, a comprehensive multi-campus metropolitan university that is the largest in the U.S. by enrollment. The labs are housed in multiple buildings covering nearly 540,000 sqft.

== COVID-19 response ==
During the COVID-19 pandemic, the institute took a lead role and established a clinical testing laboratory, and processed over one million tests. The institute has developed a saliva based testing and got emergency approval from FDA. The institute was named one of the Governor's Celebration of Innovation's Innovators of the Year for their work on saliva-based COVID-19 tests. The institute received a $6 million state contract to develop a rapid 20-minute saliva testing.

== Centers within the institute ==
- ASU-Banner Neurodegenerative Disease Research Center
- Biodesign Center for Applied Structural Discovery
- Biodesign Center for Biocomputing, Security and Society
- Biodesign Center for Bioelectronics and Biosensors
- Biodesign Center for Bioenergetics
- Biodesign Center for Biomaterials Innovation and Translation
- Biodesign Swette Center for Environmental Biotechnology
- Biodesign Center for Environmental Health Engineering
- Biodesign Center for Fundamental and Applied Microbiomics
- Biodesign Center for Health Through Microbiomes
- Biodesign Center for Mechanisms of Evolution
- Biodesign Center for Molecular Design and Biomimetics
- Pathfinder Center
- Biodesign Center for Single Molecule Biophysics
- Biodesign Center for Sustainable Macromolecular Materials and Manufacturing
- Virginia G. Piper Center for Personalized Diagnostics

== Leadership ==
- Joshua LaBaer, a physician-scientist specializing in personalized diagnostics, was appointed interim executive director of the Biodesign Institute in January 2016. He became permanent executive director in March 2017.
- Raymond DuBois, a physician-scientist with expertise in translational cancer research, was appointed executive director of the Biodesign Institute on December 1, 2012.
- Alan Nelson, an entrepreneur and a developer of a number of medical devices, was the executive director of the Biodesign Institute from March 2009 to July 2011.
- The institute was formerly led by George Poste, a scientist and policy maker with four decades of experience spanning academia, industry and government. Dr. Poste's experience in fostering scientific collaboration has shaped the institute's organization and has facilitated recruitment of international-caliber scientists to the institute.
- Charles Arntzen served as the founding director of the Biodesign Institute until May 2003, and as co-director of the Center for Infectious Diseases and Vaccinology of that Institute until 2007.

== Landscape ==
Designed by Ten Eyck Landscape Architects as a "green gateway" to the research facility set within the desert the landscape of the Biodesign Institute uses harvested stormwater and condensate to function as a riparian area. The 4-acre site aims "to create an environment that is about healing and sustaining life". TELA achieved this by replacing the prevalent asphalt with "permeable, vibrant, shade-giving regional gardens with plants used for healing purposes", using recycled water to feed these gardens, and most importantly "connecting people in an urban setting...with the natural beauty of our long ago altered Sonoran Desert". Beyond the gardens, the site features bike lanes, pedestrian malls, seatwalls, and bioswales that all function to bring people into contact with each other and nature. Upon completion, the project won an ASLA Honor Award in the General Design Category in 2009. In 2025, Biodesign Institute's building C earned an Award of Distinction in the landscape design category at Arizona Forward's 43rd Annual Environmental Excellence Awards.

== Notable researchers ==
- Bruce Rittmann
- Petra Fromme
- Stephanie Forrest
- Michael Lynch
- Leland Hartwell

== Gallery ==
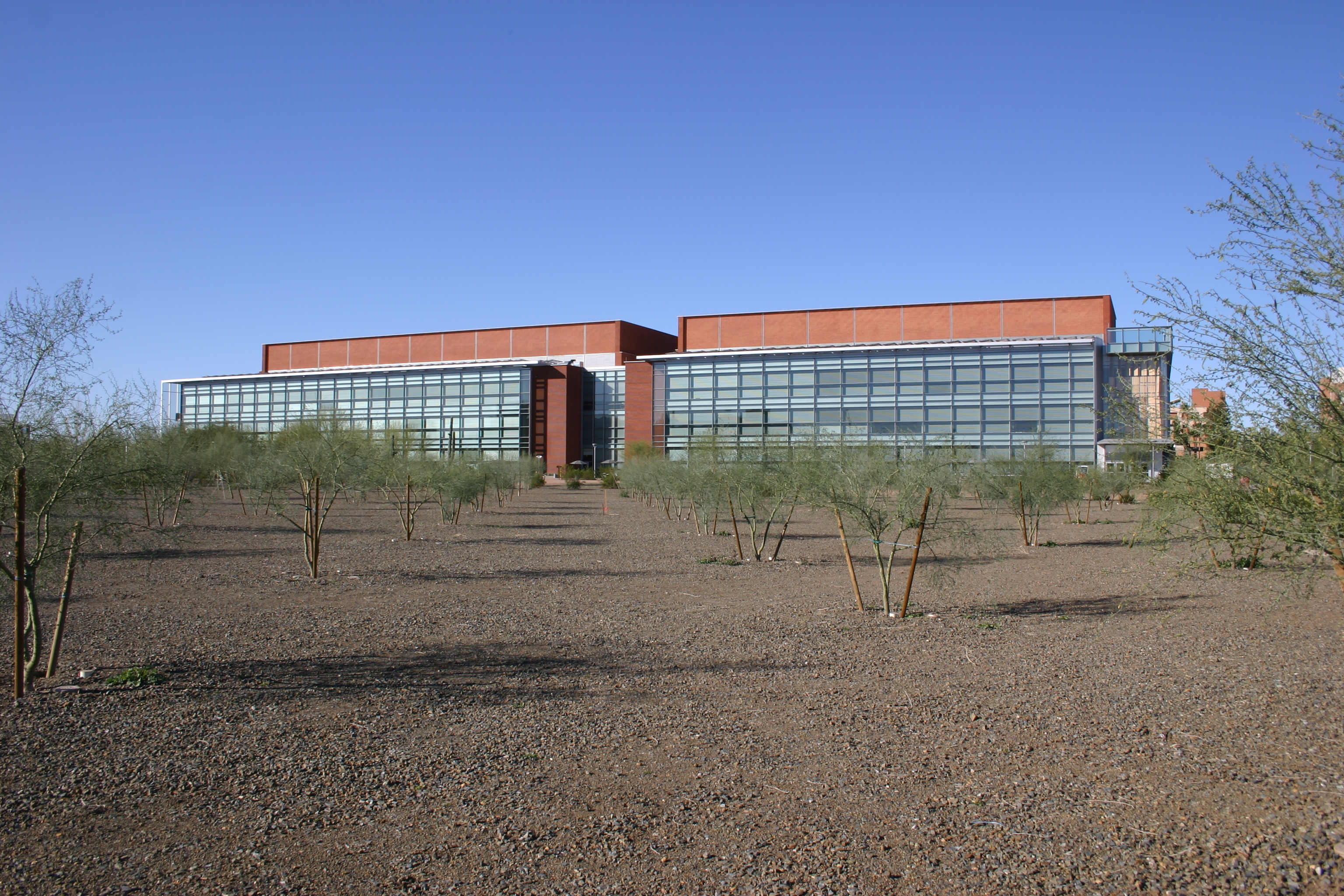
The east side of the Biodesign Institute building

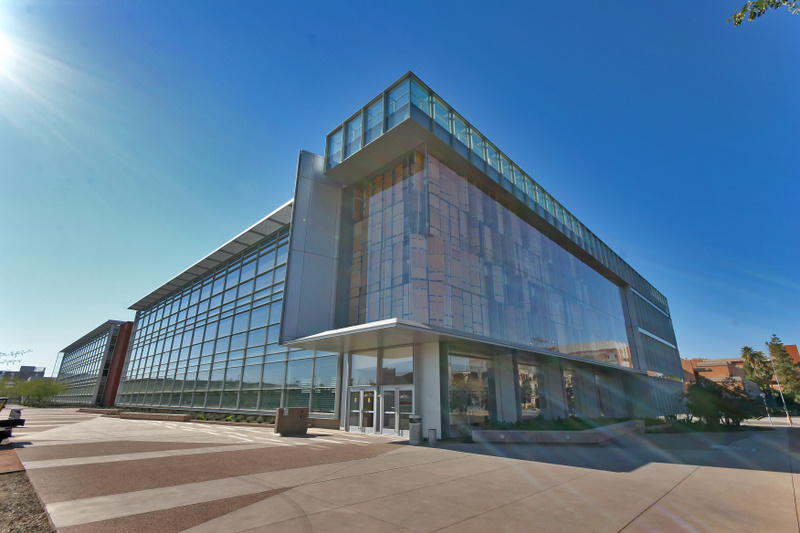
The main entrance to the Biodesign Institute building

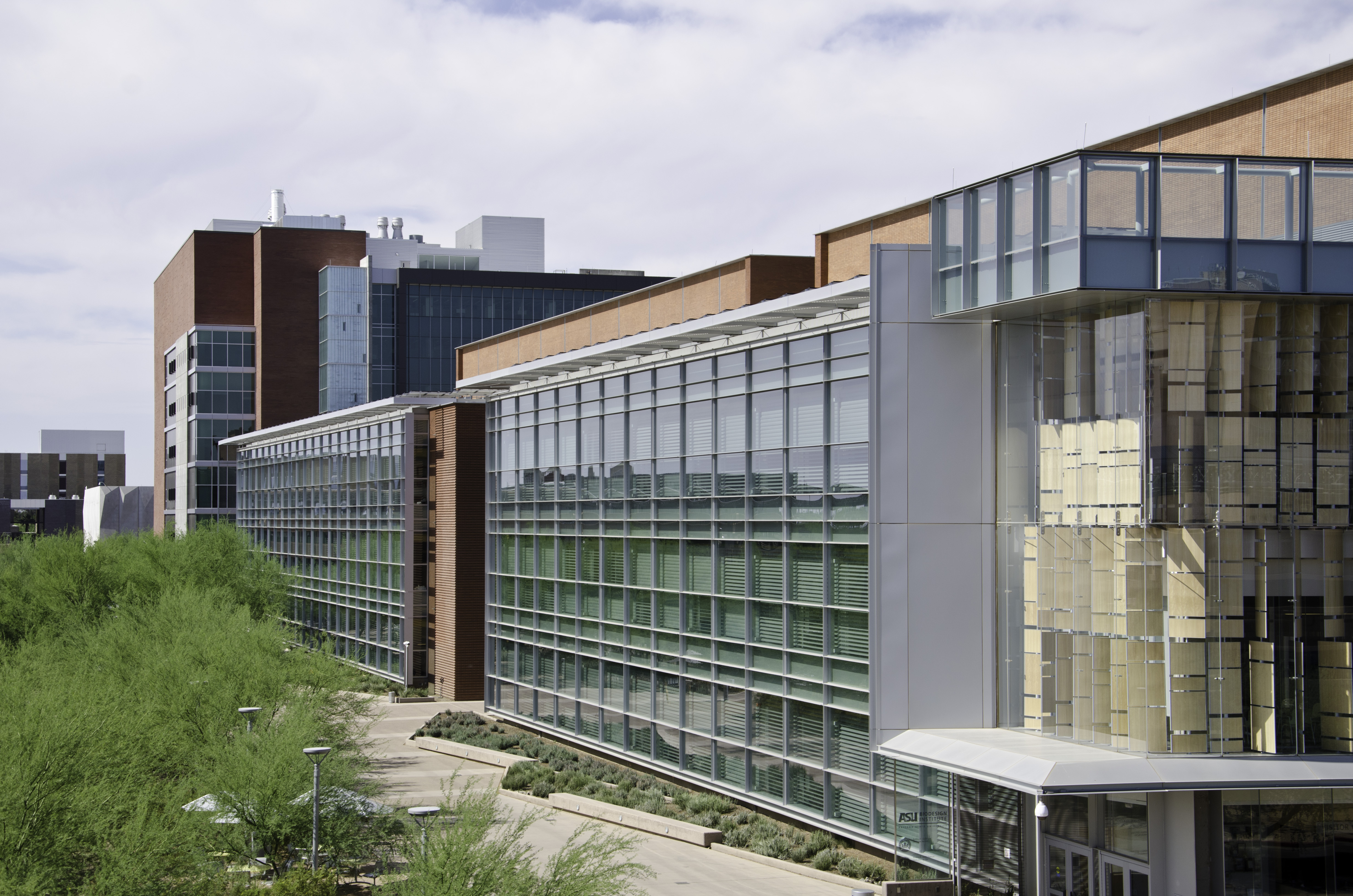
Biodesign Institute Buildings A & B

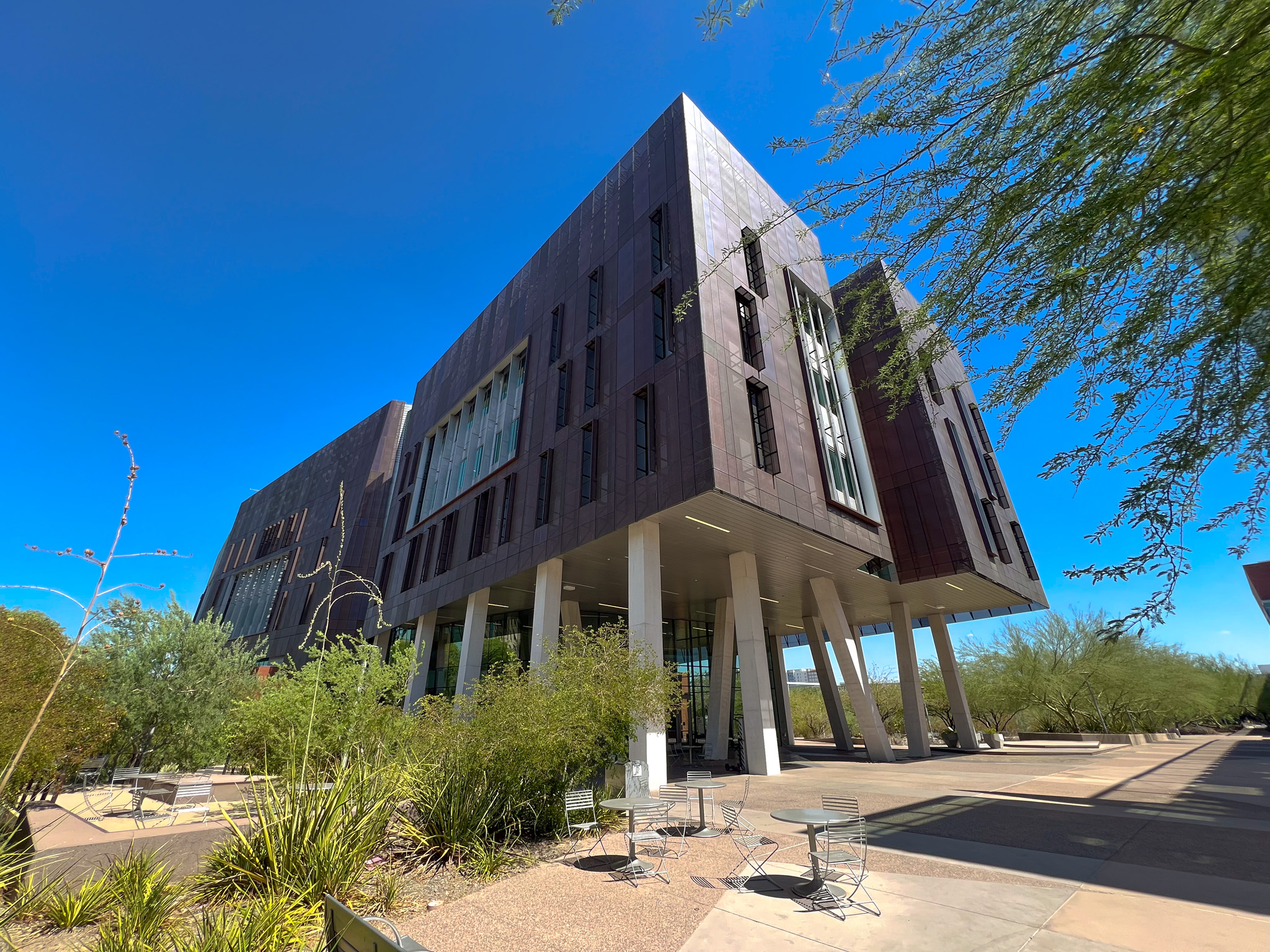
Biodesign Building C main entrance
