= Energy Biosciences Institute =

Organization for alternative-energy research

- Established: 2007
- Directors: John D. Coates, Chris R. Somerville
- Location: Berkeley, California
- Website: energybiosciencesinstitute.org

The Energy Biosciences Institute (EBI) is an organization dedicated to developing new sources of energy and reducing the impact of energy consumption. It was created in 2007 to apply advanced knowledge of biology to the challenges of responsible, sustainable energy production and use. Its main goal is to develop next-generation biofuels—that is, biofuels that are made from the non-edible parts of plants and reduce greenhouse gas emissions.

Funded by BP, which initially agreed to contribute $500 million over a 10-year-period, with $350 million slated for academic research, EBI is a joint initiative between the University of California, Berkeley (UCB), Lawrence Berkeley National Laboratory, the University of Illinois at Urbana-Champaign, and the energy company. It is the largest public-private venture of its kind. All research from its academic labs is published and publicly available. More information about the EBI is available to the public through the EBI Bulletin and its magazine, Bioenergy Connection, which cover emerging trends in the field of bioenergy.)

EBI was designed as a creative, multidisciplinary institution. Because bioenergy research is so complex, the institute promotes a holistic view by encouraging scientists from many disciplines – biology, chemistry, botany, environmental science, economics, and others – to collaborate on investigations. The institute's main research areas are:

- feedstock development (work on plant sources of biofuel)
- biomass depolymerization (breaking down the plant cell wall to enable sugar, or energy, extraction)
- biofuel production
- the environmental, social, and economic impact of bioenergy development
- fossil fuel bioprocessing (using microbial processes to help make oil recovery “greener” and to shrink its carbon footprint)

== Achievements ==
Since its inception in 2007, EBI has published nearly 500 papers in peer-reviewed journals, including Science and Nature. Among its significant investigations:

- Using a former industrial fermentation process, EBI scientists have developed a way to extract the acetone, butanol, and ethanol from a fermentation mixture and reformulate the products using chemical catalysts to produce diesel-like fuels.
- Designing modified yeast strains that could simultaneously use 5-carbon and 6-carbon sugars, an important step toward creating a platform EBI yeast strain for metabolic engineering
- Developing a series of chemical steps that convert sugars to diesel directly, without fermentation
- Holding annual conferences on the global bioeconomy and biofuel law and regulation
- Creating a 320-acre farm at the University of Illinois, where scientists monitor the gases emitted, the mineral content of water runoff, soil carbon, and plant and animal biodiversity
- Sharing and collaborating with scientists and visitors from the United States and many other countries, including Brazil, Norway, Argentina, China, the Netherlands, Germany, and India, at EBI's headquarters in Berkeley and the University of Illinois at Urbana-Champaign.

The EBI has come under scrutiny from some groups and individuals concerned about the influence of private corporations on public universities. Berkeley campus officials dismiss charges that academic freedom is at risk, noting that BP does not influence EBI's academic research agenda and that all research in EBI's academic labs is unclassified and published.

Critics also have expressed concerns about first-generation biofuels, such as corn ethanol, on food prices and the environment. EBI's focus is on next-generation biofuels, however, which include only non-food plant sources and agricultural waste material.
