= Petra Fromme =

German-American chemist

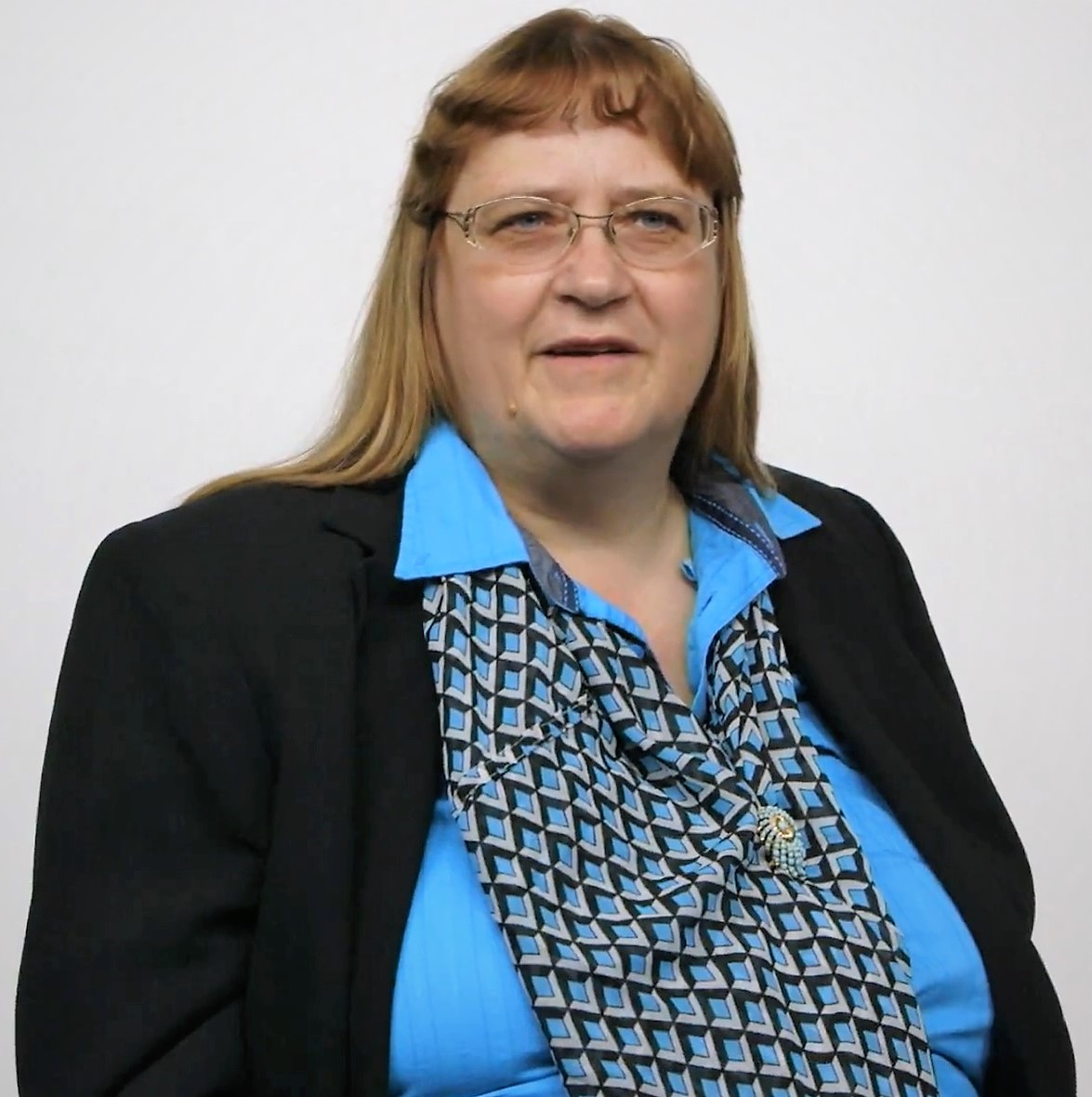
- Fromme in 2017
- Education: Technische Universität Berlin; Free University of Berlin
- Scientific career
- Workplaces: Arizona State University; Max Volmer Institute
- Thesis: Die ATP-Synthase aus Chloroplasten biochemische Untersuchungen zur Struktur und kinetische Messungen zum Mechanismus des Enzyms (1988)

Petra Fromme is a German-American chemist who is Director of the Biodesign Center for Applied Structural Discovery and Regents Professor at the Arizona State University. Her research considers the structure-to-function relationship of the membrane proteins involved with infectious diseases and bio-energy conversion. In 2021, she was awarded the Protein Society Anfinsen Award.

== Early life and education ==
Fromme was born in Germany. She attended the Free University of Berlin for undergraduate studies, where she majored in biochemistry. She moved to Technische Universität Berlin for her doctoral research, where she investigated the ATP synthase of chloroplasts.

== Research and career ==
Fromme's academic career started at the Max Volmer Institute, part of the TU Berlin. Fromme joined Arizona State University as a Professor of Molecular Sciences in 2002. She was named Paul V Galvin Professor in 2012. In 2014, Fromme was appointed Director of the Centre for Applied Structural Discovery. The following year she was selected as a Regents' Professor. At Arizona State, she oversaw the development of two compact X-ray accelerator systems, including an X-ray light source and an X-ray Free Electron Laser.

Fromme was amongst the first people to use high energy X-ray free-electron lasers to analyze proteins. These lasers, which produce extremely bright and ultra-short pulses of light, allow for serial femtosecond nanocrystallography. Whilst conventional high intensity X-ray pulses can damage the molecules they are interrogating, femtosecond pulses can permit the acquisition of diffraction patterns before the sample degrades. Femtosecond measurements allowed Fromme to establish the structure-property relationships of crucial biological systems, including ATP synthase, Photosystem I and Photosystem II. Nanocrystallography will allow for the development of more safe and effective drugs, as well as accelerating our understanding of material design for renewable energy sources.

In an effort to design new drugs, Fromme has studied the structure of disease-linked enzymes in the human body including Taspase I. The protease is involved with cell metabolism, proliferation, migration and termination, and its dysregulation is implicated in the genesis of various cancers. By investigating Taspase I with free-electron lasers, Fromme showed that there is a critical helical region which defines the protease activity, and eliminating this region can deactiviate the enzyome entirely. X-ray Free Electron Lasers also allowed for the characterisations of Francisella tularensis, the bacterium which gives rise to Tularemia.

She also has published and co published many scientific papers in many journals, like; Three-Dimensional structure of Cyanobacterial photosystem I at 2.5 Å resolution, Crystal Structure of photosystem II from Synechococcus elongatus at 3.8 Å resolution, Femtosecond X-ray protein nano-crystallography, Single mimivirus particulars intercepted and imaged with an X-Ray Laser, and so much more.

== Awards and honors ==
- 2013 Science Top 10 Breakthrough of the Year
- 2015 Phoenix New Times Best of Phoenix Award
- 2021 Fromme was awarded the Protein Society Anfinsen Award

== Selected publications ==
- P Jordan; P Fromme; H T Witt; O Klukas; W Saenger; Norbert Krauß (1 June 2001). "Three-dimensional structure of cyanobacterial photosystem I at 2.5 A resolution". Nature. 411 (6840): 909–917. doi:10.1038/35082000. ISSN 1476-4687. PMID 11418848. Wikidata Q27632715.
- Zouni A; Witt HT; Jan Kern; Fromme P; Norbert Krauß; Saenger W; Orth P (1 February 2001). "Crystal structure of photosystem II from Synechococcus elongatus at 3.8 A resolution". Nature. 409 (6821): 739–743. doi:10.1038/35055589. ISSN 1476-4687. PMID 11217865. Wikidata Q27629975.
- Henry N Chapman; Petra Fromme; Anton Barty; et al. (3 February 2011). "Femtosecond X-ray protein nanocrystallography". Nature. 470 (7332): 73–7. doi:10.1038/nature09750. ISSN 1476-4687. PMC 3429598. PMID 21293373. Wikidata Q27644346.

=== Books ===
- X-ray free electron lasers : a revolution in structural biology. Sébastien Boutet, Petra Fromme, Mark S. Hunter. Cham, Switzerland. 2018. ISBN 978-3-030-00551-1. OCLC 1081001197.
