= Michigan State University College of Natural Science =

MSU College for the natural sciences

MSU College of Natural Science
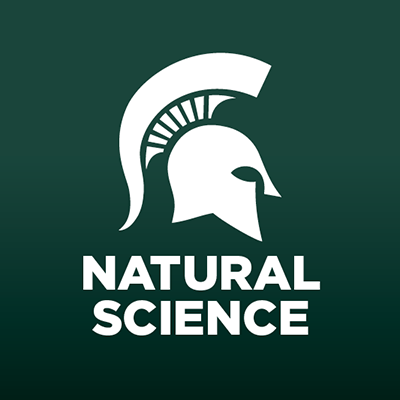
- Dean: Eric L. Hegg
- Academic staff: 400+
- Undergraduates: 6500
- Postgraduates: 1000
- Location: East Lansing, Michigan
- Website: natsci.msu.edu

The College of Natural Science (NatSci) at Michigan State University is home to 27 departments and programs in the biological, physical and mathematical sciences.

The college averages $83M in research expenditures annually and claims to have more than 6,500 undergraduate majors and nearly 1,000 graduate students. There are 730 faculty and academic staff associated with NatSci and more than 47,000 living alumni worldwide.

== Departments and programs ==
Departments

- Biochemistry and Molecular Biology
- Chemistry
- Computational Mathematics, Science and Engineering
- Earth and Environmental Sciences
- Mathematics
- Microbiology and Molecular Genetics
- Physics and Astronomy
- Physiology
- Plant Biology
- Statistics and Probability
- Integrative Biology

Additional Units

- Actuarial Science (Program)
- Advanced Microscopy (Center)
- Biological Sciences (Program)
- Biomedical Laboratory Diagnostics (Program)
- Cell and Molecular Biology (Program)
- Charles Drew Science Scholars (Program)
- Ecology, Evolution, and Behavior (Program)
- Genetics (Program)
- CREATE for STEM (Institute)
- Human Biology (Program)
- Integrative Studies in General Science (Center)
- Kellogg Biological Station (Program)
- Mathematics Education (Program)
- Neuroscience (Program)
- Plant Research Lab (Program)
- Plant Resilience Institute (Center)
- Quantitative biology (Program)
- Residential Initiative on the Study of the Environment (Program)

== Undergraduate studies ==
The college offers both Bachelor of Science (BS) and Bachelor of Arts (BA) degrees.

- The BS requires more science and mathematics credits and less non-science, humanities and social science coursework in the 120-credit program. The BS is intended for individuals preparing for professional work in the sciences or for graduate/professional school.
- The BA is designed for individuals pursuing K-12 teaching careers or scientific application areas such as public policy, technical sales, law, and communications. The BA requires more humanities and social science credits, thus providing greater balance between science and non-science credits in the 120 credit program.

Majors in the college include:

- Biochemistry and Molecular Biology
- Biological Science (Interdepartmental; For teaching majors only)
- Biomedical Laboratory Diagnostics (formerly titled Medical Technology Program)
- Clinical Laboratory Science
- Diagnostic Molecular Science
- Medical Technology
- Chemical Physics
- Chemistry
- Computational Chemistry
- Earth Science
- Environmental Studies
- Environmental Biology/Plant Biology
- Environmental Biology/Microbiology
- Environmental Biology/Zoology
- Specialization in Environmental Studies
- Geological Sciences
- Environmental Geosciences
- Geological Sciences
- Geophysics
- Human Biology
- Mathematics
- Actuarial Science Specialization
- Computational Mathematics
- Mathematics
- Microbiology and Molecular Genetics
- Genomics and Molecular Genetics
- Nutritional Science
- Physical Science (Interdepartmental; For teaching majors only)
- Physics and Astronomy
- Astrophysics
- Physics
- Physics and Geophysics
- Physiology
- Plant Biology
- Environmental Biology/Plant Biology
- Preprofessional Coursework (Pre-med, etc.)
- Statistics
- Zoology

=== Dean's Research Scholars ===
The Dean's Research Scholars are a group of outstanding undergraduate students who represent the nearly 5,000 hard-working science and mathematics majors in the College of Natural Science.

Scholars are named for a 12-month term from May through the following May. During that time, scholars will participate in the following:

- 2-4 College of Natural Science events or speaking engagements;
- Attend an orientation meeting on being a Dean's Research Scholar in August (usually the Monday or Tuesday before classes begin);
- Attend the NatSci Alumni Awards program;
- Participate in a panel discussion during Classes Without Quizzes;
- Write a student point-of-view during the school year for posting in MSU Today.

==== Criteria for becoming a Dean's Research Scholar ====
- Scholars must be enrolled full-time (12 or more credits/semester) in a major in the College of Natural Science (Lyman Briggs majors are not eligible). Students may have additional majors in other colleges, but their primary major must be in Natural Science.
- Scholars must have completed at least one semester of research with an MSU faculty mentor (the faculty mentor can be from any college, not just Natural Science) prior to application.

=== RISE and Drew Scholars ===
Two special undergraduate programs are in place for students: RISE or Residential Initiative on the Study of the Environment is for MSU students interested in stewardship of the environment.

Charles Drew Science Scholars is a program providing academic and social support for high achieving students pursuing science and math degrees, including individuals interested in professional health and science careers, such as, medicine, veterinary medicine, dentistry, research, pharmacology, optometry, physical therapy, and public health.

=== Study Abroad, Study Away ===
NatSci also offers a Study Abroad and Study Away off-campus programs in:

- Africa – Kenya, Tanzania, Uganda,
- Americas – Ecuador, Galapagos Islands, Costa Rica, Virgin Islands
- Antarctica
- Asia – India, Borneo
- Europe – Germany, United Kingdom, Switzerland
- Oceania – Australia, New Zealand
- Florida – Orlando, Gainesville
- Hawaii
- Alaska
- Michigan – Upper Peninsula, Isle Royale, Battle Creek

== Graduate studies ==
Advanced study is available through the following degree programs and specializations:

- Astrophysics and Astronomy
- Biochemistry and Molecular Biology
- Biomedical Laboratory Diagnostics
- Cell and Molecular Biology
- Cell, Molecular, and Structural Biology
- Chemistry
- Cognitive Science
- Ecology, Evolution, and Behavior
- Entomology
- Environmental Science and Policy
- Environmental Toxicology
- Food Science
- Genetics
- Geological Sciences
- Human Nutrition
- Mathematics
- Microbiology and Molecular Genetics
- Neuroscience
- Pharmacology and Toxicology
- Physics
- Physiology
- Plant Biology
- Quantitative Biology and Modeling
- Science and Mathematics Education
- Statistics and Probability
- Certification in Teaching College Science and Mathematics
- Zoology

=== Professional Science Masters (PSM) programs ===
The College of Natural Science offers several PSM degrees to prepare and train students in technical areas for positions in industry. The PSM is a professional M.S. degree in science or mathematics for students interested in a wider variety of career options than provided by current graduate programs in the sciences and mathematics.

The three areas of program development include:

- In-depth technical training in a science discipline,
- College certification of training in basic business practice including communication and presentation skills,
- Industrial internship or industrial case studies, developed in cooperation with industrial affiliates.

PSM Programs:

- Biomedical Laboratory Operations
- Food Safety
- Industrial Mathematics
- Integrative Pharmacology
- Zoo & Aquarium Science

=== Science and mathematics teachers ===
NatSci offers master's degrees and certificates for science and mathematics teachers. These programs are coordinated with MSU's College of Education. For Mathematics Education, the program is administered by Program for Mathematics Education, or PRIME. For Science Education, the program is administered by the Center for Integrative Studies in General Science, or CISGS, under the "Integrated Science Education" area.

== Research centers, institutes and facilities ==
The college has a variety of resources available to researchers.

- BEACON: Biocomputational Evolution in Action Consortium
- Institute for Research on Mathematics and Science Education
- Center for Microbial Ecology
- Center for Statistical Training and Consulting
- Center for the Study of Cosmic Evolution
- Composite Materials and Structure Center
- Institute for Quantum Sciences
- Joint Institute for Nuclear Astrophysics
- National Food Safety and Toxicology Center
- Albert J. Cook Arthropod Research Collection
- Center for Advanced Microscopy
- Herbarium
- High Performance Computing Center
- Kellogg Biological Station
- Max T. Rogers NMR Facility
- MSU/DoE Plant Research Laboratory
- National Superconducting Cyclotron Laboratory
- Protein Expression Laboratory
- Research Technology Support Facility
- SOAR Telescope

== Administration ==
Eric L. Hegg began serving as dean of Michigan State University’s College of Natural Science on September 6, 2024. Hegg brings a wealth of experience and a dynamic vision with the college’s commitment to STEM education, research, and community engagement. His leadership style is inclusive and forward-thinking and promises to build on our strong foundation while exploring new opportunities for innovation and growth.

Hegg joined the Department of Biochemistry & Molecular Biology in 2006. His previous role was as the Associate Dean for Budget, Planning, Research, and Administration in the College of Natural Science, a position he held since January 2020. In his role as Associate Dean, Hegg helped oversee the college’s general fund operating budget, helped develop funding requests to the MSU administration, managed the College of Natural Science space and research infrastructures, worked with college chairs and directors in the recruitment and retention of faculty, and helped managed day-to-day operations of the dean’s office budget. In addition, Hegg was part of the team that developed the college strategic plan, and he represented NatSci on numerous internal advisory boards at the university.

Prior to accepting the role of Associate Dean for the college, Dean Hegg served for approximately seven years as the Director of Business Operations for the MSU component of the Great Lakes Bioenergy Research Center. In this capacity he helped manage the subcontract and oversaw the MSU business and human resource activities of the center.

Dean Hegg’s research is at the interface between chemistry and biochemistry where he focuses on environmentally important processes, including biofuel production and enzymes involved in the global nitrogen cycle. He has authored nearly 80 manuscripts and book chapters, holds 4 patents with another 3 patents pending, and his lab has been supported by funding from a variety of different organizations including the Air Force Office of Scientific Research, U.S. Department of Energy, National Institutes of Health, National Science Foundation and U.S. Department of Agriculture. He has mentored nearly 100 students and postdoctoral researchers in his lab, including over 50 undergraduate students.

Dean Hegg was elected as a Fellow of the American Association for the Advancement of Science (AAAS). He also received the Cottrell Scholar Award which recognizes outstanding teacher-scholars.

Prior to MSU, Dean Hegg was on the faculty at the University of Utah in the Department of Chemistry. Hegg earned his Ph.D. from the University of Wisconsin and was an NIH Postdoctoral Fellow at the University of Minnesota prior to joining the faculty at the University of Utah.
