= Charles Arntzen =

American engineer

Charles Joel Arntzen (born 1941) is a plant molecular biologist. His major contributions are in the field of "plant molecular biology and protein engineering, as well as the utilization of plant biotechnology for enhancement of food quality and value, for expression of pharmacological products in transgenic plants, and for overcoming health and agricultural constraints in the developing world."

== Career ==
In 2017, Charles Arntzen retired from Arizona State University as an emeritus professor. He had been appointed to the Florence Ely Nelson Presidential Endowed Chair at ASU in Tempe in 2000. He was the Founding Director of the Biodesign Institute (previously identified as the Arizona Biomedical Institute) from 2001 to 2003, and served as the co-director of the Center for Infectious Diseases and Vaccinology with Processor Roy Curtiss until 2007. Prior to joining ASU, Arntzen served as president and CEO of Boyce Thompson Institute - a not-for-profit corporation affiliated with Cornell University. Earlier administrative experience included service as director of research at the Dupont Company in Wilmington, Delaware.

He had also been the deputy chancellor for agriculture; dean, College of Agriculture and Life Sciences; and director of the Texas Agricultural Experiment Station in the Texas A&M University System. While at TAMU he led the development of the Institute of Biosciences Technology in the Texas Medical Center, Houston. Arntzen began his academic career in 1969 at the University of Illinois, Urbana, and jointly held an appointment as a scientist in the US Department of Agriculture (USDA). In 1980 he moved to Michigan State University to become the director of MSU's Department of Energy Plant Research Laboratory (PRL), a position he held until being recruited to join the DuPont Company.

Throughout his career, Arntzen participated in and was funded by multiple international projects, including research in India, Egypt, Australia, China, Japan, Israel and Europe. In 1973-1974 and also in 1976 he held an appointment in the Laboratoire de Photosynthèse du CNRS, Gif-sur-Yvette, France. In 1981 he served as a fellow in the Department of Applied Mathematics of the Australian National University, Canberra, and in 1983 he was an Academia Sinica Visiting Scientist in Beijing and other locations in China. He was awarded a Doctor of Philosophiae honoris causa. from the Hebrew University of Jerusalem in 2008.

Arntzen was elected member of the US National Academy of Sciences in 1983. He is also a foreign fellow of the National Academy of Sciences, India. He is a Fellow of The American Association for the Advancement of Science and received the Award for Superior Service from the USDA for international project leadership in India. He was a member of the executive committee of the board of governors of The University of Chicago for Argonne National Laboratory and served as chairperson of their science and technology advisory committee. He served as chairman of the National Biotechnology Policy Board of the National Institutes of Health, as chairman of the National Research Council's Committee on Biobased Industrial Products and on the National Research Council's Committee on Space Biology and Medicine. Arntzen served for eight years on the editorial board of SCIENCE. He also served as a distinguished advisor on the Council for Biotechnology and was on the board of directors of the National Center for Genome Resources.

In 2001 Arntzen was appointed as a member of President George W. Bush's Presidential Council of Advisors on Science & Technology (PCAST), and in 2004 received a presidential appointment to serve on the National Nanotechnology Oversight Board; both of these appointments continued through the Bush presidency.

== Research ==
Arntzen's research focus spans plant cell-molecular biology and protein engineering. He was an early proponent of using plant biotechnology to enhance food quality and value, to express pharmacologically active products in plants, and to overcome health and agricultural constraints in the developing world. He is a pioneer in the development of plant-based vaccines for human disease prevention with special emphasis on needs of poor countries and disease prevention in animal agriculture. After 2001, this research was extended to the creation of effective vaccines and therapeutics to reduce the threats of biowarfare agents. Research initiated at ASU and funded by the US Army in 2002 focused on use of tobacco to bio-manufacture vaccines and monoclonal antibodies to prevent for treat disease caused by potential biological warfare agents. In 2011, he and his team at the Biodesign Institute were developing a vaccine for the Ebola virus using mice. An outcome of this research was the creation of ZMapp, a therapeutic used to treat Ebola patients. Fast Company chose him as the Most Creative Person in Business in 2015 for his work on fighting Ebola with tobacco-made therapeutics.

In addition to his employment with DuPont, Arntzen's private sector service includes past membership on the Board of Directors of DeKalb Genetics Corporation (prior to sale to Monsanto) and Board of Directors for Axis Genetics in Cambridge, UK. He also served on the Board of Directors of Advanced BioNutrition Corporation. He is an inventor on multiple U.S. and international patents and was named a Fellow in the U.S. National Academy of Inventors in 2015.
