= Sheng Yang He =

Chinese-American plant biologist

Sheng Yang He (Chinese: 何胜洋; pinyin: Hé Shèngyáng; born 1963) is a Chinese-American plant biologist. He was a University Distinguished Professor at Michigan State University before moving to Duke University in 2020. He has been a Howard Hughes Medical Institute Investigator since 2011. He served as President of the International Society for Molecular Plant-Microbe Interactions from 2014 to 2016. Recognized for his research on plant pathology on the molecular level, he was elected to the US National Academy of Sciences in 2015.

== Biography ==
He was born in Ningbo, Zhejiang, China in 1963 and became aware of the importance of crop protection at an early age. He studied at Zhejiang Agricultural University (now part of Zhejiang University), where he earned his bachelor's degree in 1982 and his master's in plant protection in 1985. He subsequently moved to the United States to study at Cornell University, earning his Ph.D. in plant pathology in 1991.

After conducting postdoctoral research at Cornell, He taught at the University of Kentucky in 1993 before moving to Michigan State University in 1995. He was the University Distinguished Professor in three departments of MSU: Plant Biology, Plant Soil and Microbial Sciences, and Microbiology and Molecular Genetics. He is a member of the editorial board for Current Biology.

He is known for his research on plant pathology on the molecular level. His research focuses include bacterial effector proteins, the immune function of stomata in plants, and jasmonate signaling.
