= Mendel Biotechnology =

Mendel Biotechnology, Inc.
- Company type: Privately held
- Industry: Agriculture
- Founded: 1997
- Headquarters: Hayward, California, United States
- Area served: United States, Europe, China
- Products: Biotechnology
- Website: http://www.mbi-holdings.com/

Mendel Biotechnology, Inc. is a plant biotechnology company, founded in 1997, and based in the San Francisco Bay Area, California. It currently operates as an IP holding company for assets relating to crop genetic traits.

In December 2014, Mendel sold its R&D operations and certain assets relating to the discovery and development of agricultural biological products to a subsidiary of Koch Agronomic Services, a business division of Koch Industries. Koch founded a new business unit, Koch Biological Solutions, based on the acquired assets and sourced additional near-to-market biological technologies through in-licenses, supply agreements and strategic investments. This business unit also operated under the name Mendel Biological Solutions. In November 2019, Koch Biological Solutions was spun out of Koch and merged with another company, Plant Response Biotech, to form Plant Response Inc. Plant Response was acquired by the fertilizer company Mosaic in the spring of 2022.

Mendel undertook research into transcription factors over a 17-year period, and patented the use of transcription factor-based technologies in manipulating crop plant traits.

Since its inception, Mendel collaborated with Monsanto. The multinational corporation funded certain agricultural biotechnology research undertaken by Mendel. Mendel also collaborated with BP, Bayer CropScience and others.
