= Dominique Bergmann =

American plant cell biologist

Dominique C. Bergmann is a plant scientist with a specific focus on developmental biology and plant biology. Correspondingly, she is a professor of Biology at Stanford University and is in association with the Stanford Institute for Stem Cell Biology and Regenerative Medicine. Additionally, Bergmann is also an Investigator of the Howard Hughes Medical Institute.

For several years she was a Gordon and Betty Moore HHMI funded researcher.

== Academic life ==
Bergmann was born and raised in east Pennsylvania, but she soon migrated West in order to pursue her dreams of studying developmental and plant biology at the University of California, Berkeley, where she completed her Bachelor of Arts in molecular and cellular biology, in 1993. After moving to University of Colorado Boulder, she began to study the development in C. elegans and later went on to graduate with a PhD in animal biology, in 2000. She quickly developed an interest in the science of Arabidopsis whilst working as a post-doc at the Carnegie Institution, Department of Plant Biology.

She is a member of the Editorial Board for PNAS.

== Inspiration ==
Claiming that she was not a "young naturalist", Bergmann was much more interested in constructing things, exploding things and launching things into the air. After later becoming intrigued by the idea of Biology (Biochemistry in particular), she knew that she had uncovered the right balance between experimental accuracy and real-life effect, so she decided to take things further and study molecular genetics.

== Current Research ==
Focusing specifically on "Asymmetry, Fate and Renewal in Plant Development", Bergmann uses the development of stomata as a model to study cell fate, the self renewal of stem cells and cell polarity in plants. Bergmann, along with her team (collectively known as "The Bergmann Lab"), use a large variety of genetic, genomic and imaging methods to inquire into different variations of cell development, and they are also examining gene expression in singular cells. Through their research, their goal is to uncover the differing elements in nature that ensure that cells can restore themselves and create utile final products. This specific work will help to shed light on how plants are capable of redirecting growth in the image of damage or environmental transformations.

== Awards and honours ==
Bergmann won the American Society of Plant Biologists' Charles Schull Award in 2010. Also in 2010, Bergmann was an Obama-era recipient of the Presidential Early Career Award for Scientists and Engineers. and subsequently won a prize for it. She was also elected into the National Academy of Sciences in 2017.
