= Xuemei Chen =

Chinese-American molecular biologist

- 陈雪梅
- Born: 1966 (age 59–60); Harbin, Heilongjiang, China
- Education: B.A plant physiology and biochemistry, Peking University (1988): Ph.D biochemistry, Cornell University (1995)
- Organization: Sigma Xi
- Title: Furuta Chair Professor (2010-present)
- Awards: American Society of Plant Biologists's Charles Albert Shull award
- Website: cepceb.ucr.edu/people/chen.html

Xuemei Chen (Chinese: 陈雪梅; born 1966) is a Chinese-American molecular biologist. She is the Furuta Chair Professor in the Department of Botany and Plant Sciences at the University of California, Riverside. She was elected to the US National Academy of Sciences in 2013.

== Early life and education ==
Chen tied the top high school exam score in her province and was allowed to study plant physiology at Peking University, where she graduated in 1988. The China-United States Biochemistry Examination and Application program awarded her a scholarship to graduate school at Cornell University. While at Cornell's Boyce Thompson Institute she studied the gene expression of chloroplasts and earned her Ph.D. in 1995. Her postdoctoral work was carried out (studying the genetics of floral patterning) at the California Institute of Technology.

== Career ==
In 1999 Chen started work as an assistant professor at Rutgers University's Waksman Institute of Microbiology. In 2002 she was part of a team that discovered that MicroRNA existed in plants. This work led her to win the 2005 Board of Trustees' Research Fellowship for Scholarly Excellence concurrent with a promotion to associate professor; in 2005 she moved to University of California, Riverside (UCR) and was promoted to full professor in 2009. In 2011 she was named a fellow of the American Association for the Advancement of Science for "pioneering discoveries in the field of plant biology in small RNA metabolism and plant development." That year she was also named a Plant Biology Investigator (an award of US$1,666,665) by the Howard Hughes Medical Institute and the Gordon and Betty Moore Foundation. In 2013 Chen was elected to the National Academy of Sciences: the third member from UCR's Center for Plant Cell Biology and sixth from the university's College of Natural and Agricultural Sciences.

== Publications ==
- Chen, Xuemei (August 2012). "Small RNAs in development – insights from plants". Current Opinion in Genetics & Development. 22 (4): 361–367. doi:10.1016/j.gde.2012.04.004. PMC 3419802. PMID 22578318.
