= Michael Thomashow =

American plant biologist and professor

Michael F. Thomashow (born June 22, 1949, in Hartford, Connecticut) is an American plant biologist and microbiologist at Michigan State University (MSU), where he holds the titles of University Distinguished Professor Emeritus and MSU Foundation Professor Emeritus. He is a faculty member in the MSU-DOE Plant Research Laboratory (PRL) and Department of Plant, Soil, and Microbial Sciences.

== Education ==
Thomashow earned his A.B. (1972) in bacteriology and his Ph.D. (1978) in microbiology at the University of California, Los Angeles.

== Career ==
Thomashow's research interests for the past 30 years have centered on the identification and regulation of genes in higher plants that impart tolerance to biotic and abiotic stress. His publications have been cited more than 42,000 times on Google Scholar alone.

He has served as Director of the PRL (2006-2015), Founding Director of the MSU Plant Resilience Institute (2015-2017), and President of the American Society of Plant Biologists (2004).

Thomashow is an elected member of the U.S. National Academy of Sciences and a Fellow the American Academy of Microbiology, the American Society of Plant Biologists, and the American Association for the Advancement of Science. He is a recipient of the Alexander von Humboldt Foundation Award and the Stephen Hales Prize of the American Society of Plant Biologists.

== Publications ==
See Google Scholar for a list of publications.
