= George Rédei =

Hungarian biologist

George P. Rédei (June 14, 1921 – November 10, 2008) was a Hungarian plant biologist, professor, author and member of the Hungarian Academy of Sciences.

== Biography ==
George Rédei was born June 14, 1921, in Vienna, Austria, to Kalman and Margit Rédei. He lived in Hungary, where he finished his formal education, until 1956. He and his wife, Magdolna, moved to Columbia, Missouri in 1957. He began teaching at the University of Missouri (MU) that year.

At MU, Rédei researched the genetics and biology of Arabidopsis thaliana, a small mustard plant. He was the only person in the United States to work with the plant for about 20 years, having begun working with Arabidopsis in 1957 using seeds he had brought with him from Europe. As of 2008, about 16,000 laboratories worldwide were pursuing research with Arabidopsis using his methods. Rédei used radiation to create mutant collections that were instrumental in the first Arabidopsis genetic experiments. The importance of Arabidopsis as a model system for plant genetics was not immediately appreciated; Rédei recalled that in 1969, "the NSF program director informed me I had to quit Arabidopsis if I wanted to continue to get support". Rédei's efforts later attracted the attention of Maarten Koornneef, who began studying Arabidopsis while at the Wageningen Agricultural University in the Netherlands in 1976. Koornneef ultimately constructed a detailed genetic map, further facilitating Arabidopsis genetic research. In an article in Science published in 2000 when the Arabidopsis genome sequence was first reported, Robert Pruitt (molecular geneticist at Purdue University in West Lafayette, Indiana) stated "[Rédei and Koornneef] were the guys that kept the torch burning [for Arabidopsis] during the dark ages."

Rédei conducted his research in a Curtis Hall office, which had been designed and occupied by Barbara McClintock, who won the Nobel Prize in Physiology or Medicine in 1983.

Rédei published approximately 250 papers, notes, letters, book chapters and books. His work appeared in journals including Science, Nature, Proceedings of the National Academy of Sciences of the United States of America, the EMBO Journal, Genes and Development, Molecular and General Genetics, Biochemical Genetics, and Annual Review of Genetics.

Rédei remained at MU until he retired in 1991, but continued teaching as a professor emeritus. He was a visiting professor at the Max-Planck-Institut in Cologne, Germany, and he taught for four years at the Eötvös Loránd University of Basic Sciences in Budapest, Hungary. Rédei was also a member of the Hungarian Academy of Sciences.

After he retired, Rédei continued to publish. His works include the Encyclopedic Dictionary of Genetics, Genomics and Proteomics, a Genetics Manual and a two-volume body of work titled the Encyclopedia of Genetics, Genomics, Proteomics, and Informatics.

In 2004, MU dedicated the Plant Growth Facilities section of the Christopher S. Bond Life Sciences Center to Rédei.

Rédei died on November 10, 2008, in Nashville, Tennessee at the age of 87. He had one daughter, Mari Rédei Tenkhoff, and three granddaughters.

== See also ==
- History of research on Arabidopsis thaliana
