= Said Ghabrial =

Egyptian-American plant pathologist

- Ghabrial in 2012
- Born: October 1, 1939; Cairo, Egypt
- Died: November 26, 2018 (aged 79); Kentucky, USA
- Education: Cairo University, Louisiana State University
- Spouse: Karlin Upton Ghabrial
- Children: 2
- Scientific career
- Fields: Plant pathology

Said Amin (Gabe) Ghabrial (October 1, 1939 – November 26, 2018) was an Egyptian-American plant pathologist, known for his work on mycoviruses – viruses of fungi – and particularly their effects on the virulence of plant-pathogenic fungi. He also researched bean pod mottle virus, an economically important soybean disease. He was professor of plant pathology at the University of Kentucky (1986–2014).

== Early life and education ==
Ghabrial was born in Cairo, where he attended public schools and then the College of Agriculture at Cairo University, gaining a BS in agriculture (1959). He worked at the Egyptian Ministry of Land Reform (1959–61) and then briefly did national service in the Egyptian Army. In 1961, he went to the United States on a government scholarship, and studied in the Plant Pathology Department of Louisiana State University, where he gained an MS (1963) and PhD (1965) in plant pathology, supervised by Thomas Pirone. His MS research was on tomato leaf mold, a fungal disease of tomatoes caused by Cladosporium fulvum (Passalora fulva). His PhD research was on wilting of Tabasco pepper (Capsicum frutescens) caused by tobacco etch virus.

== Career and research ==
Ghabrial carried out post-doctoral research at the University of California, Davis, on Southern bean mosaic virus under Robert Shepherd and Raymond Grogan (1965–66). After returning to Egypt, where he worked for the Ministry of Agriculture on economically important plant viruses (1966–70), he moved to the United States and took up a post-doctoral position in the Botany and Plant Pathology Department of Purdue University (1970–72) under Richard M. Lister; he worked on the segmented plant viruses tobacco rattle virus and tobacco streak virus.

In 1972, Ghabrial moved to the University of Kentucky, where he remained until his retirement, holding successively assistant (1972–75), associate (1975–86) and full professorships (1986–2014) in the Plant Pathology Department. He also held visiting professorships at the University of California, Davis (1978–79), Oregon State University (1988–89) and the University of California, Berkeley (2000–01).

One major focus of his research at Kentucky was on mycoviruses that infect fungal pathogens of plants. He discovered and characterized a virus in the Totiviridae family that infects the fungal pathogen Helminthosporium victoriae, which causes the economically important disease Victoria blight in oats. Most fungal viruses do not affect their host but Ghabrial showed that the virus attenuates the virulence of the fungus. This raises the possibility that such viruses might in future be used in the biological control of plant diseases caused by fungi. Another long-term research focus was viral diseases of soybean (Glycine max), particularly the economically important bean pod mottle virus.

He was elected a fellow of the American Phytopathological Society in 2002. He twice chaired the International Committee on Taxonomy of Viruses's fungal virus subcommittee (1987–93 and 2011–14) and was one of the editors of the sixth edition (1995) of its Virus Taxonomy report. He authored or co-authored around 150 articles in peer-reviewed journals as well as many book chapters.

== Personal life ==
Ghabrial married Karlin Upton Ghabrial, whom he met in Davis, in 1966. They had a son and two daughters. He died on November 26, 2018.

== Selected publications ==
Books

- Said A. Ghabrial (ed.) Mycoviruses (Advances in Virus Research 86) (Academic Press; 2013) (ISBN 9780123946058)
- Frederick A. Murphy, Claude M. Fauquet, David H. L. Bishop, Said A. Ghabrial, Audrey W. Jarvis, Giovanni P. Martelli, Mike A. Mayo, Max D. Summers (eds) Virus Taxonomy (Springer-Verlag; 1995)

Reviews

- Said A.Ghabrial; José R.Castón; Daohong Jiang; Max L. Nibert; Nobuhiro Suzuki (2015), "50-plus years of fungal viruses", Virology, 479–480: 356–68, doi:10.1016/j.virol.2015.02.034, PMID 25771805
- Said A. Ghabrial; Nobuhiro Suzuki (2009), "Viruses of plant pathogenic fungi", Annual Review of Phytopathology, 47 (1): 353–84, Bibcode:2009AnRvP..47..353G, doi:10.1146/annurev-phyto-080508-081932, PMID 19400634
- Said A. Ghabrial (1998), "Origin, Adaptation and Evolutionary Pathways of Fungal Viruses", Virus Genes, 16 (1): 119–31, doi:10.1023/A:1007966229595, PMC 7089520, PMID 9562896

Research articles

- Xiao Yu; Bo Li; Yanping Fu; Daohong Jiang; Said A. Ghabrial; et al. (2010), "A geminivirus-related DNA mycovirus that confers hypovirulence to a plant pathogenic fungus", Proceedings of the National Academy of Sciences USA, 107 (18): 8387–92, Bibcode:2010PNAS..107.8387Y, doi:10.1073/pnas.0913535107, PMC 2889581, PMID 20404139
- Chunquan Zhang; Said A.Ghabrial (2006), "Development of Bean pod mottle virus-based vectors for stable protein expression and sequence-specific virus-induced gene silencing in soybean", Virology, 344 (2): 401–11, doi:10.1016/j.virol.2005.08.046, PMID 16226780
- Rong Di; Virginia Purcell; Glenn B. Collins; Said A. Ghabrial (1996), "Production of transgenic soybean lines expressing the bean pod mottle virus coat protein precursor gene", Plant Cell Reports, 15 (10): 746–50, Bibcode:1996PCelR..15..746D, doi:10.1007/BF00232220, PMID 24178163, S2CID 42519926
