= Gwyn A. Beattie =

Plant pathologist

- Education: Carleton College, University of Wisconsin–Madison
- Occupations: Phytopathologist, university teacher
- Employer: Iowa State University
- Awards: Fellow of the American Phytopathological Society (2020)

Gwyn A. Beattie is the Robert Earle Buchanan Distinguished Professor of Bacteriology for Research and Nomenclature at Iowa State University, working in the areas of plant pathology and microbiology. Beattie uses molecular and cellular perspectives to examine questions about the ecology of plant bacteria such as the ways in which plant leaves respond to environmental cues, and the genomics underlying microbial responses on and within plant leaves. Her work on the microbiome and the positive influence of microbes has implications for plant health and productivity, with the potential to improve crop yields and counter food insecurity.

Beattie has chaired the American Phytopathological Society's Public Policy Board. She helped to develop the term phytobiome and publish Phytobiomes: A Roadmap for Research and Translation (2016). She has served on the Board of Directors of the International Alliance for Phytobiomes Research. Beattie has served as a Senior Editor for Molecular Plant-Microbe Interactions and became a co-editor of the Annual Review of Phytopathology as of 2022.

== Early life and education ==
One of three daughters of Alan Gilbert Beattie and his wife Barbara (Stover) Beattie, Gwyn Beattie grew up in New Mexico. Her father worked at Sandia National Laboratories.

Gwyn Beattie received a B.A. in chemistry from Carleton College (1985). She earned a Ph.D. in, cellular and molecular biology from the University of Wisconsin-Madison (1991), working with advisor Jo Handelsman on rhizobium nodulation competitiveness.

== Career ==
Beattie did post-doctoral research in microbial ecology at the University of California-Berkeley with Steven Lindow. In 1995, she joined the faculty at Iowa State University where she is currently the Robert Earle Buchanan Distinguished Professor of Bacteriology for Research and Nomenclature. In 2020, she served as Interim Chair of the Department of Plant Pathology and Microbiology at Iowa State.

Beattie participated in the American Academy of Microbiology's colloquium How Microbes Can Help Feed the World, published as proceedings in 2012. As a leader of the Phytobiomes steering committee and the Phytobiomes Roadmap Writing Workshop held at the Samuel Roberts Noble Foundation in 2015, she helped to develop the term phytobiome, and to publish Phytobiomes: A Roadmap for Research and Translation (2016).

Beattie has served two terms as the Chair of the American Phytopathological Society's Public Policy Board beginning in 2014, with her second term ending as of August 2020. She has served on the Board of Directors of the International Alliance for Phytobiomes Research (Phytobiomes Alliance), beginning with its formation in 2016.

Beattie is a strong advocate for increasing Congressional funding of scientific research in agriculture. She emphasizes the importance of developing plants that can better endure worsening growing conditions such as drought that are resulting from climate change. Such research is essential to combating food insecurity. While broadly applicable, it is likely to be of particular important for the least developed countries.

Beattie is on the editorial board of Applied and Environmental Microbiology and has served as a Senior Editor for Molecular Plant-Microbe Interactions. In 2022, she became co-editor of the Annual Review of Phytopathology with John M. McDowell.

== Research ==
Beattie is internationally recognized for her work on the ecology of phytopathogenic bacteria and their use of environmental signaling. She has explored the ways in which plant leaves respond to environmental cues, and the genomics underlying microbial responses on and within plant leaves. Using the model organism Pseudomonas syringae, she has studied bacterial perception of leaf surfaces and interiors. P. syringae bacteria can be carried long distances by air currents, and live on leafy plants in a wide variety of environments and conditions.

As she studied bacterial gene expression in different environments, she discovered that bacteria, like plants, contained light-sensing proteins. By examining the transcriptome of P. syringae, her team has determined that one-third of its genes are affected by light. Her work has identified light, and in particular far-red wavelengths, as potentially important environmental signals in plant-colonizing microbes. The discovery that bacteria have signaling pathways for different wavelengths of light has illuminated an unexpected parallel between bacteria and plants.

Beattie's research group has also discovered physiological mechanisms regulating the availability of water, that involve both host and pathogen. Water availability is a limiting factor for microbial growth. Using biosensors that they developed to assess the water status of individual cells, Beattie's group has shown that bacteria can experience low water availability deep within a plant, and that plants can limit water availability as a defensive response against bacteria. The researchers have identified microbiome signatures that are characteristic of drought-stressed plants and the root microbiomes of many plant species.

In addition, light-sensitive proteins affect gene expression in ways that help bacteria to survive periods of low water availability. Using P. syringae to examine the interactions of light with photosensory proteins, Beattie's research group discovered that bacteria were not only responding to changes in evaporation of morning dew on the leaves, they were anticipating them. By sensing light cues, bacteria were able to activate self-protective changes before warming of the leaves and evaporation of moisture occurred. This experimental work is among the first to clearly demonstrate that bacteria have developed anticipatory strategies to improve their survival.

Beattie's group has developed a model organism with genetic tractability (the potential for genetic manipulation using genetic engineering), for bacterial wilt which is caused by Erwinia tracheiphila in Cucurbitaceae (gourds). By understanding bacterial wilt etiology, the researchers hope to develop ecologically based biocontrol management strategies for crops in the Midwest and Northeast U.S.

== Awards and honors ==
- 2018, Regents Award for Faculty Excellence, Iowa State University
- 2020, APS Fellow, American Phytopathological Society

== Selected publications ==
- Beattie, Gwyn A; Lindow, Steven E (September 1995). "The Secret Life of Foliar Bacterial Pathogens on Leaves". Annual Review of Phytopathology. 33 (1): 145–172. doi:10.1146/annurev.py.33.090195.001045. ISSN 0066-4286. PMID 18294082.
- Beattie, GA; Lindow, SE (May 1999). "Bacterial colonization of leaves: a spectrum of strategies". Phytopathology. 89 (5): 353–9. doi:10.1094/PHYTO.1999.89.5.353. PMID 18944746.
- Grant, Sarah R.; Fisher, Emily J.; Chang, Jeff H.; Mole, Beth M.; Dangl, Jeffery L. (1 October 2006). "Subterfuge and Manipulation: Type III Effector Proteins of Phytopathogenic Bacteria". Annual Review of Microbiology. 60 (1): 425–449. doi:10.1146/annurev.micro.60.080805.142251. ISSN 0066-4227. PMID 16753033.
- Freeman, B.C.; Beattie, G.A. (2008). "An Overview of Plant Defenses against Pathogens and Herbivores". The Plant Health Instructor. doi:10.1094/PHI-I-2008-0226-01.
- Beattie, Gwyn A. (8 September 2011). "Water Relations in the Interaction of Foliar Bacterial Pathogens with Plants". Annual Review of Phytopathology. 49 (1): 533–555. doi:10.1146/annurev-phyto-073009-114436. ISSN 0066-4286. PMID 21438680.
- Yu, X; Lund, SP; Scott, RA; Greenwald, JW; Records, AH; Nettleton, D; Lindow, SE; Gross, DC; Beattie, GA (29 January 2013). "Transcriptional responses of Pseudomonas syringae to growth in epiphytic versus apoplastic leaf sites". Proceedings of the National Academy of Sciences of the United States of America. 110 (5): E425-34. doi:10.1073/pnas.1221892110. PMC 3562829. PMID 23319638.
- Liu, Q.; Beattie, Gwyn A.; Rojas, E. Saalau; Gleason, Mark L. (2018). "Bacterial wilt symptoms are impacted by host age and involve net downward movement of Erwinia tracheiphila in muskmelon" (PDF). European Journal of Plant Pathology. 151 (3): 803–810. Bibcode:2018EJPP..151..803L. doi:10.1007/s10658-018-1418-7. S2CID 254468634.
- Beattie, Gwyn A.; Hatfield, Bridget M.; Dong, Haili; McGrane, Regina S. (25 August 2018). "Seeing the Light: The Roles of Red- and Blue-Light Sensing in Plant Microbes". Annual Review of Phytopathology. 56 (1): 41–66. doi:10.1146/annurev-phyto-080417-045931. ISSN 0066-4286. PMID 29768135.
- Etesami, H; Beattie, GA (2018). "Mining Halophytes for Plant Growth-Promoting Halotolerant Bacteria to Enhance the Salinity Tolerance of Non-halophytic Crops". Frontiers in Microbiology. 9: 148. doi:10.3389/fmicb.2018.00148. PMC 5809494. PMID 29472908.
- Hatfield, Bridget M.; LaSarre, Breah; Liu, Meiling; Dong, Haili; Nettleton, Dan; Beattie, Gwyn A. (19 September 2023). "Light cues induce protective anticipation of environmental water loss in terrestrial bacteria". Proceedings of the National Academy of Sciences. 120 (38) e2309632120. Bibcode:2023PNAS..12009632H. doi:10.1073/pnas.2309632120. ISSN 0027-8424. PMC 10515139. PMID 37695906.
