= Sanjaya Rajaram =

Indian-born Mexican scientist (1943–2021)

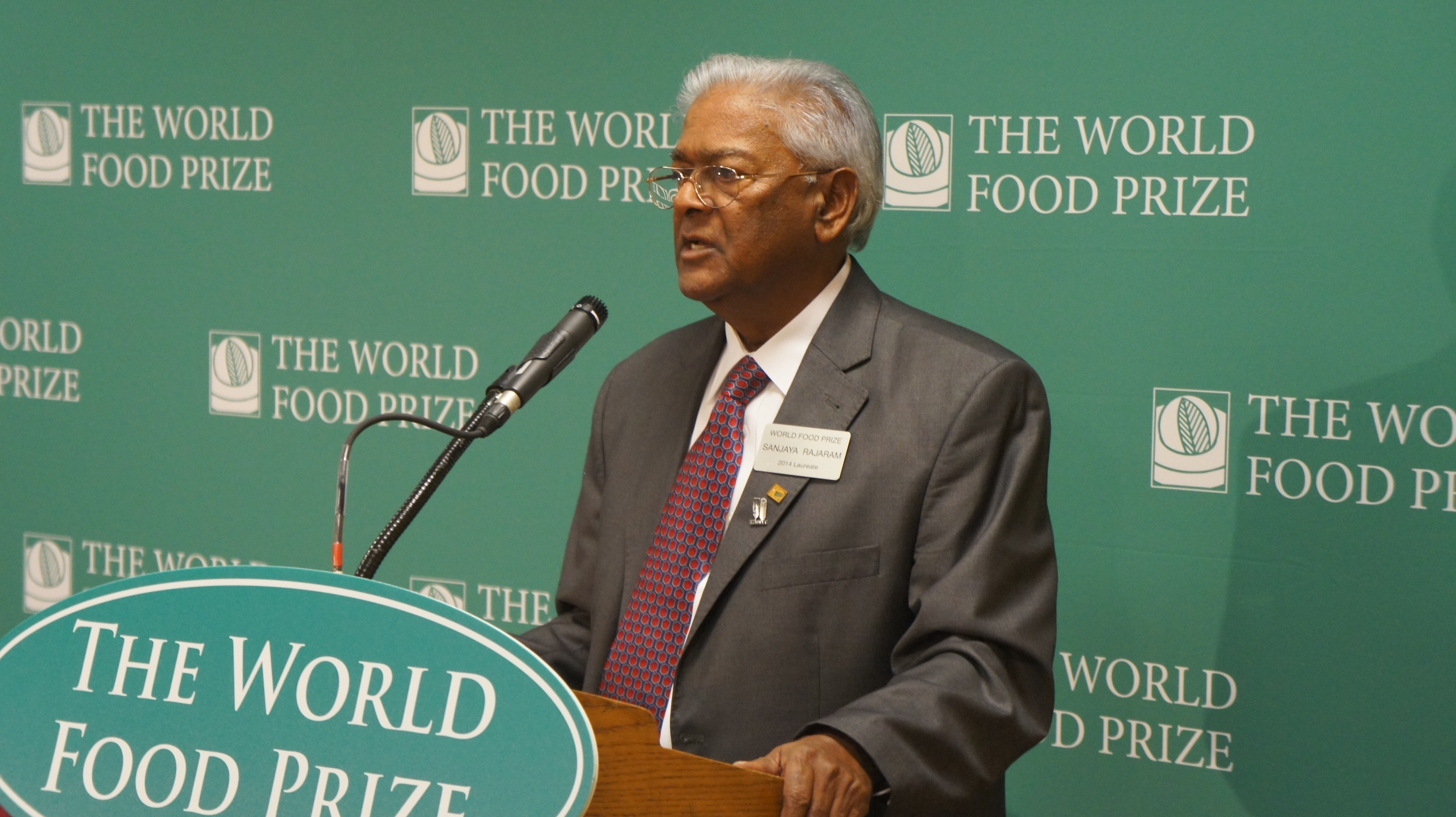
- Born: 1943; Varanasi District, United Provinces, British India now Uttar Pradesh, India
- Died: 17 February 2021 (aged 77–78); Ciudad Obregón, Sonora, Mexico
- Education: University of Gorakhpur; Indian Agricultural Research Institute (IARI); University of Sydney
- Known for: Developing 480 types of wheat
- Awards: World Food Prize (2014); Padma Bhushan (posthumous, 2022)
- Scientific career
- Fields: Agronomy
- Workplaces: International Maize and Wheat Improvement Center (CIMMYT)
- Doctoral advisor: Dr. Irvine Watson

Dr. Sanjaya Rajaram (1943 – 17 February 2021) was an Indian-born Mexican scientist and winner of the 2014 World Food Prize. He was awarded this prize for his scientific research in developing 480 wheat varieties that have been released in 51 countries. This innovation has led to an increase in world wheat production – by more than 200 million tons – building upon the successes of the Green Revolution. The Government of India awarded him India's fourth- and third-highest civilian awards Padma Shri (2001) and Padma Bhushan (2022).

== Early life, education and family ==
Sanjaya Rajaram was born in 1943 near a small farming village Raipur, District Varanasi in the state of Uttar Pradesh in northern India. His family, including his parents, an older brother and a younger sister, made a meagre living on their five-hectare farm growing wheat, rice and maize. Unlike most children in his socioeconomic position, he was encouraged to pursue an education by his parents, and graduated from secondary school as the top-ranked student in the entire Varanasi District.

Rajaram went on to earn a B.Sc. in agriculture from the University of Gorakhpur, a M.Sc. in genetics and plant breeding from the Indian Agricultural Research Institute (IARI) in New Delhi and a Ph.D. in plant breeding from the University of Sydney. While at the IARI in 1964, he studied genetics and plant breeding under Prof. M.S. Swaminathan.

== Career ==
In 1969, Rajaram began working in Mexico as a wheat breeder at the International Maize and Wheat Improvement Center (CIMMYT). He was recruited by and worked alongside scientists Norman Borlaug and his deputy Canadian Glenn Anderson, in experimental wheat fields in El Batan (Texcoco), and in the Mexican cities of Toluca and Ciudad Obregon, Sonora. In 1972, he became the director of CIMMYT at the age of 29.

After 33 years at CIMMYT, including seven as Director of the Global Wheat Program, Rajaram joined the International Center for Agricultural Research in the Dry Areas (ICARDA) as Director of Integrated Gene Management before formally retiring in 2008. During his distinguished career, Rajaram's work resulted in the release of more than 480 varieties of bread wheat in 51 countries, which are grown on more than 58 million hectares worldwide.

Rajaram, an elected Fellow of the National Academy of Agricultural Sciences, was also the owner and director of Resource Seed Mexicana, a small private company specializing in wheat development and promotion.

Rajaram died from COVID-19 on 17 February 2021, in Ciudad Obregon, Mexico.

== Awards and recognition ==
In 2022, Sanjay Rajaram received Padma Bhushan from Government of India; the award is the third-highest award that a civilian can receive.

== Authored works ==
- Das, Modan K.; Rajaram, Sanjaya; Mundt, Christopher C.; Kronstad, Warren E. (1992). "Inheritance of slow-rusting resistance to leaf rust in wheat". Crop Science. 32 (6): 1452–1456. doi:10.2135/cropsci1992.0011183X003200060028x.
- Singh, Ravi P.; Rajaram, Sanjaya (1 February 1992). "Genetics of adult-plant resistance of leaf rust in 'Frontana' and three CIMMYT wheats". Genome. 35 (1). Canadian Society for Molecular Biosciences (NRC): 24–31. doi:10.1139/g92-004. ISSN 0831-2796. S2CID 83584974.
- Singh, Ravi P.; Ma, Hong; Rajaram, Sanjaya (1995). "Genetic Analysis of Resistance to Scab in Spring Wheat Cultivar Frontana". Plant Disease. 79 (3). American Phytopathological Society: 238. doi:10.1094/pd-79-0238. ISSN 0191-2917. S2CID 84607766.
- Singh, Ravi P.; Huerta-Espino, Julio; Rajaram, Sanjaya (28 August – 1 September 2000). Barna, B.; Kiraly, Z. (eds.). Achieving near-immunity to leaf and stripe rusts in wheat by combining slow rusting resistance genes. Tenth Cereal Rusts and Powdery Mildews Conference. Acta Phytopathologica et Entomologica Hungarica. Vol. 35, no. 1/4. Budapest, Hungary. pp. 133–139. S2CID 85811712. 10 refs. CABD 20001009163.
- Rajaram, Sanjaya (8 September 2011). "Norman Borlaug: The Man I Worked With and Knew". Annual Review of Phytopathology. 49 (1). Annual Reviews: 17–30. doi:10.1146/annurev-phyto-072910-095308. ISSN 0066-4286. PMID 21370972. S2CID 34962814.

- Cited at Norman Borlaug
