= Watermelon mosaic virus =

- Ring spots on watermelon caused by Watermelon mosaic virus

Virus classification
- (unranked): Virus
- Realm: Riboviria
- Kingdom: Orthornavirae
- Phylum: Pisuviricota
- Class: Stelpaviricetes
- Order: Patatavirales
- Family: Potyviridae
- Genus: Potyvirus
- Species: Potyvirus citrulli

Species of virus

Watermelon mosaic virus (WMV, Potyvirus citrulli), also known as Marrow mosaic virus, Melon mosaic virus, and Watermelon mosaic virus type 2 (WMV-2), is a pathogenic virus that causes viral infection in a wide range of plants. It is a positive-sense single-stranded RNA virus that is part of the Potyviridae family (potyviruses) and contains a protein capsid which protects the inner viral RNA. First described on squash in Florida, Watermelon mosaic virus arose from a unique recombination of genetic material contributed by Soybean mosaic virus (SMV) and Bean common mosaic virus (BCMV) along with Peanut stripe virus (PSV).

== Biology ==
Watermelon mosaic virus is a potyvirus whose particles are 760 nm long flexuous rods which has a single strand of RNA. This particular genome structure closely relates WMV to other crop viruses such as Zucchini yellow mosaic virus (ZYMV) and Papaya ringspot virus (PRSV). In its hosts, WMV induces cylindrical inclusions in the cytoplasm which damages the host's tissue. This virus is primarily transmitted non-persistently by many species of aphids, and can take most members of the Cucurbitacea family and many leguminous species as hosts. The virus is more common in temperate regions, as well as in the tropics, though it has been reported in most countries where cucurbits are grown. Watermelon mosaic virus has been the cause of severe economic losses to crop yields of cucurbitaceous, leguminous, malvaceous and chenopodiaceous plants in temperate and Mediterranean regions.

== Host range and symptoms ==
Watermelon mosaic virus is best known for causing disease in most cucurbits and some legumes, though experimentally it has been shown to have a broader host range than almost all other potyviruses. This host range includes more than 170 different plant species from 27 different families.

The symptoms of infection can vary depending on the species of the host, the cultivar, environmental factors and strains of the virus, but the main symptoms to look for are mottling and mosaic. For example, WMV causes systemic mosaic and occasional leaf malformation in Cucurbita pepo, a type of squash, while causing necrotic local lesions, systemic mottling, and necrosis when infecting Pisum sativum or mosaic lesions and fruit distortion in Citrullus lanatus. Some of the more common symptoms are chlorotic rings, leaf rugosity and green mosaic. Watermelon mosaic virus induces mosaic on Nicotiana benthamiana and chlorotic local lesions on Chenopodium amaranticolor, two of its diagnostic plant species. Sometimes, the virus can be recognized by the intensity of symptoms caused in susceptible hosts.

== Transmission and control ==
Watermelon mosaic virus can be transmitted in multiple ways including vector transmission or physical interactions of a person or tool, but the primary means of transmission is through aphids. At least 29 species of aphid, including Aphis gossypii and Aphis craccivora, are known to have the ability to vector the virus. Aphids pick up the plant virus during probing and transmit it non-persistently to other hosts for a period of time up to a few hours after contact. Because the transmission is non-persistent, pesticides do not provide effective control of the virus unless used as a preventative measure to reduce aphid populations. After the virus is found in fields, aphids could potentially spread it to new hosts before the pesticides eliminate the aphids.

Besides the preventative use of insecticides, the application of mineral oil sprays has been shown to interfere with virus transmission and can be an effective control. Cultural practices such as crop rotation have also been found to be fairly effective methods of avoidance.

== Pathogen identification methods ==
Many crop viruses cause similar visual symptoms. Therefore, there is no accurate way to accurately diagnose crop viruses through visual signs alone. ELISA-based assays can be used to positively identify the presence of Watermelon mosaic virus. Specific primers have also been designed for molecular WMV detection by RT-PCR.

== Bibliography ==
- Iwaki, M.; Honda, Y.; Hanada, K.; Tochihara, H.; Yonaha, T.; Hokama, K.; Yokoyama, T (1984). "Silver Mottle Disease of Watermelon Caused by Tomato Spotted Wilt Virus" (PDF). Plant Disease. 68: 1006–1008.
- Raychaudhuri, M.; Varma, A. (1975). "Virus-vector relationship of marrow mosaic virus with Myzus persicae Sulz". Indian Journal of Entomology. 37 (3). New Delhi: Indian Agricultural Research Institute: 247–250. ISSN 0367-8288.
- Zitter, Thomas A.; Hopkins, Donald L.; Thomas, Claude E., eds. (1996). Compendium of Cucurbit Diseases. St. Paul, MN: American Phytopathological Society. ISBN 978-0-89054-207-1.
