= Max D. Summers =

American molecular biologist

Max Duane Summers (born 1939 in Ohio) is an American molecular biologist and inventor, known for his work on the Baculovirus Expression Vector System (BEVS).

== Education and career ==
Summers graduated in 1962 from Wilmington College with an A.B. in biology. In 1968 he received a PhD in entomology from Purdue University. In the department of botany of the University of Texas he became an assistant professor and then an associate professor. In the department of entomology of Texas A&M University he became in 1977 a full professor, retiring as professor emeritus in 2011.

Gale E. Smith received in 1986 his Ph.D. in molecular biology with Summers as thesis advisor. In 1988 Smith and Summers were granted the key BEVS patent, U.S. Patent No. 4,745,051: "Method for Producing a Recombinant baculovirus Expression Vector", with assignee the Texas A&M University System.

Summers and co-workers demonstrated that mutations of integral membrane proteins expressed within the inner nuclear membrane of the nuclear envelope can cause diseases associated with muscular dystrophies and lipodystrophies. Their research was an important contribution to knowledge of protein targeting with many possible applications to medicine and agricultural pest control.

Summers is the author or co-author of more than 170 articles in academic journals. In 2001 the Institute for Scientific Information (ISI) listed him among the 250 most cited microbiologists in the world. He was an editorial board member of Virology and the executive editor of Protein Expression and Purification.

== Awards and honors ==
- 1989 — Member of the National Academy of Sciences
- 1989 — Fellow of the American Association for the Advancement of Science
- 1991–1992 — President of the American Society for Virology
- 1992 — Distinguished Alumni Award from the Purdue University School of Agriculture
- 1999 — Gulf Coast Inventor of the Year Award from the Houston Intellectual Property Lawyers' Association
- 2009 — 'Father of Baculovirus Expression Technology' Award from Williamsburg Bioprocessing Foundation (WilBio)

== Selected publications ==
=== Articles ===
- Smith, Gale E.; Summers, Max D. (1978). "Analysis of baculovirus genomes with restriction endonucleases". Virology. 89 (2): 517–527. doi:10.1016/0042-6822(78)90193-9. PMID 18627885.
- Smith, Gale E.; Summers, Max D. (1980). "The bidirectional transfer of DNA and RNA to nitrocellulose or diazobenzyloxymethyl-paper". Analytical Biochemistry. 109 (1): 123–129. doi:10.1016/0003-2697(80)90019-6. PMID 6162401.
- Edson, K.; Vinson, S.; Stoltz, D.; Summers, M. (1981). "Virus in a parasitoid wasp: Suppression of the cellular immune response in the parasitoid's host". Science. 211 (4482): 582–583. Bibcode:1981Sci...211..582E. doi:10.1126/science.7455695. PMID 7455695.
- Smith, G. E.; Summers, M. D.; Fraser, M. J. (1983). "Production of human beta interferon in insect cells infected with a baculovirus expression vector". Molecular and Cellular Biology. 3 (12): 2156–2165. doi:10.1128/MCB.3.12.2156. PMC 370086. PMID 6318086.
- Smith, G. E.; Ju, G.; Ericson, B. L.; Moschera, J.; Lahm, H. W.; Chizzonite, R.; Summers, M. D. (1985). "Modification and secretion of human interleukin 2 produced in insect cells by a baculovirus expression vector". Proceedings of the National Academy of Sciences. 82 (24): 8404–8408. Bibcode:1985PNAS...82.8404S. doi:10.1073/pnas.82.24.8404. PMC 390924. PMID 3878519.
- Luckow, Verne A.; Summers, Max D. (1988). "Trends in the Development of Baculovirus Expression Vectors". Nature Biotechnology. 6: 47–55. doi:10.1038/nbt0188-47. S2CID 33787236.
- Webb, N. R.; Madoulet, C.; Tosi, P. F.; Broussard, D. R.; Sneed, L.; Nicolau, C.; Summers, M. D. (1989). "Cell-surface expression and purification of human CD4 produced in baculovirus-infected insect cells". Proceedings of the National Academy of Sciences. 86 (20): 7731–7735. Bibcode:1989PNAS...86.7731W. doi:10.1073/pnas.86.20.7731. PMC 298144. PMID 2682621.
- Webb, B. A.; Summers, M. D. (1990). "Venom and viral expression products of the endoparasitic wasp Campoletis sonorensis share epitopes and related sequences". Proceedings of the National Academy of Sciences of the United States of America. 87 (13): 4961–5. Bibcode:1990PNAS...87.4961W. doi:10.1073/pnas.87.13.4961. PMC 54241. PMID 1695005.
- Fleming, J. G.; Summers, M. D. (1991). "Polydnavirus DNA is integrated in the DNA of its parasitoid wasp host". Proceedings of the National Academy of Sciences. 88 (21): 9770–9774. Bibcode:1991PNAS...88.9770F. doi:10.1073/pnas.88.21.9770. PMC 52802. PMID 1946402.
- Summers, M. D.; Dib-Hajj, S. D. (1995). "Polydnavirus-facilitated endoparasite protection against host immune defenses". Proceedings of the National Academy of Sciences. 92 (1): 29–36. Bibcode:1995PNAS...92...29S. doi:10.1073/pnas.92.1.29. PMC 42812. PMID 7816835.
- Hong, T.; Summers, M. D.; Braunagel, S. C. (1997). "N-terminal sequences from Autographa californica nuclear polyhedrosis virus envelope proteins ODV-E66 and ODV-E25 are sufficient to direct reporter proteins to the nuclear envelope, intranuclear microvesicles and the envelope of occlusion derived virus". Proceedings of the National Academy of Sciences. 94 (8): 4050–4055. Bibcode:1997PNAS...94.4050H. doi:10.1073/pnas.94.8.4050. PMC 20566. PMID 9108103.
- Belyavskyi, M.; Braunagel, S. C.; Summers, M. D. (1998). "The structural protein ODV-EC27 of Autographa californica nucleopolyhedrovirus is a multifunctional viral cyclin". Proceedings of the National Academy of Sciences. 95 (19): 11205–11210. Bibcode:1998PNAS...9511205B. doi:10.1073/pnas.95.19.11205. ISSN 0027-8424. PMC 21620. PMID 9736714.
- Braunagel, S. C.; Russell, W. K.; Rosas-Acosta, G.; Russell, D. H.; Summers, M. D. (2003). "Determination of the protein composition of the occlusion-derived virus of Autographa californica nucleopolyhedrovirus". Proceedings of the National Academy of Sciences. 100 (17): 9797–9802. Bibcode:2003PNAS..100.9797B. doi:10.1073/pnas.1733972100. PMC 187845. PMID 12904572. S2CID 42181427.
- Braunagel, S. C.; Williamson, S. T.; Saksena, S.; Zhong, Z.; Russell, W. K.; Russell, D. H.; Summers, M. D. (2004). "Trafficking of ODV-E66 is mediated via a sorting motif and other viral proteins: Facilitated trafficking to the inner nuclear membrane". Proceedings of the National Academy of Sciences. 101 (22): 8372–8377. Bibcode:2004PNAS..101.8372B. doi:10.1073/pnas.0402727101. PMC 420401. PMID 15150405.
- Saksena, S.; Shao, Y.; Braunagel, S. C.; Summers, M. D.; Johnson, A. E. (2004). "Cotranslational integration and initial sorting at the endoplasmic reticulum translocon of proteins destined for the inner nuclear membrane". Proceedings of the National Academy of Sciences. 101 (34): 12537–12542. Bibcode:2004PNAS..10112537S. doi:10.1073/pnas.0404934101. PMC 515093. PMID 15306686.
- Summers, M. D. (2006). "Milestones leading to the genetic engineering of baculoviruses as expression vector systems and viral pesticides". Advances in Virus Research. 68: 3–73. doi:10.1016/S0065-3527(06)68001-9. ISBN 9780120398683. PMID 16997008.
- Braunagel, S. C.; Williamson, S. T.; Ding, Q.; Wu, X.; Summers, M. D. (2007). "Early sorting of inner nuclear membrane proteins is conserved". Proceedings of the National Academy of Sciences. 104 (22): 9307–9312. Bibcode:2007PNAS..104.9307B. doi:10.1073/pnas.0703186104. PMC 1874229. PMID 17517639.

=== Pamphlets ===
- Summers, M. D.; Smith, G. E. (1987). A manual of methods for baculovirus vectors and insect cell culture procedures. Vol. 1555. Texas Agricultural Experiment Station.

=== Books ===
- Murphy, F.A.; Fauquet, C.M.; Bishop, D.H.; Ghabrial, S.A.; Jarvis, A.W.; Martelli, G.P.; Mayo, M.A.; Summers, M.D., eds. (2012). Virus taxonomy: classification and nomenclature of viruses. Sixth Report of the International Committee on Taxonomy of Viruses, Virology Division, International Union of Microbiological Societies. Vol. 10. Springer Science & Business Media. ISBN 978-3-7091-6607-9; 586 pages; pbk edition of 1995 original
