= Raymond G. Grogan =

American researcher of plant pathogens

- Born: July 22, 1920; Dawson County, Georgia
- Died: July 30, 2016 (aged 96); Santa Cruz, California
- Education: University of North Georgia; University of Georgia; University of Wisconsin–Madison
- Partner: Patricia Viola Smith
- Children: 4
- Scientific career
- Institutions: University of California, Davis
- Thesis: A study of several virus diseases of the bean (Phaseolus vulgaris L.) (1948)
- Doctoral advisor: John Charles Walker

Raymond Gerald Grogan (July 22, 1920 – July 30, 2016) was an American phytopathologist (plant disease researcher). During his career at the University of California, Davis, he primarily researched diseases that affected crops like lettuce, tomatoes, and beans. He was the editor of the Annual Review of Phytopathology from 1978–1984.

== Early life and education ==
Raymond Gerald Grogan was born on July 22, 1920, in Emma, Georgia, in Dawson County to parents Lula née Parks and Raymond Grady Grogan. Both of his parents were educators, and he eventually attended the school where his father was principal. He had a younger sister, Jane. He attended the University of North Georgia where he earned his bachelor's; he then attended the University of Georgia for his master's degree. Grogan served in the Navy during World War II and was enlisted for three years. After his military service, he enrolled at the University of Wisconsin–Madison and completed a PhD under advisor John Charles Walker, researching diseases of cultivated beans. He demonstrated that some beans were hyper-sensitive to Bean common mosaic virus, causing necrosis. He also discovered that the virus was seed-borne and transmitted from plant to plant via bean pollen. He graduated in 1948.

== Career ==
Grogan accepted a position at the University of California, Davis in 1948. In 1960, he was made a full professor. From 1969 to 1974, he was the chair of He remained at UC Davis until his retirement in 1985. Grogan researched various pathogens that affected crops. He determined that the yellowing of lettuce plants, termed "June yellows", was caused by the Lettuce mosaic virus. June yellows could be prevented by using seeds that were resistant to the virus. He also discovered the transmission route of the bacteria Pseudomonas tomato, how to prevent halo blight of beans, and the cause of corky root rot in lettuce.

He was the editor of the Annual Review of Phytopathology from 1978–1984. He also served on the editorial boards of the journals Plant Disease, Phytopathology, and Virology.

== Awards and honors ==
In 1962, he was awarded the Campbell Soup Company award for outstanding research in vegetable production jointly with Robert N. Campbell. Grogan was elected as a fellow of the American Phytopathological Society in 1969; in 1987 he received its Award of Distinction.

== Personal life and death ==
He married Patricia Viola Smith around 1944. They had four daughters; their marriage ended in 1988 with Patricia's death. Grogan died on July 30, 2016, in Santa Cruz, California, just after his 96th birthday.
