= Protein expression and purification =

Protein expression and purification may refer to:

- Protein production, the process of generating some quantity of a specific protein using living organisms
- Protein purification, the process of separating a specific protein from a mixture of proteins and other molecules
- Protein Expression and Purification (journal), a peer-reviewed scientific journal on these biotechnology topics
