= Neal K. Van Alfen =

American plant pathologist

- Citizenship: US
- Education: Brigham Young University; University of California, Davis
- Partner: Pam Kazmierczak
- Scientific career
- Institutions: Utah State University; Texas A&M University; University of California, Davis

Neal K. Van Alfen is an American plant pathologist. He was the dean of the UC Davis College of Agricultural and Environmental Sciences from 1999 to 2012 and the editor of the Annual Review of Phytopathology from 2004 to 2014.

== Early life and education ==
Neal K. Van Alfen was born to parents Marguerite née Noorda and Gerrit Van Alfen. Gerrit Van Alfen was an emigrant from the Netherlands. He grew up in Modesto, California and worked farm-related jobs in his youth, including harvesting peaches and on chicken farms. He attended Brigham Young University for his bachelor's degree in chemistry and his master's degree in botany. For his PhD he attended the University of California, Davis, majoring in plant pathology.

== Career ==
He taught at Utah State University and Texas A&M University before returning to UC Davis. He researched problems in international agricultural systems, including those of China, Taiwan, Vietnam, Thailand, Israel and Kazakhstan. He became the dean of the College of Agricultural and Environmental Sciences in 1999. He retired from his position as dean in 2012. Upon his retirement, he became a dean emeritus and professor emeritus of plant pathology.

His works include editing the Encyclopedia of Agriculture and Food Systems. He was also the editor of the Annual Review of Phytopathology from 2004–2014.

== Awards and honors ==
He is a fellow of the American Association for the Advancement of Science and the American Phytopathological Society. He is also an honorary fellow of the California Agricultural Leadership Foundation and a former president of the American Phytopathological Society.

== Personal life ==
After retiring from UC Davis, he returned to farming on his property in Winters, California in Yolo County. He grows citrus, grapes, and olives. He also serves as the vice president of the Yolo Land Trust. He is married to Pam Kazmierczak.
