= John M. McDowell =

Professor of biotechnology

- Born: April 30, 1965; Knoxville, Tennessee, U.S.
- Died: December 24, 2024 (aged 59); Blacksburg, Virginia, U.S.
- Education: University of Georgia
- Occupations: Academic, research scientist, phytopathologist
- Employers: University of North Carolina (1995–1999); Virginia Tech (2000–)

John M. McDowell (April 30, 1965 – December 24, 2024) was the J.B. Stroobants Professor of Biotechnology at Virginia Polytechnic Institute and State University. His major area of research is phytopathology and plant-pathogen interactions. He used gene-sequencing technology to examine the genome of Phytophthora capsici and to develop strains of soybean plants that are better able to defend against pathogens.

== Early life and education ==
John McDowell was born on April 30, 1965. He received his B.A. in cell and molecular biology from the University of Tennessee (1987). He received his Ph.D. in genetics, from the University of Georgia (1995).

== Career ==
McDowell was a postdoctoral fellow with Jeffery Dangl at the University of North Carolina at Chapel Hill from 1995 to 1999.

McDowell joined the Department of Plant Pathology, Physiology, and Weed Science in the College of Agriculture and Life Sciences at Virginia Polytechnic Institute and State University (Virginia Tech) in 2000. In 2017, he was named the J.B. Stroobants Professor of Biotechnology at Virginia Tech. As of 2018, he became a professor in the School of Plant and Environmental Sciences at Virginia Tech. He has served as associate scientific director at the Fralin Life Science Institute at Virginia Tech.

McDowell was a strong advocate for congressional funding of scientific research, emphasizing its importance to farmers and food production and its impact on the U.S. economy.

McDowell served on the editorial boards of multiple journals. He was editor-in-chief of Molecular Plant-Microbe Interactions (2016–2018). He joined the Annual Review of Phytopathology in 2019, and became the journal's co-lead editor with Gwyn A. Beattie from 2022-2025.

== Research ==
McDowell studied fundamental biological principles underlying plants' susceptibility to disease, and their defense mechanisms against pathogens. His work is relevant to the development of crops with the ability to resist pathogens and increase yield. For example, McDowell studied the genome of a pathogen that kills soybeans, the second most planted crop in the U.S.. and used that information to develop strains of soybean plants that are better able to defend against the pathogen. He worked with David Haak and others on the development of gene-sequencing technology and the examination of the complex genome of Phytophthora capsici. P. capsici attacks plants including soybeans, tomatoes, and lavender.

== Death ==
McDowell died on December 24, 2024, after a 19-month-long battle with cancer.

== Awards and honors ==
- 2016, Academy of Faculty Leadership, Virginia Tech

== Selected publications ==
- McDowell, J. M., ed. (2011). Plant immunity: methods and protocols. New York: Humana Press. ISBN 978-1-61737-997-0.
- An, YQ; McDowell, JM; Huang, S; McKinney, EC; Chambliss, S; Meagher, RB (July 1996). "Strong, constitutive expression of the Arabidopsis ACT2/ACT8 actin subclass in vegetative tissues". The Plant Journal. 10 (1): 107–21. Bibcode:1996PlJ....10..107A. doi:10.1046/j.1365-313x.1996.10010107.x. PMID 8758981.
- McDowell, JM; Dhandaydham, M; Long, TA; Aarts, MG; Goff, S; Holub, EB; Dangl, JL (November 1998). "Intragenic recombination and diversifying selection contribute to the evolution of downy mildew resistance at the RPP8 locus of Arabidopsis". The Plant Cell. 10 (11): 1861–74. doi:10.1105/tpc.10.11.1861. PMC 143965. PMID 9811794.
- McDowell, JM; Dangl, JL (February 2000). "Signal transduction in the plant immune response". Trends in Biochemical Sciences. 25 (2): 79–82. doi:10.1016/s0968-0004(99)01532-7. PMID 10664588.
- McDowell, JM; Woffenden, BJ (April 2003). "Plant disease resistance genes: recent insights and potential applications". Trends in Biotechnology. 21 (4): 178–83. doi:10.1016/S0167-7799(03)00053-2. PMID 12679066.
- Baxter, L; Tripathy, S; Ishaque, N; Boot, N; Cabral, A; Kemen, E; Thines, M; Ah-Fong, A; Anderson, R; Badejoko, W; Bittner-Eddy, P; Boore, JL; Chibucos, MC; Coates, M; Dehal, P; Delehaunty, K; Dong, S; Downton, P; Dumas, B; Fabro, G; Fronick, C; Fuerstenberg, SI; Fulton, L; Gaulin, E; Govers, F; Hughes, L; Humphray, S; Jiang, RHY; Judelson, H; Kamoun, S; Kyung, K; Meijer, H; Minx, P; Morris, P; Nelson, J; Phuntumart, V; Qutob, D; Rehmany, A; Rougon-Cardoso, A; Ryden, P; Torto-Alalibo, T; Studholme, D; Wang, Y; Win, J; Wood, J; Clifton, SW; Rogers, J; Van den Ackerveken, G; Jones, JDG; McDowell, JM; Beynon, J; Tyler, BM (December 10, 2010). "Signatures of adaptation to obligate biotrophy in the Hyaloperonospora arabidopsidis genome". Science. 330 (6010): 1549–1551. Bibcode:2010Sci...330.1549B. doi:10.1126/science.1195203. PMC 3971456. PMID 21148394.
- Kamoun, S; Furzer, O; Jones, JD; Judelson, HS; Ali, GS; Dalio, RJ; Roy, SG; Schena, L; Zambounis, A; Panabières, F; Cahill, D; Ruocco, M; Figueiredo, A; Chen, XR; Hulvey, J; Stam, R; Lamour, K; Gijzen, M; Tyler, BM; Grünwald, NJ; Mukhtar, MS; Tomé, DF; Tör, M; Van Den Ackerveken, G; McDowell, J; Daayf, F; Fry, WE; Lindqvist-Kreuze, H; Meijer, HJ; Petre, B; Ristaino, J; Yoshida, K; Birch, PR; Govers, F (May 2015). "The Top 10 oomycete pathogens in molecular plant pathology". Molecular Plant Pathology. 16 (4): 413–34. Bibcode:2015MolPP..16..413K. doi:10.1111/mpp.12190. PMC 6638381. PMID 25178392.
- Cui, Chenming; Herlihy, John H.; Bombarely, Aureliano; McDowell, John M.; Haak, David C. (December 2019). "Draft Assembly of Phytophthora capsici from Long-Read Sequencing Uncovers Complexity". Molecular Plant-Microbe Interactions. 32 (12): 1559–1563. Bibcode:2019MPMI...32.1559C. doi:10.1094/MPMI-04-19-0103-TA. ISSN 0894-0282. PMID 31479390.
- Herlihy, JH; Long, TA; McDowell, JM (September 25, 2020). "Iron homeostasis and plant immune responses: Recent insights and translational implications". The Journal of Biological Chemistry. 295 (39): 13444–13457. doi:10.1074/jbc.REV120.010856. PMC 7521657. PMID 32732287.
- Wilson, RA; McDowell, JM (August 2022). "Recent advances in understanding of fungal and oomycete effectors". Current Opinion in Plant Biology. 68 102228. Bibcode:2022COPB...6802228W. doi:10.1016/j.pbi.2022.102228. PMID 35605341.
- Wang, W; Liu, J; Mishra, B; Mukhtar, MS; McDowell, JM (December 2022). "Sparking a sulfur war between plants and pathogens". Trends in Plant Science. 27 (12): 1253–1265. Bibcode:2022TPS....27.1253W. doi:10.1016/j.tplants.2022.07.007. PMID 36028431.
- Bilir, Ö; Göl, D; Hong, Y; McDowell, JM; Tör, M (2022). "Small RNA-based plant protection against diseases". Frontiers in Plant Science. 13 951097. Bibcode:2022FrPS...1351097B. doi:10.3389/fpls.2022.951097. PMC 9434005. PMID 36061762.
