= Geneviève Défago =

Geneviève Défago (born 18 July 1942) is a former lecturer in phytopathology at the Institute of Plant Sciences in the discipline of phytomedicine at ETH Zurich, the Swiss Federal Institute of Technology in Zurich, Switzerland. She was the director of interuniversity and interdisciplinary projects devoted to biological control and biosafety. In 1990, she was awarded the title of Professor. She retired at the end of July 2006.

== Career ==
Défago was born on 18 July 1942 and comes from Val d-Illiez, in canton Valais (VS), Switzerland. She studied natural sciences at the University of Lausanne and at ETH Zurich, where her major field of study was physiological plant pathology. Her doctoral dissertation on the taxonomy of hyphomycetes was awarded the ETH Zurich Silver Medal in 1967. Following a postdoc period at the Prairie Regional Laboratory in Saskatoon, Canada, she returned to Zurich in 1969 as head of the scientific staff at the Institute for Special Botany. In 1977 she received the venia legendi in the Department of Natural Sciences. She teaches molecular and applied phytopathology. Her research is directed chiefly towards the mechanisms and regulation that allow beneficial bacteria to protect plant against diseases caused by soil-borne pathogenic fungi. A main emphasis is the evaluation of the risks involved in the application of transgenic organisms. Another focus is the fundamentals of the biological control of bindweeds with pathogenic fungi.

== Highlights ==
Défago was the first president of the Swiss Society for Phytomedicine. She is also a member of the American Phytopathological Society (APS), the French Society of Phytopathology, the German Society of Phytomedicine, the Swiss Botanical Society, the Swiss Microbiology Society, and the American Society for Microbiology. She is credited as being a major force in European and international plant pathology for 3 decades. The Silver Medal, which she received for her Ph.D. dissertation in 1967, is the highest prize awarded by ETH Zurich.
