= Jan E. Leach =

American plant pathologist

- Born: Jan Elnor Leach; 1952 or 1953 (age 72–73)
- Education: Dordt University; University of Nebraska–Lincoln; University of Wisconsin–Madison
- Partner: Ned Tisserat
- Scientific career
- Institutions: East Malling Research Station; Kansas State University; International Rice Research Institute; Colorado State University

Jan Elnor Leach (born 1953) is an American plant pathologist. She is known for her research of the molecular biology of plant pathogens, particularly those affecting rice plants. She was the co-editor of the Annual Review of Phytopathology from 2015-2022 and is a fellow of the American Association for the Advancement of Science and a member of the National Academy of Sciences.

== Early life and education ==
Jan Elnor Leach was born in 1952 or 1953 in Lincoln, Nebraska to parents Jessamine and Lewis Leach. After attending Dordt University, a small college in Iowa, for two years, she transferred to the University of Nebraska–Lincoln, graduating in 1975 with a bachelor's degree in microbiology. She stayed at the University of Nebraska–Lincoln for her master's in microbiology, graduating in 1977. She attended the University of Wisconsin–Madison for her PhD in plant pathology, graduating in 1981.

== Career ==
After graduating with her PhD, she was a post-doctoral researcher from 1981 to 1984 at the East Malling Research Station in the United Kingdom. She then worked at Kansas State University as an assistant professor, becoming an associate professor in 1990 and a full professor in 1995. At KSU, she researched the bacteria Xanthomonas oryzae pv. oryzae, which is a bacterial blight of rice In 1997, she accepted a position at the International Rice Research Institute as a scientist and plant pathologist. She joined the faculty of Colorado State University in 2004 and she is a professor in the Department of Agricultural Biology in the Colorado State University College of Agricultural Sciences. She was made a University Distinguished Professor in 2007, and the Research Associate Dean of the College of Agricultural Sciences in 2015.

She has served as the editor of the journal Molecular Plant-Microbe Interactions; she has been the co-editor of the Annual Review of Phytopathology with Steven E. Lindow from 2015 to 2022.

== Awards and honors ==
In 1996, she was made a Distinguished Graduate Faculty Member at Kansas State; in 1998, she was named a University Distinguished Professor. She was elected as a fellow of the American Phytopathological Society in 1998, the American Academy of Microbiology in 2000, and the American Association for the Advancement of Science in 2002. She was the president of the International Society for Molecular Plant-Microbe Interactions from 1999 to 2001.

In 2019, she won the Agropolis Fondation Louis Malassis International Scientific Prize for Agriculture and Food in the "Distinguished Scientist" category.

In 2021, she was elected member of the U. S. National Academy of Sciences.

== Personal life ==
She is married to Ned Tisserat, also a plant pathologist.
