= Robert K. Webster =

American phytopathologist

- Born: 1938 (age 86–87); Solomonville, Arizona, United States
- Education: Utah State University; University of California, Davis
- Partner: Lexie Robison
- Scientific career
- Institutions: North Carolina State University; University of California, Davis

Robert Kent Webster (born 1938) is an American phytopathologist (plant disease researcher) who specialized in pathogens affecting rice during his career at the University of California, Davis. He was the editor of the Annual Review of Phytopathology from 1995–2003.

== Early life and education ==
Robert Kent Webster was born in 1938 in Solomonville, Arizona to parents Marie née Kindred and Elmo Reed Webster. He grew up on his family's farm in Rexburg, Idaho which grew potatoes and wheat. His mother also taught home economics at several local high schools. For his undergraduate, he attended Ricks College for one year before transferring to Utah State University where he graduated with a bachelor's in plant pathology. He then attended the University of California, Davis for his PhD.

== Career ==
Upon graduating with his PhD, he was offered a faculty position at UC Davis, though he turned it down because he had been told not to accept a job at the institution where one completed their graduate work. Instead, he accepted a position at North Carolina State University. He briefly worked there before returning to UC Davis. There, he researched the genetics of fungi that affected field crops; he developed a special interest in the pathogens of rice. He also researched barley pathogens. He served time as the chair of their Department of Plant Pathology, and was additionally the interim dean of the College of Agricultural and Environmental Sciences. He was the editor of the Annual Review of Phytopathology from 1995–2003. Webster retired from UC Davis in 2006, at which time he became a professor emeritus.

== Awards and honors ==
In 1999 he was awarded the California Rice Industry Award in recognition of his services to rice farms. He is an elected fellow of the American Phytopathological Society.

== Personal life and death ==
He and his wife Lexie née Robison met in high school; Lexie also attended Utah State University.
