= Zucchini yellow mosaic virus =

Virus classification
- (unranked): Virus
- Realm: Riboviria
- Kingdom: Orthornavirae
- Phylum: Pisuviricota
- Class: Stelpaviricetes
- Order: Patatavirales
- Family: Potyviridae
- Genus: Potyvirus
- Species: Potyvirus cucurbitaflavitesselati

Species of virus

Zucchini yellow mosaic virus (ZYMV) is an aphid-borne potyvirus, regarded as a major pathogen of cucurbits in most regions of the world where these crops are cultivated.

ZYMV affects all cucurbits including pumpkins, squashes, vegetable marrows, courgettes, melons, watermelons, cucumbers, gherkins and various gourds especially zucchinis. The effects are severe leaf mosaic, yellowing and eventually "shoestring" symptoms in the leaves. The fruits are stunted, twisted and deformed by raised protuberances, which reduces yield and makes them unmarketable in some cultures. In cultivated crops plants cease producing marketable fruits within 1–2 weeks of infection and serious financial losses can occur, particularly in courgette and marrow crops.

== Control ==
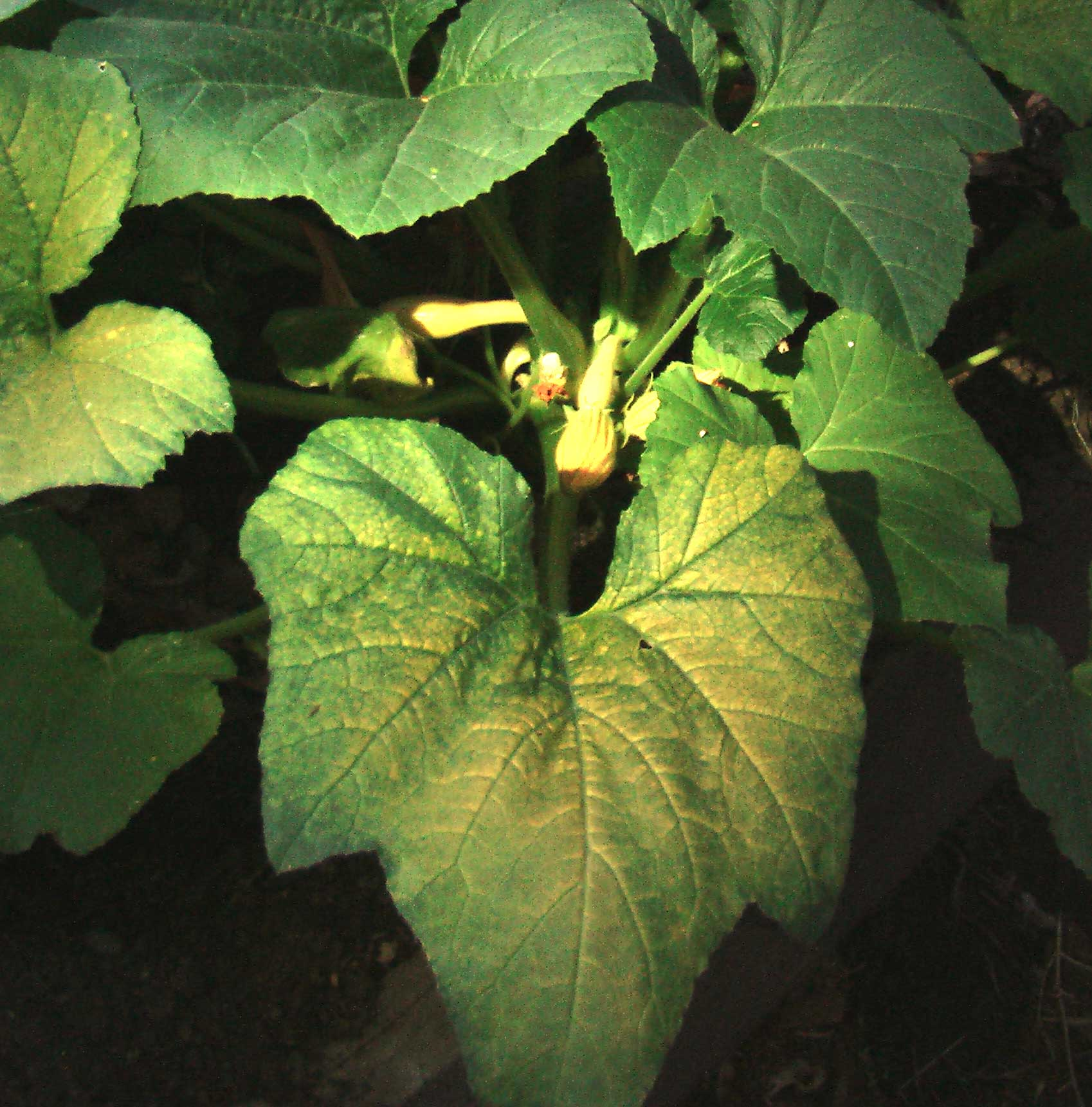
Yellow Mosaic Virus on yellow squash leaf

The disease may be introduced in infected seed, so sourcing clean seed can help prevent the disease. Control is largely dependent on using insecticides to control the aphid vectors. A form of "inoculation" or cross protection may also be used where seedlings are inoculated with a non-virulent strain of the virus (ZYMV-WK); this prevents infection with the severe strain.

A biotech yellow crookneck squash has been developed to resist Zucchini yellow mosaic virus (and Watermelon mosaic virus (WMV)). This contains the coat protein genes of the viruses. In 2009, relatively small amounts of this were grown commercially in the US.

It is similar to the Watermelon mosaic virus.
