= Phytobiome =

Community of plants (phyto) situated in their specific ecological areas (biome)

A phytobiome consists of a plant (phyto) situated in its specific ecological area (biome), including its environment and the associated communities of organisms which inhabit it. These organisms include all macro- and micro-organisms living in, on, or around the plant including bacteria, archaea, fungi, protists, insects, animals, and other plants. The environment includes the soil, air, and climate. Examples of ecological areas are fields, rangelands, forests. Knowledge of the interactions within a phytobiome can be used to create tools for agriculture, crop management, increased health, preservation, productivity, and sustainability of cropping and forest systems.

== Signaling ==
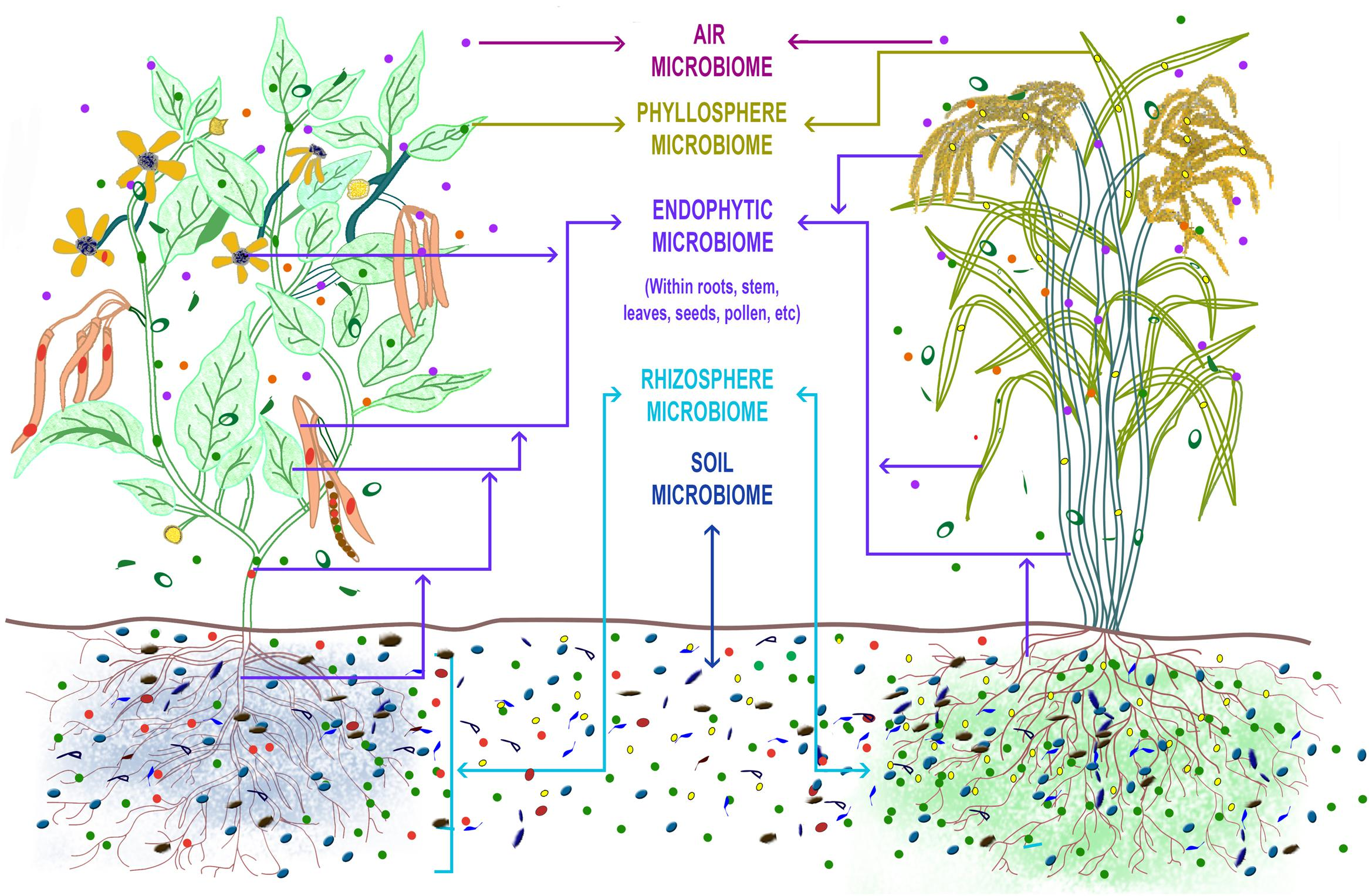
Environments within the Phytobiome

== Diversity ==
The microbial community within the phytobiome is one of the most diverse microbiomes on Earth. Plants form associations with billions of organisms. Recent metagenomic and metatranscriptomic approaches have helped scientists discover novel taxonomic species that are not easily cultured in a laboratory.

=== Bacteria ===
Recent research has shown that inter-kingdom communication between organisms is essential for proper phytobiome function. There are numerous physical and chemical signals such as secreted lipids, peptides and polysaccharides that allow organisms to recognize and interact within the phytobiome. Bacteria are known to produce quorum sensing molecules such as homoserine lactones, lipid-like diffusable factors and signaling peptides that mediate plant-bacteria interactions such as colonization. Homoserine lactones have been are reportedly produced by a large number of bacteria found in the rhizosphere. Plant growth promoting bacteria (PGPBs) often produce Nod factors (nodulation factors) that initiate nodule formation in plants. In addition to plant-bacterial interactions, bacteria often secrete bactericidal or fungicidal compounds into the phytobiome to reduce local competition for niches and resources. Additionally, organisms that feed on bacteria such as some species of algae and protists are attracted to these small signaling molecules.

=== Phages ===
Bacteriophages also play a critical role in the phytobiome through predator-prey interactions. Bacteriophages use a signaling peptides such as arbitrium to mediate the initiation of cell lysis and lysogeny in the host cell.

=== Fungi ===
Fungi communicate in the phytobiome through chemical signaling to aid in sexual reproduction, sporulation, cell-to-cell recognition and antibiosis; however, only a fraction of these chemicals have been studied for their function. Mycorrhizal fungi establish symbiotic relationships with plants through the production of Myc factors, or chitooligosaccharides that are recognized by receptors in the plant. Nematode-trapping fungi often utilize fungal signaling molecules to initiate morphogenesis towards prey. Other organisms can interfere with fungal signaling, such as plant-produced oxylipins that mimic fungal signaling molecules and can regulate fungal development or reduce virulence. Multiple species of bacteria, insects and nematodes have all been reported to respond to fungal signaling compounds.

=== Nematodes ===
Very little is known about nematode communication within the phytobiome. Plant-pathogenic nematodes often communicate through production of pheromones. Plants can detect these compounds and induce defense pathways. Nematodes also produce plant hormones such as cytokinins that aid in the establishment of association with plants.

=== Protists ===
Perhaps even less is known about the ecological role of protists and viruses within the phytobiome. Some amoebae species use cyclic nucleotides or peptide signals to adapt social behavior. Phytohormones produced by algae-associated bacteria can greatly impact microalgae populations in the soil. The presence of amoeba can also trigger the bacterium P. fluorescens to produce anti-amoebal toxins.

=== Insects ===
Insects communicate to transfer information regarding external threats, social status, food availability and mating through the production of volatile pheromones, also known as semiochemicals. This has made pheromones a subject of research since the 1950s for various applications in agriculture and insect-vectored diseases such as malaria. Plants can have profound impacts on insect pheromone production. Rattlebox plants produce various alkaloid compounds that insects use as a precursor for sex pheromone synthesis. Many plant species have evolved production of volatile chemicals that interfere with pheromone signaling, often through inhibition of proper olfactory neuron function. Bacteria and fungi can also produce volatile chemicals that affect insect behavior.

=== Plants ===
The presence of plants and their communication with other community members fundamentally shapes the phytobiome. Root exudates contain numerous sugars, amino acids, polysaccharides and secondary metabolites. The production of these exudates is heavily influenced by environmental factors and plant physiology and can alter the community composition of the rhizosphere and rhizoplane. The secretion of flavonoids helps to recruit Rhizobia bacteria that form a mutualistic symbiosis with numerous plant species. Rhizobia can also recognize other plant compounds such as betaines, aldonic acids and jasmonic acid. These signal molecules can have multiple or even counteracting effects. For example, plant cutins trigger arbuscular mycorrhizal colonization and symbiosis but can also be recognized by plant-pathogenic oomycetes and trigger pathogenesis. Plant volatile chemicals also attract herbivores, pollinators and seed carriers.

When plants recognize the presence of microbes, they often activate the production of phytohormone signals that are transported throughout the plant. Plants respond to pathogens and herbivores through production of hormones including salicylic acid, jasmonic acid and ethylene. In addition, many phytohormones that function in abiotic stress tolerance or plant growth also trigger responses with the microbial community. The production of salicylic acid in Arabidopsis was shown to influence the root microbiome composition by acting as a signal or carbon source. Secretion of strigolactone is known to stimulate spore germination and Myc factor production in arbuscular mycorrhizal fungi.

The microbial community can also manipulate phytohormone function or the production of specific phytohormones in plants.

== Research ==
In 2015 the American Phytopathological Society (APS) launched a research framework, the Phytobiomes Initiative, to facilitate the organization of research into phytobiomes. As part of this effort, in 2016 it launched Phytobiomes Journal, an open-access journal. The journal focuses on transdisciplinary research that impacts the entire plant ecosystem. An overall research strategy has been published in the Phytobiomes Roadmap, a document developed by a group of scientific societies, companies, research institutes, and governmental agencies. It is intended to present a strategic plan to study phytobiomes and propose an action plan to apply phytobiome studies. The connected Phytobiomes Alliance is an international, nonprofit consortium of academic institutions, large and small companies, and governmental agencies coordinating public-private research projects on various aspects of agriculturally relevant phytobiomes.

== See also ==
- Plant microbiome
- Soil biology
