= Dan Nettleton =

American biostatistician

Daniel S. Nettleton is an American statistical genomicist.

Nettleton was raised in Algona, Iowa. Both of his parents were high school teachers. Nettleton attended Wartburg College, where he played basketball, and earned his master's degree (1993) and doctorate (1996) in statistics at the University of Iowa. Nettleton began his teaching career at the University of Nebraska–Lincoln, then was recruited to join Iowa State University's faculty in 2000 by Dean Isaacson, who had earlier tried to convince Nettleton to pursue graduate studies at Iowa State. At ISU, Nettleton holds the Laurence H. Baker Endowed Chair in Biological Statistics, and was appointed to a distinguished professorship in 2015. The following year, Nettleton was appointed director of the Laurence H. Baker Center for Bioinformatics and Biological Statistics. In 2019, Nettleton succeeded Max Morris as chair of the Department of Statistics, and accepted a second term in the role in 2024. Nettleton stepped down as chair in June 2026, was replaced by Zhengyuan Zhu on an interim basis, and became associate dean for finance and operations the following month.

Nettleton was elected a fellow of the American Statistical Association in 2008, and began serving as chair-elect of the ASA's Caucus of Academic Representatives in 2022. In 2024, Nettleton was elected a fellow of the American Association for the Advancement of Science.
