= Steven E. Lindow =

American plant pathologist

- Born: 1951 (age 74–75); Portland, Oregon, United States
- Education: Oregon State University; University of Wisconsin
- Scientific career
- Institutions: University of California, Berkeley

Steven Earl Lindow (born 1951) is an American plant pathologist. He has researched the application of transgenic bacteria to prevent frost damage in crops as well as using bacteria to prevent russeting of fruit. He is a member of several scientific societies, including the National Academy of Sciences, and has been co-editor of the Annual Review of Phytopathology from 2015-2023.

== Early life and education ==
Steven Earl Lindow was born in 1951 in Portland, Oregon. His father had a farm where he grew wheat and clover seed. As a thirteen-year-old, he planted four acres of strawberries and boysenberries on the farm, but the crops died from frost damage. This would later influence his decision to research frost damage in crops, leading to the creation of ice-minus bacteria. He attended Oregon State University for his bachelor's degree and the University of Wisconsin for his PhD, graduating in 1977. His PhD research was on the plant pathogen Pseudomonas syringae, a species of bacteria that produces proteins that raise the temperature at which plants experience frost damage.

== Career ==
In 1978 he began working at the University of California, Berkeley as an assistant professor; he was promoted to associate professor in 1983. At Berkeley, he continued his work on the bacteria P. syringae; he and his colleagues created a transgenic form of the bacteria that lacked the gene to produce the protein that initiated ice formation at higher temperatures. The commercial strain was called "Frostban"; its initial testing in 1987 marked the first authorized outdoor testing of genetically engineered bacteria. Along with Deane Arny, Lindow holds several patents related to biocontrol agents to reduce frost damage in plants.

Lindow's research also explored the mechanism by which bacteria becomes resistant to copper, which is used as an antimicrobial. He also researched russeting in fruit, discovering that it is caused by the secretion of indole acetic acid by bacteria, and could be mitigated by spraying flowering plants with bacteria that competitively excludes the bacteria that causes russeting. From 2015-2023, he has been a co-editor of the Annual Review of Phytopathology, for most of that time with Jan E. Leach.

== Awards and honors ==
In 1985, he was awarded the William O. Baker Award for Initiatives in Research for his work on ice-minus bacteria. He was elected as a member of the National Academy of Sciences in 1999. He is also a fellow of the American Academy of Microbiology, American Phytopathological Society, and the American Association for the Advancement of Science.
