= John Charles Walker =

American agricultural scientist

John Charles Walker (July 6, 1893 – November 25, 1994) was an American agricultural scientist noted for his research of plant disease resistance. The New York Times said that Walker's "pioneering research in disease resistance in plants had a strong impact on world agriculture" and that Walker "was the first scientist to demonstrate the chemical nature of disease resistance in plants". Walker is most known for developing disease-resistant varieties of onions, cabbages, beans, peas, beets and cucumbers. The National Academy of Sciences said that he was considered "one of the world's greatest plant pathologists" and that "his fundamental discoveries of plant disease resistance made a lasting impact on world agriculture". Walker was professor emeritus at the University of Wisconsin–Madison. He was also president and a fellow of The American Phytopathological Society and received the APS Award of Distinction.

== Distinctions ==
- 1945: elected to the National Academy of Sciences
- 1960: an honorary doctor of science, University of Göttingen in Germany
- 1963: the Merit Award, the Botanical Society of America
- 1965: a fellow, the American Phytopathological Society
- 1970: Award of Distinction, the American Phytopathological Society
- 1972: E. C. Stakeman Award, The University of Minnesota
- 1978: the $50,000 Wolf Foundation Prize in Agriculture in Israel

== Chronology ==
- July 6, 1893: born in Racine, Wisconsin
- 1914: B.S., the University of Wisconsin–Madison
- 1915: M.S., the University of Wisconsin–Madison
- 1918: Ph.D., the University of Wisconsin–Madison
- November 25, 1994: died Boswell Memorial Hospital in Sun City, Arizona
