= Kenneth F. Baker =

American phytopathologist (1908–1996)

- Born: June 3, 1908; Ashton, South Dakota
- Died: April 16, 1996 (aged 87); Albany, Oregon
- Citizenship: US
- Education: Washington State University
- Partner(s): Dorothy Blackman (m. 1936) Katharine Cummings (m. 1944; died 1992) Kathryn Brock Hoffman (m. 1992–1996)
- Scientific career
- Institutions: United States Forest Service; United States Department of Agriculture; Pineapple Producers Cooperative Association; University of California, Los Angeles; University of California, Berkeley
- Thesis: Investigations on the Etiology and Control of the Blue-Mold-Decay of Apples Caused by Penicillium expansum Link (1934)
- Doctoral advisor: Frederick D. Heald

Kenneth Frank Baker (June 3, 1908–April 16, 1996) was an American phytopathologist (plant disease researcher). In his early career he held a number of positions with the United States Forest Service and United States Department of Agriculture. Following a three-year period in Hawaii researching pineapple pathogens, he accepted a position at the University of California, Los Angeles, where he remained for twenty-one years. He was elected as a fellow of the American Association for the Advancement of Science in 1950 and as a fellow of the American Phytopathological Society in 1969. Additionally, he served as the editor of the Annual Review of Phytopathology for five years.

== Early life and education ==
Kenneth Frank Baker was born in Ashton, South Dakota, on June 3, 1908, to parents May née Boyer and Frank Baker. While he was young, his family moved from Ashton to Clarkston, Washington. He had one brother, G. Orien Baker, who also later earned a PhD related to botany. He attended Washington State University, graduating in 1930 with his bachelor's degree and 1934 with his PhD.

== Career ==
He spent the summer before beginning college and two summer breaks during his undergraduate working for the United States Forest Service (USFS). He worked at the Selway National Forest at Kooskia, Idaho, doing trail maintenance, fire reporting, and construction of a fire lookout tower. He also documented the plants growing on the western slopes of the Bitterroot Range. The summer before his senior year, he worked in Elma, Washington, at a plant nursery and greenhouse. At this time, it is likely he developed his interest in diseases affecting ornamental plants. While a PhD student, he spent his summers as a laboratory assistant at the university and then with the USFS at Clearwater National Forest controlling for the rust fungus. After finishing his PhD, his first job was at the USDA Bureau of Plant Industry where he searched for evidence of Cenangium fungal infections in ponderosa pines. He then completed a post-doctoral research appointment at the University of Wisconsin with Benjamin Minge Duggar. His next position saw his return to the USDA Bureau of Plant Industry where he worked to address diseases affecting windbreak trees in Nebraska, specifically root diseases and soilborne pathogens, including damping off. From 1936–1939, he worked in Hawaii with the Pineapple Producers Cooperative Association. He researched various pathogens that affected pineapple cultivation, including root rot caused by the fungi Pythium and Phytophthora and heart rot. He then worked at the University of California, Los Angeles from 1940 to 1961, transferring to University of California, Berkeley in 1961. Baker retired from UC Berkeley in 1975; he moved to Oregon to be a courtesy professor emeritus at Oregon State University and a collaborator for the USDA Agricultural Research Service. He was president of the Council for Agricultural Science and Technology for 1979–1980.

The American Phytopathological Society noted that his 1957 publication The U.C. System for Producing Healthy Container-Grown Plants "revolutionized the nursery industry". Baker was part of the editorial board of the Annual Review of Phytopathology from its inception in 1963. He later served as its editor from 1972 to 1977.

== Awards and honors ==
Baker was elected to numerous scientific societies, including as a fellow of the American Association for the Advancement of Science in 1950 and as a fellow of the American Phytopathological Society in 1969. Additionally, he was named to the Horticultural Hall of Fame in 1976.

== Personal life and death ==
While getting his bachelor's degree, he was co-captain of the debate team and traveled widely for competitions. He was first married to Dorothy Velma née Blackman in 1936. His second marriage was to Katharine Cummings from 1944 until her death in 1992. He was married to Kathryn Brock Hoffman Baker from 1992 until his death in 1996. He died on April 16, 1996, in Albany, Oregon, at the age of 87.
