= Annual Review of Phytopathology =

- Discipline: Phytopathology
- Language: English
- Edited by: Gwyn A. Beattie and Sophien Kamoun

Publication details
- History: 1963–present, 63 years old
- Publisher: Annual Reviews (US)
- Frequency: Annually
- Open access: Subscribe to Open
- Impact factor: 13.2 (2025)

Standard abbreviations
- ISO 4: Annu. Rev. Phytopathol.

Indexing
- CODEN: APPYAG
- ISSN: 0066-4286 (print); 1545-2107 (web)

Links
- Journal homepage

The Annual Review of Phytopathology is a peer-reviewed academic journal that publishes review articles about phytopathology, the study of diseases that affect plants. It was first published in 1963 as the result of a collaboration between the American Phytopathological Society and the nonprofit publisher Annual Reviews (AR). As of 2026, Journal Citation Reports lists the journal's 2025 impact factor as 13.2, ranking it seventh of 285 journal titles in the category "Plant Sciences". As of 2023, it is being published as open access, under the Subscribe to Open model. Its current editors are Gwyn A. Beattie and Sophien Kamoun.

== History ==
Annual Reviews (AR) is a nonprofit organization whose stated mission is to synthesize knowledge "for the progress of science and the benefit of society." In the 1950s, the American Phytopathological Society (APS) intended to publish its own journal to cover significant developments in the field of phytopathology, or plant diseases. AR offered to publish the journal for them, and the APS agreed due to their publishing experience. In 1961, the American Phytopathological Society assembled the editorial board of the journal at their annual meeting. The first volume was published in 1963. It was the twelfth journal title published by AR. In its first ten volumes, AR published a total of 188 reviews from authors from twenty-one countries.

It defines its scope as covering significant developments related to plant pathology, including diagnosis, plant pathogens, host–pathogen interactions, epidemiology of plant disease, breeding plants for disease resistance, and plant disease management. It is abstracted and indexed in Scopus, Science Citation Index Expanded, Civil Engineering Abstracts, Inspec, and Academic Search, among others.

== Editorial processes ==
The Annual Review of Phytopathology is helmed by the editor or the co-editors. The editor is assisted by the editorial committee, which includes associate editors, regular members, and occasionally guest editors. Guest members participate at the invitation of the editor, and serve terms of one year. All other members of the editorial committee are appointed by the AR board of directors and serve five-year terms. The editorial committee determines which topics should be included in each volume and solicits reviews from qualified authors. Unsolicited manuscripts are not accepted. Peer review of accepted manuscripts is undertaken by the editorial committee.

=== Editors of volumes ===
Dates indicate publication years in which someone was credited as a lead editor or co-editor of a journal volume. The planning process for a volume begins well before the volume appears, so appointment to the position of lead editor generally occurred prior to the first year shown here. An editor who has retired or died may be credited as a lead editor of a volume that they helped to plan, even if it is published after their retirement or death.

- James G. Horsfall (1963–1971)
- Kenneth F. Baker (1972–1977)
- Raymond G. Grogan (1978–1984)
- R. James Cook (1985–1994)
- Robert K. Webster (1995–2003)
- Neal K. Van Alfen (2004–2016)
- Jan E. Leach (2017-2022) and Steven E. Lindow (2017–2022)
- John M. McDowell and Gwyn A. Beattie (2023–2025)
- Gwyn A. Beattie and Sophien Kamoun (2025–present)

== See also ==
- List of botany journals
