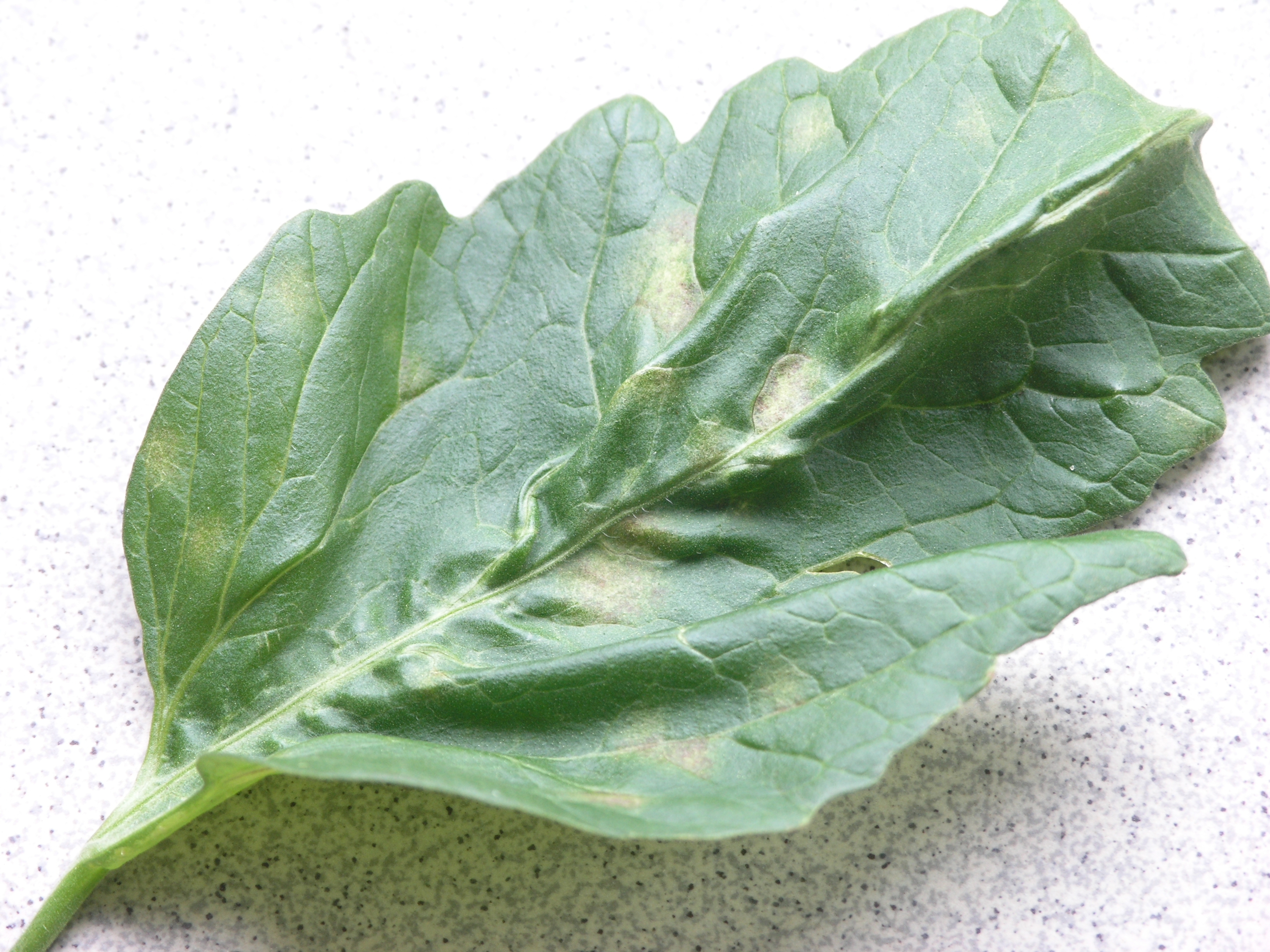
- Topside of tomato leaf infected by Passalora fulva
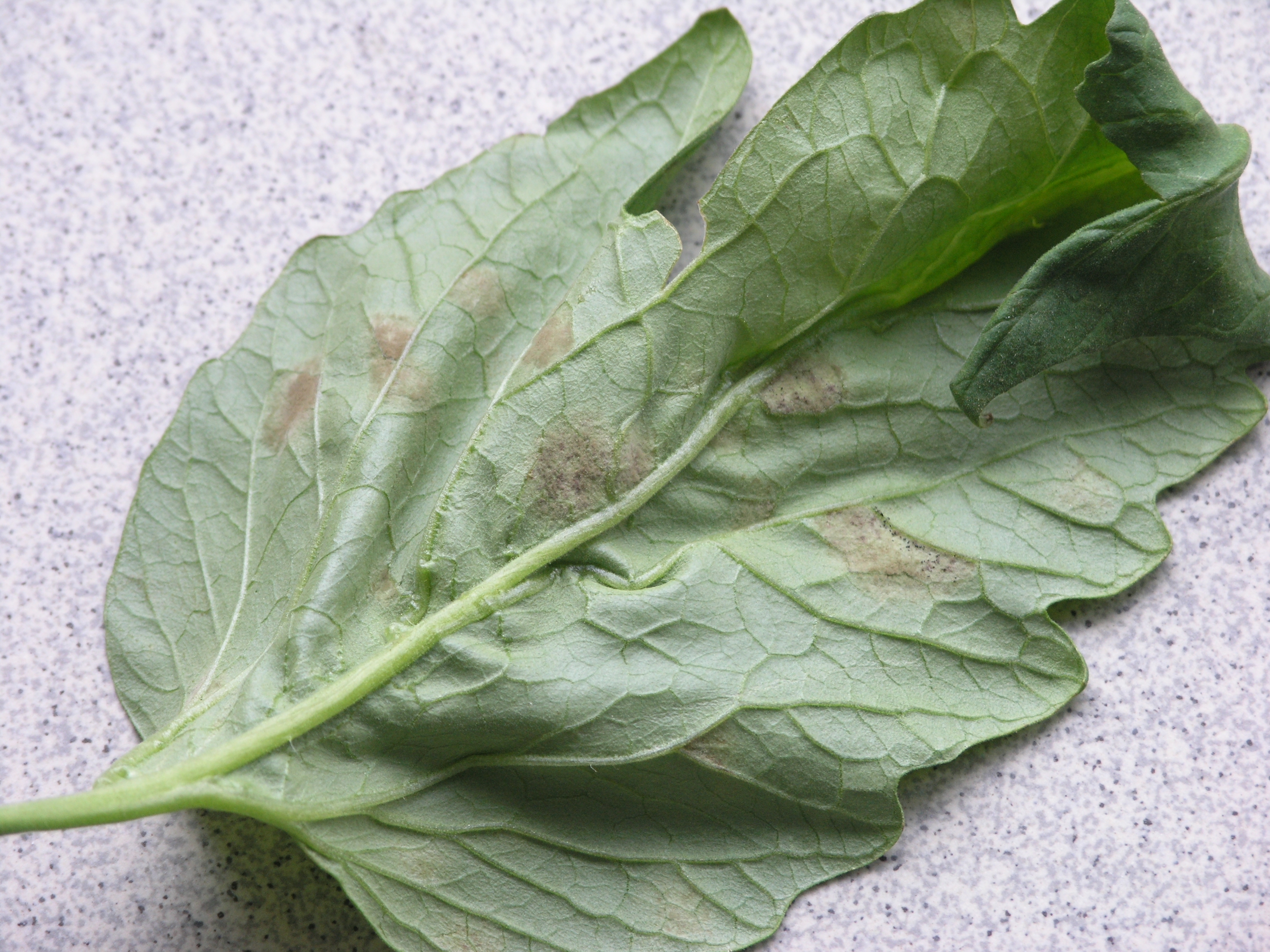
- Underside of tomato leaf infected by Passalora fulva

Scientific classification
- Kingdom: Fungi
- Division: Ascomycota
- Class: Dothideomycetes
- Order: Mycosphaerellales
- Family: Mycosphaerellaceae
- Genus: Passalora
- Species: P. fulva

Binomial name
- Passalora fulva (Cooke) U.Braun & Crous, (2003)

Synonyms
- Cladosporium fulvum Cooke, (1878); Fulvia fulva (Cooke) Cif., (1954); Mycovellosiella fulva (Cooke) Arx, (1983)

= Passalora fulva =

Species of fungus

Fulvia fulva (syn.: Passalora fulva, Mycovellosiella fulva, Cladosporium fulvum) is a fungal plant pathogen that causes tomato leaf mold.
