= Dean Isaacson =

American statistician (born 1941)

Dean Leroy Isaacson (born 1941) is an American statistician.

== Academic career ==
After graduating from Milaca High School in Milaca, Minnesota, Isaacson earned a bachelor's degree in mathematics at Macalester College, then completed his master's and doctorate at University of Minnesota. He joined the Iowa State University faculty in 1968, and served as chair of the Department of Statistics from 1984 to 2002, when he was succeeded in the role by Kenneth Koehler. Isaacson was granted emeritus status upon retirement in 2009.

== Honors ==
Isaacson is a 1994 fellow of the American Statistical Association. In 2013, he was elected to the Milaca High School Hall of Fame.

== Selected books ==
- Isaacson, Dean L.; Madsen, Richard W. (1976). Markov Chains: Theory and Applications. Wiley. ISBN 9780471428626.
