= Tomato leaf mold =

Scientific classification
- Kingdom: Fungi
- Division: Ascomycota
- Class: Dothideomycetes
- Order: Capnodiales
- Family: Mycosphaerellaceae
- Genus: Mycovellosiella
- Species: M. fulva

Binomial name
- Mycovellosiella fulva (Pers.) (1816) Link (1816)

Fungal plant pathogen

Cladosporium fulvum is an Ascomycete called Passalora fulva, a non-obligate pathogen that causes the disease on tomatoes known as the tomato leaf mold. P. fulva only attacks tomato plants, especially the foliage, and it is a common disease in greenhouses, but can also occur in the field. The pathogen is likely to grow in humid and cool conditions. In greenhouses, this disease causes big problems during the fall, in the early winter and spring, due to the high relative humidity of air and the temperature, that are propitious for the leaf mold development. This disease was first described in the North Carolina, by Mordecai Cubitt Cooke (1883), on cultivated tomato (Cooke 1883), although it is originally from South and Central America. The causal fungus of tomato leaf mold may also be referred to as Cladosporium fulvum (Cooke 1883), a former name.

== Hosts and symptoms ==
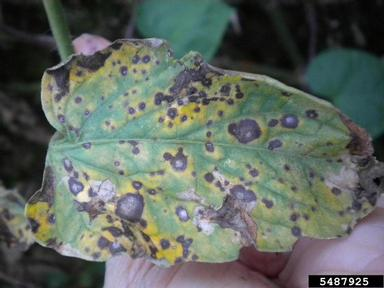
Symptoms on Tomato Leaf. Photograph provided by Elizabeth Bush, Virginia Polytechnic Institute and State University.

The tomato leaf mold fungus is a specific pathogen that only infects tomatoes, mainly in greenhouses.

The symptoms of this disease commonly occurs on foliage, and it develops on both sides of the leaf on the adaxial and abaxial surface. The older leaves are infected first and then the disease moves up towards young leaves.

Symptoms of tomato leaf mold appear usually with foliage, but fruit infection is rare. The primary symptom appear on the upper surface of infected leaves as a small spot pale green or yellowish with indefinite margins, and on corresponding area of the lower surface, the fungus begins to sporulate. The diagnostic symptom develops on lower surface as an olive green to grayish purple and velvety appearance, which are composed of spores (conidia). Continuously, the color of the infected leaf changes to yellowish brown and the leaf begins to curl and dry. The leaves will drop upon reaching a premature stage, and the defoliation of the infected host will cause further infection. This disease develops well in relative humidity levels above 85%. When the temperature reaches optimum level for germinating, the host will be infected by the pathogen. Occasionally, this pathogen causes disease on the fruit or blossoms with various symptoms. Fruits such as green and ripe one will develop dark rot on the stem. The blossoms will be killed before fruits grow.

== Environment ==
Free water is required for Cladosporium fulvum to germinate, spores are unable to infect the perfectly dried leaf. Spores germinate in the leaf surface with free water and humidity with above 85%. This pathogen can survive at least one year without a host which is called non-obligate. The temperature must be between 40°~94 °F (4°~34 °C) for germinating spore. The pathogen usually infects the leaves by penetrating through stomata in a high humidity level.

== Disease cycle ==
The life cycle starts with the fungus overwintering as sclerotia on plants debris, in seeds and in soils as a saprophyte. Conidia also play an important role as a survival structure, once they are resistant to drying, and might survive up to one year in the absence of a susceptible host. When condition are favorable the sclerotia produce new conidia, which act as primary inoculum to infect plants. The conidia produce mycelium that infects the plant through stomata when humidity is 85% or higher and produce conidiophores on the abaxial leaf surface of infected leaves. The symptoms usually start to appear 10 days after inoculation with spore formation, a large number of conidia are produced and these spores are easily spread from plant to plant by the wind, splash water, on tools, clothing of workers and also by insects. Spores are highly dependent on weather condition to germinate, thus they only geminate in water films or when the humidity level are superior than 85%, at temperature among 40° and 94 °F (4° and 34 °C). However the optimum temperature for germination is among 75° and 78 °F (24° and 26 °C).

== Reproduction ==
Although it was previously considered that C. fulvum only reproduces asexually, the discovery of mating type genes indicated a capability for sexual reproduction. These mating type genes have high similarity to homologous genes in other ascomycete fungi.

== Management ==
The disease management or control can be divided into two main groups: disease control in greenhouse and disease control in the field. Both controls are very similar. The differences are presented in few controls adopted in greenhouse in which some environmental conditions are controlled such as humidity and temperature as well sanitization of the greenhouse.

=== Culture ===
The first strategy of management is the cultural practices for reducing the disease. It includes adequating row and plant spacing that promote better air circulation through the canopy reducing the humidity; preventing excessive nitrogen on fertilization since nitrogen out of balance enhances foliage disease development; keeping the relatively humidity below 85% (suitable on greenhouse), promote air circulation inside the greenhouse, early planting might to reduce the disease severity and seed treatment with hot water (25 minutes at 122 °F or 50 °C).

=== Sanitation ===
The second strategy of management is the sanitization control in order to reduce the primary inoculum. Remove and destroy (burn) all plants debris after the harvest, scout for disease and rogue infected plants as soon as detected and steam sanitization the greenhouse between crops.

=== Resistance ===
The most effective and widespread method of disease control is to use resistant cultivars. However, only few resistant cultivar to tomato leaf mold are known such as Caruso, Capello, Cobra (race 5), Jumbo and Dombito (races 1 and 2). Moreover, this disease is not considered an important disease for breeding field tomatoes.

=== Chemical control ===
The least but not the less important management is the chemical control that ensure good control of the disease. The chemical control is basically spraying fungicide as soon as the symptoms are evident. Compounds registered for using are: chlorothalonil, maneb, mancozeb and copper.

== Importance ==
Tomato leaf mold is a plant disease originated from the South and Central America. In 1883, Cooke first discovered the tomato leaf mold in North Carolina. This disease is not common on the fruit, but if the control is not run, the foliage can be greatly damaged and result in significant yield losses.

Once the spores of this fungi are spread by air, water, tools and insects, the development of the disease is quick, moving from lower to upper leaves; the controlling must be done as soon as possible. It includes avoiding water on the surface of leaves, handling plants in high humidity, and in the worst case, disinfecting the whole greenhouse.
