= F. A. Murphy =

American virologist

Frederick A. Murphy was an American virologist. He was a member of the team of scientists that discovered the Ebola virus at the Centers for Disease Control and Prevention (CDC), where he served as Chief of Viropathology, near Emory University in Atlanta, Georgia, in 1976, and is internationally known for his work on rabies, encephalitis and hemorrhagic fevers, with over 250 peer-reviewed journal articles. Murphy was as an electron microscopy pioneer in the field of virology, best recognized for obtaining the first electron micrograph of an Ebola viral particle at the CDC in 1976.

Murphy earned a BS and a DVM from Cornell University and a PhD from the University of California, Davis. He served as chief, Viral Pathology Branch, then director of the Division of Viral and Rickettsial Diseases, and later director of the National Center for Infectious Diseases, Centers for Disease Control, in Atlanta, Georgia. He then served as dean of the School of Veterinary Medicine at University of California, Davis, and was later the James W. McLaughlin Professor in Residence, Department of Pathology, at the University of Texas Medical Branch (UTMB) in Galveston, Texas, as well as a senior scientist at the Galveston National Laboratory. After retiring in 2015, he was named a professor emeritus of pathology at UTMB.He was of Irish descent.

In recent years, he served as a member of the United States Department of Health and Human Services Secretary’s Council on Public Health Preparedness. He was also a member of the Institute of Medicine (National Academy of Medicine) Committee on Microbial Threats, co-chair of the National Research Council Committee on Occupational Health and Safety in the Care and Use of Nonhuman Primates, member of the National Academy of Sciences Committee on Public Health, Agriculture, Basic Research, Counterterrorism and Non-proliferation Activities in Russia, and member of the Institute of Medicine (National Academy of Medicine) Committee on Transmissible Spongiform Encephalopathies.

Murphy was an editor of the sixth edition of the International Committee on Taxonomy of Viruses's Virus Taxonomy (1995). His honors include elected membership in the National Academy of Medicine of the National Academies of Sciences, Engineering, and Medicine, the United States Presidential Rank Award, membership in the German Academy of Sciences at Berlin and the USSR Academy of Medical Sciences, the K.F. Meyer Gold Headed Cane, Doctor of Medicine and Surgery honoris causa, University of Turku, Finland, and Doctor of Science honoris causa, University of Guelph, Ontario, Canada. Murphy was also the 2009 recipient of the Penn Vet World Leadership Award.

Murphy died at age 92 on June 23rd, 2026.
