= Protein Expression and Purification (journal) =

- Discipline: Biotechnology
- Language: English
- Edited by: R.R. Burgess

Publication details
- History: 1990-present
- Publisher: Elsevier
- Frequency: Monthly
- Impact factor: 1.695 (2015)

Standard abbreviations
- ISO 4: Protein Expr. Purif.

Indexing
- ISSN: 1046-5928

Links
- Journal homepage; Online access

Protein Expression and Purification is a peer-reviewed scientific journal covering biotechnological research on protein production and isolation based on conventional fractionation as well as techniques employing various molecular biological procedures to increase protein expression.

== Abstracting and indexing ==
The journal is abstracted and indexed in Biological Abstracts, Chemical Abstracts, Current Contents/Life Sciences, EMBiology, Food Science and Technology Abstracts, MEDLINE, Science Citation Index and Scopus.

== See also ==
- Protein purification
