= Plant Disease (journal) =

Peer-reviewed scientific journal

- Discipline: Plant pathology
- Language: English
- Edited by: Kerik Cox

Publication details
- History: 1917–present
- Publisher: American Phytopathological Society
- Frequency: Monthly
- Open access: Delayed, 1 year
- Impact factor: 4.4 (2023)

Standard abbreviations
- ISO 4: Plant Dis.

Indexing
- CODEN: PLDIDE
- ISSN: 0191-2917
- LCCN: 79643690
- OCLC no.: 263603135

Links
- Journal homepage; Online access (post-1997); Online access (pre-1997)

Plant Disease is a peer-reviewed scientific journal of plant pathology focusing on new diseases, epidemics, and methods of disease control. It is a continuation of The Plant Disease Bulletin (1917–1922) and The Plant Disease Reporter (1923–1979), both publications of the US Department of Agriculture. It is currently published by the American Phytopathological Society and edited by Kerik Cox (Cornell University).

== Indexing and abstracting ==
According to the Journal Citation Reports, the journal has a 2023 impact factor of 4.4. The journal is indexed in the following bibliographic databases:

- Academic Search Premier
- AGRICOLA
- Biosis
- Food Science & Technology Abstracts
- PASCAL
- Science Citation Index
- Scopus
