= American Phytopathological Society =

American scientific learned society

- Website: http://www.apsnet.org

The American Phytopathological Society (APS) is an international scientific organization devoted to the study of plant diseases (phytopathology). APS promotes the advancement of modern concepts in the science of plant pathology and in plant health management in agricultural, urban and forest settings.

The Society has nearly 5,000 plant pathologists and scientists worldwide. It is the oldest and largest organization of its type in the world. It is also a member of the International Society for Plant Pathology.

APS provides information on the latest developments and research advances in plant health science through its journals and its publishing arm, APS Press.

APS advocates and participates in the exchange of plant health information with public policy makers and the larger scientific community, and it provides advice on education and training.

== History ==
The society was founded in December 1908 by a group led by Cornelius Lott Shear. The first regular meeting was held in December 1909. It was the first scientific organization in the world to be devoted exclusively to phytopathology.

In 1929, its Canadian Phytopathological division was spun off into an independent organization, the Canadian Phytopathological Society.

== Journals ==
The society began publishing scientific peer-reviewed research in 1911 and today publishes five journals in the area of plant pathology:

- Phytopathology ISSN 0031-949X
- Plant Disease ISSN 0191-2917
- Molecular Plant-Microbe Interactions ISSN 0894-0282
- Plant Health Progress ISSN 1535-1025
- Plant Health Instructor ISSN 1935-9411
- Phytobiomes Journal ISSN 2471-2906

== Awards ==
The society gives a number of awards, designated by the National Research Council (United States) as "prestigious."

- Ruth Allen Award has been given since 1966 to outstanding researchers in plant pathology. The award is named after Ruth F. Allen 1879–1963, a researcher in rust fungi and the first woman to receive a PhD in botany from the University of Wisconsin. It is distinct from the Ruth Allen Award established in 2005 by the Pipeline Industries Guild, named for an engineering professor at the University of Exeter.
- William Boright Hewitt and Maybelle Ellen Ball Hewitt Award is given within 5 years after a PhD for innovative research or activities on control of plant disease.
- Lee M. Hutchins Award is given for research on perennial fruit plants' diseases.
- Noel T. Keen Award is given for research on molecular plant pathology.
